= Dangerous Driving (video game) =

2019 video game

- Logo
- Developer: Three Fields Entertainment
- Publisher: Three Fields Entertainment
- Platforms: Microsoft Windows, PlayStation 4, Xbox One
- Release: 9 April 2019
- Genre: Racing
- Modes: Single-player, multiplayer

Dangerous Driving is a racing video game developed by Three Fields Entertainment, released on 9 April 2019 for Microsoft Windows, PlayStation 4, and Xbox One.

== Gameplay ==
Dangerous Driving is a racing game and is considered as a spiritual sequel to the Burnout series. Players, after selecting a car and track, attempt to beat the other racers (computer-controlled, or online players). Dangerous Driving includes the same crash elements from Burnout; players can ram opponents into the sides of the track or oncoming traffic to make them crash (known as Takedowns), temporarily stopping them from racing. By performing Takedowns or driving stunts like drifting, players can build up a Nitro meter. Once past a certain threshold, players can activate Nitro which gives them a speed boost.

== Development ==
Three Fields Entertainment was formed by Alex Ward, Fiona Sperry, and Paul Ross, prior members of Criterion Games. They were the original developers of the Burnout franchise, which was published by Electronic Arts (EA). Around 2011, EA assigned the Need for Speed series to Criterion, de-emphasizing the Burnout series, and then later in 2013 moved about 80% of Criterion's staff to Ghost Games to continue Need for Speed. This move left Ward and Sperry concerned about Criterion's state within EA, and decided to leave, along with Ross, to form Three Fields.

One of Three Fields' founding goals was to recreate a Burnout game on their own terms. Since they were a small team (up to seven during the development of Dangerous Driving compared to the 90 they had when Burnout 3: Takedown was shipping), lacking any assets they had from Criterion, they had to take a slower approach towards this goal. They instead planned on developing less ambitious games that were all aimed towards providing the internal support they needed to get to a Burnout game. These games included Dangerous Golf, which helped establish the destruction system essential to Burnout, Danger Zone, which added in driving elements within a closed environment, and its sequel Danger Zone 2, which added larger areas for driving around. These intermediate games were done on limited budgets and within a short time scale, meaning it lacked some elements that they knew they needed to address before Dangerous Driving was to be released. While these games were not blockbuster sellers, the revenues from each helped fund the development of the next game. The small size and limited resources also enhanced their efficiency in producing assets. Ward noted that back when they developed Burnout 2, it had taken 40 staff over two months to put together a single level, while with Dangerous Driving, their small team was able to complete a whole build within the same time.

Due to its development budget, Dangerous Driving does not include any in-game music, but instead integrates with Spotify to allow players to create their own playlists.

Dangerous Driving was released on 9 April 2019. The game shipped without online multiplayer, but this was added on 24 May.

== Reception ==
Reception

Aggregate score
Aggregator	Score
Metacritic	70/100 (PC); 62/100(PS4); 65/100 (XONE)

Review scores
Publication	Score
Destructoid	7.5/10
GameRevolution	7/10
GameSpot	5/10
IGN	7.2/10
Push Square	6/10

=== Accolades ===
Dangerous Driving won the award for "Game, Original Racing" at the NAVGTR Awards.

== Planned sequel ==
Three Fields announced Dangerous Driving 2 for a then-planned release of late 2021 for Microsoft Windows, PlayStation 4, Xbox One, and the Nintendo Switch. It is expected to be an open world format, similar in nature to Burnout Paradise. At Gamescom 2022, THQ Nordic announced Wreckreation, scheduled to be released in January 2024 for Microsoft Windows, PlayStation 5 and Xbox Series X and Series S, Wreckreation was released on October 28, 2025.
