= Lethal VR =

2016 virtual reality shooter video game

- Developer: Three Fields Entertainment
- Publisher: Team17
- Director: Alex Ward
- Designer: Chris Roberts
- Artist: Paul Phillpot
- Engine: Unreal Engine 4
- Platforms: Windows, PlayStation 4
- Release: Windows; 8 November 2016; PlayStation 4; 20 December 2016
- Genre: Shooting gallery
- Mode: Single-player

Lethal VR is a virtual reality shooting gallery video game developed by Three Fields Entertainment and published by Team17.

== Gameplay ==
Lethal VR is a virtual reality shooting gallery video game played from a first-person perspective. Players assume the role of FBI recruit who is being assessed in a target range.

== Development and release ==
Lethal VR was developed by UK-based video game studio Three Fields Entertainment. It is the second game from the studio following their debut title Dangerous Golf. Lethal VR was built in the Unreal Engine 4 game engine and specifically for the HTC Vive and PlayStation VR virtual reality headsets. The development team paused work on their upcoming game (Danger Zone) and began working on Lethal VR in mid 2016 after Epic Games sent them several Vive kits.

Lethal VR was published by Team17. The game was released for Windows on 8 November 2016 and PlayStation 4 on 20 December 2016.

== Reception ==
Reception

Aggregate score
Aggregator	Score
Metacritic	66/100 (PC); 56/100 (PS4)

Review scores
Publication	Score
Edge	6/10
GamesMaster	44/100
GamesTM	5/10
PlayStation Official Magazine – UK	5/10

Lethal VR received "mixed or average reviews" from professional critics according to review aggregator website Metacritic.
