= Burnout Legends =

2005 video game

- Developers: Criterion Games (PSP); Visual Impact (DS)
- Publisher: Electronic Arts
- Series: Burnout
- Engine: RenderWare
- Platforms: PlayStation Portable; Nintendo DS
- Release: PlayStation Portable: NA: 13 September 2005; EU: 16 September 2005; Nintendo DS: NA: 29 November 2005; EU: 9 December 2005
- Genre: Racing
- Modes: Single-player, multiplayer

Burnout Legends is a 2005 racing video game developed by Criterion Games and published by Electronic Arts for PlayStation Portable. The game features many of the tracks and gameplay modes from the first three Burnout titles but repackaged for the handheld format. Many of the gameplay modes are similar to Burnout 3: Takedown using a mixture of old and new tracks. The Nintendo DS port was developed by Visual Impact.

The PSP version of Legends received mostly positive reviews, while the DS version received negative reviews according to review aggregator Metacritic.

== Gameplay ==
An in-game screenshot of Burnout Legends on the Nintendo DS

In the game, players will compete in a series of racing modes to unlock returning tracks, cars and events. The following list includes the 9 main types of modes in the game:

- World Tour: Players compete against other cars in different varieties of modes. The tour is divided into car types. There are three medal types (Gold: 1st place, Silver: 2nd place, Bronze: 3rd Place) in a series to unlock Grand Prix. Finishing gold in the GP unlocks the next World Tour series. World Tour is the primary way to unlock cars.
- Race: Players race against up to four cars (World Tour default is 4) in a 3 lap race on any track.
- Eliminator: Only accessible in World Tour, it is the same as a Race, but on each lap, the lowest ranking car is eliminated. The race goes on until one winner is left.
- Face-Off: Players race against a legend car to win it.
- Time Attack: Racing mode against the clock. The goal is to complete a lap as fast as possible. The player can do as many laps as they like.
- Burning Lap: World Tour version of time attack. Players can complete a lap by the medal time (for example, finishing before gold medal time 1:00:00 to earn gold medal).
- Road Rage: Players can make other cars crash to earn Takedowns. In World Tour, the player has a limited amount of time. The event will be finished if they run out of time or "total" their car.
- Pursuit: Players become the cop to take out one or more racers before time runs out or the racer(s) get(s) away. The mode includes new boss challenge pursuit events. The final event is Total Pursuit. Getting Gold in Total Pursuit unlocks Legend Series.
- Crash: Players compete in crash events to unlock returning cars and crash junctions (featured in both World Tour and Single Player).

=== Vehicles ===
There are a total of 89 cars to unlock through the various classes – these are Compact, Muscle, Coupe, Sports, and Super. There is also the Race Special and Heavyweight classes. Some cars can also be unlocked by completing conditions. The cars featured in the game are from Burnout 2 and 3.

The game also has Collector's cars. There are five collector cars for each class, but the player only starts with just one random car for each class. To get the other four, the player has to challenge another player on a Wi-Fi battle mode, betting their collector car against theirs and win their car in the challenge (the Collector's cars are exclusive for the PSP version).

== Reception ==
Reception

Aggregate score
Aggregator	Score	
Aggregator	DS	PSP
Metacritic	38/100	86/100

Review scores
Publication	Score	
Publication	DS	PSP
Edge	N/A	7/10
Electronic Gaming Monthly	N/A	8.83/10
Eurogamer	N/A	9/10
Game Informer	N/A	8/10
GamePro	N/A	4.5/5
GameRevolution	N/A	B+
GameSpot	4/10	9/10
GameSpy	1/5	3.5/5
GameZone	N/A	9/10
IGN	3.5/10	8.5/10
Nintendo Life	5/10	N/A
Official U.S. PlayStation Magazine	N/A	4.5/5
The Times	N/A	5/5

Burnout: Legends received mostly positive reviews for the PSP version, while the DS version received negative reviews, according to video game review aggregator website Metacritic.

During the 9th Annual Interactive Achievement Awards, the Academy of Interactive Arts & Sciences nominated Burnout Legends for "Handheld Game of the Year", which was ultimately awarded to Nintendogs.
