= Need for Speed: Most Wanted (2012 video game) =

2012 open world racing video game

- Cover art featuring a Porsche 911 (991), a Dodge Charger and an Aston Martin V12 Vantage
- Developer: Criterion Games
- Publisher: Electronic Arts
- Producers: James Hans; Leanne Loombe; Neil Manners
- Designer: Matt Follett
- Composers: Chris Green; Vanesa Lorena Tate
- Series: Need for Speed
- Platforms: Microsoft Windows; PlayStation 3; PlayStation Vita; Xbox 360; iOS; Android; Kindle Fire; Wii U
- Release: Microsoft Windows, PlayStation 3, PS Vita, Xbox 360, iOS, Android, Kindle Fire: NA: 30 October 2012; AU: 1 November 2012; EU: 2 November 2012; Wii U: NA: 19 March 2013; AU: 21 March 2013; EU: 22 March 2013
- Genre: Racing
- Modes: Single-player; multiplayer

Need for Speed: Most Wanted (Note: Also known as Need for Speed: Most Wanted – A Criterion Game; often retroactively shortened to Most Wanted 2012) is a 2012 racing game developed by Criterion Games and published by Electronic Arts. Most Wanted is the nineteenth title in the Need for Speed series and was released worldwide for Microsoft Windows, PlayStation 3, Xbox 360, PlayStation Vita, iOS and Android, beginning in North America in 2012. A Wii U version, under the title Need for Speed: Most Wanted U, was released in 2013. Like its predecessor, 2010's Hot Pursuit, the game is a revival of the original 2005 Most Wanted title.

Need for Speed: Most Wanted received positive reviews, which focused on the world map that blended the styles of previous Burnout and Need for Speed games, and the social features, while criticism fell on the single-player mode. The game has won several awards, including the 2012 Spike Video Game Awards for Best Driving Game and Racing Game of the Year at the 16th Annual D.I.C.E. Awards; it was also nominated for Best British Game and Best Online Multiplayer at the 2013 BAFTA Awards. Need for Speed: Most Wanted has also been recognized as the best driving/racing game of 2012 by several outlets.

Most Wanted would be the last game in franchise to have Criterion as the lead studio until 2022's Need for Speed Unbound.

== Gameplay ==
The player's car being pursued by several police cars during a racing session. This pre-release screenshot also depicts the use of HDR rendering on the sunny sky and surface lighting.

Need for Speed: Most Wanted is set in an open world environment. The game takes on the gameplay style of the first Most Wanted title in the Need for Speed franchise; the contrast difference is the 2012 Most Wanted does not contain a story. Most Wanted allows players to select one car and compete against other racers in three types of events: Sprint races, which involves traveling from one point of the city to another, Circuit races, each having two or three laps total and Speed runs, which involve traversing through a course in the highest average speed possible. There are also Ambush races, where the player starts surrounded by cops and must evade their pursuit as quickly as possible.

Cops are integrated into certain racing sessions, in which the police deploy vehicles and tactics to stop the player's car and arrest the player, like the original Most Wanted. The game features a Most Wanted List of 10 racers, similar to the Blacklist in the single-player section of the original Most Wanted, which featured 15 racers. As the Most Wanted racers are defeated, their cars are added to the player's roster. In this reiteration, the focus shifts from Rockport, the city in the original, to a new city called Fairhaven.

Fairhaven resembles a regular city. It has a beach and an industrial district. It has a main highway dubbed I-92 that stretches across the city. The gameplay of Most Wanted has been likened to that of the Burnout series. Unlike the game's spiritual predecessor Burnout Paradise, the races have checkpoints that you must pass through instead of just having a start and end. Destructible billboards and fences; and drive-through repair garages, all of which originated from Paradise, are also featured.

The game uses Autolog, the competition-between-friends system developed by Criterion for Need for Speed: Hot Pursuit, and since used in other titles in the Need for Speed series. Autolog in Most Wanted plays a larger role and gives more information to players. Activities in-game allow players to earn Speed Points which can boost players up on the Most Wanted list. Autolog recommendations have now been integrated into the game world, rather than sit externally on the menu system. Most Wanted features a new social system called Cloudcompete, which strings together Most Wanted across all platforms in an inspired example of cross-compatibility. One profile is used for all versions of the game, allowing the player to rank up on one format and continue progress on another.

The driving model of the game has been described as "deep, physical and fun", not as arcade-styled as the Burnout series and Hot Pursuit, but far from a simulator. Most Wanted has a range of real-world vehicles, a mix of muscle cars, street racers and exotics, described as "the wildest selection of cars yet". The cars can be altered with performance upgrades, such as reinflatable tires, transmission, engine, nitrous oxide, and body work that enables players to crash through roadblocks, have a higher top speed, and accelerate faster. A feature called EasyDrive enables players to modify their vehicle performance while in usage. Almost all the cars are available from the start, hidden in different locations throughout Fairhaven; the player has to discover them in order to unlock them.

=== Wii U ===
The Wii U-exclusive cooperative "Co-Driver" mode in action. One player drives with the Wii Remote (pictured with the Wii Wheel) while the other provides assistance using the Wii U GamePad.

The Wii U version was retitled to Need for Speed: Most Wanted U. It includes content from the previously released Ultimate Speed Pack, and offers three unique features that take advantage of the Wii U GamePad to make it the "Enhanced Version."

This version supports Off-TV Play, which is the ability to play the game exclusively on the Wii U GamePad, independently from the television. There is also a new co-op mode, called Co-Driver, that supports two players: one player drives using a Wii Remote or the Wii U Pro Controller and another uses the Wii U GamePad to provide control and navigation assistance on an interactive real-time map. The Wii U GamePad can also be used to change mods and switch cars.

The Wii U version of the game also includes full Miiverse integration, which is the first for a third-party game on Wii U. The game also includes three secret vehicles which are exclusive to the Wii U version, all which allude to the Mario franchise characters Mario, Peach, and Yoshi. These secret vehicles can each be accessed via hidden entrances, shaped like the iconic Warp Pipes from the series, on various tracks. Finding all the secret vehicles unlocks secret license plates which further confirm the allusion of these characters. Besides the included Ultimate Speed Pack, there is no DLC for the Wii U version of the game.

== Development ==
In November 2011, it was revealed that Criterion Games was developing another Need for Speed game, according to a job advertisement. According to the job listing, the studio was "looking for talented Cinematic Artists to work on the world's number one, multi award winning, arcade racing franchise." According to the listing, players should expect "entertaining, compelling in-game cinematic action sequences" from the racer, as well as "intense car action sequences, terrifying jumps, insane crashes and epic car chases." Earlier in the year, another job advert revealed that Criterion was developing a game with "believable, open world AI racing drivers." On 11 January 2012, British retailer Game revealed that EA plans to release Medal of Honor: Warfighter and a new entry in the Need for Speed series later that year, which was shown by EA during a confidential presentation. However, the developer and what direction the racing series takes in 2012 was not revealed. On 23 January 2012, Criterion's creative director, Craig Sullivan, said on Twitter that the Guildford-based studio has "lots to share over the coming months". Sullivan did not provide any further details, except to say the upcoming announcement/s are "going to be BIG". On 8 April 2012, South African-based online retailer BTGames listed Dead Space 3 and Need for Speed: Most Wanted 2 for pre-order.

On 7 May 2012, EA confirmed that new entries in both the Dead Space and Need for Speed franchises would be on shelves by March 2013. The then unnamed and unannounced Need for Speed game was slated for a Q3 2012 release, which would have been any time between October and Christmas 2012. On 25 May 2012, a booth schedule sent out by Twitch revealed that EA was showing off Need for Speed: Most Wanted at E3. While EA had previously confirmed that a new Need for Speed was on the way, this was the first time its title had been confirmed. On 1 June 2012, EA officially confirmed the existence of the Criterion-developed Need for Speed: Most Wanted as part of the publisher's E3 line-up.

"We looked through the entire history of Need for Speed, and we came across the game. We really loved the premise of being the 'Most Wanted' amongst your friends, which is a really powerful idea. We really liked that. This game is all about being the Most Wanted among your friends."

— Hamish Young from Criterion Games

Need for Speed: Most Wanted was officially revealed at EA's Media Briefing during E3 2012, with a trailer which showed a police chase involving a street race. The trailer was followed by a live demo of the game on stage by creative director Craig Sullivan. When asked about that Criterion Games would only be focused on Need for Speed, meaning no more Burnout, Sullivan stated "It's more a case of wanting to get Need for Speed back on its feet after last year," referring to the poorly received Need for Speed: The Run. Producer Matt Webster stated that Most Wanted is "everything we know about open-world driving, just piling it together. All the best stuff about Burnout and everything we did in Hot Pursuit, we're just smashing them together."

On 30 July 2012, it was reported that Most Wanted would include some form of Kinect functionality on Xbox 360. The "Better with Kinect" banner was seen emblazoned on the game's Xbox 360 cover during the game latest gameplay trailer. On 7 September 2012, it was confirmed by producer Matt Webster that the game would support Kinect with a range of support-oriented voice commands that allow players to keep watching the road in front of them. Many of the commands would be tied to the game's "easy drive" menus.

At Gamescom 2012, Sony Computer Entertainment announced Cross Buy, which offers the Vita version of a game for free to customers who purchase it on PlayStation 3. When asked by IGN about Cross Buy for Most Wanted, an EA spokesperson told "We're taking it under consideration, but we have no specific plans to announce at this time." Producer Matt Webster announced that the Vita version of the game is "exactly the same game [as the PlayStation 3 version] apart from traffic density and number of players online," which it called a "significant achievement" on the portable.

The old game -- which I loved, it was the first game I ever played on 360 -- that was of the time, right? That was how games were, they were more offline than online. There was more single-player than say, multiplayer. So with this game, like I said, we’ve tried to shake that up. We’ve built multiplayer first; we have to do it very online. We didn't want to make a sequel to that, because we can't make a sequel to somebody else's game; it's incredibly hard.

— Alex Ward, Criterion Games' Vice President

== Soundtrack ==
As with previous Need for Speed titles, Most Wanted's soundtrack contains a variety of licensed music. It mainly comprises electronic music (including dubstep, such as Skrillex; techno, such as Deadmau5; and electronica, such as Zedd), alternative rock, and rap, such as "Bonkers" by Dizzee Rascal. Among these songs are two remixes of The Who songs originally from the album Who's Next. Most Wanted also contains songs from Criterion Games' previous title, Burnout Crash!, which play over the stereo of parked cars. The menu music was composed by Vanesa Lorena Tate.

== Marketing and release ==
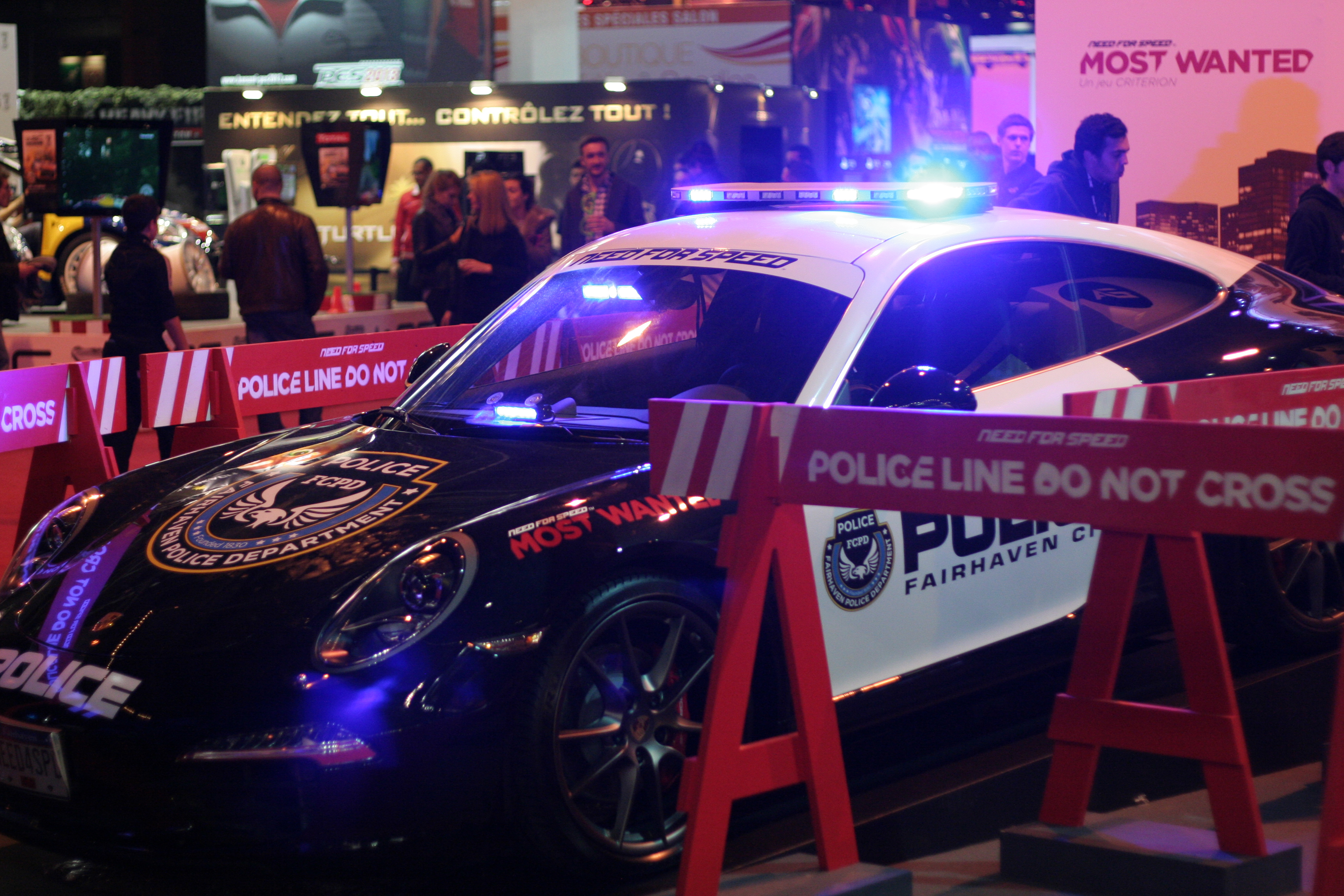
Promotion at Paris Games Week 2012

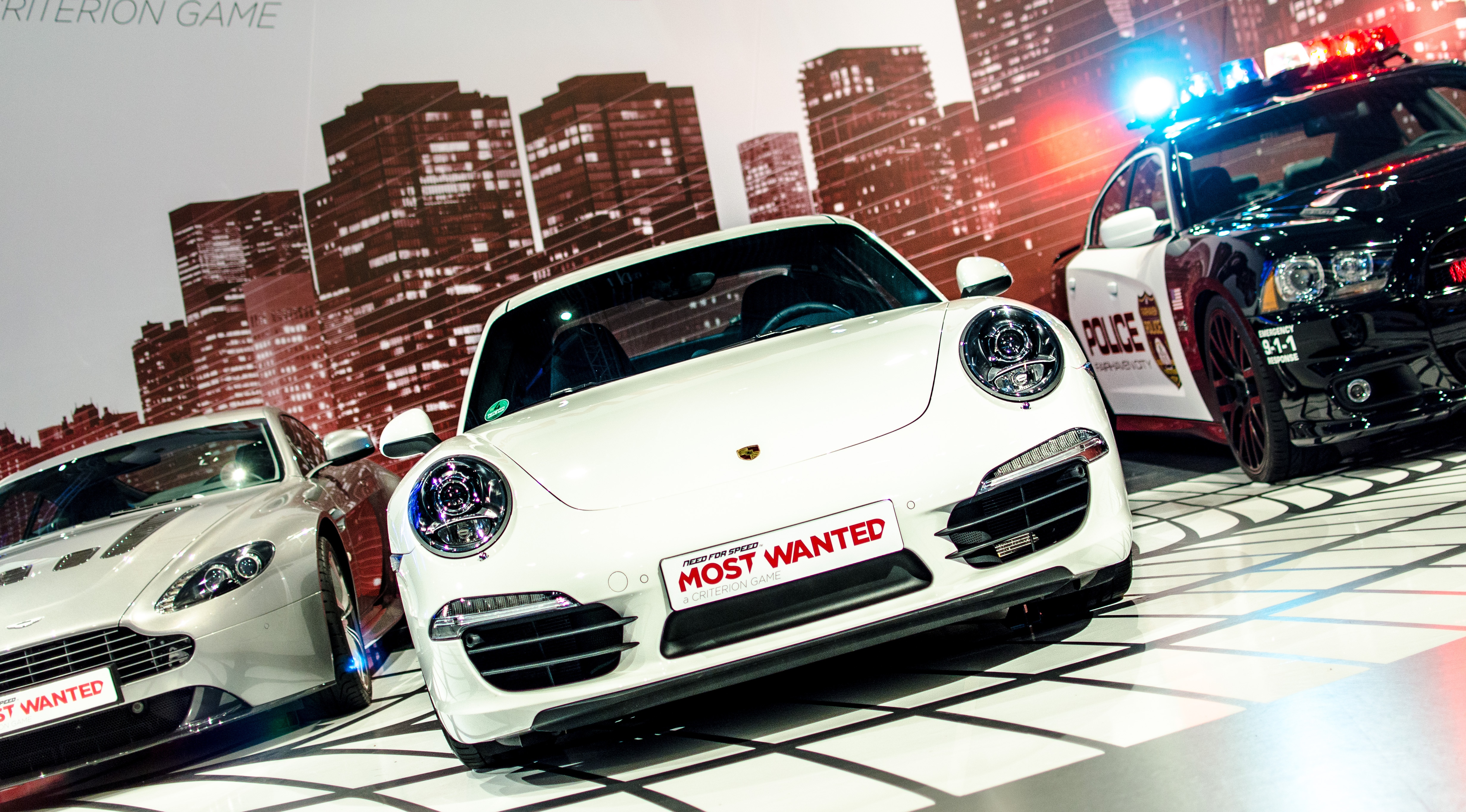
Promotion at Gamescom 2012

Most Wanted racing champion, a two-city event that took the game around the United Kingdom prior to the game's release. The leading UK racer was crowned the UK's Most Wanted champion live on stage at the Golden Joysticks, and received a special Need for Speed: Most Wanted Golden Joystick, one of the first Golden Joysticks to be won by a member of the gaming public, plus a Limited Edition copy of the game.

In addition to the standard edition, a Limited Edition version of the game was available through pre-order at the same price as the regular game. The Limited Edition features numerous bonuses over the standard edition, including "four hours of double Speed Points, custom liveries, pre-customized rollouts and two vehicles: the Porsche 911 Carrera S and the Maserati GranTurismo MC Stradale." EA also collaborated with several retail outlets on pre-order incentives through several store chains throughout the world. Each retailer offered one of three "special edition extra pack", which consists of multiplayer cars with unique modifications that fit different play styles. Which of the "special edition extra pack" the player received depended upon where they pre-order the game. The "special edition extra packs" on offer were the Speed Pack, Strike Pack and Power Pack.

To celebrate the launch of Most Wanted, a contest was held where Facebook users could "like" a picture for the chance to win a VIP kit, which included an iPhone 4S, an iPad 3, a watch, a pair of Converse shoes, a "Get Wanted" cap, and a copy of the game for PlayStation 3 and Xbox 360. A single-player demo was released on 13 November on Xbox Live Marketplace worldwide and the PlayStation Network in North America and on 15 November 2012 on the PlayStation Network in Europe. The demo packs four vehicles, each with their own races, challenges and unlockable mods. Speed Points racked up in the demo also carry over to the full game if the player bought it, up to a cap of 50,000.

On 21 November 2012, EA updated the Need for Speed Autolog iPhone app with support for Most Wanted. The app features the in-game maps, Speed Point tallies, allows to manage friend interactions, change profile picture, view speed walls, and keep up to the latest Most Wanted info via the news feed.

On 1 February 2016, the Windows version of the game was made available for free via Origin's "On the House" program.

=== Trailers ===
In addition to the trailer shown at the official reveal during E3 2012, several other game trailers were released, each revealing new aspects of the game. An episode of PWND, released in August 2012, featured new footage of Need for Speed: Most Wanted, and covered information on the single and multiplayer mode of the game, and the Autolog 2.0. One trailer revealed some of the new cars from the game. Two trailers revealed the multiplayer aspect of the game. One trailer showcased how players will be able to drive any car they find in the open world location of the game. Two trailers revealed the single-player aspect of the game. One trailer showcased the relationship between the cops and racers. An extended version of its live action TV advert splices real footage with some gameplay. A trailer was released to explain the game's Kinect integration. One trailer showed off Wii U gameplay.

=== Downloadable content ===
The first DLC pack for Most Wanted was released on the same day as the game's launch. Dubbed Time Saver Pack, the pack grants the player immediate access to every car in the game's multiplayer, and also marks every car Jackspots on the map in single-player with the exception of the Most Wanted cars.

EA announced the first post-launch DLC for Most Wanted on 6 December 2012. The Ultimate Speed Pack adds five new cars; the Pagani Zonda R, McLaren F1 LM, Lamborghini Aventador J, the Bugatti Veyron Grand Sport Vitesse and Hennessey Venom GT Spyder. The DLC also features a series of new events for each car and a new Most Wanted event. In total, there are 26 new High Speed Races and Speed Runs and 70 more multiplayer milestones, plus additional rewards and unlocks. It was released on 18 December on the Xbox 360 and PlayStation 3 in North America, and on 19 December on PlayStation Network in Europe.

EA announced three new DLC packs for Most Wanted on 26 February 2013. Terminal Velocity is an airport world expansion. It contains two new single player modes along with five new cars: the BMW 1 Series M Coupe, Audi RS3 Sportback, Ford Fiesta ST, Alfa Romeo MiTo QV, and the production model of the Porsche 918 Spyder. It also comes with eight new single-player events, 136 new multiplayer milestones, plus additional rewards and unlocks.

The second and third packs, Movie Legends and NFS Heroes, introduce classic rides from action movies and past Need for Speed games. Movie Legends features five new cars: the Aston Martin DB5, Dodge Charger R/T, Pontiac Firebird Trans-Am, Aston Martin DBS V12, and the Shelby GT500. It also comes with eight new single-player sprint events, 136 new multiplayer milestones, a new Most Wanted event, and additional rewards and unlocks.

NFS Heroes contains five famous cars from Need for Speed history: the Lamborghini Diablo SV from Need for Speed III: Hot Pursuit; the Nissan Skyline GT-R (R34) from Underground; the Nissan 350Z from Underground 2; the Porsche 911 GT2 from Undercover; and the BMW M3 GTR from the 2005 Most Wanted. The DLC also contains a new Most Wanted event, eight new High Speed Races and Speed Runs, 25 new liveries, 136 new multiplayer milestones, plus additional rewards and unlocks. All three packs were released on 26 February 2013 on Xbox 360 and PlayStation 3 in North America (27 February in Europe on PlayStation 3), and on 13 March on Origin, individually and collectively as part of the Deluxe DLC bundle.

On 20 March 2013, Criterion stated that Most Wanted's DLC packs would only be released for the Wii U if the studio saw enough support on Nintendo's format. The Wii U version comes with the Ultimate Speed Pack as standard, but it is missing the Terminal Velocity, Movie Legends and NFS Heroes DLC packs.

A Complete Edition of the game containing all the downloadable content was later released on the Xbox 360, PlayStation 3, and PC on retail and digitally.

== Reception ==
=== Pre-release ===
Need for Speed: Most Wanted was well received by critics at E3 2012 and was awarded with "Best Racing Game" as well as a nomination for "Best Online Multiplayer Game" from Game Critics Awards. Previewers who had access to Need for Speed: Most Wanted called the game a spiritual successor to Criterion's Burnout Paradise, rather than the original Most Wanted from 2005, citing similar gameplay mechanics.

=== Post-release ===
Reception

Aggregate score
Aggregator	Score
Metacritic	iOS: 82/100; PC: 78/100; PS3: 84/100; VITA: 79/100; X360: 84/100; WIIU: 86/100

Review scores
Publication	Score
Computer and Video Games	7.5/10
Destructoid	8.5/10
Edge	9/10
Eurogamer	8/10
G4	4.5/5
Game Informer	9/10
GameSpot	7.5/10
GamesRadar+	4/5
GameTrailers	8.7/10
IGN	9/10
Joystiq	4/5
PlayStation Official Magazine – UK	8/10
Official Xbox Magazine (US)	8.5/10
PC Gamer (US)	85%
TouchArcade	5/5
VideoGamer.com	9/10

Award
Publication	Award
Spike	Best Driving Game

Need For Speed: Most Wanted was met with generally positive reviews, though it was not as acclaimed as Criterion Games' first entry in the franchise. Aggregating review website Metacritic gave the Wii U version 86/100, the PlayStation 3 version 84/100, the PlayStation Vita version 79/100, the Xbox 360 version 84/100 and the PC version 78/100.

In the edition of 22 October 2012 of Edge, the first review score was given as 9/10. The reviewer praised the Criterion racer's "perfectly" pitched handling, "essential" Autolog social features and its "flowing, coherent" world map, which it says blends the styles of previous Burnout and Need for Speed games. The review said of the game, "Once again, Criterion still manages to stand out and offer something fresh, setting a new standard in open-world driving games with – that word again – a seamless feast of quality."

IGN gave the game 9/10, calling "It's undoubtedly one of the year's most exhilarating experiences." Eurogamer gave it an 8/10, and stated "Its sense of character may be not be as forceful as Criterion's other games - but the sense of competition that informs it, the joy of discovery and the plain pleasure of driving haven't been dimmed in the slightest. This isn't quite paradise, but it comes very close."

PlayStation Official Magazine UK gave the game an 8/10, and stated "It's achieved a vicious racing experience that thrills so much more than it frustrates, and it's pushed vehicular multiplayer forward significantly, setting the bar so high it's hard to imagine who can better it." Official Xbox Magazine gave it an 8.5/10, stating "Most Wanted delivers raucous entertainment in spades, whether you're battling Fairhaven City's finest in the campaign or dueling network competition in serious races and silly trick competitions. After years of revisiting Burnout Paradise's recurring playground, we finally have a fresh racing addiction to keep us hooked until Criterion's next seemingly inevitable open-road opus."

The Guardian gave the game a perfect score, stating "Criterion has done it again, setting a new standard for arcade-style racing games which won't be surpassed until the next generation of consoles has been on sale for a while. It actually leaves one feeling a bit sorry for Forza Horizon, which is a very good game, and infinitely superior to its predecessors. But Need For Speed: Most Wanted is, by whatever criteria you may see fit to apply, a great game."

Joystiq gave it a 4/5, stating "Need for Speed: Most Wanted is the next Burnout game fans have clamoring for – it may not say so on the box, but everything about it screams Burnout. The feel of the cars, the physics and the eclectic mix of multiplayer modes are all undeniably Criterion qualities, the things old fans love and the properties that convert new fans with every studio release."

The game was criticised for some negative issues, such as the single-player. GamesRadar, who gave it an 8/10, stated "If you're not big on multiplayer, there's little reason to pick up Most Wanted over, say, heading to the bargain bin for a copy of Burnout Paradise. If you're willing to invest a few hours to learning the game's quirks, however, and are at all interested in racing against your friends online, this suddenly becomes one of the most recommendable arcade racers to come along in the past few years." Destructoid, who gave the game an 8.5/10, stated "There are some scrapes with single-player and a lack of polish here and there, but the multiplayer delivers in such a big way that all of this hardly matters. Need for Speed Most Wanted is that big, crazy, crash-y open-world racer you've been asking for."

The PlayStation Vita version was praised for how close it is to the console versions. GamesRadar stated "Most Wanted on PS Vita uses the same city layout and element placement as the 'big' console versions. Obviously there have to be some graphical concessions to make the game run on the Vita."

The Wii U version was praised for its high-end PC textures and improved night-time lighting. Eurogamer stated "Many ports have failed to impress in the transition to Wii U, but Criterion's tech credentials are second to none and there's a strong argument that Most Wanted U is the best-looking version yet."

During the 16th Annual D.I.C.E. Awards, the Academy of Interactive Arts & Sciences awarded Most Wanted with "Racing Game of the Year", along with receiving a nomination for "Outstanding Achievement in Visual Engineering".

=== Sales ===
According to NPD Group, Most Wanted was the seventh-best selling game in the U.S. in November 2012, at 509,000 copies. However, these figures do not take into account the number of PC units sold, nor sales through digital distribution. Most Wanted was the fifth-best selling game in the United Kingdom in the week of its release, the week's fourth highest new entry. On 31 January 2013, on EA's financial result report of Q3 2013, while sales figures weren't released, it was mentioned Most Wanted outperformed 2011's Need for Speed: The Run. Because of the low sales of Most Wanted on the Wii U and PlayStation Vita, Need for Speed Rivals was not developed for those platforms.
