= D.I.C.E. Award for Racing Game of the Year =

Annual award presented by the Academy of Interactive Arts & Sciences

- Country: United States
- Presented by: Academy of Interactive Arts & Sciences
- First award: 1998
- Currently held by: Mario Kart World
- Website: www.interactive.org

The D.I.C.E. Award for Racing Game of the Year is an award presented annually by the Academy of Interactive Arts & Sciences during the D.I.C.E. Awards. This recognizes "titles that allow the user to participate in a contest in which the objective is to convey an object through a course of virtual physical progress as quickly as possible. Racing games may involve competition against other user-controlled competitors or against system controlled competitors. Racing games must simulate vehicular motion". All active creative/technical, business, and affiliate members of the Academy are qualified to vote for this category. It was originally presented as Console Racing Game of the Year, with its first winner being Diddy Kong Racing, developed and published by Rare.

The award's most recent winner is Mario Kart World, developed by Nintendo EPD and published by Nintendo.

== Winners and nominees ==
=== 1990s ===
Table key
Indicates the winner

Year	Game	Developer(s)	Publisher(s)	Ref.
1997/1998 (1st)	Diddy Kong Racing	Rare	Rare	
1997/1998 (1st)	Mario Kart 64	Nintendo EAD	Nintendo	
1997/1998 (1st)	Moto Racer	Delphine Software International	Electronic Arts	
1997/1998 (1st)	NASCAR 98	Stormfront Studios	Electronic Arts	
1998/1999 (2nd)	Gran Turismo	Polyphony Digital	Sony Computer Entertainment	
1998/1999 (2nd)	Extreme-G 2	Probe Entertainment	Acclaim Entertainment	
1998/1999 (2nd)	F-Zero X	Nintendo EAD	Nintendo	
1998/1999 (2nd)	Need for Speed III: Hot Pursuit	EA Canada, EA Seattle	Electronic Arts	
1999/2000 (3rd)	Star Wars: Episode I Racer	LucasArts	LucasArts	
1999/2000 (3rd)	Crash Team Racing	Naughty Dog	Sony Computer Entertainment	
1999/2000 (3rd)	Driver	Reflections Interactive	GT Interactive	
1999/2000 (3rd)	Gran Turismo 2	Polyphony Digital	Sony Computer Entertainment	

=== 2000s ===
Year	Game	Developer(s)	Publisher(s)	Ref.
2000 (4th)	SSX	EA Canada	Electronic Arts	
2000 (4th)	F355 Challenge	Sega AM2	Sega	
2000 (4th)	Ridge Racer V	Namco	Namco	
2000 (4th)	San Francisco Rush 2049	Midway Games	Midway Games	
2001 (5th)	Gran Turismo 3: A-Spec	Polyphony Digital	Sony Computer Entertainment	
2001 (5th)	NASCAR Thunder 2002	EA Tiburon	Electronic Arts	
2001 (5th)	Project Gotham Racing	Bizarre Creations	Microsoft Game Studios	
2001 (5th)	Splashdown	Rainbow Studios	Infogrames	
2002 (6th)	Need for Speed: Hot Pursuit 2	EA Black Box	Electronic Arts	
2002 (6th)	ATV Offroad Fury 2	Rainbow Studios	Sony Computer Entertainment	
2002 (6th)	MotoGP: Ultimate Racing Technology	Climax Brighton	THQ	
2002 (6th)	NASCAR Thunder 2003	EA Tiburon	Electronic Arts	
2002 (6th)	RalliSport Challenge	DICE	Microsoft Game Studios	
2003 (7th)	Need for Speed: Underground	EA Black Box	Electronic Arts	
2003 (7th)	Burnout 2: Point of Impact	Criterion Games	Acclaim Entertainment	
2003 (7th)	F-Zero GX	Amusement Vision	Nintendo	
2003 (7th)	Mario Kart: Double Dash	Nintendo EAD	Nintendo	
2003 (7th)	Project Gotham Racing 2	Bizarre Creations	Microsoft Game Studios	
2004 (8th)	Burnout 3: Takedown	Criterion Games	Electronic Arts	
2004 (8th)	RalliSport Challenge 2	DICE	Microsoft Game Studios	
2005 (9th)	Need for Speed: Most Wanted	EA Canada, EA Black Box	Electronic Arts	
2005 (9th)	Burnout Revenge	Criterion Games	Electronic Arts	
2005 (9th)	Forza Motorsport	Turn 10 Studios	Microsoft Game Studios	
2005 (9th)	Mario Kart DS	Nintendo EAD	Nintendo	
2005 (9th)	Project Gotham Racing 3	Bizarre Creations	Microsoft Game Studios	
2006 (10th)	Burnout Revenge (Note: Xbox 360 version)	Criterion Games	Electronic Arts	
2006 (10th)	Excite Truck	Monster Games	Nintendo	
2006 (10th)	Full Auto 2: Battlelines	Pseudo Interactive	Sega	
2006 (10th)	Need for Speed: Carbon	EA Canada, EA Black Box	Electronic Arts	
2006 (10th)	Test Drive Unlimited	Eden Games	Atari	
2007 (11th)	MotorStorm	Evolution Studios	Sony Computer Entertainment	
2007 (11th)	Colin McRae: Dirt	Codemasters	Codemasters	
2007 (11th)	Forza Motorsport 2	Turn 10 Studios	Microsoft Game Studios	
2007 (11th)	Need for Speed: ProStreet	EA Black Box	Electronic Arts	
2007 (11th)	Project Gotham Racing 4	Bizarre Creations	Microsoft Game Studios	
2008 (12th)	Burnout Paradise	Criterion Games	Electronic Arts	
2008 (12th)	Race Driver: Grid	Codemasters	Codemasters	
2008 (12th)	Mario Kart Wii	Nintendo EAD	Nintendo	
2008 (12th)	MotorStorm: Pacific Rift	Evolution Studios	Sony Computer Entertainment	
2008 (12th)	Pure	Black Rock Studio	Disney Interactive Studios	
2009 (13th)	Forza Motorsport 3	Turn 10 Studios	Microsoft Game Studios	
2009 (13th)	Colin McRae: Dirt 2	Codemasters	Codemasters	
2009 (13th)	Need for Speed: Shift	Slightly Mad Studios	Electronic Arts	

=== 2010s ===
Year	Game	Developer(s)	Publisher(s)	Ref.
2010 (14th)	Need for Speed: Hot Pursuit	Criterion Games	Electronic Arts	
2010 (14th)	Gran Turismo 5	Polyphony Digital	Sony Computer Entertainment	
2010 (14th)	ModNation Racers	United Front Games, San Diego Studio	Sony Computer Entertainment	
2010 (14th)	Split/Second	Black Rock Studio	Disney Interactive Studios	
2011 (15th)	Forza Motorsport 4	Turn 10 Studios	Microsoft Game Studios	
2011 (15th)	Mario Kart 7	Nintendo EAD	Nintendo	
2011 (15th)	Real Racing 2 HD	Firemint	Electronic Arts	
2012 (16th)	Need for Speed: Most Wanted	Criterion Games	Electronic Arts	
2012 (16th)	Forza Horizon	Playground Games	Microsoft Studios	
2012 (16th)	LittleBigPlanet Karting	United Front Games, San Diego Studio	Sony Computer Entertainment	
2012 (16th)	MotorStorm: RC	Evolution Studios	Sony Computer Entertainment	
2012 (16th)	Trials Evolution	RedLynx	Microsoft Studios	
2013 (17th)	Forza Motorsport 5	Turn 10 Studios	Microsoft Studios	
2013 (17th)	Gran Turismo 6	Polyphony Digital	Sony Computer Entertainment	
2013 (17th)	Grid 2	Codemasters	Codemasters	
2013 (17th)	Need for Speed Rivals	Ghost Games	Electronic Arts	
2013 (17th)	Real Racing 3	Firemonkeys Studios	Electronic Arts	
2014 (18th)	Mario Kart 8	Nintendo EAD	Nintendo	
2014 (18th)	The Crew	Ivory Tower	Ubisoft	
2014 (18th)	Forza Horizon 2	Playground Games	Microsoft Studios	
2015 (19th)	Forza Motorsport 6	Turn 10 Studios	Microsoft Studios	
2015 (19th)	Need for Speed	Ghost Games	Electronic Arts	
2015 (19th)	Project CARS	Slightly Mad Studios	Bandai Namco Entertainment	
2016 (20th)	Forza Horizon 3	Playground Games	Microsoft Studios	
2016 (20th)	Driveclub VR	Evolution Studios	Sony Interactive Entertainment	
2017 (21st)	Mario Kart 8 Deluxe	Nintendo EPD	Nintendo	
2017 (21st)	Dirt 4	Codemasters	Codemasters	
2017 (21st)	Forza Motorsport 7	Turn 10 Studios	Microsoft Studios	
2017 (21st)	Gran Turismo Sport	Polyphony Digital	Sony Interactive Entertainment	
2017 (21st)	Project CARS 2	Slightly Mad Studios	Bandai Namco Entertainment	
2018 (22nd)	Forza Horizon 4	Playground Games	Microsoft Studios	
2018 (22nd)	F1 2018	Codemasters	Codemasters	
2018 (22nd)	Wreckfest	Bugbear Entertainment	THQ Nordic	
2019 (23rd)	Mario Kart Tour	DeNA, Nintendo EPD	Nintendo	
2019 (23rd)	Crash Team Racing Nitro-Fueled	Beenox	Activision	
2019 (23rd)	Dirt Rally 2.0	Codemasters	Codemasters	
2019 (23rd)	F1 2019	Codemasters	Codemasters	
2019 (23rd)	Trials Rising	RedLynx, Ubisoft Kyiv	Ubisoft	

=== 2020s ===
Year	Game	Developer(s)	Publisher(s)	Ref.
2020 (24th)	Mario Kart Live: Home Circuit	Valen Studios	Nintendo	
2020 (24th)	Dirt 5	Codemasters	Codemasters	
2020 (24th)	F1 2020	Codemasters	Codemasters	
2021 (25th)	Forza Horizon 5	Playground Games	Xbox Game Studios	
2021 (25th)	F1 2021	Codemasters	Electronic Arts	
2021 (25th)	Hot Wheels Unleashed	Milestone	Milestone	
2022 (26th)	Gran Turismo 7	Polyphony Digital	Sony Interactive Entertainment	
2022 (26th)	F1 22	Codemasters	Electronic Arts	
2022 (26th)	Need for Speed Unbound	Criterion Games	Electronic Arts	
2023 (27th)	Forza Motorsport	Turn 10 Studios	Xbox Game Studios	
2023 (27th)	F-Zero 99	Nintendo Software Technology	Nintendo	
2023 (27th)	Hot Wheels Unleashed 2: Turbocharged	Milestone	Milestone	
2023 (27th)	Lego 2K Drive	Visual Concepts	2K	
2024 (28th)	F1 24	Codemasters	Electronic Arts	
2024 (28th)	MotoGP 24	Milestone	Milestone	
2024 (28th)	Night-Runners Prologue	Planet Jem	Planet Jem	
2025 (29th)	Mario Kart World	Nintendo EPD	Nintendo	
2025 (29th)	F1 25	Codemasters	Electronic Arts	
2025 (29th)	Kirby Air Riders	Sora Ltd.	Nintendo	
2025 (29th)	Wheel World	Messhof	Annapurna Interactive	

== Multiple nominations and wins ==
=== Developers and publishers ===
Criterion Games and Turn 10 Studios have developed the most racing game award winners, with Codemasters receiving the most nominations as a developer. Bizarre Creations and Evolution Studios both received the most nominations without a win as developers. Electronic Arts has published the most finalists and the most winners. Electronic Arts has also published five consecutive award winners from 2003 to 2007. EA Black Box is the only developer with back-to-back wins for Need for Speed: Hot Pursuit 2 in 2003 and Need for Speed: Underground in 2004. Nintendo and Microsoft Studios also have back-to-back wins as publishers: Microsoft Studios won with Forza Motorsport 6 in 2016 and Forza Horizon 3 in 2017, and Nintendo won with Mario Kart Tour in 2020 and Mario Kart Live: Home Circuit in 2021.

Developers
Developer	Nominations	Wins
Criterion Games	8	5
Turn 10 Studios	8	5
Nintendo EAD/EPD	10	4
Polyphony Digital/Polys Entertainment	7	3
EA Black Box	5	3
Playground Games	5	3
EA Canada	4	2
Codemasters	14	1
Bizarre Creations	4	0
Evolution Studios	4	0
Milestone	3	0
Slightly Mad Studios	3	0
Black Rock Studio	2	0
DICE	2	0
EA Tiburon	2	0
Ghost Games	2	0
Rainbow Studios	2	0
RedLynx	2	0
San Diego Studio	2	0
United Front Games	2	0

Publishers
Publisher	Nominations	Wins
Electronic Arts	27	10
Microsoft/Xbox Game Studios	20	8
Nintendo	15	5
Sony Computer/Interactive Entertainment	15	4
Codemasters	10	0
Milestone	3	0
Namco/Bandai Namco Entertainment	3	0
Acclaim Entertainment	2	0
Disney Interactive Studios	2	0
Sega	2	0
THQ/THQ Nordic	2	0
Ubisoft	2	0

=== Franchises ===
The three most nominated and award-winning franchises, Forza, Need for Speed, and Mario Kart, all have back-to-back wins for Racing Game of the Year:

- Need for Speed: Need for Speed: Hot Pursuit 2 (2003) and Need for Speed: Underground (2004).
- Forza: Forza Motorsport 6 (2016) and Forza Horizon 3 (2017).
- Mario Kart: Mario Kart Tour (2020) and Mario Kart Live: Home Circuit (2021).

Mario Kart 8 and Burnout Revenge are the only games that have been nominated twice; both the Wii U original and the Switch Deluxe versions of Mario Kart 8 have won the awards, while Burnout Revenge has won on its second nomination for the Xbox 360 version. The Dirt franchise has the most nominations without a win.

Franchises
Franchise	Nominations	Wins
Forza	13	8
Need for Speed	12	5
Mario Kart	10	5
Gran Turismo	7	3
Burnout	5	3
F1	7	1
MotorStorm	3	1
Dirt	5	0
Project Gotham Racing	4	0
F-Zero	3	0
NASCAR	3	0
Crash Team Racing	2	0
Grid	2	0
Hot Wheels	2	0
MotoGP	2	0
Project CARS	2	0
RalliSport Challenge	2	0
Real Racing	2	0
Trials	2	0
