= Danger Zone (video game) =

2017 vehicle crashing video game

- Developer: Three Fields Entertainment
- Publisher: Three Fields Entertainment
- Engine: Unreal Engine 4
- Platforms: Microsoft Windows, PlayStation 4, Xbox One
- Release: Windows, PlayStation 4; 30 May 2017; Xbox One; 9 October 2017
- Genre: Racing
- Mode: Single-player

Danger Zone is a video game developed by Three Fields Entertainment. The game involves driving vehicles at high speeds into various traffic situations to cause as much damage as possible. It is directly inspired by the Crash mode in the various Burnout games, which the founders of Three Fields had worked on prior to founding their own studio. It was released in May 2017 on Microsoft Windows and PlayStation 4 systems, and in October 2017 for Xbox One.

== Gameplay ==
The player takes control of a car situated in virtual crash test facility, where one of about twenty scenarios are available, featuring parked or moving vehicles and other obstacles. The player's goal is to score as many points by driving their car into the scenarios (the "First Impact"), creating chain reactions of collisions. If the First Impact causes enough damage, they can then trigger a "SmashBreaker" (similarly to Burnout's "CrashBreaker") that causes their vehicle to explode, creating additional chain reactions for damage. Points are awarded based on the degree of damage done, including special points for unique targets and other scenario-specific goals. Players compete through online leaderboards to obtain the best score.

== Development ==
The founders of Three Fields Entertainment, Fiona Sperry and Alex Ward, were former members of Criterion Games, the studio that developed the Burnout racing series; Burnout, unlike more traditional racing games, had a considerable focus on realistic collisions, and several games in the series included Crash mode, where players purposely drove vehicles into situations to wreck as many other vehicles as possible. As Electronic Arts, the publisher for Burnout, transitioned the studio from Burnout to the Need for Speed series, which was focused primarily on racing, Sperry and Ward left to found Three Fields, with the anticipation of developing a spiritual sequel to Burnout. The studio's first title Dangerous Golf, which is based on causing as much damage by hitting golf balls in enclosed spaces, was used to help develop the necessary tools through the Unreal Engine and middleware such as PhysX towards realizing their Burnout-inspired goal.

Development of Danger Zone started just after the studio published Lethal VR, around December 2016. With three games completed since the studio's founding, they wanted to make sure they could replicate the Burnout Crash mode but now supported with more realistic physics enabled by modern computers and consoles, as at the time of the Burnout series' development, they had to make a number of sacrifices in the physics to have the game play well on older hardware. The team initially thought of setting the game in a crash test facility inspired by those used in real-life, but found the clinical look would be a problem, and instead changed the appearance of the areas to be more industrial, which is how they derived the name for the game. To help the player visualize the course prior to crashing, they took inspiration of showcasing each scenario in segments, inspired by a similar visual tool used in the British show Grand Designs.

== Reception ==
Reception

Aggregate score
Aggregator	Score
Metacritic	64/100 (PC); 64/100 (PS4); 64/100 (XONE)

Danger Zone received "mixed or average" reviews according to video game review aggregator website Metacritic, with all three platforms reaching a 64 out 100 rating.

== Sequel ==
Three Fields announced Danger Zone 2 in June 2018 to arrive the next month for Windows, PlayStation 4, and Xbox One systems. It will follow the same type of gameplay, adding more emphasis on the driving segments, and will have these crash courses take place within settings inspired by real world highways, such as the M1 motorway in England or the freeways near Los Angeles International Airport.
