= Burnout Revenge =

2005 video game

- Developer: Criterion Games
- Publisher: Electronic Arts
- Director: Alex Ward
- Producer: Emily Newton Dunn
- Designers: Paul Cross; Chris Roberts
- Programmers: Hamish Young; Paul Ross
- Artist: Stephen Uphill
- Series: Burnout
- Engine: RenderWare
- Platforms: PlayStation 2, Xbox, Xbox 360
- Release: PlayStation 2, Xbox: NA: 13 September 2005; EU: 23 September 2005; AU: 26 September 2005; Xbox 360: NA: 7 March 2006; PAL: 17 March 2006
- Genre: Racing
- Modes: Single-player, multiplayer

Burnout Revenge is a 2005 racing video game developed by Criterion Games and published by Electronic Arts for PlayStation 2, Xbox and Xbox 360. The game was also made backwards compatible with the Xbox One in May 2018, and the Xbox Series X/S upon the console's launch.

Similar to its predecessor Burnout 3: Takedown, Revenge focuses on a mixture of racing in the midst of rush-hour traffic, and vehicular combat; players use the cars themselves as weapons. Revenge also expands on the combat side of its gameplay with new features such as "traffic checking" (ramming same-way traffic), Vertical Takedowns (landing on a rival car after the player's car drives over a jump), a new game type (Traffic Attack) and significant changes to the gameplay of Crash mode (a game type where players attempt to cause a crash as large as possible).

The online servers for Burnout Revenge were shut down for the PlayStation 2 and Xbox on November 1, 2007. The Xbox 360 servers were shut down on October 24, 2012.

== Gameplay ==
In Burnout Revenge, players compete in a range of racing game types with different aims. These take place within rush-hour traffic and include circuit racing, Road Rage (where players cause as many rivals to crash as possible within a time limit, or until the player's car is wrecked), Burning Lap (a single-lap, single-racer time attack mode), Eliminator (a circuit race where every thirty seconds, the last-placed racer's car is detonated; the race continues until only one racer is left), and Crash (where the player is placed at a junction with the aim of accumulating as many "Crash Dollars" as possible). A new gameplay feature in Burnout Revenge is the ability to ram same-way small to medium traffic, known as "traffic checking", propelling the rammed car forward; the event in which a "checked" car hits a rival is considered as a Traffic Takedown. Traffic checking is the focus of a new race type, Traffic Attack (whereby a player must earn a set amount of Crash Dollars through checking traffic), which can be used later on.

During these events, players have access to a limited amount of boost which is acquired through various dangerous driving techniques, including but not limited to driving on the wrong side of the road, tailgating opponents and drifting. Unique to the series is the concept of battling other rivals; unlike other video games in the racing genre, players are encouraged, and sometimes even required, to ram rival cars and cause traffic to crash. Causing a rival to crash is referred to as a "Takedown", rewarding the player by extending the length of their boost gauge and completely refilling it. In designated events, a boost can also be used to activate a "Crashbreaker" during a crash, detonating the car and causing other nearby cars to crash. When the rival car takes the player down, the player will have to take the ultimate REVENGE by taking down the revenge rivals (which the arrow at the top of the car turned red) and is referred to as a "Revenge Takedown".

In the main single-player game mode, players compete in a world tour consisting of 169 events across three continents, divided into a series of 11 "ranks" (Rank 11 has no events). The ranks to which a player has access to is determined by their "Revenge Rank", which increases after completing events. By increasing their Rank sufficiently, the player "ranks up" and unlocks the next rank of events.

There are 77 cars in the game, some of which can only be used for crash events. The SUVs and saloon cars are some of them.

The game also features support for multiplayer gameplay, both online and offline. In addition to the racing modes, the game features three types of Crash modes: Crash Battle (multiple players attempt a junction at the same time), Crash Party (players take turns at attempting junctions across several rounds), and Crash Tour (a golf-like version of Crash Party, with players attempting to accumulate a certain amount of Crash Dollars in as few attempts as possible; after the last round ends the player with the lowest score wins).

=== Bonus vehicles ===
There are two extra vehicles that can be unlocked by the presence of a saved game from another title on the memory card or hard drive when first creating own profile. A Madden NFL 06 save will unlock the Madden Challenge Bus and a Burnout 3: Takedown save will unlock the Dominator Assassin. Both of these cars are available only for Crash events. They are also available for online use if they own an online adapter. If a save for Black is present, the player unlocks the Black Elite Racer, a car that is usually unlocked at the Elite rank. It features some references from the game, for example, there are bullet holes all around the car, and the number plate on the back reads "Kellar", the player's character in Black. In the Xbox 360 version of the title, the bonus cars are unlocked through different methods, such as completing the final Crash event in rank 1 to unlock the Dominator Assassin and reaching elite rank is the only way to obtain the Black Elite Racer. If the player achieves 100% game completion, which is the game's toughest challenge, it unlocks the Revenge Racer, which was reused in Revenge's successor, Burnout Paradise.

=== Xbox 360 version ===
The Xbox 360 version of Burnout Revenge included several new features and improved the graphics of the game to utilise the power of the console. The game included ten new crash junctions on the Crash Tour. It also included a vastly improved online mode that introduced online Revenge Rivals. This system allowed players to keep track of the number of times they have been taken out or have taken out any given player.

The new version also included a new Burnout Clips feature, which allowed users to save 30-second clips of any offline race played which was shared with other players over Xbox Live.

In May 2018, the Xbox 360 version of Burnout Revenge was made available for backward compatibility with the Xbox One. It was also made available for backwards compatibility on the Xbox Series X/S upon the console's launch.

== Downloadable content ==
The Xbox 360 version of Burnout Revenge was the first game to take advantage of kiosk downloads in North America, where players could take their Xbox 360 Memory Unit to participating stores such as GameStop, Circuit City, and Best Buy, and download new content for the game onto it. The provided content varied between kiosks. Xbox Live Marketplace content was also available in the form of new cars.

== Reception ==
Reception

Aggregate score
Aggregator	Score		
Aggregator	PS2	Xbox	Xbox 360
Metacritic	90/100	89/100	89/100

Review scores
Publication	Score		
Publication	PS2	Xbox	Xbox 360
Edge	8/10	8/10	N/A
Electronic Gaming Monthly	8.83/10	8.83/10	N/A
Eurogamer	N/A	8/10	8/10
Game Informer	9.25/10	9.25/10	9.5/10
GamePro	5/5	5/5	4.5/5
GameRevolution	B+	B+	B+
GameSpot	9.1/10	9.1/10	8.8/10
GameSpy	4.5/5	4.5/5	4.5/5
GameTrailers	9/10	9/10	8.8/10
GameZone	9.1/10	9.2/10	9/10
IGN	8.9/10	N/A	8.9/10
Official U.S. PlayStation Magazine	5/5	N/A	N/A
Official Xbox Magazine (US)	N/A	9.8/10	8.5/10
Detroit Free Press	4/4	N/A	4/4
The Times	4/5	4/5	N/A

Burnout Revenge's PlayStation 2 version received "universal acclaim" from professional critics according to the review aggregator website Metacritic, with the Xbox and Xbox 360 versions receiving "generally favourable" reviews.

Jim Schaefer of Detroit Free Press gave the PS2 a score of all four stars, praising the gameplay, the new features such as Traffic Attack and "traffic checking" system, graphics, the refined Crash mode, soundtrack, and multiplayer. Ryan Huschka later gave the X360 version the same score and stated that it "makes online showdowns much more personal". Greg Edwards of Maxim gave the PS2 and Xbox versions a score 9 out of 10, praising the variety of events, tracks, and online races, the sense of speed, and "smooth" controls. Eliot Fish of The Sydney Morning Herald gave the game four-and-a-half stars out of five and called it "relentlessly intense". Tim Meston of The Times gave four stars out of five, his only complaint being some repetition in the track layout for each stage, but said that it was somewhat reduced by the addition of numerous shortcuts along each route. Scott Jones of the Hartford Courant gave it three stars out of four and called it "a car insurance agent's worst nightmare", and said that the opponents lack personality and that could have some story narrative.

During the 9th Annual Interactive Achievement Awards, the Academy of Interactive Arts & Sciences nominated Burnout Revenge for "Racing Game of the Year" and "Outstanding Achievement in Soundtrack". At the following year's awards ceremony, the Xbox 360 version won the "Racing Game of the Year" award outright.
