= Burnout 3: Takedown =

2004 video game

- European box art
- Developer: Criterion Games
- Publisher: Electronic Arts
- Director: Alex Ward
- Producers: Siobhan Reddy; Rupert Brooker
- Designers: Paul Cross; Chris Roberts
- Programmer: Richard Parr
- Artist: Michael Williamson
- Composer: Stephen Root
- Series: Burnout
- Engine: RenderWare
- Platforms: PlayStation 2, Xbox
- Release: NA: 8 September 2004; AU: 9 September 2004 (Xbox); EU: 10 September 2004; AU: 16 September 2004 (PS2)
- Genre: Racing
- Modes: Single-player, multiplayer

Burnout 3: Takedown is a 2004 racing video game developed by Criterion Games and published by Electronic Arts. It is the third instalment in the Burnout series, which is characterised by fast-paced arcade racing. A staple of the series is the use of boost, earned through risky driving, to rapidly increase a car's speed. The central mechanic introduced in Burnout 3 is Takedowns, which allow players to slam their opponents until they crash. Takedowns work in conjunction with the boost system by filling up and extending the boost meter. Aside from standard circuit races, the game features modes focused on performing Takedowns on rival vehicles and causing monetary damage at a junction occupied with traffic. Each game variant is featured in a single-player campaign mode called the "World Tour," which serves as the primary method for unlocking new and faster cars. The game supports both online and split-screen multiplayer.

Before the creation of Burnout 3: Takedown, UK-based development studio Criterion had been collaborating with publisher Electronic Arts (EA) on a skating video game, but disagreements over the game's creative direction led to its cancellation and falling out between the two companies. EA later approached Criterion about reuniting and partnering on a game, and so Criterion began developing Burnout 3: Takedown in June 2003 on the condition that EA would not interfere in the creative process. Over a year later, EA acquired Criterion and the Burnout series; their high expectations for Burnout 3: Takedown was influential in the acquisition. The game launched in September 2004 on the PlayStation 2 and Xbox video game consoles.

Upon release, Burnout 3: Takedown received critical acclaim, becoming one of the highest-rated racing video games of all time, and is considered to be one of the greatest video games of all time. Critics were enthused by the shift to a more aggressive style of racing game and the addition of gameplay mechanics like Takedowns. The addictive gameplay and visuals were widely praised by reviewers, many of whom ranked Burnout 3: Takedown among the best games released on the PlayStation 2 and Xbox. The game went on to win numerous awards including three from the British Academy Games Awards, two from the Spike Video Game Awards, and one from the Interactive Achievement Awards as well as the Golden Joystick Awards. Retrospective coverage of the game has been highly positive with some publications declaring it as the greatest arcade racer game ever made and the peak of the Burnout series. A successor to Takedown, titled Burnout Revenge, was released in September 2005.

== Gameplay ==
Takedowns are performed by slamming rivals until they crash. A Takedown can fill and extend the boost meter, enabling the player to drive faster.

Burnout 3: Takedown is a racing video game with arcade-style gameplay that emphasizes dangerous and fast-paced driving. The game features standard circuit races which take place on carriageways and city streets populated with traffic. The Single Race mode pits the player against five AI opponents in a single or multiple lap race. During a race, boost, which is earned by acts of reckless driving such as drifting around corners, near misses with traffic, and driving in oncoming lanes, can be used to rapidly increase a car's speed. Boost can be used immediately in Burnout 3, unlike previous Burnout games which required the boost meter to be full. The quickest method for earning boost is a Takedown—a central mechanic introduced in this instalment of the series. A Takedown involves shunting opposing vehicles until they crash. Each one fills the boost meter and can provide an additional boost segment, causing the meter to extend up to four times its initial size. Ramming opponents will cause them to behave more aggressively in return; their level of hostility is indicated by a coloured arrow above their vehicle. When the player crashes or is taken out by an opponent, boost is lost and a bonus boost segment is withdrawn. During the crash sequence, a slow-motion mode called Impact Time can be activated. In Impact Time, the Aftertouch mechanic can be used to manoeuvre the wrecked car chassis into an opponent to get a Takedown, which acts as a recovery move by negating the penalty of crashing.

Road Rage is a new game mode in which the player must achieve a certain number of Takedowns in a preset time limit or before their vehicle is totalled. Cars continuously spawn in Road Rage so that there are always vehicles to perform Takedowns on. The Crash mode from Burnout 2: Point of Impact returns but has been enhanced to accommodate the Aftertouch feature. The goal of Crash mode is to create the largest amount of monetary damage in a multi-vehicle collision at a junction full of traffic. The game includes a total of one hundred Crash junctions. When a set number of vehicles become involved in the pileup, a Crashbreaker is available which allows the player to detonate their vehicle to cause further damage. Cash bonuses, score multipliers, a speed boost, or an immediate Crashbreaker can be obtained by driving through power-ups that lie on the junction in Crash mode. One particular power-up, the Heartbreaker, has a negative effect by reducing the total score.

World Tour is a single-player career mode that combines Single Races, Road Rage, Crash mode, and several other race variants into a series of 173 events spanning ten locations across the United States, Europe, and Asia. Events are presented on a navigation map and a medal is awarded for every one that is completed successfully. World Tour includes Grand Prix events that group several races together into a point-based tournament. Face-Off is a one versus one race event wherein the player is granted with opposing vehicle if they win. Burning Lap is a single lap time-trial event where the player must beat predetermined lap times. Eliminator is a five lap race in which the driver in last place at the end of each lap gets eliminated. The game features 67 vehicles which are divided into classes based on their speed. New and faster cars are unlocked by earning medals in World Tour mode and achieving milestones such as attaining a certain number of Takedowns or causing a certain amount of damage across Crash mode junctions.

Burnout 3 supports split-screen multiplayer and online multiplayer. Five different game modes can be played online in the game. Impact Time is disabled in multiplayer and the gameplay in some modes is tweaked. Single Race is analogous to the single-player version except AI drivers are replaced with other players. Online Road Rage functions differently from offline mode. The online version is a team-based mode that supports up to six players and the objective is to destroy the rival team's cars before a certain number of miles have been driven. The remaining three modes are variations on the Crash mode that can be played online and locally. Team Crush and Double Impact are both two-player modes where both players cause pileups on a Crash junction simultaneously. Team Crush is focused cooperative gameplay while Double Impact is about competing with each other. Party Crash is an eight-player score competition mode where players crash at a junction individually and their scores are compared. In April 2010, online services were shut down. While Xbox Live support for games on the original Xbox ended in 2010, Burnout 3: Takedown is now playable online with Insignia, a revival server restoring online functionality to original Xbox games

== Development ==
=== Background and production ===
Burnout 3: Takedown was developed by Guildford-based video game studio Criterion Games. The studio suffered several setbacks during the sequence of events that led up to the creation of Burnout 3, including the cancellation of a project, a failed pitch, and a fall out with the game's eventual publisher Electronic Arts (EA). In 2002, Criterion was around 130 people divided into two development teams. One team was working on Burnout 2: Point of Impact, a follow-up to Burnout, set to be published by Acclaim Entertainment. The other team had completed the development of the extreme sports game AirBlade for Sony Computer Entertainment Europe. Sony had intentions of continuing to collaborate with Criterion on a sequel to AirBlade, but the AirBlade team turned down the offer. Instead, Criterion began talks with EA, who had a proposal for Criterion to create a remake of the 1988 skateboarding video game Skate or Die!. Criterion was keen to work with EA and started development on the project. Following Burnout 2's release, Criterion prepared a pitch to EA Canada about working on a second game with the publisher. Criterion's proposed title was Need For Speed: Split Second, a stunt racing game within EA's Need for Speed series. Meanwhile, the Skate or Die! remake project was thrown into disarray when EA requested changes to the game's design and the creative direction of the project shifted away from Criterion's vision. With development staff becoming unhappy and stressed about the project, the studio decided to contact EA and cancel the game. EA was displeased with their decision and the relationship between the two companies soured, leading to dissolution of the proposed Need for Speed game.

At the 2003 Electronic Entertainment Expo (E3), Criterion Games' director of design Alex Ward was approached by Bruce McMillan, executive vice president at EA Worldwide Studios. McMillan wanted to reconcile EA's relationship with Criterion and partner with them on a game. Initially, Ward refused, citing their experience of working with the publisher. EA persisted and suggested Criterion make Burnout 3 with them. Originally, the studio was waiting until the next generation of video game hardware launched before starting work on a third instalment. Criterion accepted the deal on the conditions that EA would not interfere with the game's development and that Criterion had the freedom to create the game they wanted. Development on Burnout 3 began immediately after the expo in June 2003, with a larger team of staff working on the game than its predecessors. By January 2004, Criterion had a build of the game ready to demonstrate to EA. The development team had drafted several subtitles for Burnout 3 including Fuel Injection, Crash and Burn, Seek and Destroy, Takedown along with some more ridiculous suggestions like See You in Hell. Internally, they felt that Takedown was not an appealing choice, but the outcome of EA's focus testing proved otherwise. Despite a rocky start in their relationship with EA, Criterion admitted to benefiting from the publisher's experience throughout the course of Burnout 3's development. By July, development on the game was nearly complete with the remaining work confined to bug testing and polishing the experience. At the end of the month, EA acquired Criterion along with the Burnout intellectual property. McMillan stated that their strong expectations for Burnout 3 and ownership of the series were key reasons for buying Criterion.

=== Design ===
Ward noted that EA's snowboarding video game series SSX was an influence for Burnout 3's bolder and brasher nature. There was an emphasis on making the game more aggressive than previous instalments. Ward described Burnout 3 as a game about "fighting through traffic" rather than "racing through traffic". This approach to the game's design led to the introduction of Takedowns, a feature that rewarded the player with boost and points for knocking their opponents off the track. The Takedown mechanic became a focal point of Burnout 3's design and led to other innovations. At first, the team were not convinced by the idea of having the game's camera pan to show the crash of a taken out vehicle while the player was driving, but once it was implemented, they agreed that the feature worked well. From there, they decided to show a player's crash as well, which gave rise to the aftertouch mechanic. The crash mode from Burnout 2 was expanded and redesigned to be more puzzle-based; aftertouch control, crashbreakers, and multiplayer support were added to the mode. They wanted to include ramps in crash events so that vehicles could fly into traffic, but the game's physics system was designed to push cars down on the track to prevent them from taking off during a race. This caused vehicles to descend immediately after driving off a ramp. To bypass this issue they "killed" the vehicle once it hit the ramp, leaving it a wreck that was unaffected by the driving physics.

The game was developed on Criterion's proprietary game engine RenderWare. The graphics engine was improved to give between 50% and 100% faster rendering than in Burnout 2. The increased performance allowed them to add features like real-time radiosity lighting and better environment mapping effects on vehicles. Programmers at the studio were adamant about making the game run at a frame rate of sixty frames per seconds to offer instant response and feedback while driving fast. Since the crash sequences were slower, the higher frame rate was considered less critical than the spectacle of the vehicle collisions. They opted to run the game at thirty frames per second during these instances and dramatically increased the number of particles and debris that were rendered. From an early stage in development, the team wanted to include support for online network play in Burnout 3. They had never explored online play before, so they used Burnout 2 as a test-bed for the feature before integrating it into Burnout 3.

While Criterion had their own audio team to create original music, working with EA allowed them to include licensed music in Burnout 3. EA launched an initiative called EA TRAX in 2002 with the intent of including licensed tracks in all their games. Burnout 3's soundtrack featured over forty songs, delivered in a radio station format presented by DJ Stryker from alternative rock station KROQ-FM. Options were added to modify which songs play during a race or on the menu screen, and the Xbox version supports custom soundtracks.

== Release ==
Criterion and EA officially announced their partnership for Burnout 3: Takedown in March 2004. The game was showcased at several trade shows throughout the year, including E3. Burnout 3: Takedown was released for the PlayStation 2 and Xbox consoles the same year in September worldwide, except in Japan, where the game was released on 14 October and was only available on the PlayStation 2. The PlayStation 2 version of the game included a demo for EA's Need for Speed: Underground 2, which was scheduled to launch a month after Burnout 3. Likewise, the PlayStation 2 and Xbox versions of Underground 2 included a demo for Burnout 3. In 2008, the Xbox version of Burnout 3 was re-released as a downloadable emulated package for the Xbox 360 console as part of Microsoft's Xbox Originals scheme.

== Reception ==
=== Critical reviews ===
Reception

Aggregate score
Aggregator	Score
Metacritic	93/100 (PS2); 94/100 (Xbox)

Review scores
Publication	Score
Edge	9/10
Eurogamer	9/10
Game Informer	9.25/10
GameSpot	9.5/10
GameSpy	5/5
GamesTM	10/10
IGN	9.4/10 (PS2); 9.5/10 (Xbox)

Burnout 3: Takedown received "universal acclaim" from professional critics on both platforms according to review aggregator website Metacritic. Based on the game's Metascore, it was ranked the second best video game on both platforms in 2004. It is also the highest scoring Xbox racing game of all time and the second highest scoring PlayStation 2 racing game of all time on Metacritic.

GameSpot editor Jeff Gerstmann opened his review by calling Burnout 3: Takedown one of the best racing games of all time, noting that it stood out among contemporaries in the diverse and expanding genre. He felt the quality of the game was high enough to recommend it to gamers who were impartial to driving games. Edge magazine regarded Burnout 3 to be Criterion's finest work to date; they thought the studio had demonstrated their proficiency by revising the series structure and dynamic. They were also mindful of how Burnout 3 offered fun and exhilarating experiences while other developers were prioritising realism in their games. Andrew Reiner of Game Informer wrote that the addition of significant gameplay mechanics had helped craft one of the most addictive racing games ever made. GamesTM awarded it a perfect score; they proclaimed that Burnout 3 was without a doubt the greatest racing game ever made and described playing it as the most fun they had ever had in the genre. GameSpy reviewer Miguel Lopez, who also awarded the game a perfect score, remarked that it was possibly the best arcade racer ever made.

Reception towards the introduction of Takedowns was highly positive. Reviewers admired the impact that Takedowns had in transforming the boost mechanic and shifting the game's focus to a more aggressive style of driving. GamesTM pointed out that the hostile behaviour of AI rivals supplemented the system by presenting more opportunities to perform Takedowns, culminating in an intense and dramatic racing experience. Lopez explained that Burnout 3 had intelligently integrated elements of vehicular combat games by introducing Takedowns. Gerstmann commended the game's use of Impact Time and Aftertouch mechanics, which he believed made crashing an entertaining aspect of the game, unlike other racers. IGN's Fran Mirabella III was amazed by the crash system; he considered it to be far ahead of anything that had been done before.

The expanded and refined Crash mode was embraced by critics who found the gameplay to be addictive. Reiner highlighted Crash mode as his favourite part of the game, and Eurogamer writer Kristan Reed stated that it was the mode he spent the most time playing. Edge welcomed the inclusion of ramps and aftertouch, stating that the design of the mode had become "more complex and focused". They thought Crash mode had evolved into a substantial component that was capable of being released as a standalone product. Mirabella and Reed both complimented the balance and variation of events in World Tour, and GamesTM was pleased with the amount of content featured in the single-player component. Gerstmann agreed that Burnout 3 offered a large amount of content and excellent replay value. He also felt that the progression of difficulty in World Tour was done effectively by introducing faster cars throughout the campaign at reasonable pace. Reviewers were in agreement that Burnout 3's engaging and frenetic gameplay remained intact during online play. Reed stated that he would have liked to see the single-player content become more integrated into the online component, citing other existing racing games as examples. He thought that progress across single-player events should be recorded in online leaderboards enabling score comparisons with friends. Mirabella believed Criterion had largely triumphed in creating a great online component.

The game's visuals and spectacle were lauded by critics who suspected that it would amaze players. Reed questioned whether it was the best looking game to have ever been made. Critics observed that the use of high frame rate and motion blur helped convey an incredible sense of speed. Other aspects such as particle effects, reflections, and real-time deformation drew praise as well. Critics expressed approval over the sound design of the cars and collisions, but opinions of the licensed soundtrack and DJ were less favourable. Some writers found the DJ's enthusiastic dialogue to be annoying and had mixed opinions on the songs included in the soundtrack, but were thankful for the available audio customisation options.

=== Accolades ===
Burnout 3: Takedown received numerous awards from the video games media and independent awards organisations following its release. Official U.S. PlayStation Magazine and Official U.S. Xbox Magazine both ranked Burnout 3: Takedown as their "Game of the Year" ahead of Grand Theft Auto: San Andreas and Halo 2 respectively. Eurogamer staff rated Burnout 3 in ninth place on their list of the top fifty games of 2004. GameSpot named it the best Xbox game of September 2004, and it won the publication's annual "Best Driving Game" award across all platforms. At the 2nd British Academy Games Awards, Burnout 3 won three awards in the "PS2", "Racing", and "Technical Direction" categories, and received three further nominations in the "Art Direction", "Online Multiplayer", and "Xbox" categories. Burnout 3 won "Racing Game of the Year" and was nominated for "Console Game of the Year" at the 8th Annual Interactive Achievement Awards. For its showcase at E3 2004, Burnout 3 won "Best Racing Game" from the Game Critics Awards. At the 2004 Golden Joystick Awards, Burnout 3 won the "PlayStation 2 Game of the Year" category and was a runner-up for "Online Game of the Year". At the 2004 Spike Video Game Awards, Burnout 3 won "Best Driving Game" and was nominated for "Game of the Year". It also won the viewer's choice award for "Most Addictive Game". Alex Ward and Criterion were nominated for "Designer of the Year" for their work on Burnout 3.

=== Commercial performance ===
Burnout 3: Takedown debuted at number one in the UK software chart. During the game's launch week in the UK, 57% of sales were for the PlayStation 2 and 43% were for the Xbox. The game became the fourth fastest selling Xbox title ever in the UK. Sales of the PlayStation 2 version increased by 32% the following week. In Europe as a whole, Burnout 3 sold above 1 million units by the end of September 2004. The game's PlayStation 2 version ultimately received a "Platinum" sales award from the Entertainment and Leisure Software Publishers Association (ELSPA), indicating sales of at least 300,000 copies in the United Kingdom. In Australia, Burnout 3 placed in third and ninth respectively in the PlayStation 2 and Xbox software charts at launch. The game performed strongly in Japan, achieving 32,000 sales during launch week and debuted in second place on the software charts. By July 2006, the PlayStation 2 version of Burnout 3 had sold 900,000 copies and earned $28 million in the United States. Next Generation ranked it as the 65th highest-selling game launched for the PlayStation 2, Xbox or GameCube between January 2000 and July 2006 in that country. Combined console sales of Burnout games released in the 2000s reached 2.3 million units in the United States by July 2006.

== Legacy ==
In 2005, Criterion launched their follow-up to Burnout 3: Takedown, titled Burnout Revenge. Revenge retained Takedowns but continued to evolve the aggressive style of driving by introducing new features such as the ability to knock traffic out of the way and into opponents. With Revenge, Criterion wanted to set the game on its own path rather than just recreate Burnout 3 again. Ward admitted that later Burnout games may not have recaptured the same quintessential feeling that Burnout 3 did. He considered Burnout 3 to be the game that he was most proud of working on and a high point for the studio.

Retrospective coverage of Burnout 3: Takedown has been overwhelmingly favourable, with many publications considering it to be among the best games released for the PlayStation 2 and Xbox consoles, as well as one of the greatest racing games ever made. Edge magazine called the game a pivotal moment for the series and reflected positively on the fundamental changes that had Criterion made in designing it. They praised the game for being balanced all round while noting that later instalments like Revenge and Dominator had pushed the series too far in a particular direction, consequently diluting a lot of what Burnout 3 had accomplished. IGN reaffirmed these thoughts in 2015, by declaring the game as the most perfect arcade racer ever conceived and the peak of the series. In the same year, USgamer listed Burnout 3: Takedown as the twelfth best game since 2000, stating that it remained at the forefront of the arcade racing genre.
