= Speedboat Attack =

1997 video game

- Cover art for the game
- Developer: Criterion Studios
- Publisher: Telstar Electronic Studios
- Platform: Windows
- Release: 1997
- Genre: Racing

Speedboat Attack is a 1997 speedboat racing and vehicular combat video game developed by Criterion Studios and published by Telstar Electronic Studios for Windows.

== Gameplay ==
At its core, the gameplay of Speedboat Attack revolves around high-speed maneuvering of a boat around 10 distinct courses, from the paradisiac coastal landscapes of the Balearic Loop to the otherworldly Terra Incognita. Players must pass through checkpoints to receive a time extension and avoid running out of time. There are 3 difficulty levels in total: newcomer, master, and ace. As the difficulty level increases, there is less time to reach the next checkpoint and competing boats will pose more of a challenge. The player may choose one of 5 boat types, each one differing with respect to acceleration, speed, handling and armor. During a race, it is possible to toggle between different views, such as cockpit view and third-person view.

The game can be played in two configurations: "Race" keeps the focus on outmaneuvering opponents and beating the clock, whereas "Combat" provides a more action-oriented and dynamic experience. There are many elements exclusive to the "Combat" mode, including hazards and ammunition pickups for the machine gun and rocket launcher, as well as shortcuts.

Cockpit view gameplay in Speedboat Attack. It has a radar map, a damage indicator and ammo counters.

When a boat is under fire, any hits landed will make its armor meter decrease, greatly reducing its speed. This meter can only be refilled at a repair dock. Therefore, players are encouraged to avoid any damage while maintaining a high pace.

Speedboat Attack offers 3 different modes. Time trial mode is a straightforward race against the clock, where the players are able to save and compete against their best times. Arcade mode pits the player against 5 competing boats to see who is the fastest. Championship mode consists of a series of races following a league format, often with slightly modified versions of previous courses (for example, racing during nighttime). Lastly, the game also has a multiplayer element, both locally and online via LAN or through the Internet.

== Reception ==
Reception

Review scores
Publication	Score
Computer Games Magazine	1/5
GameStar	57/100
PC Games (DE)	75%
PC PowerPlay	30/100
PC Jeux	74%

Speedboat Attack was met with mixed reviews.

The game was received favourably by PC Games' Thomas Borovskis, who felt that the controls were very precise and the graphics made a good impression. As a result, graphics and controls were rated at the level of 80%, with elements such as sound design evening out the overall score to 75%. The French magazine PC Jeux gave it a rating of 74%, summarizing it as "an original subject with good graphics and interesting circuits".

Other reviews were less favourable. GameStar awarded a score of 57 out of 100, making it clear that, while the game was not an absolute disaster, it was held down by the "unimaginative" and "boring" track design. PC PowerPlay's review had a more negative tone, giving it a score of 30 out of 100.

Computer Games Magazine's Tom Chick gave the game 1 out of 5 stars, remarking that "the controls feel more like you're scrolling the scenery rather than driving a boat" and that "the combat seems to have been an afterthought". He was also critical of the overall presentation of the game, pointing out the flat cardboard cutout look of its visuals, and describing its soundtrack as "something from a porno flick".
