= Dangerous Golf =

2016 miniature golf video game

- Developer: Three Fields Entertainment
- Publisher: Three Fields Entertainment
- Engine: Unreal Engine 4
- Platforms: Microsoft Windows, PlayStation 4, Xbox One
- Release: 3 June 2016
- Genre: Sports
- Modes: Single player, multiplayer

Dangerous Golf is a miniature golf game developed by Three Fields Entertainment, a studio formed by former Criterion Games founders and developers Fiona Sperry and Alex Ward. The game, as stated by the studio, is a mix of Burnout, Black, and NBA Jam, in which players attempt to cause the most destruction by playing miniature golf within a confined space, such as a china shop or a kitchen. The game was released for Microsoft Windows, PlayStation 4, and Xbox One in June 2016.

== Gameplay ==
Dangerous Golf features around one hundred different miniature golf holes situated in spaces with many destructible objects, including a china shop, a kitchen, a bathroom, a gas station, and a palace. Players take turns to try to hit their ball into the hole, but points (in the form of monetary value) are awarded for making trick shots, and for destroying as many of the objects in the room as possible. Further, players have the opportunity to turn their golf ball into a "SmashBreaker", a miniature bomb to cause even more damage, if they destroy enough objects with their shot. Other obstacles include courses that include multiple rooms, the use of teleporters, and special objectives that score more points if the player meets them. Failure to sink the ball into the hole's cup in the fixed number of shots will deduct a large monetary value from the player's score.

The game supports a party mode for up to eight players online, as well as local multiplayer.

== Development ==
The founders of Three Fields are Fiona Sperry and Alex Ward, the founders and developers at Criterion Games who worked on both the Burnout and Need for Speed series. Sperry considered Burnout as one of the more enjoyable and popular games they had developed, particular its Crash modes and the mini-game Burnout Crash!, where the goal was to drive a car into an area and cause as much destruction as possible. When Criterion, after its purchased by Electronic Arts, moved away from the Burnout series and dedicated more staff towards Need for Speed, Sperry and Ward opted to leave the company in late 2013. After waiting out the termination of their contracts, they then formed Three Fields, along with another Criterion developer Paul Ross. More former Criterion staff would follow: as of May 2016, nine of the eleven developers at Three Fields are former Criterion developers. The name Three Fields is based on the notion that all the founding employees had skills within all three fields of their business, design, art and engineering.

Three Fields was formed with the intent to create a spiritual successor to the Burnout series on their own. Though this was their long-term goal, they did not anticipate that a game like Dangerous Golf would be their first title as a new studio, but found later that this would be a useful step towards their larger goals. Three Fields wanted to make a game that was similar to an arcade game, that was fast and fun. The idea of a golf game came from the documentary The Short Game, about 7- and 8-year old golfers, and from videos from the "Dude Perfect" YouTube channel that featured seemingly-impossible basketball trick shots. The three recognized that a golf game centered around trick shots alongside the destruction they wanted from Burnout was an ideal concept. The concept was "stupid" and "ridiculous" for a golf game in the same manner that Burnout had been for racing games, being a light-hearted scoring challenge with much destruction. Similar arcade-style sports video games like NBA Jam served as some inspiration for Dangerous Golf in how to present a sports game that wasn't focused on the sports aspect.

Prototyping for the game started with the palace concept with all the fine china that would be present, however they also took inspiration from the movie Clerks to come up with the idea of a gas station/convenience store as a setting. Ward noted they wanted to make a level taking place in a bakery shop, inspired by the Magnolia Bakery chain in New York, but believed they would have difficulty in simulating the destruction of foodstuffs for their first development effort, and see its potential as a future goal for the company. The amount of destruction they envisioned also helped them to recognize the capabilities of modern hardware to model and render detailed destruction, physics, and liquid interactions, the central element that would be needed in a Burnout successor. While a mobile game would have potentially given them the same lessons while also being an easier target for their small team, they felt they needed to be on the computer and console platforms, enabled by the capabilities of new Application programming interfaces provided by Epic Games and Nvidia. The team had originally started development using the Unity engine, but about ten months in switched to Epic's Unreal 4 engine which had more powerful capabilities for the game. Though none of the developers had worked with that engine before, they had technical help from developers at Epic's Guildford office. Additional middleware includes Nvidia's PhysX and APEX systems, and they further reviewed SIGGRAPH papers to find methods to better simulate and render the destruction caused by the player in a realistic manner.

Development of Dangerous Golf has been wholly supported by personal funds from the company's founders, and they have not sought any publisher to aid in finances. According to Three Fields, if the game is successful enough for the company, they will begin working on their next project: a racing game. The developers announced that they had started work on this next project in July 2016.

Dangerous Golf was originally set to be released in May 2016, but subsequently delayed; the game was released on 3 June 2016 for Microsoft Windows, PlayStation 4, and Xbox One.

On release, the game had received criticism for some lacking features, such as a lack of keyboard and mouse controls. Three Fields has patched the game to addressed and add new features; a patch in July 2016 included adding an introductory tutorial video voiced by Ted Stryker, who had done similar narration for Burnout 3.

== Reception ==
Reception

Aggregate scores
| Aggregator | Score |
|---|---|
| Metacritic | (PC) 54/100 (PS4) 56/100 (XONE) 63/100 |
| OpenCritic | 21% recommend |

Review scores
| Publication | Score |
|---|---|
| Destructoid | 3/10 |
| Game Informer | 8/10 |
| GameSpot | 4/10 |
| IGN | 6/10 |
| PC Gamer (US) | 35/100 |
| Polygon | 7/10 |
| VideoGamer.com | 5/10 |

Dangerous Golf received "mixed or average" reviews, according to video game review aggregator Metacritic. Fellow review aggregator OpenCritic assessed that the game received weak approval, being recommended by only 21% of critics. It was compared to the Crash mode in the Burnout series.
