= Burnout (video game) =

2001 racing video game

- Developer: Criterion Games
- Publisher: Acclaim Entertainment
- Director: Alex Ward
- Designer: Chris Roberts
- Programmer: Richard Parr
- Artists: Michael Williamson; Trevor Moore
- Composers: Steve Emney; Stephen Root
- Series: Burnout
- Engine: RenderWare
- Platforms: PlayStation 2 GameCube; Xbox
- Release: PlayStation 2: NA: 1 November 2001; EU: 16 November 2001; GameCube & Xbox: NA: 30 April 2002; EU: 3 May 2002
- Genre: Racing
- Modes: Single-player, multiplayer

Burnout is a 2001 racing video game developed by Criterion Games and published by Acclaim Entertainment. It was released for the PlayStation 2 in 2001 and GameCube and Xbox in 2002. It is the first instalment in the Burnout series.

== Gameplay ==
The main gameplay mode in Burnout is the Championship mode, which is a selection of events with three or four races in each. Here the player competes against three other cars on various courses styled on European and American locations. Each event gets harder and requires the player to use faster cars to reach first place. After completing each event, a Face Off challenge is unlocked which in turn unlocks a new car if won. Other modes include single race, time attack, and 2-Player. Single race is a mode where the player races against three opponents. In a time attack, the player must finish a lap in a certain amount of time.

Each location is connected in "Sprints", so hypothetically one could drive from River City (Paris) and end up in Harbour Town (the Costa del Sol) in a matter of seconds. On completion of all the 'European' and 'American' events, two 'endurance' modes are unlocked, allowing the player to drive through both these locations in a single race, as well as the three American locations. Completing these can take between 15 and 20 minutes. Each location has a distinct collection of traffic that distinguishes one continent from the next; e.g. American taxi cabs versus European taxi cabs and so forth.

Burnout features a small collection of cars, including the small Supermini, the Saloon, the Pickup and the Muscle.

The tracks feature road traffic, oncoming traffic, cross junctions, and obstacles which can make driving at high speeds difficult. To travel faster, the player needs to accumulate Boost. The Boost meter can be powered up by driving down the wrong side of the road, drifting around corners at high speeds, narrowly avoiding traffic, completing a lap without crashing, or swerving to avoid a collision. Colliding with traffic or scenery will cause the car to crash. The crash is then shown from several different angles, and a replacement car then appears without damage, but with a loss of some accumulated boost. The accumulated boost can only be unlocked by filling the boost meter. This can then be used to produce a Burnout (an increased acceleration of the vehicle) until the boost meter is empty. While the boost is activated, the player can continue to drive dangerously which rewards the player with more boost in their bar when their original boost bar is fully depleted, allowing the driver to chain burnouts together if they are skilled enough. Burnout Dominator attempted to bring back the Burnout feature, which was changed in releases between the two games.

== Development ==
Burnout was in development for almost two years prior to its release in November 2001. The 1976 French short film C'était un rendez-vous and the 1998 film Ronin influenced the conception of Burnout. Alex Ward, the creator of Burnout, said the inspiration for the racing game was the DVD version's 15th chapter, which is titled "Crashing the Case", and shows a crash between two opposing cars.

== Reception ==
Reception

Aggregate score
Aggregator	Score		
Aggregator	GameCube	PS2	Xbox
Metacritic	78/100	79/100	75/100

Review scores
Publication	Score		
Publication	GameCube	PS2	Xbox
Computer and Video Games	N/A	8/10	N/A
Edge	N/A	8/10	N/A
Electronic Gaming Monthly	8/10	7/10	8/10
Eurogamer	8/10	8/10	N/A
Game Informer	7.75/10	7.75/10	7.75/10
GamePro	4/5	4/5	3.5/5
GameRevolution	N/A	C−	N/A
GameSpot	7.3/10	8/10	7.3/10
GameSpy	3/5	83%	N/A
GameZone	8.5/10	7.8/10	8.5/10
IGN	7.8/10	8.6/10	7.6/10
Nintendo Power	4.5/5	N/A	N/A
Official U.S. PlayStation Magazine	N/A	4.5/5	N/A
Official Xbox Magazine (US)	N/A	N/A	8/10
FHM	N/A	5/5	N/A

Burnout received "favorable" reviews on all platforms according to video game review aggregator website Metacritic.
