= Scorched Planet =

1996 video game

- European cover art
- Developer: Criterion Studios
- Publisher: Virgin Interactive
- Platforms: Windows, DOS, Arcade
- Release: November 13, 1996
- Genres: Vehicular combat, first-person shooter

Scorched Planet is a 1996 vehicular combat video game developed by Criterion Studios and published by Virgin Interactive for DOS and Windows. The game was later adapted for arcade machines.

== Gameplay ==
Scorched Planet is a vehicular shooter game taking place in the year 2230 on the fictional planet Dator 5. The planet is being attacked by an alien race, called the Voraxians. The player plays as Alex Gibson, an ex-fighter pilot tasked with saving the colonists on Dator 5. The player must fight off waves of Voraxians on 19 different missions in order to save all the colonists.

The player has a choice to rush in and attack or lay out defenses before starting the missions. The primary mechanic of the game is that your Type 16 fighter, you can morph between tank and spacecraft form, each having their own perks and downsides. The game takes place over 7 different landscapes, each having unique enemies. After completing all 19 missions, the game is complete and the colonists are saved.

== Reception ==
Next Generation reviewed the arcade version of the game, rating it two stars out of five, and stated that "really, the only unusual aspect of the game is that vehicles can morph between a flying ship and a tank, each with its own capabilities and weapons. But that's hardly enough to maintain attention spans into the wee hours of the morning".
