= Burnout (series) =

Racing video game series

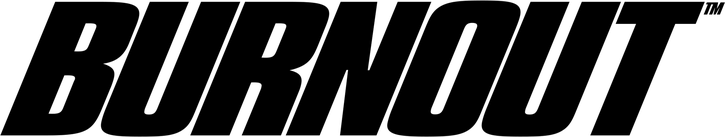
- Genre: Racing
- Developers: Criterion Games; EA UK
- Publishers: Acclaim Entertainment (2001–2002); Electronic Arts (2004–present)
- Platforms: GameCube; iOS; Microsoft Windows; Nintendo DS; Nintendo Switch; PlayStation 2; PlayStation 3; PlayStation 4; PlayStation Portable; Xbox; Xbox 360; Xbox One
- First release: Burnout; 1 November 2001
- Latest release: Burnout Paradise Remastered; 16 March 2018

Burnout is a series of racing video games developed by Criterion Games. The first two games were published by Acclaim Entertainment, while later instalments were published by Electronic Arts. Burnout revolves around high-speed arcade-style racing with a strong emphasis on damage, collisions and explosions.

== History ==
Release timeline
2001	Burnout
2002	Burnout 2: Point of Impact
2003
2004	Burnout 3: Takedown
2005	Burnout Legends
2005	Burnout Revenge
2006
2007	Burnout Dominator
2007	Burnout Mobile
2008	Burnout Paradise
2009
2010
2011	Burnout Crash!
2012
2013
2014
2015
2016
2017
2018	Burnout Paradise Remastered

Burnout's origins came by way of Criterion Games, a division of Criterion Software Ltd. established in 1999 to showcase the type of games that its RenderWare game engine was capable of, with Fiona Sperry in charge. Their first game was a fast-paced skateboarding game, TrickStyle, published by Acclaim Entertainment for the Dreamcast and released in 1999. As a follow-up title, Sperry's team, now with Alex Ward on board, developed a racing game that showed off the capabilities of the newest iteration of RenderWare, named Burnout, also published by Acclaim in 2001. Burnout was aimed to be an arcade-style racer, placing fun over realism as series like Gran Turismo offered.

A sequel, Burnout 2: Point of Impact, was released by Acclaim in 2002. Besides races, Burnout 2 introduced the series' signature "Crash mode", in which players would drive a car into a tableau of other cars and objects to try to do as much damage as possible. At this point in the series, the games were focused on driving on rural and country roads, and while the crashing mechanics were part of the game, these were not emphasized as gameplay elements but simply the undesirable, though often spectacular, result of a collision.

In 2004, Acclaim filed for bankruptcy and sold off its existing properties to other publishers. Electronic Arts (EA) acquired Criterion Games as well as the rights to the Burnout series and RenderWare for an estimated US$48 million that year. EA had been interested in Criterion before from their TrickStyle game, and were initially in 2002 hoping for them to expand that out to be an open-world type skateboarding game under the Skate or Die! moniker, similar to the popularity of Grand Theft Auto III. Criterion however could not find a way for that to work and the project was dropped; it is believed by journalists that this would ultimately be released in the 2007 game Skate by EA Black Box. The cancelled project left some animosity between Criterion and EA, but in 2003, EA reached out to Criterion, wanting to resolve the matter and to have them work on a second Burnout sequel. Criterion agreed as long as EA left them with creative control over the title. The game was near completion in 2004 by the time of Acclaim's bankruptcy and EA's acquisition.

Burnout 3: Takedown took the series in a different route, as Criterion incorporated some of the more combative elements from the SSX series, such that players were "fighting through traffic" rather than just "racing through traffic", according to Ward. Players were able to ram into opponents to focus them into crashes ("Takedowns"), which not only temporarily knocked them out from racing in a similar way to the weapons used in games such as Mario Kart, but also benefit the player by providing some boosting effects. Burnout 3 was highly successful, with more than 2.3 million copies sold through 2006 in the United States alone.

Criterion continued to develop additional Burnout games, culminating in Burnout Paradise in 2008. Paradise was envisioned by Ward as putting the Burnout series in an open world, giving players the option of what routes to take to complete races, alongside other traditional game modes, while adding a social element to the game.

A J2ME version for mobile phones of Burnout was released in 2007, some time before Paradise. This game was developed by Rovio Entertainment.

=== Relation to the Need for Speed series ===
Around 2008–2009, some of Criterion's staff had jokingly asked if they could work on an installment in the Need for Speed franchise, which put more focus on stunt-type driving than collisions. The series' games had been bounced between several of EA's internal studios. EA allowed them to develop a title, 2010's Hot Pursuit which was both critically and financially successful and led to Criterion becoming the lead studio for the Need for Speed franchise. Hot Pursuit and its 2012 follow up, Most Wanted, were noted to feature elements from the Burnout series.

In 2013, oversight of the Need for Speed series was transferred to EA's newly formed subsidiary, Ghost Games, as well as 80% of the developers at Criterion; the remaining staff served as advisors. In April of that year, Alex Ward said that Criterion would be steering away from the racing genre, placing the future of the Burnout series into question. Sperry and Ward would ultimately leave Criterion in early 2014 and later form a new studio, When Tides Turn (Formerly Three Fields Entertainment). As the IP for Burnout still remains with EA, the studio would spend several years working through smaller game ideas to develop a spiritual successor to the Burnout series, with Dangerous Driving being the first game meant to capture several aspects of the series.

In 2019, development of the Need for Speed series was reverted back to Criterion; Ghost Games would be reverted to its original name as EA Gothenburg and became a Frostbite Engine support studio. That year's instalment, Need for Speed Heat, would also feature loose elements from the Burnout series, such as billboard destruction, ramps located throughout the game world, and a diverse terrain. In 2020, Criterion would once again become the lead developer for the franchise with Need for Speed Unbound being released in 2022.

== Gameplay ==
Aggregate review scores
Game	Metacritic
Burnout	(PS2) 79 (GC) 78 (Xbox) 75
Burnout 2: Point of Impact	(GC) 89 (Xbox) 88 (PS2) 86
Burnout 3: Takedown	(Xbox) 94 (PS2) 93
Burnout Legends	(PSP) 86 (NDS) 38
Burnout Revenge	(PS2) 90 (Xbox) 89 (X360) 89
Burnout Dominator	(PS2) 76 (PSP) 76
Burnout Paradise	(X360) 88 (PS3) 87 (PC) 87 (PS4) 81 (XONE) 80 (NS) 75
Burnout Crash!	(iOS) 77 (PS3) 69 (X360) 66

The most notable feature that the series is known for is its Crash mode. This series is well known for its emphasis on aggressive driving and high speed. In-race rewards are given to a player if they take risks such as driving towards oncoming traffic or deliberately attempting to make their opponents crash. In Burnout 3: Takedown the latter action, referred to in-game as a "takedown", was showcased extensively and gave rewards such as points and boost when successfully performed.

It was not the racing element of the game but the slow motion replays of crashes that show the cars being deformed realistically that brought Burnout to the attention of the public. Criterion picked up on this and introduced a special "Crash Mode" as part of Burnout 2: Point of Impact. In this mode, players are instructed to cause as much damage as possible by crashing their vehicle into traffic in a specially designed level featuring "crash junctions", areas where many vehicles are passing by (such as a highway). During these events, traffic is constantly the same, utilizing a trial-and-error method to succeed. The mode was excluded from Burnout Paradise due to the arrival of Burnout Crash!. Instead, it is replaced with a "Showtime" mode, which allows the player to crash "anywhere, anytime". Point of Impact also introduced a Pursuit mode, where the player drives a special police car and must chase down a speeding racer and stop them before the racecourse ends. This mode was discontinued, but was featured in Burnout Legends and has reappeared as an available upgrade for purchase in Burnout Paradise known as Cops And Robbers.

The takedown element of Burnout 3: Takedown is what differentiates it from other racing games. It is an essential strategy for winning races, especially in single player. There is also a "Road Rage" mode in which the object is to takedown as many opponents as possible.

Burnout Revenge introduced the "traffic check" feature, which made it possible for the player to hit smaller traffic vehicles without crashing and to use them to try to take down rivals. Burnout Dominator is the only game without the crash mode from the previous games. Dominator mainly focuses on the original game's "Burnout", which is using up the entire boost meter non-stop and trying to chain boosts as long as possible.

Burnout Paradise added new features such as its open world gameplay where players could explore Paradise City at their leisure and race whenever they want once they get to race-starting areas called "intersections". It also introduced a feature called "mugshot" where, using the Xbox Live Vision camera or PlayStation Eye, it takes a "mugshot" of their opponent once the player took them down.

== Cars ==
Burnout originally featured a small collection of cars, including the small Compact, the Saloon (as well as a sports-modified GT version), the Pickup and the Muscle. This collection grew in Burnout 2 to include cars such as the Oval racer, the Cop Car, the Classic, The Gangster and the Hot Rod. Once Burnout 3: Takedown was released, the original cars were no longer used, except for the Custom Coupe Ultimate, a lime green Coupe that was one of the "Custom" cars in Burnout 2 (this car also reappears in Burnout Legends, Burnout Dominator, and Burnout Paradise). The Paradise version is called the Kitano Hydros Techno. The same happened in Burnout Revenge where the car collection was entirely new. For the most part, Burnout Paradise's car collection is all new but there are some vehicles (such as the aforementioned "Custom Coupe Ultimate" and the Custom Roadster from Burnout 2 or the Revenge Racer from Burnout Revenge) that are models from previous Burnout games. Paradise is also the first Burnout game to designate manufacturers and realistic car model names for its vehicles (such as the "Carson Annihilator" or "Nakamura Ikusa GT").

Another thing to note is how many of the cars could be based on their real-life counterparts, especially the vehicles from Burnout Revenge and Burnout Paradise. An example is the "Carson GT Concept" from Paradise, which resembles a fifth-generation Chevrolet Camaro.

Certain games in the series also have compatibility with other games, such as in Revenge, where players can unlock the Madden Challenge Bus by having a save file from Madden NFL 06, and a Burnout 3: Takedown save file unlocks the Dominator Assassin.

=== Car audio ===
Criterion prioritized compelling sound as key to the Burnout experience. Using the RenderWare Audio component, developers evolved the soundtrack over the years with each iteration of the game. The first Burnout used Fourier resynthesis for the engine sounds. Burnout 2 used a wavefolder with distortion and turbo/supercharger noises to add more realism. For the next game, the team began developing a granular playback system, which shipped with the Xbox 360 release of Burnout Revenge.

== Legacy ==
British studio When Tides Turn (Formerly Three Fields Entertainment), a company by the original founders of Criterion, developed the game Dangerous Driving, which is considered a spiritual successor to the series.
