= Burnout 2: Point of Impact =

2002 video game

- Developer: Criterion Games
- Publisher: Acclaim Entertainment
- Director: Alex Ward
- Designer: Chris Roberts
- Programmer: Richard Parr
- Artists: Michael Williamson; Trevor Moore; James Hans
- Composers: Steve Emney; Stephen Root
- Series: Burnout
- Engine: RenderWare
- Platforms: PlayStation 2, GameCube, Xbox
- Release: PlayStation 2: NA: 3 October 2002; AU: 10 October 2002; EU: 11 October 2002; GameCube, Xbox: NA: 8 April 2003 (GC); NA: 1 May 2003 (Xbox); EU: 9 May 2003; AU: 15 May 2003
- Genre: Racing
- Modes: Single-player, multiplayer

Burnout 2: Point of Impact is a 2002 racing video game developed by Criterion Games and published by Acclaim Entertainment for PlayStation 2, GameCube and Xbox. It is the sequel to the 2001 video game Burnout and the second title in the Burnout series. It was the last Burnout game to be released on the GameCube and the series would not see a release on a Nintendo platform until the release of Burnout Legends in 2005. The game also marked Acclaim's last entry in the Burnout series, as Acclaim would go bankrupt in 2004; the rest of the series would be published by Electronic Arts.

== Gameplay ==
The goal of Burnout 2: Point of Impact is to race circuits around a track, either alone, against the game artificial intelligence or human opponents. The tracks feature traffic, complex junctions and obstacles which can make driving at high speeds difficult. To travel faster, the player needs to accumulate Boost. This can be done by driving down the wrong side of the road, drifting around corners at high speeds, swerving to avoid traffic and hitting jumps at speed to gain air. Colliding with traffic or scenery at high speed causes the car to lose control and crash. After a short interval a replacement car then appears on the track without damage, but with a loss of boost.

The game also includes a "Crash" mode, in which the player(s) earn points by causing damage to other vehicles. Crash mode is generally seen as the "puzzle" aspect of Burnout, as each scenario's vehicles are not randomised. This adds a layer of strategy, as well as trial and error, to determine which angle, speed, and point of impact is required to obtain maximum points. The points are given in cash (dollars).

There is also a Pursuit mode where the player takes the role of a cop and must wreck an escaping criminal's car to arrest him, thereby unlocking the car.

The Xbox version of the game is subtitled the "Developer's Cut" and features 21 new car skins, 15 more "crash" mode tracks, which totals up to 30 "crash" mode tracks in all and an Xbox Live online leaderboard, which was also the first use of Xbox Live in a Burnout game. The GameCube version of the game also includes the 15 additional crash mode tracks.

The GameCube and PlayStation 2 versions include all the custom cars from the Xbox version, but they do not have customisable liveries, online functions, or custom soundtrack capabilities.

== Promotion ==
To promote the game, Acclaim Entertainment offered to reimburse any driver in the United Kingdom who received a speeding ticket. Following a negative reaction to this from the UK government, the plan was cancelled.

== Reception ==
Reception

Aggregate score
Aggregator	Score		
Aggregator	GameCube	PS2	Xbox
Metacritic	89/100	86/100	88/100

Review scores
Publication	Score		
Publication	GameCube	PS2	Xbox
Edge	N/A	8/10	N/A
Electronic Gaming Monthly	8/10	8.33/10	8.17/10
Eurogamer	N/A	9/10	8/10
Famitsu	N/A	30/40	N/A
Game Informer	8.5/10	8/10	8.5/10
GamePro	4.5/5	4.5/5	4.5/5
GameSpot	8.5/10	8.3/10	8.6/10
GameSpy	4.5/5	4.5/5	4.5/5
GameZone	9/10	8.5/10	9.3/10
IGN	8.5/10	9/10	8.6/10
Nintendo Power	4.5/5	N/A	N/A
Official U.S. PlayStation Magazine	N/A	4/5	N/A
Official Xbox Magazine (US)	N/A	N/A	9/10
Entertainment Weekly	A	A	A

Burnout 2: Point of Impact received "favourable" reviews on all platforms according to video game review aggregator website Metacritic.

GameSpot called the PS2 version of the game a "must-own" title for arcade racing fans due to its inclusion of single-player and multiplayer modes. The publication also named it the best Xbox game of April 2003. Commenting the PS2 version, GameSpy said that "if Gran Turismo 3 is Dom Perignon, Burnout 2 is Jack Daniels", more preferring the latter. IGN called the same version "an excellent sequel", praising the graphics, the sense of speed, and modes of play, particularly the Crash mode. Eurogamer's Kristan Reed said the game was worth playing whether the players liked the first game or not. Reed thought the multiplayer mode was a little disappointing, with a lower frame rate than other parts of the game, but was otherwise highly complimentary:

"Burnout 2 is the most compelling arcade driving experience we have ever had the pleasure of undertaking. It's a visual master class, supremely playable, addictive, has huge replayability and has a superb learning curve that will ensure it has a broad appeal to anyone with even a vague interest in videogames. There really is no excuse not to buy this – it will restore your faith in the ability of videogames to generate excitement. Burnout 2 is pure adrenaline. You owe it to yourself to play this game".

During the AIAS' 7th Annual Interactive Achievement Awards, Burnout 2 received a nomination for "Console Racing Game of the Year". Edge magazine ranked the game 75th on their 100 Best Video Games in 2007.
