= Burnout Crash! =

2011 video game

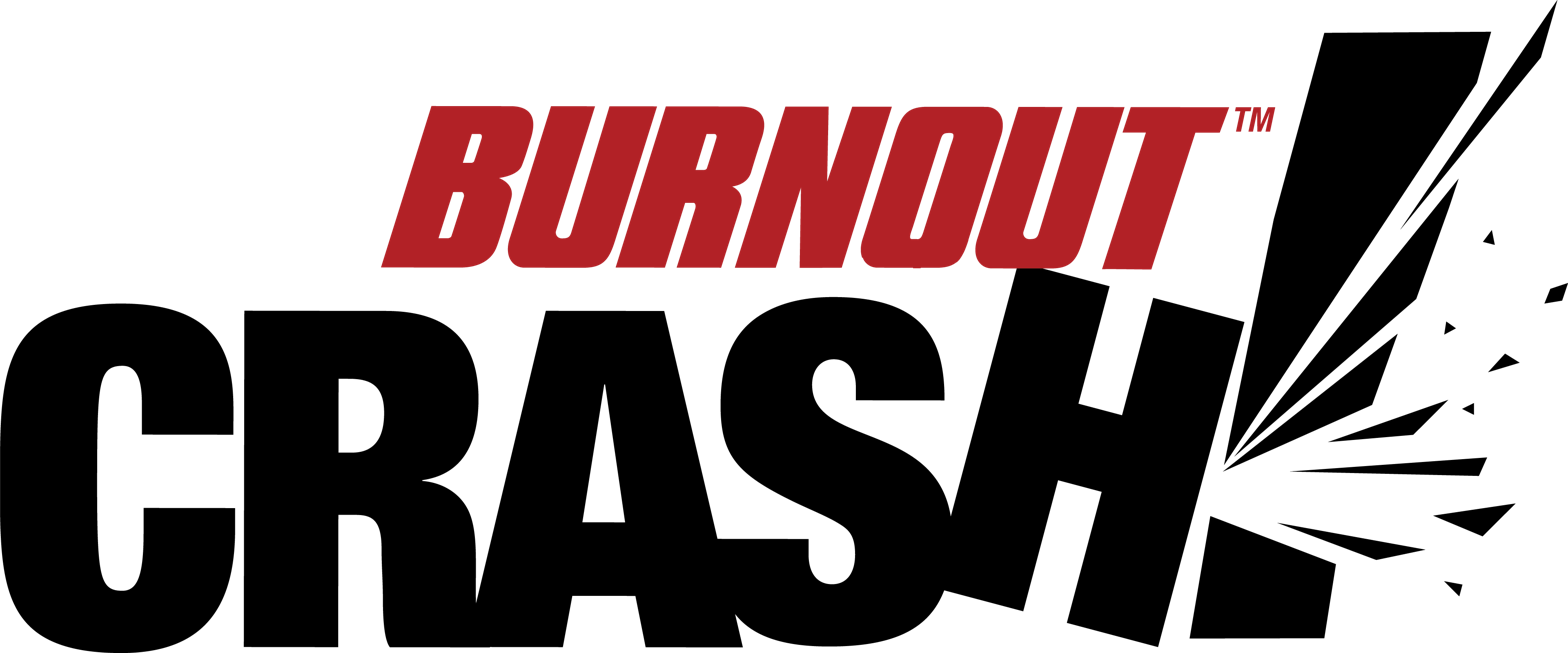
- Developer: Criterion Games
- Publisher: Electronic Arts
- Directors: Rich Franke; Toby Nelson
- Producers: Dan McDonald; Thomas Belmont
- Designer: Bill Lane
- Series: Burnout
- Platforms: PlayStation 3, Xbox 360, iOS
- Release: NA: 20 September 2011 (PSN); NA: 21 September 2011 (XBLA); EU: 21 September 2011; NA: 15 April 2012 (iOS)
- Genre: Racing
- Mode: Single-player

Burnout Crash! (branded Burnout CRASH!) is a downloadable action racing video game in the Burnout series. It is developed by Criterion Games and published by Electronic Arts for PlayStation 3, Xbox 360, iOS via PlayStation Network, Xbox Live Arcade, and iTunes App Store.

In Burnout Crash!, players drive into an intersection and attempt to cause as big a pile-up as possible. Unlike previous games in the series, Burnout Crash! is played from a bird's-eye or aerial view. Points are earned for causing damage and destroying the environment and other vehicles. Leaderboards powered by EA's Autolog service enable players to compare scores with other players.

The game features three game modes and six different intersections to play, as well as seven drivable vehicles. The Xbox 360 version of the game also includes a Kinect mode, allowing players to use gestures to control the game.

To date, Burnout Crash! was the last title in the series before much of Criterion's staff transitioned over to working on the Need for Speed series, while the remaining staff provide additional work on non-racing game titles.

== Reception ==
Reception (PlayStation 3 / Xbox 360)

Aggregate score
Aggregator	Score
Metacritic	PS3: 69/100; X360: 66/100

Review scores
Publication	Score
Destructoid	8/10
Eurogamer	6/10
Game Informer	7.5/10
GameRevolution	C+
GameSpot	7/10
GameTrailers	7.1/10
Giant Bomb	3/5
IGN	7.5/10
Joystiq	3/5
Official Xbox Magazine (US)	7.5/10
PlayStation: The Official Magazine	6/10
411Mania	6.8/10
Metro	5/10

Reception (iOS)

Aggregate score
Aggregator	Score
Metacritic	77/100

Review scores
Publication	Score
Gamezebo	3.5/5
Pocket Gamer	3/5
TouchArcade	4/5

The iOS version received "favorable" reviews, while the PlayStation 3 and Xbox 360 versions received "average" reviews according to video game review aggregator website Metacritic. GamePro gave the PlayStation 3 and Xbox 360 versions three-and-a-half stars out of five. Although calling it "addictive", they said that the game doesn't have the same "mindless" carnage from the previous titles. The A.V. Club gave the Xbox 360 version a C, criticizing the gameplay's execution and its soundtrack. Edge gave the same Xbox 360 version a score of four out of ten. The magazine criticized the changes in gameplay (such as a top-down perspective, a lack of Crash mode and a system of unlocking new vehicles), the usage of Kinect system due to its imprecise controls, and the game's price.
