= Criterion Games =

British video game developer

- Formerly: Criterion Studios
- Type: Subsidiary
- Industry: Video games
- Predecessor: Criterion Software (games division)
- Founded: January 1996; 30 years ago
- Headquarters: Guildford, England
- Products: Burnout series; Need for Speed series; Black
- Number of employees: ≈90 (2017)
- Parent: Canon Inc. (1996–2004); Electronic Arts (2004–present)
- Subsidiaries: Criterion Cheshire
- Website: ea.com/ea-studios/criterion-games

Criterion Games is a British video game developer based in Guildford. Founded in January 1996 as a division of Criterion Software, it was owned by Canon Inc. until Criterion Software was sold to Electronic Arts in October 2004. Many of the studio's titles were built on the RenderWare engine, which Criterion Software developed.

Notable games developed by Criterion include entries in the Burnout and Need for Speed series of racing games. As of April 2017, Criterion Games employ approximately 90 people.

== History ==
=== Background and foundation (1993–1996) ===
David Lau-Kee, the founder and leader of Canon Inc.'s European research arm, established Criterion Software as a wholly owned subsidiary of Canon in December 1993 and assumed the managing director role for it. At the time, Canon was seeking to establish a multimedia tool development business, while Lau-Kee had been working on interactive 2D image processing techniques and was looking to extend this to 3D image processing and, in turn, "out-and-out" 3D graphics. Adam Billyard, who served as its chief technology officer, is also credited as a co-founder.

Criterion Software's 3D texture mapping and rendering programme, RenderWare, was first released in 1993 as a software library for the C programming language and was adopted by 800 companies worldwide by October 1996. The firm also provided a demo game, CyberStreet, while fully-fledged games were developed by companies like 47Tek. Meanwhile, competitor Argonaut Software developed full games—including FX Fighter and Alien Odyssey–to showcase its BRender technology. In response, Criterion Software hired new staff in 1995 to establish a dedicated game development division. To support this expansion, Criterion Software moved to new offices within Guildford in late 1995. The division, Criterion Studios, was established in January 1996 and announced the month thereafter, at the time employing 25 people. The headcount expanded to around 35 by October.

RenderWare was thereafter gradually retooled as a game development programme, with its third iteration, released in 2000, first providing full game engine capabilities. The first game to use this version was Burnout, which Criterion Studios developed in tandem. Publishing rights to the game were sold to Acclaim Entertainment, while Criterion Studios retained the intellectual property to the brand and technology. Acclaim published Burnout (2000) and its sequel, Burnout 2: Point of Impact (2002), which accumulated around 2 million sales. Despite this, Acclaim lacked the resources to market them in the United States, its home territory, leading to poor sales in the country. At the same time, Criterion Studios (now named Criterion Games) was frequently approached by Electronic Arts (EA), which eventually signed with Criterion Games for the third release in the series, Burnout 3: Takedown (2004).

=== Sale to Electronic Arts (2004–2014) ===
In July 2004, EA announced that it had reached an agreement with Canon's European arm, Canon Europe, to acquire all of the Criterion Software group, including Criterion Games. The deal was finalised on 19 October 2004, with EA paying US$68 million. After the purchase, both Criterion and Electronic Arts declared that RenderWare would continue to be made available to third-party customers. However, some clients decided it was too risky to rely on technology owned by a competitor. Electronic Arts has since withdrawn RenderWare from the commercial middleware market, although remnants are still used by internal developers. In mid-2006, the company closed its Derby satellite office, making all of its programmers and support staff redundant.

In early March 2007, Electronic Arts combined its Chertsey-based UK development studio and Criterion Games into a new building in central Guildford. Integration of the teams did not occur and the location housed two very separate development studios: Criterion Games and EA Bright Light before Bright Light was shut permanently in 2011. In November 2007, co-founder and CEO David Lau-Kee made the decision to leave Electronic Arts to concentrate on advisory activities within the games industry. Adam Billyard also left Electronic Arts as CTO of EATech in 2007 to pursue other projects.

On 14 June 2010, Criterion announced that Need for Speed: Hot Pursuit was set for release in November 2010. The software utilises a new game engine named Chameleon. On 1 June 2012, Electronic Arts announced Criterion's second Need for Speed title, Need for Speed: Most Wanted, which was released on 30 October 2012. At Electronic Entertainment Expo 2012, Criterion Games announced that it had taken sole ownership of the Need for Speed franchise.

On 28 April 2013, Alex Ward announced via Twitter that the studio is planning to steer away from its tradition of developing racing games and is instead focusing on other genres for future projects. On 13 September 2013, Criterion elected to cut its staff numbers to 17 people total, as 80% (70 people) of the studio moved over to Ghost Games UK to work with Need for Speed games.

=== Expanding to other genres (2014–2023) ===
On 3 January 2014, Alex Ward and Fiona Sperry left Criterion and founded a new studio, Three Fields Entertainment. At the Electronic Entertainment Expo 2014, the company announced a new racing project. However, the project was cancelled as Criterion is now focusing on providing additional support to other EA studios in creating future Star Wars games. Criterion worked on Star Wars Battlefront: X-Wing VR Mission, a new virtual reality mission for Star Wars Battlefront; the company would return to do additional work for the 2017 sequel.

In June 2015, news site Nintendo Life revealed that in early 2011 Nintendo of Europe approached Criterion to work on a pitch for a new F-Zero game which it hoped to unveil at E3 that same year alongside the then-unreleased Wii U console, and potentially release the game during the console's launch period. However, the developer was unable to handle the pitch as, at the time, it devoted much of its resources into the development of Need for Speed: Most Wanted for multiple platforms. The site was tipped by an anonymous, yet "reliable" source, but they had confirmed this information when Criterion co-founder Alex Ward (who left the company in 2014) admitted that Nintendo of Europe did indeed approach the company for a potential F-Zero game on the Wii U. Alex Ward also noted on Twitter that Criterion was also offered the opportunity to work on the first Forza, Mad Max, a Vauxhall only racer, a Command & Conquer first-person shooter and a Gone in 60 Seconds game.

In 2018, EA announced that Battlefield V would have a battle royale mode and would be developed by Criterion. Following the release of the mode (later revealed to be called Firestorm), development was halted soon after with the mode considered a failure by fans. In 2020, Criterion was announced to return as the main developer of the Need for Speed series, but work on the title was put on hold as Criterion was assigned to do additional work, including vehicular gameplay, on the next Battlefield game in March 2021. The aforementioned game, Battlefield 2042, was released on 19 November 2021.

In May 2022, EA merged Codemasters subsidiary Codemasters Cheshire (the successor studio of Evolution Studios) into Criterion Games to support efforts on the Need for Speed series as the two companies were already working together on a new title in the series for months. On 6 October 2022, the project was revealed to be Need for Speed Unbound, which utilises DICE's proprietary Frostbite engine. Unbound was released on 2 December 2022, following which five senior members of Criterion announced their departures from the studio, including the current studio GM, Matt Webster. They created Fuse Games in 2023

=== Focus on Battlefield (2023–present) ===
While Criterion was originally placed within EA Sports following EA's restructuring in early 2023, EA moved Criterion into EA Entertainment in September 2023 as to support the development of the Battlefield series. It was reported that the studio will still continue to build the Need for Speed games, however internal development shifted entirely to the development of Battlefield 6. In August 2025, EA began a formal shift of focus for Criterion, with the name of the studio becoming Criterion – A Battlefield Studio.

== Legacy ==
Three Fields Entertainment, a company founded by Alex Ward and Fiona Sperry, released their first game Dangerous Golf in May 2016, combined ideas from Burnout and Black and is to lead them through a spiritual successor to Burnout. Matt Webster, former VP and GM, co-founded Fuse Games in 2023.

== Accolades ==
GamesIndustry.biz named Criterion Games among the "best places to work in the UK video games industry" in the Best Mid-sized Companies category every year from 2017 to 2022 and awarded them The Health & Wellbeing Award in 2021.

== Games developed ==
Year	Title	Platform(s)	Publisher(s)	Notes
1996	Scorched Planet	Microsoft Windows	Virgin Interactive	—N/a
1997	Speedboat Attack	Microsoft Windows	Telstar Electronic Studios	—N/a
1997	Sub Culture	Microsoft Windows	Ubisoft	—N/a
1998	Redline Racer	Dreamcast, Microsoft Windows	Ubisoft	—N/a
1999	TrickStyle	Dreamcast, Microsoft Windows	Acclaim Entertainment	—N/a
2000	Deep Fighter	Dreamcast, Microsoft Windows	Ubisoft	—N/a
2001	AirBlade	PlayStation 2	SCEE (Europe); Namco (North America)	—N/a
2001	Burnout	GameCube, PlayStation 2, Xbox	Acclaim Entertainment	—N/a
2002	Burnout 2: Point of Impact	GameCube, PlayStation 2, Xbox	Acclaim Entertainment	—N/a
2004	Burnout 3: Takedown	PlayStation 2, Xbox	Electronic Arts	—N/a
2005	Burnout Legends	PlayStation Portable, Nintendo DS	Electronic Arts	Ported to Nintendo DS by Visual Impact
2005	Burnout Revenge	PlayStation 2, Xbox, Xbox 360	Electronic Arts	—N/a
2006	Black	PlayStation 2, Xbox	Electronic Arts	—N/a
2008	Burnout Paradise	Microsoft Windows, PlayStation 3, Xbox 360	Electronic Arts	—N/a
2010	Need for Speed: Hot Pursuit	Microsoft Windows, PlayStation 3, Xbox 360, Wii	Electronic Arts	Assisted by DICE; Wii version developed by Exient Entertainment
2011	Burnout Crash!	iOS, PlayStation 3, Xbox 360	Electronic Arts	—N/a
2012	Need for Speed: Most Wanted	Microsoft Windows, PlayStation 3, PlayStation Vita, Wii U, Xbox 360	Electronic Arts	—N/a
2013	Need for Speed Rivals	Microsoft Windows, PlayStation 3, PlayStation 4, Xbox 360, Xbox One	Electronic Arts	In collaboration with Ghost Games
2015	Need for Speed	Microsoft Windows, PlayStation 4, Xbox One	Electronic Arts	Additional work
2015	Star Wars Battlefront	Microsoft Windows, PlayStation 4, Xbox One	Electronic Arts	Additional work
2016	Battlefield 1	Microsoft Windows, PlayStation 4, Xbox One	Electronic Arts	Additional work
2016	Star Wars Battlefront Rogue One: X-Wing VR Mission	PlayStation 4	Electronic Arts	—N/a
2017	Star Wars Battlefront II	Microsoft Windows, PlayStation 4, Xbox One	Electronic Arts	Additional work
2018	Battlefield V	Microsoft Windows, PlayStation 4, Xbox One	Electronic Arts	Developed the Firestorm mode
2019	Need for Speed Heat	Microsoft Windows, PlayStation 4, Xbox One	Electronic Arts	Took over post-launch development from Ghost Games in February 2020
2021	Battlefield 2042	Microsoft Windows, PlayStation 4, PlayStation 5, Xbox One, Xbox Series X/S	Electronic Arts	Additional work
2022	Need for Speed Unbound	Microsoft Windows, PlayStation 5, Xbox Series X/S	Electronic Arts	—N/a
2025	Battlefield 6	Microsoft Windows, PlayStation 5, Xbox Series X/S	Electronic Arts	Developed as part of Battlefield Studios (Note: Battlefield Studios is a development team consisting of DICE, Ripple Effect Studios, Motive Studio and Criterion.)
