= RenderWare =

Video game engine

- Developer: Criterion Games
- Release: 1993
- Written in: C
- Operating system: MS-DOS; Windows; Dreamcast; PlayStation 2; Mac OS X; GameCube; Xbox; PlayStation Portable; Xbox 360; PlayStation 3; Wii; iOS; Android; PlayStation 4; Xbox One
- License: Proprietary
- Website: renderware.com (archived)

RenderWare is a 3D rendering engine developed by the British game developer Criterion Games. It is cross-platform, allowing for the creation of games that work with Windows, Mac OS X, and many video game consoles of the time, until the 8th generation.

== Overview ==
Released in 1993, RenderWare was a 3D API and graphics rendering engine used in video games, WorldsPlayer, Active Worlds, and some VRML browsers. RenderWare was developed by Criterion Games, then a subsidiary of Canon. It originated in the era of software rendering on CPUs prior to the appearance of GPUs, competing with other libraries such as Argonaut Games's BRender and RenderMorphics' Reality Lab (the latter was acquired by Microsoft and became Direct3DRM). RenderWare's principal commercial importance was in providing an off-the-shelf solution to the difficulties of PS2 graphics programming. As such, the engine was often described as "Sony's DirectX" during its peak in adoption.

RenderWare was licensed over 200 times, including Rockstar Games' Grand Theft Auto III (2001) and its sequels Vice City (2002) and San Andreas (2004). The scope went towards an integrated middleware with low-level APIs for rendering, physics, audio, and AI, all of which are extensible through plug-ins which also serve the official high-level API. The aim was to reduce the learning curve by also including service and support for licensees. With RenderWare Studio, an integrated development environment including a debugger was included. RenderWare also had its own scripting language, .RWX, for constructing 3D meshes until RenderWare 3. All versions going forward focused on newer binary model file formats.

In May 2002, Criterion Games wanted to acquire MathEngine PLC, a UK-based studio based in London. The studio eventually integrated the Karma physics engine from MathEngine into RenderWare (also utilized in Unreal Engine 2) for real-time physics interactions, collisions, and ragdoll physics in their games. RenderWare themselves claimed a 70% marketshare across studios that choose an external engine in 2003. Renderware 4 was later revealed at GDC 2004.

RenderWare is no longer available for purchase, although Electronic Arts (EA) still honors old contracts, meaning that external developers who licensed the technology before the Criterion acquisition may still use the software. What was RenderWare 4 has dissolved into the rest of EA internal tech. During a 2007 Gamasutra interview, Bing Gordon, EA CCO, stated that RenderWare did not graphically perform well enough for next-gen hardware, and that it no longer stood up to its competition, namely Epic Games' Unreal Engine. He also said at the time that the RenderWare team was "mostly a dev house".

== See also ==
- Category:RenderWare games
