= List of delisted video games =

Video game list

This is a list of notable video games that have been digitally delisted from distribution platforms such as Battle.net, Epic Games Store, GOG.com, Meta Horizon Store, Nintendo eShop, PlayStation Store, Steam, Ubisoft Connect, and Xbox Games Store.

This list only includes titles which have been delisted from all digital platforms. Shovelware, asset flip, and mobile-only video games are not included in this list.

== Background ==
Video game titles have been delisted for a variety of reasons, but are commonly pulled due to expiring copyright licenses. Some games received a physical disc or cartridge release prior to their digital delisting, allowing them to continue to be played in a legal manner. Other titles which did not receive physical releases can frequently only be obtained through digital piracy. Games requiring a constant internet connection typically become unplayable after delisting even if the core game is single-player.

The digital delisting of games has led to the Stop Killing Games movement, as well as proposed legislation in California and Brazil to address the issue.

== Currently delisted ==
This list is limited to titles which have been digitally delisted from every digital gaming storefront. For example, Overlord: Fellowship of Evil is not included; while the title has been delisted from PlayStation Store and Xbox Games Store, it remains available on Steam.

=== Multiplayer-only ===
All games listed below are online multiplayer-only titles; any multiplayer game which possesses at least one single-player element is included in the single-player list.

Title	Release year	Physical release	Internet required	Notes
Anthem	2019	Yes	Yes	
Battlefield 1943	2009	No	Yes	
City of Heroes	2004	Yes	Yes	
Club Penguin	2005	Yes (Note: Never publicly released, very limited quantity in existence.)	Yes	
Concord	2024	Yes	Yes	
The Day Before	2023	No	Yes	
Marvel Heroes	2013	No	Yes	
Paragon	2018	Yes	Yes	
Rusty Hearts	2011	No	Yes	
Tom Clancy's EndWar Online	2013	No	Yes	
XDefiant	2024	No	Yes	

=== Single-player ===
All games listed below possess at least one single-player element; some single-player games require constant internet connectivity to play (such as The Crew); these titles are signified below.

Title	Release year	Physical release	Internet required	Notes
007 Legends	2012	Yes	No	
007: Quantum of Solace	2008	Yes	No	
The 3rd Birthday	2010	Yes	No	
50 Cent: Blood on the Sand	2009	Yes	No	
Ace Combat: Assault Horizon	2011	Yes	No	
Ace Combat Infinity	2014	No	No	
Ace Combat: Joint Assault	2010	Yes	No	
Ace Combat 5: The Unsung War	2004	Yes	No	
Ace Combat 6: Fires of Liberation	2007	Yes	No	
Afro Samurai 2	2015	No	No	
Age of Booty	2008	No	No	
All Zombies Must Die!	2011	No	No	
The Amazing Spider-Man	2012	Yes	No	
The Amazing Spider-Man 2	2014	Yes	No	
Angry Birds Trilogy	2012	Yes	No	
Assassin's Creed III	2012	Yes	No	Succeeded by Assassin's Creed III Remastered.
Avatar: The Game	2009	Yes	No	
Babylon's Fall	2022	Yes	Yes	
Back to the Future: The Game	2010-2011	Yes	No	
Battlefield 2: Modern Combat	2005	Yes	No	
Battlefield: Bad Company	2008	Yes	No	
Battlefield: Bad Company 2	2010	Yes	No	
Battlefield 2142	2006	Yes	Unknown	
Blazing Angels: Squadrons of WWII	2006	Yes	No	
Boom Boom Rocket	2007	Yes (Note: Exclusively through the Xbox Live Arcade Compilation Disc.)	No	(Note: Delisted in July 2026.)
Burnout Paradise	2008	Yes	No	Succeeded by Burnout Paradise Remastered.
Cabela's Alaskan Adventures	2006	Yes	No	
Cars 3: Driven to Win	2017	Yes	No	
The Chronicles of Riddick: Assault on Dark Athena	2009	Yes	No	
Colin McRae: Dirt	2007	Yes	No	
Colin McRae Rally	2013	No	No	
Cooking Mama: Cookstar	2020	Yes	No	(Note: In 2022, the International Court of Arbitration ruled that the game violated trademark law, leading to digital delisting of the game.)
The Crew	2014	Yes	Yes	(Note: Unplayable due to its always-online nature, despite being mostly single-player. A fan revival project is available.)
Condemned: Criminal Origins	2005	Yes	No	
Darkstalkers Resurrection	2013	Yes (Note: Japan-only)	No	
Days of Thunder	2011	Yes	No	
Deadpool	2013	Yes	No	(Note: Deadpool was delisted from digital stores in 2014, and re-released in 2015, before being delisted again in 2017.)
Dead or Alive 6	2019	Yes	No	Succeeded by Dead or Alive 6 Last Round. (Note: The Steam version of Dead or Alive 6 was delisted on June 10, 2026.)
Destruction AllStars	2021	Yes	No	
Dirt 2	2009	Yes	No	
Dirt 3	2011	Yes	No	
Dirt 4	2017	Yes	No	
Dirt Rally	2015	Yes	No	
Dirt: Showdown	2012	Yes	No	
Driveclub	2014	Yes	No	
Driver: San Francisco	2011	Yes	No	
Duck Dynasty	2014	Yes	No	
EA Sports UFC	2014	Yes	No	
EA Sports UFC 2	2016	Yes	No	
EA Sports UFC 3	2018	Yes	No	
Earthworm Jim HD	2010	No	No	
Enchanted Arms	2006	Yes	No	
F1 2010	2010	Yes	No	
F1 2011	2011	Yes	No	
F1 2012	2012	Yes	No	
F1 2013	2013	Yes	No	
F1 2014	2014	Yes	No	
F1 2015	2015	Yes	No	
F1 2016	2016	Yes	No	
F1 2017	2017	Yes	No	
F1 2018	2018	Yes	No	
F1 2019	2019	Yes	No	
F1 2020	2020	Yes	No	
F1 2021	2021	Yes	No	
F1 22	2022	Yes	No	
Falling Skies: The Game	2014	Yes	No	
Family Guy: Back to the Multiverse	2012	Yes	No	
Fantavision 202X	2023	Yes	No	
Fast & Furious Crossroads	2020	Yes	No	
Fast & Furious: Showdown	2013	Yes	No	
Fat Princess	2009	Yes	No	
Fire Emblem Fates	2015	Yes	No	(Note: Delisted on February 28, 2023, one month before the closure of the Nintendo 3DS eShop. The game's additional story paths (which were delisted upon the eShop's closure) were only purchasable after reaching Chapter 6 in the main story, therefore the delisting gave those who'd bought the game enough time to reach said chapter and purchase the paths.)
Fitness Boxing	2018	Yes	No	
Fitness Boxing 2: Rhythm & Exercise	2020	Yes	No	
Forza Horizon	2012	Yes	No	(Note: Online services shutdown August 2023)
Forza Horizon 2	2014	Yes	No	(Note: Online services shutdown August 2023)
Forza Horizon 2: Presents Fast & Furious	2015	No	No	
Forza Horizon 3	2016	Yes	No	
Forza Horizon 4	2018	Yes	No	
Forza Motorsport 5	2013	Yes	No	
Forza Motorsport 6	2015	Yes	No	
Forza Motorsport 7	2017	Yes	No	
Friday the 13th: Killer Puzzle	2018	No	No	(Note: Delisted on January 13, 2023.)
Friday the 13th: The Game	2017	Yes	No	(Note: Delisted on December 31, 2023, with the online servers shutting down on December 31, 2024. Offline modes remain available.)
Fuel	2009	Yes	No	
Game of Thrones	2012	Yes	No	
Game of Thrones - A Telltale Games Series	2014	Yes	No	
Ghostbusters	2016	Yes	No	
God Mode	2013	No	No	
Godzilla	2014	Yes	No	
GoldenEye 007: Reloaded	2011	Yes	No	
The Golf Club	2014	Yes	No	
The Golf Club 2	2017	Yes	No	
Gran Turismo 6	2013	Yes	No	
Gran Turismo Sport	2017	Yes	Mixed (Note: No offline progression)	
Grand Theft Auto	1997	Yes	No	
Grand Theft Auto 2	1999	Yes	No	
Grand Theft Auto III	2001	Yes	No	Succeeded by Grand Theft Auto: The Trilogy – The Definitive Edition. (Note: The new release received negative reviews and was generally considered inferior to the original versions.)
Grand Theft Auto: San Andreas	2004	Yes	No	Succeeded by Grand Theft Auto: The Trilogy – The Definitive Edition.
Grand Theft Auto: Vice City	2002	Yes	No	Succeeded by Grand Theft Auto: The Trilogy – The Definitive Edition.
Grand Theft Auto: Vice City Stories	2006	Yes	No	
Grid 2	2013	Yes	No	
Guardians of the Galaxy: The Telltale Series	2017	Yes	No	
Hasbro Family Game Night	2008	Yes	No	
James Bond 007: Blood Stone	2010	Yes	No	
John Wick Hex	2019	Yes	No	
Jump Force	2019	Yes	No	
Jurassic Park: The Game	2011	Yes	No	
Just Dance 2017	2016	Yes	No	
Kung Fu Panda: Showdown of Legendary Legends	2015	Yes	No	
The Legend of Korra	2014	No	No	
Lego 2K Drive	2023	Yes	No	(Note: Was delisted on May 19, 2026, with all online services set to be discontinued on May 31, 2027. Offline modes are present in-game.)
Lego City Undercover: The Chase Begins	2013	Yes	No	(Note: Delisted from the Nintendo eShop on December 22, 2020, alongside the Wii U version of Lego City Undercover.)
Lego Rock Band	2009	Yes	No	
LittleBigPlanet 3	2014	Yes	No	
London 2012	2012	Yes	No	
The Lord of the Rings: War in the North	2011	Yes	No	Succeeded by The Lord of the Rings: War in the North - Legacy Edition
Lost: Via Domus	2008	Yes	No	
Madagascar 3: The Video Game	2012	Yes	No	
Manhunt 2	2007	Yes (Note: The M-rated version of the game is physically available on consoles, the AO-rated version of the game released on PC is not (and is only available through digital piracy).)	No	
Mark McMorris Infinite Air	2016	Yes	No	
Marvel Avengers: Battle for Earth	2012	Yes	No	
Marvel's Avengers	2020	Yes	Mixed (Note: Internet required to download a day-one patch on the PS4 and Xbox One discs; patch not required to play the PS5 disc release.)	
Marvel: Ultimate Alliance	2006	Yes	No	
Marvel: Ultimate Alliance 2	2009	Yes	No	
Mario & Sonic at the Olympic Games Tokyo 2020	2019	Yes	No	(Note: Delisted on March 31, 2026.)
Mario & Sonic at the Rio 2016 Olympic Games	2016	Yes	No	(Note: Delisted on December 26, 2017.)
Mario & Sonic at the Sochi 2014 Olympic Winter Games	2013	Yes	No	
The Matrix Awakens	2021	No	Yes	
Meme Run	2014	No	No	(Note: Delisted on March 3, 2015 due to unauthorised usage of the "trollface" meme.)
Metal Gear Solid HD Collection	2011	Yes	No	Succeeded by Metal Gear Solid: Master Collection.
Metal Max Xeno	2018	Yes	No	
Midnight Club II	2003	Yes	No	
Minecraft: Story Mode	2015	Yes	No	
Minecraft: Story Mode - Season Two	2017	Yes	No	
Mortal Kombat	2011	Yes	No	
Mortal Kombat vs. DC Universe	2008	Yes	No	
MultiVersus	2024	No	No	
Naughty Bear	2010	Yes	No	
Need for Speed: Most Wanted	2005	Yes	No	
Need for Speed: Carbon	2006	Yes	No	
Need for Speed: ProStreet	2007	Yes	No	
Need for Speed: Undercover	2008	Yes	No	
Need for Speed: Shift	2009	Yes	No	
Need for Speed: Hot Pursuit	2010	Yes	No	Succeeded by Need for Speed: Hot Pursuit Remastered
Need for Speed: The Run	2011	Yes	No	
Nerf Legends	2021	Yes	No	
Onrush	2018	Yes	No	
P.T.	2014	No	No	
PAC-MAN 99	2021	No	No	(Note: Exclusively available via a Nintendo Switch Online membership. Offline modes remain available if they were purchased prior to the game's delisting in October 2023.)
Pac-Man and the Ghostly Adventures	2013	Yes	No	(Note: Delisted in July 2020.)
Pac-Man and the Ghostly Adventures 2	2014	Yes	No	(Note: Delisted in July 2020.)
Pac-Man Museum	2014	No	No	(Note: Delisted in July 2020.)
Pacific Rim	2013	No	No	
Paranormal Activity: The Lost Soul	2017	Yes	No	
Peter Jackson's King Kong	2005	Yes	No	
Project CARS	2015	Yes	No	
Project CARS 2	2017	Yes	No	
Project CARS 3	2020	Yes	No	
Project Spark	2014	Yes	No	
Pure	2008	Yes	No	
Rambo: The Video Game	2014	Yes	No	
Rock Band 3	2011	Yes	No	
Rock Band 4	2015	Yes	No	(Note: Digitally delisted due to expiring music licenses.)
Saw	2009	Yes	No	
Saw II: Flesh & Blood	2010	Yes	No	
Sega Genesis Classics	2010-2018	Yes	No	(Note: All the volumes on PC and the console release were delisted on December 6, 2024.)
Shaun White Snowboarding	2008	Yes	No	
Shift 2: Unleashed	2011	Yes	No	
Silent Hill: Downpour	2012	Yes	No	
Silent Hill: Shattered Memories	2010	Yes	No	
Skate 2	2009	Yes	No	
Sonic Generations	2011	Yes	No	(Note: Removed from Steam and the Xbox Store as a standalone title on September 9, 2024. It remains available on Steam via bundles that contain multiple Sonic games, likely due to the game's active modding community. Said mods remained unaffected.)
Soulcalibur II HD Online	2013	No	No	
SoulCalibur IV	2008	Yes	No	
Soulcalibur V	2012	Yes	No	
Soulcalibur: Lost Swords	2014	No	Yes	
Spartacus Legends	2013	No	Unknown	
Spec Ops: The Line	2012	Yes	No	
Spider-Man: Edge of Time	2011	Yes	No	
Spider-Man: Shattered Dimensions	2010	Yes	No	
Spider-Man 3	2007	Yes	No	
Stalin vs. Martians	2009	No	No	
Star Trek	2013	Yes	No	
Star Trek: Bridge Crew	2017	Yes	No	
Star Trek: Resurgence	2023	Yes	No	
Star Wars: The Clone Wars – Republic Heroes	2009	Yes	No	
Street Fighter V	2016	Yes	No	
Strong Bad's Cool Game for Attractive People	2008	No	No	(Note: Initially delisted in 2019 due to the closure of Telltale Games. Was relisted on Steam in December 2020 but was then delisted again in 2023 due to expired licensing.)
Super Mario 3D All-Stars	2020	Yes	No	(Note: The delisting date was announced alongside the game's reveal.)
Super Mario Maker	2015	Yes	No	(Note: Delisted on January 13, 2021, ahead of course upload support being discontinued on March 31, 2021.)
Teenage Mutant Ninja Turtles: Mutants in Manhattan	2016	Yes	No	
Teenage Mutant Ninja Turtles: Turtles in Time Re-Shelled	2009	No	No	
Tekken Revolution	2013	No	Yes	
Tom Clancy's H.A.W.X	2009	Yes	No	
Tom Clancy's H.A.W.X 2	2010	Yes	No	
Tony Hawk's Pro Skater 5	2015	Yes	Mixed	
Tony Hawk's Pro Skater HD	2012	No	No	
Top Gun	2010	Yes	No	
Tornado Outbreak	2009	Yes	No	(Note: Delisted on July 29, 2024.)
Transformers: Dark of the Moon	2011	Yes	No	
Transformers: Devastation	2015	Yes	No	
Transformers: Fall of Cybertron	2012	Yes	No	
Transformers: Revenge of the Fallen	2009	Yes	No	
Transformers: Rise of the Dark Spark	2014	Yes	No	
Transformers: The Game	2007	Yes	No	
Transformers: War for Cybertron	2010	Yes	No	
Unreal Tournament	1999	Yes	No	
The Vanishing of Ethan Carter VR	2016	No	No	
WBSC eBaseball: Power Pros	2023	No	No	(Note: Delisted on January 30, 2026. Online servers were later shut down on March 31, 2026.)
World Gone Sour	2011	No	No	
WWE 2K14	2013	Yes	No	
WWE 2K15	2014	Yes	No	
WWE 2K16	2015	Yes	No	
WWE 2K17	2016	Yes	No	
WWE 2K18	2017	Yes	No	
WWE 2K19	2018	Yes	No	
WWE 2K20	2019	Yes	No	
WWE 2K22	2022	Yes	No	
WWE 2K23	2023	Yes	No	
WWE 2K24	2024	Yes	No	
WWE 2K Battlegrounds	2020	Yes	No	
X-Men: Destiny	2011	Yes	No	
Zombieland: Double Tap – Road Trip	2019	Yes	No	

== Upcoming delistings ==
Title	Release year	Physical release	Internet required	Notes
theHunter: Classic	2009	No	Yes	Shutting down in November 2026.

=== PS3 and PS Vita digital stores closures ===
Title	Release year	Physical release	Notes
Comet Crash	2009	No	In July 2026, PlayStation announced that they would be permanently closing the PS3 and PS Vita digital stores in July 2027. The move is expected to result in the delisting of dozens to hundreds of PlayStation exclusives.
Infamous: Festival of Blood	2011	No	In July 2026, PlayStation announced that they would be permanently closing the PS3 and PS Vita digital stores in July 2027. The move is expected to result in the delisting of dozens to hundreds of PlayStation exclusives.
The Last Guy	2008	Yes	In July 2026, PlayStation announced that they would be permanently closing the PS3 and PS Vita digital stores in July 2027. The move is expected to result in the delisting of dozens to hundreds of PlayStation exclusives.
MotorStorm: RC	2012	Yes	In July 2026, PlayStation announced that they would be permanently closing the PS3 and PS Vita digital stores in July 2027. The move is expected to result in the delisting of dozens to hundreds of PlayStation exclusives.
Puppeteer	2013	Yes	In July 2026, PlayStation announced that they would be permanently closing the PS3 and PS Vita digital stores in July 2027. The move is expected to result in the delisting of dozens to hundreds of PlayStation exclusives.
Rain	2013	Yes	In July 2026, PlayStation announced that they would be permanently closing the PS3 and PS Vita digital stores in July 2027. The move is expected to result in the delisting of dozens to hundreds of PlayStation exclusives.
Silent Hill	1999	Yes	In July 2026, PlayStation announced that they would be permanently closing the PS3 and PS Vita digital stores in July 2027. The move is expected to result in the delisting of dozens to hundreds of PlayStation exclusives.
Siren: Blood Curse	2008	Yes	In July 2026, PlayStation announced that they would be permanently closing the PS3 and PS Vita digital stores in July 2027. The move is expected to result in the delisting of dozens to hundreds of PlayStation exclusives.
Tokyo Jungle	2012	Yes	In July 2026, PlayStation announced that they would be permanently closing the PS3 and PS Vita digital stores in July 2027. The move is expected to result in the delisting of dozens to hundreds of PlayStation exclusives.
Yakuza: Dead Souls	2011	Yes	In July 2026, PlayStation announced that they would be permanently closing the PS3 and PS Vita digital stores in July 2027. The move is expected to result in the delisting of dozens to hundreds of PlayStation exclusives.

== See also ==
- Stop Killing Games
- Video game collecting
- Video game preservation
