= Colin McRae Rally (2013 video game) =

Rally-racing video game

- Developer: Codemasters
- Publisher: Codemasters
- Producer: Pete Harrison
- Series: Colin McRae Rally
- Engine: Unity
- Platforms: iOS, Android, OS X, Windows
- Release: iOS; 27 June 2013; Android; 21 February 2014; OS X, Windows; 31 July 2014
- Genre: Racing
- Mode: Single-player

Colin McRae Rally is a rally racing video game developed and published by Codemasters. It was originally released for iOS mobile devices in June 2013, and then ported to Android devices and OS X and Windows personal computers (PCs) in 2014. Gameplay is similar to early iterations of the series with content predominantly taken from the 2000 title Colin McRae Rally 2.0. Players can drive cars and participate in point-to-point rally events, competing against times recorded by computer drivers. Stages take place in several different locations with varied terrain like tarmac and gravel. The game features damage modelling and chassis deformation effects that can be sustained from collisions.

The title marked Codemasters' debut in developing a mobile game internally. The goal of the project was to create a core, rally racing experience for mobile devices. The development team chose to use Colin McRae Rally 2.0 as the foundation, taking its tracks, driving model, and pacenotes for the new title. Original vehicle models were reused but aspects of the game's graphics were enhanced to provide the higher visual quality expected by modern standards. Numerous sound assets were replaced with samples from other Codemasters driving games.

Compared to the positive reception to previous games in the series, reception towards the 2013 release was mixed. The primary criticism among professional reviewers was the lack of content and omission of important features. However, the attempt to replicate the driving experience of classic Colin McRae Rally games was complimented. Critics generally believed that the level of difficulty and realistic driving model would appease rally fans and experienced players but might deter beginners. Upon release, the PC version was received negatively by players who were not expecting a mobile game port. The reaction prompted Codemasters to offer refunds to the players.

== Gameplay ==
Players can use on-screen buttons to steer and control the vehicle. The progress indicator at the top displays how much of the rally stage has been completed.

Colin McRae Rally is a racing video game in which players can drive cars in point-to-point rally events. The game can be played from a behind-the-car perspective or from a bonnet camera view. On mobile devices, cars can be steered using on-screen buttons which provide digital input or using tilt controls which provide analog input. The game features thirty rally stages from Colin McRae Rally 2.0, located in Australia, Corsica, and Greece. Terrain and surfaces vary between stages ranging from smooth tarmac roads to gravely off-road tracks. Track information is provided through verbal descriptions from the co-driver and icons that appear near the top of the screen. The icons display the severity and difficulty of turns using colour-coding. A progress indicator is also displayed on screen, so that the player can see how much of the course they have completed and compare their position to the computer drivers.

The game features three modes: Championship, Single Rally, and Single Stage. The Championship mode is split into eight rallies, each composed of either twelve or twenty-four stages. To win a rally, the player must attain the lowest total time against the computer drivers. The total time is taken as the summation of each individual stage time. Players begin the game with a single vehicle, the Ford Focus RS WRC; three additional cars—the Subaru Impreza WRX, the Mitsubishi Lancer Evolution VI, and the Lancia Stratos—can be unlocked by placing first in the championship rallies. During a race, vehicles can sustain damage from collisions, which can subsequently be repaired at intervals after every two events.

== Development and release ==
Colin McRae Rally was developed by Codemasters' Southam-based development studio. It was the company's first internally developed mobile game, and lead off an initiative to produce games for new and existing intellectual property specifically for mobile devices. The development team was composed of staff who had worked on early games and more recent Codemasters racing games. The game was initially designed for iOS mobile devices using Colin McRae Rally 2.0 as a basis. This early iteration of their Rally series was chosen as the foundation because it presented a focused rally racing experience, whereas later entries expanded to offer more gimmicks and game modes. Thirty stages from Rally 2.0 were faithfully reproduced; the team ensured that the position of every corner, obstacle, and surface transition matched the original rallies. While existing content and assets were reused, they also chose to take advantage of modern technology while creating Colin McRae Rally. The game was built using the Unity game engine and written in the C# programming language, closely referencing the original C source code to make certain that the handling and physics systems replicate Rally 2.0.

The development team felt that the original PlayStation era graphics of Rally 2.0 would not hold up to modern standards on a high pixel density mobile display. To improve the graphical quality they introduced modern shader-based rendering and overhauled the textures. The engine specifications for the vehicles were retained from the classic Rally games. Although the models for the vehicles were also preserved, developers increased their resolution and added more detail and graphical layers to the car bodies. Other features that were carried over include the chassis deformation effects and realistic buildup of dirt on the vehicles. PhysX-based collision detection was implemented to enable more objects and debris to scatter. Changes were also made to lighting, audio, controls, and user interface. The team decided to omit a number of Rally 2.0 features, such as multiplayer, manual transmission, variable gear ratios, weather reports, and the cockpit camera view. Game producer Pete Harrison cited creating a polished, core rallying experience for mobile as the focal point of the project and felt that some features would not be suitable for the short play sessions that they expected from a portable racing game.

The development team had access to Codemasters' full audio library, which was composed of sound assets dating from the first Colin McRae Rally (1998) up to Grid 2 (2013). On a case-by-case basis, they decided whether to reuse existing sounds or update them. The result was a combination of audio from various games; suspensions sounds were taken from Dirt 3, wind, gearbox and mechanical samples from Colin McRae Rally 2005, garage sounds from Race Driver: Grid, and music from Colin McRae Rally 04. One aspect of the audio that was kept intact was the original pacenotes read by professional co-driver Nicky Grist. The team did not want to disrupt the timing and delivery of critical track information so they opted to use the original recordings in this case. Support for custom soundtracks was added so that players could listen to their own music in-game.

The game was released for iOS devices on 27 June 2013. Thumbstar Games, collaborating with Codemasters released the game on Android devices on February 21, 2014. Codemasters later released the game for OS X and Windows personal computers on 31 July via the Steam digital distribution service.

== Reception ==
Reception

Aggregate score
Aggregator	Score
Metacritic	69/100

Review scores
Publication	Score
VideoGamer.com	5/10
Digital Spy	2/5
Pocket Gamer	7/10
TouchArcade	3/5

Colin McRae Rally received "mixed or average" reviews from professional critics according to review aggregator website Metacritic. Scott Nichols of Digital Spy thought the visual upgrade over the classic games would be appreciated by nostalgic fans but felt that controls were not up to par. He stated that steering was over-sensitive with both control schemes, and this issue was not rectified by the absence of options to adjust steering sensitivity. Pocket Gamer reviewer Mark Brown credited the game for taking the series back to its roots. However, he questioned some of the design choices, particularly the exclusion of features present in the original games that he regarded as important. He pointed out that the lack of manual transmission, cockpit view, and ability to tweak car settings may have been the result of trying to make the game more accessible among a wider audience or due to a rushed development cycle.

Writing for TouchArcade, Karl Burnett said the restricted set of environments made the game a bit of grind to play. He did praise the game's sense of speed and physics model however; he believed that the car handling and physics identically matched the first two iterations of the series. He concluded that it was a satisfactory game that was ultimately held back by the limited amount of content in the package. VideoGamer.com writer Pete Worth considered the game to be too difficult, highlighting that it had "limited appeal" amongst players who were not rally fans or dedicated to racing games. Slide to Play also agreed that the challenge posed by the game would by enjoyed by hardcore players but might be off-putting for a beginner. They identified some performance issues but ultimately thought that Codemasters had effectively transitioned the series from console to mobile devices.

The OS X and Windows versions of the game were subject to harsh criticism from players who were expecting a high definition remake of the original 1998 Colin McRae Rally rather than a port of the mobile game. Acting in response to the negative reaction, Codemasters updated the product's description on Steam to clarify previous misunderstandings and offered refunds to customers for a period of time.
