= Colin McRae Rally (1998 video game) =

1998 racing video game

- European PlayStation box art a Subaru Impreza WRC
- Developer: Codemasters (Note: Game Boy Color version developed by Spellbound)
- Publishers: Codemasters; PlayStation: NA: Sony Computer Entertainment; Game Boy Color: EU: THQ
- Series: Colin McRae Rally
- Platforms: PlayStation, Windows, Game Boy Color
- Release: PlayStation: EU: 15 July 1998; NA: 16 February 2000; Windows: EU: 9 October 1998; NA: 18 April 2000; Game Boy Color: EU: 21 September 2001
- Genre: Racing
- Modes: Single-player, multiplayer

Colin McRae Rally is a 1998 racing video game developed and published by Codemasters for the PlayStation and Windows. It features eight official cars and their drivers and rallies from the 1998 World Rally Championship season, in addition to four extra cars. A 2D version for the Game Boy Color, developed by Spellbound and published by THQ, was released in Europe in 2001.

Colin McRae Rally received generally favorable reviews and was commercially successful, with sales of over four million copies worldwide by 2002. The game's success led to several sequels in the Colin McRae Rally series, starting with Colin McRae Rally 2.0 in 2000.

== Gameplay ==
A screenshot of the PC version, in which the Mitsubishi Lancer Evolution IV Group A rally car is raced at the Rally New Zealand, stage 1

Colin McRae Rally is a rally simulation game, featuring the works-entered cars and the rallies of the 1998 World Rally Championship. There are three difficulty modes in the game, and each mode offers different cars: the Novice mode offers FWD F2-class cars, such as the SEAT Ibiza F2 Kit Car, the Intermediate mode offers 4WD World Rally Car class cars, such as the Subaru Impreza WRC, and the Expert mode offers the ability to unlock bonus cars, such as the Ford Escort MKII, Lancia Delta Integrale, Audi Quattro S1, and Ford RS200. There are a total of 12 cars, produced using laser-modelling. When released in North America in 2000, only 11 cars featured due to Codemasters losing the license to use Renault in Novice mode. Renault were replaced by extra drivers from the remaining 3 manufacturers. Also unlike in the European release of the game (real driver names), the American release has fictional driver names (apart from Colin McRae).

Seven official rallies (New Zealand, Acropolis (Greece), Australia, Monte Carlo, Sweden, Corsica, and the United Kingdom) and one unofficial rally (Indonesia) from the WRC were included in the game. Rally Indonesia was originally part of the 1998 WRC season calendar, but the rally was cancelled due to civil unrest. Although the rallies themselves are named the same as the real events, all of the stages are fictional.

When the game was re-released on the PlayStation "Value Series" budget label in 2000, Rally Monte Carlo was renamed as Rally Austria. On the loading screen for each rally, 2000 replaced the year 1998. The intro was cut in the later yellow "Bestsellers" version, and yellow logos on the Subaru Impreza car (front cover) were removed. The photograph on the back cover art (on earlier releases) of Colin and Nicky was also removed on the same "Bestsellers" version as Colin had joined Ford at that point.

Although there is no online multiplayer, the game does feature LAN-based multiplayer, allowing up to 8 drivers on the same network to compete simultaneously, in addition to a 2-player split-screen mode.

== Development ==
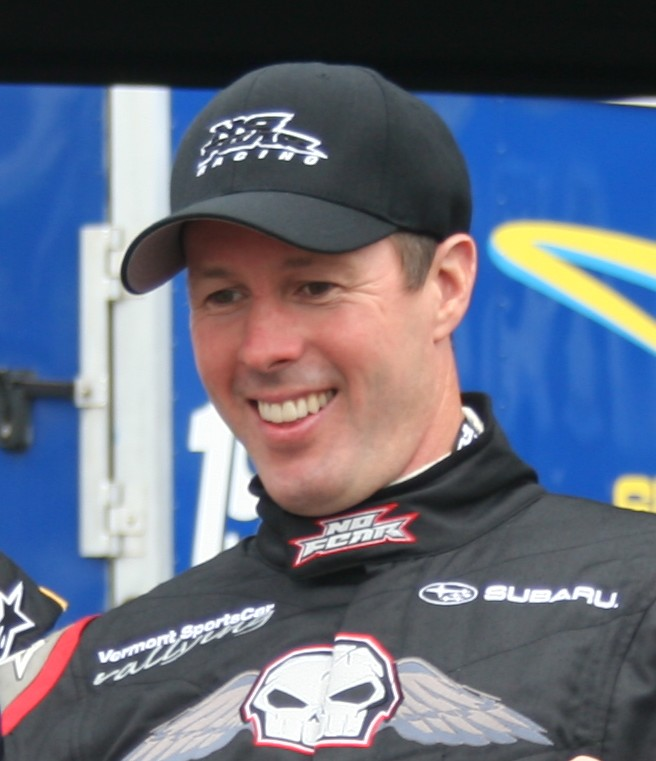
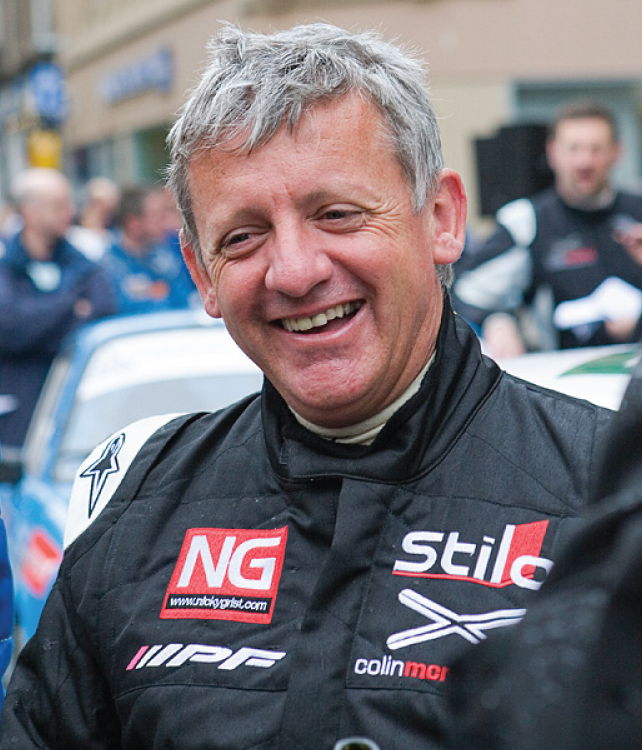
The game featured the voices of Colin McRae (left) and Nicky Grist (right), who also served as the series' technical consultants.

Codemasters have cited the arcade game Sega Rally Championship as a strong influence on Colin McRae Rally. Other influences included the PC game Screamer Rally and the Nintendo 64 game Wave Race 64. The company initially had some reservations on the viability of a realistic rally simulator, as similar games of the period such as V-Rally are only loosely based on the sport, essentially being head-to-head racing games in a rally-esque setting similar to rallycross; such an arcade mode would later be introduced in Colin McRae Rally 2.0. They eventually saw the potential after some early play testing with impromptu competitions within the team through an early prototype build of the game, prompting the team to move into full development.

Besides providing technical input on the game's handling, Colin McRae and his co-driver Nicky Grist voiced themselves in the game, with McRae himself serving as the Rally School instructor for the game's tutorial mode.

The game also included an Easter egg in the form of an alien abduction scene where the player's car is beamed upwards into a ship on certain special stages upon activating a cheat code (akin to Codemasters' own Game Genie cheat devices prior), parodying the Barney and Betty Hill incident in 1961.

== Reception ==
Reception

Aggregate score
Aggregator	Score	
Aggregator	PC	PS
GameRankings	77%	82%

Review scores
Publication	Score	
Publication	PC	PS
AllGame	N/A	3/5
Computer and Video Games	5/5	5/5
Edge	N/A	9/10
Electronic Gaming Monthly	N/A	7.75/10
GameFan	N/A	80%
GamePro	2.5/5	4/5
GameRevolution	N/A	B
GameSpot	6.6/10	5.6/10
GameZone	7/10	N/A
IGN	6.7/10	9/10
PlayStation Official Magazine – UK	N/A	9/10
Official U.S. PlayStation Magazine	N/A	4/5
PC Gamer (US)	75%	N/A
The Cincinnati Enquirer	N/A	3/4

At the 1999 Milia festival in Cannes, Colin McRae Rally took home a "Gold" prize for revenues above €30 million in the European Union during the previous year. By late 2002, its global sales had reached 4 million copies. The game was a bestseller in the UK and went on to become Codemasters' most successful boxed game in the UK.

Colin McRae Rally received "favorable" reviews on both platforms according to the review aggregation website GameRankings. Edge praised the PlayStation version's authentic simulation, but commented that graphical glitches sometimes occurred. Game Revolution criticized the same console version's graphics, lack of music and co-driver voicing, but praised its track variation and gameplay. GameSpot were far less positive, praising the PC version's driving experience, but criticizing the car setup procedure, the length of the stages, and the damage model. They were even less positive about the PlayStation port, criticizing its lack of originality. IGN were split, praising the PlayStation version's skill-based nature and its strong simulation, but also criticizing the PC version for being less exciting than traditional games. Official UK PlayStation Magazine praised the game's graphics and variety, and said that it "pushed the boundaries of the off-road racer to somewhere near the heights of Gran Turismo".
