= Colin McRae Rally 2.0 =

2000 video game

- European PlayStation box art
- Developer: Codemasters (Note: Game Boy Advance version developed by Spellbound)
- Publisher: Codemasters (Note: Game Boy Advance version published by Ubi Soft)
- Series: Colin McRae Rally
- Platforms: PlayStation, Windows, Game Boy Advance
- Release: PlayStation: UK: 9 June 2000; AU: 30 November 2000; NA: 5 December 2000; Windows: EU: 8 December 2000; NA: 9 February 2001; Game Boy Advance: EU: 4 October 2002; NA: 8 October 2002
- Genre: Racing
- Modes: Single-player, multiplayer

Colin McRae Rally 2.0 is a racing video game developed and published by Codemasters for PlayStation, Microsoft Windows and Game Boy Advance.

== Description ==
Gameplay screenshot showing the Ford Focus RS WRC as driven by McRae in the 2000 World Rally Championship season

Colin McRae Rally 2.0 features the works-entered cars and rallies of the 2000 World Rally Championship. The game has three difficulty levels: Novice, Intermediate and Expert. As with the previous game, Colin McRae Rally 2.0 lets players take part in rallying events set in various special stages across the world, and employs a number of cars featured in the 2000 World Rally Championship, such as the Ford Focus RS WRC and Subaru Impreza GC.

New features include arcade mode, with direct head-to-head competition against AI drivers or another player, improved graphics with more detailed vehicle models and interiors, and a cleaner, more minimalist menu system, which would be retained for the rest of the series until the release of Colin McRae: Dirt 2 in 2009. Nicky Grist, whom at the time was the co-driver for McRae in 2000, reprises his role from the first game, and would remain until the release of Colin McRae: Dirt in 2007; Grist later returned to voice himself in Dirt 4 in 2017.

The race features a selection of cars featuring engines with a capacity in the region of 2.0 litres, most of which were in production at the time of the game's release: the Ford Focus, Ford Puma, Mitsubishi Lancer Evo VI, Peugeot 206, SEAT Cordoba, Subaru Impreza, and Toyota Corolla. A number of cars which had been in production a decade or more earlier are also featured: the Ford Sierra Cosworth, Lancia Delta Integrale, MG Metro 6R4, and Peugeot 205 T16 from the 1980s, and the Ford Escort MK1, Mini Cooper S and Lancia Stratos from the late 1960s or early 1970s.

== Reception ==
Reception

Aggregate score
Aggregator	Score		
Aggregator	GBA	PC	PS
Metacritic	80/100	83/100	90/100

Review scores
Publication	Score		
Publication	GBA	PC	PS
CNET Gamecenter	N/A	N/A	9/10
Computer Gaming World	N/A	4/5	N/A
Electronic Gaming Monthly	N/A	N/A	9.5/10
Eurogamer	N/A	9/10	9.5/10
Famitsu	N/A	N/A	31/40
Game Informer	N/A	6.5/10	7.75/10
GameRevolution	N/A	N/A	B+
GameSpot	N/A	8.5/10	6.9/10
GameSpy	3.5/5	80%	N/A
IGN	8.9/10	8.9/10	9.4/10
Next Generation	N/A	N/A	4/5
Nintendo Power	2.9/5	N/A	N/A
Official U.S. PlayStation Magazine	N/A	N/A	5/5
PC Gamer (US)	N/A	87%	N/A

The Game Boy Advance and PC versions received "favourable" reviews, while the PlayStation version received "universal acclaim", according to the review aggregation website Metacritic. Doug Trueman of NextGen called the latter console version "A superb racer that has depth, a solid framerate, and high replay value. It doesn't get much better than this on PlayStation." In Japan, where the same console version was ported and published by Spike under the name Colin McRae the Rally 2 on 5 October 2000, Famitsu gave it a score of 31 out of 40. GamePro said of the PlayStation version, "If you're into racing at all, Colin McRae Rally 2.0 is definitely worth its sticker price. You might be surprised by how much you enjoy rally racing when it's done this well. (Note: GamePro gave the PlayStation version two 4.5/5 scores for graphics and fun factor, 3.5/5 for sound, and a perfect five for control.)

In their April 2001 issue, PC Gamer praised the PC version for its graphics, physics and damage modeling, as well as its many gameplay options. However, they criticized the short rally stages, the high difficulty, and most vehicles and tracks being locked until beating certain levels. Edge gave the PlayStation version a score of eight out of ten, saying, "Colin McRae Rally 2.0 will maintain a hold over any truly committed race fan for a long time. The demands of accurately navigating some of the most treacherous roads created in videogame history will be just too much for some. Those willing to take on the challenge can expect a level of absorption rarely delivered by any title in any genre." Computer Games Strategy Plus gave the PC version four stars out of five, calling it "an attractive and challenging game that, unlike so many other racing games, really does penalize you for running the pedal to the metal all the time." Michael Lafferty of GameZone gave the same PC version nine out of ten, saying, "When something is put together that, at first look, seems so simple, yet challenges by pumping the intensity level and challenging players to use their reflexes and brain, it qualifies as a game that is a great experience." Later, however, Louis Bedigian gave the Game Boy Advance version seven out of ten, saying that it was "worth a rental for racing fans. Some of you may even find that it is worth buying, but most gamers will think of it as a new candy bar: you try it once, maybe twice. But when the sweetness has diminished, you go back to buying the junk food that you've known and loved for years."

The PC version was nominated for the "Best Driving Game" award at GameSpot's Best and Worst of 2001 Awards, which went to NASCAR Racing 4.

The same PC version received a "Gold" sales award from the Entertainment and Leisure Software Publishers Association (ELSPA), indicating sales of at least 200,000 units in the UK.
