= Dirt Rally 2.0 =

DiRT Rally 2.0
- Cover art featuring a Volkswagen Polo Mk6
- Developer: Codemasters
- Publisher: Codemasters
- Series: Dirt
- Engine: Ego
- Platforms: Amazon Luna; PlayStation 4 Windows; Xbox One
- Release: PS4, Windows, Xbox One; 26 February 2019; Amazon Luna; 3 June 2021
- Genre: Racing simulation
- Modes: Single-player, multiplayer

Dirt Rally 2.0 (stylised as DiRT Rally 2.0) is a racing simulation video game developed and published by Codemasters for PlayStation 4, Windows, and Xbox One. It was released on 26 February 2019. A version for Amazon Luna followed on 3 June 2021. It is a successor to the 2015 video game Dirt Rally and emphasises realistic driving physics.

== Gameplay ==
Dirt Rally 2.0 is focused on rallying and rallycross. Players compete in timed stage events on tarmac and off-road terrain in varying weather conditions. The game features stages in Argentina, Australia, New Zealand, Poland, Spain and the United States. Codemasters also announced plans to expand the game through the release of downloadable content, and released stages in Finland, Germany, Greece, Monte Carlo, Sweden, and Wales. These stages are remastered versions of the stages included in the original Dirt Rally. There is also a rallycross mode with World RallyCross Supercars (including the lineup of the 2018 season) and eight circuits from the FIA World Rallycross Championship. Dirt Rally 2.0 lets players choose between a total of fifty cars, including the aforementioned World Rallycross Supercars, historic rally cars from the 1960s through the 1980s, Groups A, B and R rally cars, and modern rally cars from the 1990s to the late 2010s. This was later expanded to thirteen locations through downloadable content. Every car can have its setup adjusted before a race.

The game also features a new weather modelling system where changes in the weather affect the relative level of grip and require players to take a more nuanced approach to driving. The weather also affects visibility in stages. The surface of the stages is also subject to degradation; as more cars pass over a stage, more than 100 layers ensure that the road surface will start to shift and break up, affecting grip levels. The gameplay therefore demands maximum concentration, especially as some stages can take more than ten minutes to complete. There is no rewind function and damages not only have a visual but also mechanical effect, with it being possible to sustain "terminal damage", which automatically ends whatever race the car is in as a DNF (did not finish).

The "My Team" mode introduced in Dirt 4 is expanded upon, requiring players to hire specialist engineers to maintain the car. However, other elements such as customising liveries, signing sponsors, and expanding team facilities were removed. Damage sustained during a rally carries over from event to event. Players are also able to make a wider range of strategic choices, such as tyre compounds; softer tyres offer more grip but wear out faster, while harder tyres are more durable but produce slower stage times. Codemasters later introduced a more comprehensive tutorial for setting up the car to make the process more accessible for newcomers, amateurs and players who have been deterred from exploring setup options in the past.

The release of downloadable content follows a fortnightly schedule, and includes the return of rally locations from the first game, as well as cars such as the Škoda Fabia and BMW M1. The final DLC package is titled "Colin McRae: Flat Out". It features a new location in Perth and Kinross in Scotland, cars driven by Colin McRae, and a scenario mode where players re-enact moments from McRae's career.

== Development ==
Dirt Rally 2.0 is the first game in the series to be developed by Codemasters after game director Paul Coleman's departure from the company in early 2018. Rally drivers Ryan Champion and Jon Armstrong served as consultants throughout the game's development with occasional help from Oliver Solberg, while veteran co-driver Phil Mills lent his voice as the game's English-speaking co-driver. Neil Cole is the English-speaking voice of the rallycross spotter. As with other Codemasters racing games, the audio team meticulously recorded individual tracks of intake, exhaust, turbo and supercharger, transmission, and cabin noise from inside and outside of each real car featured in the game.

== Reception ==
Reception

Aggregate scores
Aggregator	Score
Metacritic	PC: 84/100; PS4: 84/100; XONE: 82/100
OpenCritic	90% recommend

Review scores
Publication	Score
Destructoid	6.5/10
Eurogamer	Essential
Game Informer	8.75/10
Hardcore Gamer	4.5/5
IGN	8.5/10
PC Gamer (US)	87/100
PCGamesN	9/10
Push Square	9/10

Dirt Rally 2.0 received "generally favorable reviews", according to review aggregator Metacritic. Fellow review aggregator OpenCritic assessed that the game received strong approval, being recommended by 90% of critics.

=== Awards ===
Year	Award	Category	Result	Ref.
2019	Develop:Star Awards	Best Audio	Nominated	
2019	The Independent Game Developers' Association Awards	Best Audio Design	Nominated	
2019	The Independent Game Developers' Association Awards	Best Racing Game	Nominated	
2019	The Game Awards 2019	Best Sports/Racing Game	Nominated	
2020	23rd Annual D.I.C.E. Awards	Racing Game of the Year	Nominated	
2020	NAVGTR Awards	Game, Franchise Racing	Nominated	
2020	MCV/Develop Awards	Visual Innovation of the Year	Nominated	
2020	16th British Academy Games Awards	British Game	Nominated	
