= Dirt 3 =

2011 racing video game made by Codemasters

DiRT 3
- Cover art featuring Ken Block's Ford Fiesta GYM3
- Developer: Codemasters Southam
- Publishers: Codemasters; Feral Interactive (OS X)
- Director: Nathan Fisher
- Producer: Darren Campion
- Series: Dirt
- Engine: Ego
- Platforms: Microsoft Windows; PlayStation 3; Xbox 360; OS X
- Release: Microsoft Windows, PlayStation 3, Xbox 360: NA/EU: 24 May 2011; AU: 26 May 2011; OS X: WW: 29 January 2015
- Genre: Racing
- Modes: Single-player; multiplayer

Dirt 3 (stylised as DiRT 3) is a racing video game developed and published by Codemasters and distributed by THQ for Microsoft Windows, PlayStation 3 and Xbox 360. It was released on 24 May 2011 and is the first game in the series without carrying the Colin McRae name. A sequel, Dirt 4, was released in June 2017.

The game features many rally drivers such as Ken Block, Tanner Foust, Liam Doran, Kris Meeke, Sébastien Ogier, Sébastien Loeb, Mohammed Ben Sulayem, and a multitude of others. The game features a variety of off-road events located in many different places all around the world, such as Asia, Africa, Europe, and North America, all of which bring the player an assortment of challenging real-world environments.

In September 2011, there were reports that a network security problem on the website of an AMD promo had resulted in the loss of 3 million Dirt 3 keys to the public for use via the Steam platform that have then been posted in various places around the internet.

== Gameplay ==
Gameplay in DiRT 3 showcasing the cockpit view

The main mode, "Dirt Tour", sees players earn reputation points in various events to gain the interest of sponsors who provide them with new vehicles. Flashbacks return from Colin McRae: Dirt 2, which can be used up to five times in any difficulty, but cost reputation points to use. New features include a "Hardcore mode" which limits players to the cockpit view (known as "head cam") with no driver assists, the appearance of rain and snow, and the ability to upload replay clips directly to YouTube. The game sees the return of many racing disciplines from Colin McRae: Dirt 2, but also introduces new modes and disciplines as well.

- Rallying takes place on technically challenging, non-circuit, point-to-point routes. They usually involve staggered starts, and each driver races against the clock for the fastest time over numerous stages. Also during Rally events, a co-driver is present reading pacenotes to guide the driver and warn them of possible dangers, such as crashes ahead of them.
- Rallycross racing takes place on closed, looped, circuit race tracks. These tracks can be a mix of gravel and tarmac, and involves many drivers pitted against each other over the same circuit on a series of laps. The driver who crosses the finish line first wins.
- Trailblazers are the equivalent of hillclimbing races. They take place on non-circuit, point-to-point courses, which can be a mix of gravel and tarmac. Similar to rally events, they involve staggered starts and each driver races to set the fastest time on the stages, but a co-driver is not present.
- Landrush events are similar to Rallycross events, but they switch vehicles to vigorous stadium trucks and buggies. They also take place on looped, circuit race tracks, but unlike Rallycross, these tracks are usually almost always on gravel. These tracks are also bumpier and have more obstacles than Rallycross. Drivers are pitted against each other, and the driver who crosses the finish line first wins.
- Gymkhana, new to the series, is a skill-based game mode where the player has to pull off tricks to gain as many points as possible. These challenging tricks include doughnuts, drifting through gates, jumps, controlled spinning in a zone, and smashing through foam blocks. Drivers who gain the most points from performing these tricks wins the event.
- Head-to-head events are similar to the Crossover events from Colin McRae: Dirt. Two drivers are pitted against each other to drive two lanes over a crossover track, which are typically a mix of gravel and tarmac. The driver who comes first is declared winner while the driver who comes second will be eliminated.

=== Special party modes ===
In addition to the normal off-road based modes, there are also various special online modes.

- "Invasion" involves drivers smashing wooden targets for points.
- "Outbreak" involves the "infected" drivers spreading the zombie infection as fast as possible.
- "Transporter" involves drivers playing in a capture-the-flag mode.

== Complete Edition ==
A "Complete Edition" of the game was released by Codemasters in 2012. Consisting of the game and its associated DLC packaged together, the Complete Edition adds several tracks and vehicles. It was released in March 9 in Europe and 20 March in North America. The Complete Edition for Mac OS X by Feral Interactive was released on 29 January 2015. The Complete Edition was removed from the Steam marketplace in early 2017 presumably due to expiring licenses for the cars.

== Reception ==
Reception

Aggregate score
Aggregator	Score
Metacritic	(PC) 86/100 (PS3) 87/100 (X360) 87/100

Review scores
Publication	Score
Destructoid	9/10
Eurogamer	9/10
Game Informer	8.75/10
GameSpot	9/10
GamesRadar+	4.5/5
GameTrailers	9.2/10
Giant Bomb	5/5
IGN	8.5/10
Official Xbox Magazine (UK)	8.5/10
PC Gamer (UK)	88/100
Push Square	9/10
The Guardian	4/5

IGN gave the game a score of 8.5 and an Editor's Choice award, praising the gameplay and online functionality while criticising some of the design choices. GameTrailers gave the game a score of 9.2, praising the gameplay and presentation, although criticising the limits of the YouTube functionality. GamesRadar gave the game a score of 9/10, praising its impeccable gameplay though noting slightly lower structure presentation compared to the previous game. Official Xbox Magazine gave the game a score of 8.5/10, hailing its impressive car design and smooth handling, while criticising the lack of dynamism in the surfaces and poor social features. Destructoid heavily lauded the game's graphics, detail, vehicle types, music, sound, tracks, and online multiplayer, while expressing minor annoyances with the long load times and announcers. Eurogamer wrote positively about the game's dynamic weather, Gymkhana mode, settings, and handling, writing, "DiRT 3 isn't a sim...it strikes a satisfying middle-ground...offering a tactile and engaging model that sits well across all of the game's many disciplines." Game Informer saw the addition of the Gymkhana mode as a major step forward for the franchise but thought that the focus on rally racing made the game's career mode a tedious one. PC Gamer wrote extremely positively, calling the game "dazzingly varied" and "relentlessly entertaining", while praising the rally handling and vehicle selection. Push Square awarded the game nine stars out of ten, concluding, "Everything from the game's core physics engine to the user-interface has been overhauled, resulting in a supremely polished experience that's going to be difficult to beat." GameSpot similarly praised new event types, accessible difficulty options, presentation, handling, vehicle variety, and both local and online multiplayer, while also noting the limited Youtube functionality.

Following reports that the PC version of the game was unplayable due to the game's reliance on the now defunct Games for Windows – Live software, a spokesperson for Codemasters issued a statement on the Steam community in January 2014 stating that Codemasters were in the process of removing Games for Windows – Live from the game, and would announce completion of the task at a later date. On 1 April 2015, the work had been completed and GFWL had been removed from the game.

The game was one of the November 2015 Games with Gold free games, the first of the promotion to be playable on Xbox One through backwards compatibility.
