= Dirt Rally =

Racing video game

DiRT Rally
- Cover art featuring a Volkswagen Polo R WRC
- Developer: Codemasters
- Publisher: Codemasters
- Series: Dirt
- Engine: Ego Engine 4.0
- Platforms: Windows; PlayStation 4 Xbox One; Linux macOS
- Release: Windows; 7 December 2015; PS4, Xbox One; 5 April 2016; Linux; 2 March 2017; macOS; 16 November 2017
- Genre: Racing simulation
- Modes: Single-player, multiplayer

Dirt Rally (stylised as DiRT Rally) is a racing simulation video game developed and published by Codemasters for Windows. A Steam Early Access version of the game was released on 27 April 2015, and the full version was released on 7 December. PlayStation 4, Xbox One and physical PC DVD versions were released on 5 April 2016. The Linux and macOS versions, developed by Feral Interactive, were released in 2017. A sequel, Dirt Rally 2.0, was released in February 2019. Official game servers were shut down by EA on November 8, 2025.

== Gameplay ==
Dirt Rally is a racing game focused on rallying and rallycross. Players compete in timed stage events on tarmac and off-road terrain in varying weather conditions. On release, the game featured 17 cars, 36 stages from three real world locations - Monte Carlo, Powys and Argolis - and asynchronous multiplayer. Stages range from 4 to 16 km. Subsequent updates added three more locations in the form of Baumholder, Jämsä and Värmland, as well as rallycross and player versus player multiplayer modes. Codemasters announced a partnership with the FIA World Rallycross Championship in July 2015, leading to the inclusion of the Lydden Hill Race Circuit (England), Lånkebanen (Norway), and Höljesbanan (Sweden) to the game.

Dirt Rally features a large number of vehicles in a wide variety of classes, and 16 manufacturers. It contains cars from the 1960s, 70s, 80s, Group B, Group A, Group R, 2000s and 2010s modern rally, rallycross and Pikes Peak, with cars having up to 10 liveries, as well as the lineup of the 2015 season.

In terms of image quality, a full 1080p resolution is delivered on both PS4 and Xbox One, with post-process anti-aliasing, along with matching art and effects work, whereas the PC version includes Steam Workshop that consists of preset setups made from each vehicles by users that helps benefit races from different terrains from different tracks (though the game holds up to 100 mods as subscribing to more than 100 mods will not function).

== Development ==
Dirt Rally was developed by Codemasters using the in-house Ego engine. Development began with a small team of 10–15 individuals following the release of their 2012 video game Dirt: Showdown. The team has emphasised a desire to create a simulation with Dirt Rally. They started by prototyping a handling model and creating tracks based on map data. The game employs a different physics model from previous titles, rebuilt from zero.

To recreate authentic car sounds, the developers recorded nearly fifty real world rally cars by placing up to ten microphones in each car's engine bay, at the intake, above the exhaust, and inside the cabin. The audio mix depends on the player's camera location, and also the surrounding environment due to modelling of reverb on each stage. The sound design team also captured details such as gravel kick-up, waste-gate chatter, and the whine of straight-cut transmissions. They primarily recorded on-track rather than on a rolling road in order to accurately capture the car going through its gears under load and also off-throttle deceleration. Game director Paul Coleman lent his voice as the game's English-speaking co-driver, recording calls whilst sitting on a D-Box motion rig as a level designer drove the stage, speaking into his own intercom system he uses for real-life co-driving.

An early version of Dirt Rally was showcased to journalists in late 2013, but the game wasn't officially announced until April 2015. It was released for Windows in early access on digital distribution service Steam. Coleman said that it was important to publicly release an unfinished build of the game so that the development team could get feedback from players. He expressed an interest in releasing Dirt Rally on consoles in the future but said that it was not possible, with it being an early access game at the time. Codemasters intended to introduce new cars, locations, and modes in monthly content updates, and make gameplay tweaks throughout the early access process. The full version of the game was released on 7 December same year. The game was released on PlayStation 4 and Xbox One on 5 April 2016.

== Reception ==
Reception

Aggregate score
Aggregator	Score
Metacritic	PC: 86/100; PS4: 85/100; XONE: 86/100

Review scores
Publication	Score
Edge	PC: 8/10
Eurogamer	PS4: 90
Game Informer	PC: 8.5/10
GamesMaster	PC: 88%
GameSpot	PS4: 8/10
GamesRadar+	XONE: 4/5
GameStar	PC: 90%
GamesTM	PC: 8/10
IGN	PC: 8.9/10
PlayStation Official Magazine – Australia	PS4: 90%
PlayStation Official Magazine – UK	PS4: 9/10
Official Xbox Magazine (UK)	XONE: 9/10
PC Gamer (UK)	PC: 80
Play	PS4: 90%
VideoGamer.com	PS4: 8/10
PlayStation Universe	PS4: 90%

Dirt Rally received "generally favorable reviews", according to review aggregator Metacritic.

GameStar gave the game 90% and said "Dirt Rally is the best rally simulation at the moment and one of the best racing games of all time. Beginners will find it to be quite difficult". GamesTM celebrated the change of direction, saying "this is the best thing the 'Dirt' name has ever been associated with and rallying enthusiasts are sure to be relieved that the obsession with the kind of American slang that was only partially hip in the 90s has been overcome and removed". Play said that "it doesn't patronise with gimmicky mechanics, nor is it a dry, joyless simulation". GameSpot praised the physics model, graphics, and the range of cars, but said that the "Hill Climb and Rallycross modes feel half-baked". Italian version of Eurogamer agreed too: "All we can hope for is new content - more cars and tracks".

GamesRadar highlighted the game's unforgiving nature: "Tires burst, radiators overheat, and you can frequently find yourself hobbling over the finish line with a slack time simply because you’ve lost control of your car once in an otherwise clean and competitive race". GamesMaster, Edge and IGN agreed. VideoGamer.com praised the game's "incredible speed", PlayStation Universe stated that it was better than Richard Burns Rally. Official PlayStation Magazine said it was "the most exhilarating driving game Codemasters has created in years, and undoubtedly the best rally game on PS4", with OXM adding "without question the best rally sim ever made". On the contrary, PC Gamer wrote: "Unfortunately, though, in physics and handling detail, it falls a little flat. The lack of any sort of precarious feel when flying over ice and mud is an absolute shame, and the amount of forced assistance is a disappointment. Anyone waiting for a new Richard Burns will need to carry on waiting".

Evo praised the audio, saying "at times, Dirt Rally excels. The sound design in particular is excellent, as is the wide variety of cars on offer. The audio in Dirt Rally really does deserve special mention. Not only is it some of the best we’ve heard in a racing game, it serves real purpose, with the co-driver almost perfectly matching his pace notes up with a stage". Of the graphics, they added: "While it definitely can’t come close to the production values of the likes of a Gran Turismo title, there is a lot of visual flourishes that impress with Dirt Rally". The Australian Official PlayStation Magazine said the game worked well with a steering wheel. Top Gear compared the game favorably to its rivals, stating "Sébastien Loeb Rally Evo’s handling remains nowhere near as satisfying or convincing as Dirt Rally’s superlative scrambling". Stuff magazine stated that this was "a game that leaves WRC 5 eating gravel".

The game reached number 1 in the UK PS4 physical sales chart, and number 19 in the European download chart. It reached number 2 in the UK multiformat physical sales chart in its week of release, only behind Quantum Break.

The month after the release, The Official PlayStation Magazine listed Dirt Rally as the 16th best PS4 game of all time. The Telegraph listed it in their top games of 2016. TechRadar included the game on their list of the "10 best racing games on PC". Octane put it at #1 on their list of the best sim racing games. At the BAFTAs, the game was nominated for the award for best sports game of 2016. Game Informer gave it their award for best racing game of the year. Gameplanet listed it as one of their best games of the year. Alphr put Dirt Rally in their top 5 PS4 racing games. PCGamesN said it was in the top 3 most realistic PC racing games.
