= Colin McRae: Dirt 2 =

2009 video game

- European cover art featuring Ken Block's Subaru Impreza WRX STI
- Developers: Codemasters; Firebrand Games (DS); Sumo Digital (PSP, Wii)
- Publishers: Codemasters; Feral Interactive (Mac OS X)
- Producer: Adam Askew
- Designer: Matthew Horsman
- Programmer: Matthew Craven
- Artists: Nathan Fisher; Daniel Oxford; Jorge Hernandez-Soria
- Series: Dirt
- Engine: EGO 1.0; Octane (DS)
- Platforms: Nintendo DS; PlayStation 3; PlayStation Portable; Wii; Xbox 360; Windows; Mac OS X
- Release: NA: 8 September 2009; EU: 11 September 2009; AU: 17 September 2009; AU: 24 September 2009 (DS); Windows: EU: 4 December 2009; NA: 8 December 2009; AU: 10 December 2009; Mac OS X: WW: 8 September 2011
- Genre: Racing
- Modes: Single-player, multiplayer

Colin McRae: Dirt 2 (stylised as Colin McRae: DiRT 2) known outside Europe as Dirt 2 is a racing video game developed and published by Codemasters in 2009, first for the Nintendo DS, PlayStation 3, PlayStation Portable, Wii and Xbox 360, and then later for PC platforms (Windows, Mac OS X). It is the sequel to Colin McRae: Dirt. Dirt 2 is the first game in the series since McRae's death in 2007 and the last to feature his name in the title. (Note: McRae's name was not featured in the game title for the North American release.) It is also the first and only game in the series to be available on a Nintendo home console and the last game in the series to be released on handhelds.

It features Ken Block, Travis Pastrana, Tanner Foust, Dave Mirra, and Mohammed Ben Sulayem. The game includes many new race-events, including stadium events. Along with the player, an RV travels from one event to another, and serves as "headquarters" for the player. It features a roster of contemporary off-road events, taking players to diverse and challenging real-world environments. The game takes place across Asia, Europe, Africa and North America. The game includes five different event types, plus three more "special" game modes. The World Tour mode sees players competing in multi-car and solo races at new locations, and also includes a new multiplayer mode. A sequel, Dirt 3, was released in 2011.

== Gameplay ==
Colin McRae: Dirt 2 features five racing disciplines, all of which are playable offline (against AI bots when applicable) and online. In addition, three "special modes" are included. Colin McRae: Dirt 2 runs on an updated version of the EGO engine, which powered Codemasters' Race Driver: Grid as well. The engine features, most notably, an updated physics engine, which models realistic weight transfer during turning maneuvers, allowing the player to incorporate advanced driving techniques, such as the Scandinavian flick.

- Rally racing occurs on non-circuit roads which usually involve public (closed) routes and technically challenging courses. Usually involving staggered starts, each driver competes against the clock. In addition, during rally events, a co-driver is present, constantly reading pacenotes to guide the driver along narrow and meandering tracks of up to 6 km in length. Rally races span across Baja California, Malaysia, China, Croatia, and Morocco.
- Rallycross races involve cars identical to those used in rally events; the races themselves, however, are very different. Each rally-cross race involves up to eight racers competing in multiple lap events on circuit tracks of mixed surface type. The tracks, half tarmac and half dirt, exist in closed settings, such as in or around stadiums, and are approximately 1 to 1.5 km in length. Rallycross races span across London, Los Angeles, and Japan.
- The most similar real-world equivalent to Trailblazer events are hillclimbing. Unlike hillclimbing events, however, trailblazer races do not require a positive change in elevation. Similar to rallying, trailblazer events feature staggered starts. Trailblazer (and hillclimbing) cars, unlike rally cars, usually feature massive aerodynamic aids, such as spoilers, diffusers, and splitters to help keep traction at higher speeds, regardless of track surface or conditions. Trailblazer events span across Utah, China, and Morocco.
- Raid races are multi-car events involving Group T1 cars or other heavyweight vehicles such as buggies and trophy trucks. Each race begins with a simultaneous start of up to eight competitors, with tracks averaging 5 km in length. Raid races span across Baja California, Croatia, Malaysia, and Morocco.
- Landrush events are similar to raid races, but take place on circuits reminiscent of those used for short course off-road racing. Each event features eight racers on a dirt track of about 1 km, and involve multiple laps. Landrush events span across Baja California, Malaysia, and Morocco.

=== Special Modes ===
In addition to the five straight game types, there are three special variants, each applicable to multiple modes.

- Gatecrasher, which uses Rally courses and cars, involves smashing yellow barriers; competitors race against the clock. When smashed, the "gates", strategically placed along the best racing line, add time to the clock; whichever racer finishes the event with the most time on the clock wins. The format of the race is more similar to a multi-competitor time trial than to a traditional rally race.
- Domination, playable across rallycross and landrush circuits, involves multiple drivers competing to set the lowest time in any given track sector. Points are awarded based on the final number of controlled sectors, as well as the final race position.
- Last Man Standing is an elimination-style race based on rallycross or landrush, during which the driver in last place is eliminated at 20-second intervals, the winner being the final driver left after all others are eliminated.

=== Multiplayer ===
Colin McRae: Dirt 2 features a set of multiplayer modes which the user can partake in over, the PlayStation Network, Games For Windows - Live and Xbox Live, as well as local multiplayer. Up to eight players can compete in ranked (Pro Tour) or unranked matches (Jam Session). Within the "Jam Session" category, any class of cars may be used on any track; the game lets hosts know when a combination is not necessarily advisable, such as Trailblazer cars on a Rallycross circuit. Ranked matches are, by comparison, much more restrained; only the prescribed cars may be used on a track.

== Development and release ==
Shortly before the release of Colin McRae: Dirt, Colin McRae: Dirt 2 was described by Matthew Horsman, chief game designer for the game, as a game more improved and refined than its predecessor. The engine, EGO, initially featured in Race Driver: Grid, was updated to better take advantage of the PlayStation 3 specifications, as well as improving multi-core processor utilization on the Xbox 360 and PC. The Flashback ability, allowing players to rewind time mid-race, a new feature in Grid, was kept and improved due to its popularity. In addition, the features and expanse of the multiplayer component, which was often criticized in Colin McRae: Dirt as being fairly anaemic, was completely new to the series.

Ken Block, a rally driver featured in Colin McRae: Dirt 2, served as a consultant throughout the game's development of the handling and physics model. For example, when Block was playing the first development build of the game, he had noticed the cars did not have enough grip. This was taken into consideration and the handling model was altered.

Colin McRae: Dirt 2 used the audio technology Ambisonics. It was the first PC video game to use Blue Ripple Sound's Rapture3D sound engine by default. It was also one of the first video games to implement the then newly released DirectX 11 graphical standard on ATI 5000 and NVIDIA GeForce 400 series chipsets. Firebrand Games, developer of Race Driver: Create and Race, developed a Nintendo DS version of Dirt 2 that would run on its Octane engine, also used by Firebrand's DS version of Race Driver: Grid, utilizing its 3-D graphics, user interface and track editor.

Colin McRae: Dirt 2 was an official sponsor of Ken Block, Travis Pastrana, Tanner Foust and Dave Mirra of the Subaru Rally Team USA.

A demo of the game was released on the PlayStation Store and Xbox Live Marketplace on 20 August 2009. The demo appeared for the PC on 29 November; it features the same content as the console demo with the addition of higher graphic settings and a benchmark tool. The Mac OS X version of the game was released by Feral Interactive.

In February 2009, Codemasters revealed plans to release "a number of small DLC packs soon after launch which players can use to personalise and augment the boxed game". Ultimately, Codemasters only released two small downloadable content items, which essentially functioned like cheat codes. They were "Trust Fund", which unlocks all vehicles, liveries and upgrades, and "Access All Areas", which unlocks all events and tracks.

== Reception ==
Reception

Aggregate score
Aggregator	Score
Metacritic	(PC) 89/100 (PS3) 87/100 (X360) 87/100 (DS) 73/100 (PSP) 55/100 (WII) 51/100

Review scores
Publication	Score
Destructoid	9.5/10
Eurogamer	8/10
GameSpot	9/10 (WII) 4.5/10
GamesRadar+	4.5/5
GameTrailers	9.0/10
GameZone	(PSP) 8/10
IGN	8.4/10 (DS) 8/10 (PSP) 4.2/10 (WII) 4/10
Nintendo World Report	(DS) 8/10 (WII) 4/10
Play	87%
Push Square	9/10
VideoGamer.com	9/10

The PlayStation 3, Xbox 360 and PC versions of Colin McRae: Dirt 2 received positive reviews from critics, receiving a Metacritic score of 89 for the PC and 87 for the two HD consoles. These versions were reviewed positively by IGN, receiving a score of 8.4/10 from the U.S. site, and a slightly more favourable 9/10 from the UK site. Eurogamer gave those same versions Colin McRae: Dirt 2 a score of 8/10 with their main criticisms being reserved for the lack of weather and track deterioration, and the fact that damage now has very little influence on the game, with drivers receiving a brand new car for each race. In Japan, Famitsu gave the PlayStation 3 and Xbox 360 versions a score of one nine, one eight, and two nines, for a total of 35 out of 40.

The Nintendo DS version was regarded by a smaller number of reviewers to be almost as good as the PS3, Xbox 360 and PC versions, achieving a Metacritic score of 73. IGN and Nintendo World Report gave that version an 8 out of 10, praising its quick setup and meaty content, including the ability to upgrade and customize cars, as well as design custom courses. The Sumo Digital versions released on Wii and PSP were deemed to be the worst, with Metacritic scores of 51 and 55 respectively. IGN faulted both versions for their poor controls, AI and content, giving out a score of 4 and 4.2 respectively.

During the 13th Annual Interactive Achievement Awards, the Academy of Interactive Arts & Sciences nominated Dirt 2 for "Racing Game of the Year".
