= Colin McRae Rally 04 =

2003 video game

- Citroën Xsara
- Developer: Codemasters
- Publisher: Codemasters
- Series: Colin McRae Rally
- Platforms: PlayStation 2, Xbox, Windows
- Release: PlayStation 2: PAL: 19 September 2003; Xbox: PAL: 19 September 2003; NA: 2 March 2004; Windows: EU: 2 April 2004; AU: 23 April 2004
- Genre: Racing
- Modes: Single-player, multiplayer

Colin McRae Rally 04 is a 2003 racing video game developed and published by Codemasters for PlayStation 2, Xbox and Windows.

== Gameplay ==
There are six championships to complete in the game. There are 4 classes of cars: 4WD, 2WD, Group B and Bonus. The bonus class are cars that are not usually raced in rallies. These cars are only here for extra pleasure. The game has rally tracks in 8 countries with a total of 52 stages.

Unlike in the previous three games, this game has no official WRC team license. All of the cars' liveries are either fictitious or taken from championships other than the WRC. Nicky Grist is replaced by Derek Ringer as the primary co-driver voice in the game, though Grist's voice set is still accessible via game settings.

== Release ==
Colin McRae Rally 04 was initially released for PlayStation 2 and Xbox in Australia and Europe on 19 September 2003, with the Xbox version alone releasing in North America the following year on 2 March 2004. A port for Windows was released in Europe on 2 April 2004 and in Australia on 23 April 2004.

== Reception ==
Reception

Aggregate scores
Aggregator	Score		
Aggregator	PC	PS2	Xbox
GameRankings	85.78%	85.09%	85.47%
Metacritic	87/100	83/100	84/100

Review scores
Publication	Score		
Publication	PC	PS2	Xbox
Computer and Video Games	N/A	90%	N/A
Edge	N/A	8/10	8/10
Electronic Gaming Monthly	N/A	N/A	8.33/10
Eurogamer	N/A	N/A	8/10
Game Informer	N/A	N/A	8.5/10
GamePro	N/A	N/A	4.5/5
GameRevolution	N/A	N/A	B+
GameSpot	8.8/10	N/A	8.8/10
GameSpy	N/A	N/A	4.5/5
GamesTM	N/A	70%	N/A
GameZone	N/A	N/A	8.9/10
IGN	N/A	N/A	8.7/10
PlayStation Official Magazine – UK	N/A	9/10	N/A
Official Xbox Magazine (US)	N/A	N/A	8.5/10
PC Gamer (UK)	91%	N/A	N/A
Maxim	N/A	N/A	8/10

Colin McRae Rally 04 was met with positive reception; it has a score of 86% and 87 out of 100 for the PC version, 86% and 84 out of 100 for the Xbox version, and 85% and 83 out of 100 for the PlayStation 2 version according to GameRankings and Metacritic. It was nominated for GameSpot's annual "Best Budget Game" award, which went to ESPN NFL 2K5.
