= Jen Horsey =

Jen Horsey (born October 28, 1975) is a Canadian automotive journalist, TV personality and motorsport competitor with a specialty in rallying and rallycross.

Horsey is a longtime contributor to ESPN’s digital and television programming. who, in 2012, became ESPN’s first-ever female motorsport analyst, broadcasting from the announce booth for X Games and other rallycross competition. She debuted on-air at ESPN as an in-car commentator in 2009. In what was reported as a television first, she and fellow commentator Chrissie Beavis rode along in the passenger seat with top drivers during racing competition and offered their analysis and commentary live-to-air. She and Beavis returned to the broadcast in the same capacity the following year. In 2011, Horsey joined the on-air team at X Games as a pit reporter for rallycross. In addition, her numerous articles on automotive and other topics have appeared in a vast range of media outlets, primarily in the United States and Canada.

In competition, Horsey is best known as a rally co-driver, although she has also competed as a rally driver in both the US and Canada. She is the voice of the co-driver in the third installment of the Codemasters video game, DiRT 3, and returned for DiRT 4. Her most notorious co-driving appearance came in 2008 during X Games competition when, during a head-to-head race against Dave Mirra (and his co-driver Alexander Kihurani) driver Andrew Comrie-Picard shorted the 70 ft (20 m) gap jump and her team’s Mitsubishi Lancer Evolution IX made a spectacular front-flip. Neither Horsey nor the driver were injured.

Since 2005, Horsey has earned four division podium finishes, including two wins, in five appearances as a co-driver at the Targa Newfoundland rally. Her first Modern division victory came in 2006 as co-driver to Keith Townsend in a Subaru WRX STi. She repeated in 2008 alongside Andrew Comrie-Picard in a factory supported Mitsubishi Lancer Evolution X. In 2011, she co-drove Ralph Gilles in a Dodge Viper and the duo finished third in the Modern division. In 2012, she moved to Open division with driver Samuel Hubinette and finished in second-place in a factory supported 2012 Fiat Abarth. She has also co-driven Steve Millen at Targa New Zealand in a Nissan GTR, as well as competing in numerous stage rallies, primarily in Canada, with various other drivers.
