= Dirt 5 =

2020 racing video game made by Codemasters

DIRT 5
- Cover art of the game featuring an Aston Martin Vantage GT4
- Developer: Codemasters Cheshire
- Publisher: Codemasters
- Director: Robert Karp
- Producers: Stuart Boyd; Gaz Wainwright
- Designer: Michael Moreton
- Programmer: David Springate
- Artist: Amrish Wadekar
- Writers: Luca Uccellatori; Olly Johnson
- Series: Dirt
- Platforms: PlayStation 4; PlayStation 5; Windows; Xbox One; Xbox Series X/S; Stadia
- Release: PS4, Windows, Xbox One: WW: 6 November 2020; Xbox Series X/S: WW: 10 November 2020; PlayStation 5: NA/AU: 12 November 2020; WW: 19 November 2020; Stadia: WW: 29 March 2021; Amazon Luna: US: 15 July 2021
- Genre: Racing
- Modes: Single-player, multiplayer

Dirt 5 (stylised as DIRT 5) is a racing video game developed and published by Codemasters. The game was released for PlayStation 4, Windows, and Xbox One on 6 November 2020, for Xbox Series X/S on 10 November, and for PlayStation 5 on 12 November (for North America, Oceania, Japan, and South Korea) and 19 November (for most other regions), for Stadia on 29 March 2021, and for Luna on 15 July 2021. It was the last video game released by Codemasters as a publisher before being acquired by Electronic Arts (EA) on 18 February 2021.

== Gameplay ==
Dirt 5, like its predecessors, is a racing game focused on off-road racing. Disciplines within the game include rallycross, ice racing, Stadium Super Trucks and off-road buggies. Players can compete in events in a wide range of locations, namely Arizona, Brazil, China, Greece, Italy, Morocco, Nepal, New York City, Norway and South Africa. The game includes a dynamic weather system and seasons, which affect the racing; for example, the player can only compete in ice racing events in New York during winter months. A four-player splitscreen system is also introduced into the game.

Dirt 5 also features a narrative-focused career mode that pits the player character against a rival driver called Bruno Durand (voiced by Nolan North) in a series of championships. The player also has a mentor called Alex “AJ” Janiček (voiced by Troy Baker) who provides them with advice throughout their career. The game was also not to feature a cinematic replay. Instead, the game would follow in a series of podcasts by Donut Media that follows the storyline.

== Development and release ==
Dirt 5 was announced during the 2020 Xbox Games Showcase presentation. In addition to releasing on the PlayStation 4, Windows, and Xbox One platforms, it was available for the ninth generation of video game consoles PlayStation 5 and Xbox Series X/S. Xbox versions of the game support Microsoft's "Smart Delivery" program, which allows the player to purchase the Xbox One copy of the game and receive the Xbox Series X/S version. PlayStation 4 owners can also update to the PlayStation 5 version at no additional cost. The game was developed by Codemasters Cheshire, formerly known as Codemasters Evo, developers of Onrush. It is also powered by the evolved game engine of Onrush. Many of its staff worked on Driveclub and MotorStorm.

== Reception ==
Reception

Aggregate score
Aggregator	Score
Metacritic	PC: 72/100; PS4: 79/100; XONE: 83/100; XSXS: 81/100; PS5: 80/100

Review scores
Publication	Score
Destructoid	8/10
Game Informer	8.5/10
GameSpot	7/10
Hardcore Gamer	4/5
IGN	8/10
PC Gamer (US)	60/100
PCGamesN	8/10
Push Square	8/10
Shacknews	8/10

It was nominated for the category of Best Sports/Racing game at The Game Awards 2020, as well as "Racing Game of the Year" at the 24th Annual D.I.C.E. Awards.

Praising the 120 Hz refresh rate, PlayStation Official Magazine – UK listed it as the 5th best game on the PS5.
