= Nicky Grist =

British rally co-driver (born 1961)

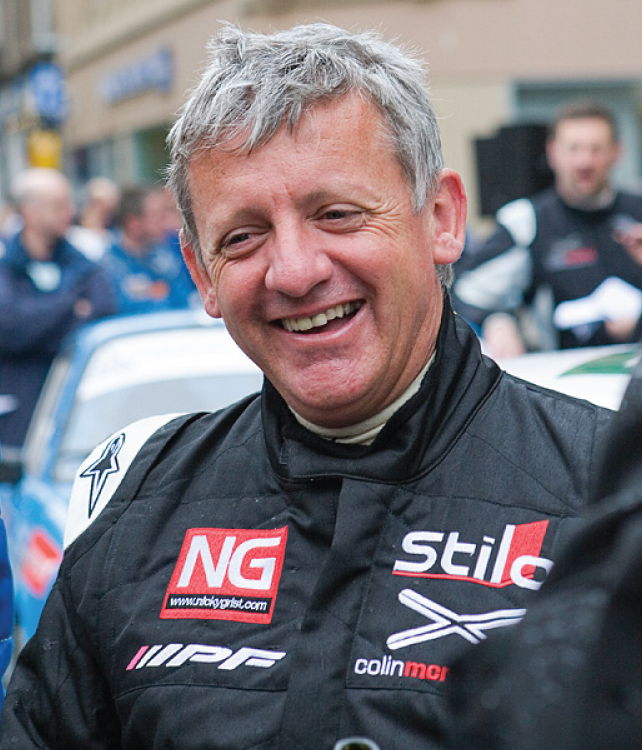
- Grist in 2010

Personal information
- Nationality: (United Kingdom) British
- Full name: Nicholas Mark Grist
- Born: 1 November 1961 (age 65); Ebbw Vale, Wales

World Rally Championship record
- Years active: 1985–2002, 2005–2006
- Driver: (United Kingdom) Stuart Nicholls (United Kingdom) Simon Davison (United Kingdom) Harry Hockly (United Kingdom) David Metcalfe (United Kingdom) Malcolm Wilson (Sweden) Mikael Ericsson (Germany) Armin Schwarz (Finland) Juha Kankkunen (United Kingdom) Colin McRae
- Teams: Vauxhall, Volkswagen, Ford, Toyota, Mitsubishi, Subaru, Škoda, Citroën
- Rallies: 128
- Championships: 0
- Rally wins: 21
- Podiums: 43
- Stage wins: 417
- First rally: 1985 RAC Rally
- First win: 1993 Rally Argentina
- Last win: 2002 Safari Rally
- Last rally: 2006 Rally of Turkey

Nicholas Mark Grist (born 1 November 1961) is a British former rally co-driver from Wales, born in Ebbw Vale. His factory team career in the World Rally Championship lasted from 1993 to 2002. He won 21 rallies with more than one driver.

Grist's first WRC win was in the Rally Argentina in 1993 with Juha Kankkunen, who at that time was a three times WRC champion. Grist and Kankkunen went on to win the 1993 WRC championship with Toyota. Grist stayed as Kankkunen's co-driver until 1997 when he joined Colin McRae with the 555 Subaru World Rally Team.

Grist remained Colin McRae's co-driver until the Rally New Zealand 2002, during which time the pair won 17 rallies, 27 podium finishes and gained overall 183 WRC points. Between 2002 and 2006, Grist and McRae also competed together in a number of one-off rallies.

== Career ==
=== Early years 1985–1989 ===
Grist started his career as a golf professional at the Monmouthshire Golf Club, and then joined a local car sales centre, where he was given Sundays off. This gave him the opportunity to enter into the relatively inexpensive motorsport of road rallying. His first rally was the George Ford Pips Rally, held in Caldicott in Wales, in a Ford Escort with Bryn Wiltshire driving.

- 1982 Competed in the Welsh 1300 Road Rally Championship with Steve Davies and won the 1300 class that year
- 1983 Competed in the Welsh Road Rally Championship in an Escort RS 2000 with Steve Davies and won the overall championship
- 1984 Competed in the Motoring News Road Rally Championship in the same Escort RS 2000 with Steve Davies. Won the Agbo, Eagle and Cilwendeg Rallies.
- 1985 Competed in the Vauxhall Nova Junior Cup, his first stage rally championship, with driver Steve Davies. He also competed in his first WRC rally, the Lombard RAC Rally, with Stuart Nicholls in a Vauxhall Astra GTE
- 1986 Competed in the British National Championship with Steve Davies for the Volkswagen Junior Rally Team in a VW Golf GTi. He also competed in British Open Championship in an early Group A Toyota with Graham Middleton as driver.
- 1987 Competed in the British Open Championship with driver Graham Middleton, in a Group A Toyota Corolla, ending second in class.
- 1988 Joined Vauxhall driver, Harry Hockly, in a development programme of the Group A 1600 Vauxhall Nova. Competed in the British Open Championship, finishing with a win at the Lombard RAC Rally, in a Group A 1300 version of the Nova.
- 1989 Competed in the British Open Championship with driver David Metcalfe in the Vauxhall 1600 Nova developed the previous year. In this year Nicky earned his first wage as a co-driver.

=== World Rally Championship ===
==== 1990–1993 Ford / Toyota ====
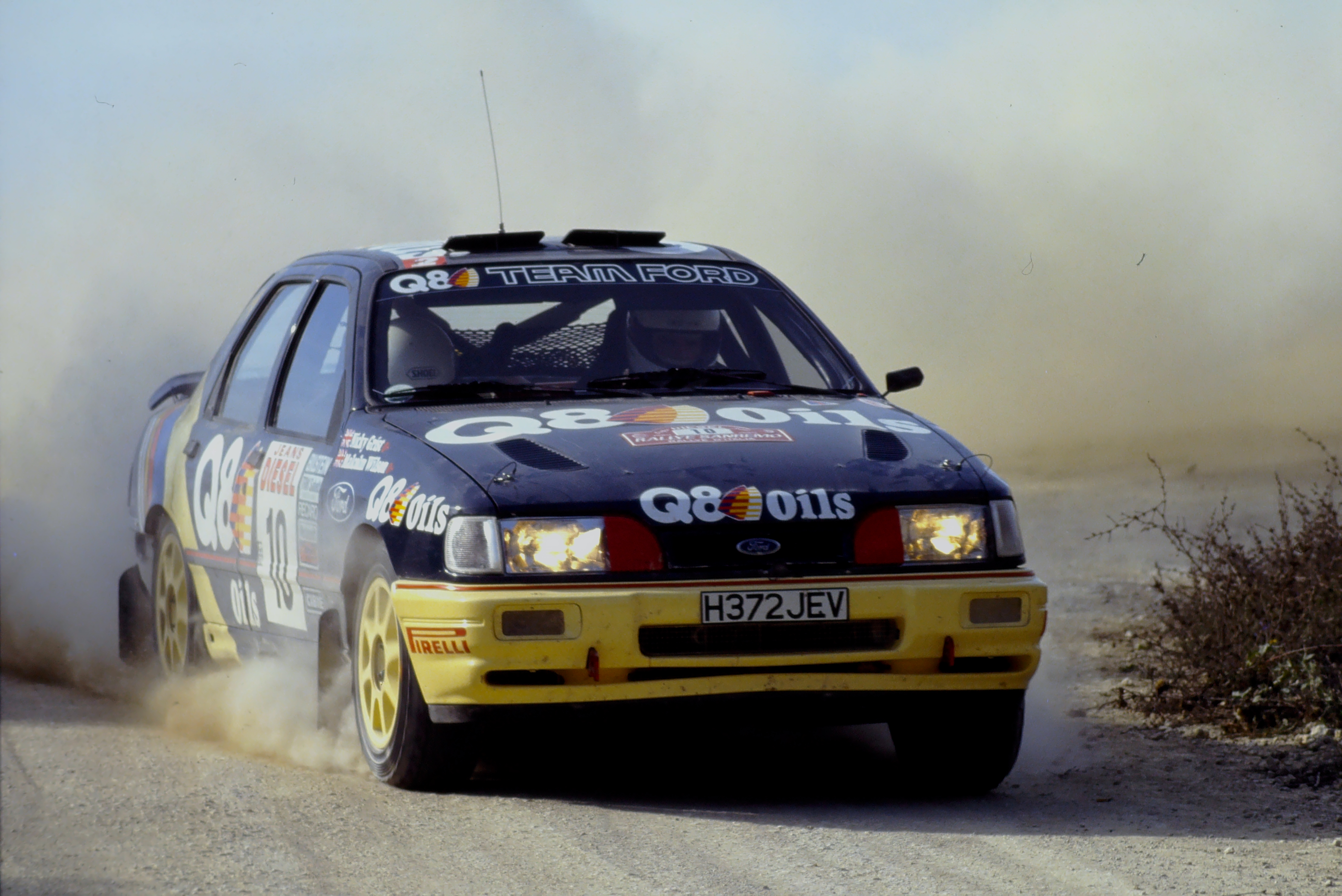
Wilson/Grist took part to 1990 Sanremo rally in this Ford, retiring in SS25

Grist became a full-time professional co-driver with the Ford Motor Company and driver Malcolm Wilson. Competed in the British Open Championship in a Sierra Sapphire Cosworth. Also took part in a test and development programme with Ford's new 4x4 Sapphire Cosworth, consisting of three WRC events, giving Grist his first experience of a WRC event outside Britain. In 1991, he competed in six rounds of the WRC with Malcolm Wilson and the Ford Motor Company. In 1992, only competed in the Safari Rally of the WRC with Toyota Team Europe with driver Mikael Ericsson where the team came fourth. He also co-ordinated with the team for Rally Acropolis and Argentina giving him an insight into the inside working of Team 2.

==== 1993–1997 Mitsubishi and Toyota ====
Grist joined Mitsubishi with driver Armin Schwarz, in the WRC, but during the Rally Argentina joined Juha Kankkunen. With Kankkunen he went on to win the rally Argentina, Grist's first WRC win. Kankkunen and Grist went on to win two more rallies, Rally Australia and the Rally GB. This secured Kankkunen's fourth WRC win. Halfway through 1993, Toyota and Kankkunen bought Grist's contract and he moved to the Toyota team full-time competing in the Celica GT4 ST185. The season began well with a second in Monte Carlo and a win in Portugal, but during the Safari Rally, crashed at 180 km/h after hitting a pothole that had formed due to the rain. By mid season, Grist and Kankkunen were tied at the top of the points with Carlos Sainz, but after mechanical problems and the a crash in Finland put them 20 minutes behind and they finished the WRC in third position. In 1995, with only two rallies to go, Kankkunen and Grist started the Rally Catalunya in a comfortable lead, seven points ahead of Colin McRae and the 555 Subaru World Rally Team, when they crashed and had to retire. After the Rally Catalunya, Toyota were found guilty of the implementation of illegal turbo restrictor bypasses on their ST205 cars. The team was given a 12-month ban by the FIA. In 1996, Grist competed with Kankkunen for private Toyota teams in three events and finished fourth in Sweden, third in Indonesia and second in Finland.

==== 1997–2002 Subaru and Ford ====
Grist joined the 555 Subaru World Rally Team on a two-year contract as Colin McRae's co-driver. With six retirements and five wins, Grist and McRae came second overall with 62 points, giving the Subaru team the manufacturer's title. In 1998, Grist and McRae had five retirements and three wins together with the same team, with the win in Corsica, giving Grist his first win on tarmac. The team finished third with 45 points and gave Subaru their third consecutive manufacturer's title. In 1999, Grist and McRae moved from Subaru to the M-sport Ford team of Malcolm Wilson, Grist's driver during the 1990 to 1991 WRC seasons, where they had two consecutive wins at the Safari Rally and Rally Portugal. However, due to reliability issues with the new Ford Focus WRC they only managed to finish sixth in the WRC with 23 points. The 1999 season of retirements only finished in the February 2000 when they finished third in the Swedish Rally. However, even with two wins and three seconds to support Sweden's third place a further six retirements after the initial Monte Carlo Rally retirement meant that they ended up fourth in the championship with 43 points overall. With the improvement in reliability of the Focus WRC 00 towards the later half of 2000 Grist joined with McRae, signed a further two-year contract with Ford, and started 2001 with three retirements and a ninth at the Swedish Rally. The middle of the 2001 season showed better with three consecutive wins, followed by a retirement on the Safari Rally, and then two podium finishes. The season ended with a second place in the championship and 42 points, two points behind fellow Brit, his arch rival Richard Burns. 2002 was Grist's last competitive season of WRC, and again saw him co-drive for McRae and Ford. During this year, there were four retirements and two wins, one of these being the Acropolis Rally, making four consecutive wins in Greece, and the other being the last Safari Rally, on its 50th anniversary. However, several disagreements between Grist and McRae led to their split after the Rally New Zealand conflict, and Derek Ringer, McRae's old co-driver took over and finished the championship with him.

== Later career ==
=== 2003–2005 Television ===
In 2003, Grist began working for TV, on the programmes that produced the rally coverage for broadcasters around the world. He primarily worked for two different programmes, Speed TV in the US and the other the review programme that went out worldwide for all the WRC rounds. Grist worked as the presenter of the programme for Speed TV, explaining the rules and showing why a particular stage is a challenge. With the review programme, Grist worked as much behind the scenes, helping recce the rallies for great TV positions, planning the overall programmes, identifying the splits so that journalists can ask why a particular competitor did well or not.

=== 2005–2006 WRC ===
In 2005, Grist again joined Colin McRae as co-driver, in a Škoda Fabia WRC, for the Rally GB. It was in this rally that Markko Märtin's co-driver Michael Park, from Newent, Gloucester, a long-term friend of Grist's was killed when their Peugeot hit a tree. Grist and McRae finished seventh just ahead of fellow Brit, Mark Higgins with Sébastien Loeb refusing the ten points from that stage win, in respect for the loss of his friend. Later that same year they raced the Skoda in Rally Australia, and in some stages leading the way, however, team mechanics issues resulted in the two having to retire.

=== 2006–2007 ===
In 2006, Grist joined McRae for X Games 12 in Los Angeles, America, and throughout the televised event they fought for the lead, however on the last jump they landed badly, popped a tyre and then rolled but still managed to right themselves, losing only two seconds in the roll, getting to the finish line just over half a second behind Travis Pastrana and Christian Edstrom, and in front of Ken Block and Alex Gelsomino, bringing them to the attention of many Americans who had never heard of them before. The last WRC rally together was at the Rally of Turkey, in 2006, the last competitive WRC event for both Grist and McRae, but they were unable to finish and retired on the last stage, due to alternator problems with their Citroen Xsara WRC of the Kronos Citroen World Rally Team.

On 15 September 2007, McRae and his five-year-old son, Johnny, with Graeme Duncan and Johnny's six-year-old friend Ben Porcelli were killed in a helicopter crash, piloted by McRae, near his home in Lanark, Scotland. The funeral for Colin and Johnny McRae took place on Wednesday 26 September at Daldowie Crematorium near Glasgow where McRae and his son were cremated in the same coffin.

=== 2007–today ===
Grist regularly sits in the co-drivers seat for various drivers such as the Roger Albert Clark Rally amongst other events, but has mostly retired from co-driving and is now heading his own motorsports business. Nicky also appeared in a special episode of the British automotive magazine show Fifth Gear alongside Mark Higgins, instructing the hosts as they participate in a rally.

In 2019, Grist participated in the non-competitive Eifel Rallye Festival as a driver in his Celica GT4 ST185, his first event since 2001's Omloop van Vlaanderen where he also took the driver's seat.

== Other ventures ==
=== Colin McRae Rally ===
In 1998, whilst racing with Colin McRae, Codemasters developed a game for PlayStation and Microsoft Windows entitled Colin McRae Rally, in which Grist lent his voice and likeness as a co-driver, guiding players around various special stages in eight countries. The game used real drivers and their cars from the 1998 WRC and featured McRae and Grist's Subaru from 1998 on the front cover. Through this Grist's voice has become familiar to many who played the game. Colin McRae Rally was soon followed by Colin McRae Rally 2.0, with subsequent games featuring Grist until Colin McRae Rally 2005. Archive recordings of Grist's pace notes were used in the 2013 Colin McRae Rally mobile game. Grist later reprised his role as one of the default co-drivers (alongside Jen Horsey) in Dirt 4.

=== Nicky Grist Motorsport ===
In 2006, Ludovico and Elena Fassitelli, the Italian owners and creators of Stilo helmets, approached Grist to become the sole UK distributor of the Stilo range and through this he set up Nicky Grist Motorsport, based near his home in Pontrilas, Herefordshire. Through this retail outlet, Grist stocks quality racewear and accessories for all rally, road and track competitors, as well as providing all competitors with Stilo helmets, intercoms and HANS devices. With customers such as Petter Solberg, Ken Block, Kris Meeke and Sébastien Loeb, Grist is still in touch with all that is happening in the WRC. In addition, Grist is unofficially a consultant to the FIA WRC, concerned with matters of safety, helmet and HANS device regulations to the British sport. As a Welshman, he gives talks to business through the Welsh Assembly, and is a regional judge for the F1 in Schools competition.

== Personal life ==
Grist married Sharon in 1993, at Abergavenny, Wales, in the middle of the recce for Rally Portugal.

== Complete WRC results ==
| Year | Entrant | Car | 1 | 2 | 3 | 4 | 5 | 6 | 7 | 8 | 9 | 10 | 11 | 12 | 13 | 14 | 15 | 16 | WDC | Pts |
|---|---|---|---|---|---|---|---|---|---|---|---|---|---|---|---|---|---|---|---|---|
| 1985 | GM Dealer Sport | Vauxhall Astra GTE | MON | SWE | POR | KEN | FRA | GRC | NZL | ARG | FIN | ITA | CIV | GBR; 23 | | | | | NC | 0 |
| 1986 | Volkswagen Junior Rally Team | Volkswagen Golf GTI | MON | SWE | POR | KEN | FRA | GRE | NZL | ARG | FIN | CIV | ITA | GBR; 19 | USA | | | | NC | 0 |
| 1987 | GM Dealer Sport | Vauxhall Nova | MON | SWE | POR | KEN | FRA | GRE | USA | NZL | ARG | FIN | CIV | ITA | GBR; 42 | | | | NC | 0 |
| 1988 | GM Dealer Sport | Vauxhall Nova | MON | SWE | POR | KEN | FRA | GRC | USA | NZL | ARG | FIN | CIV | ITA | GBR; 25 | | | | NC | 0 |
| 1989 | Vauxhall Dealer Sport | Vauxhall Nova GTE | SWE | MON | POR | KEN | FRA | GRC | NZL | ARG | FIN | AUS | ITA | CIV | GBR; Ret | | | | NC | 0 |
| 1990 | Q8 Team Ford | Ford Sierra RS Cosworth 4x4 | MON | POR | KEN | FRA | GRC | NZL | ARG | FIN; Ret | AUS | ITA; Ret | CIV | GBR; Ret | | | | | NC | 0 |
| 1991 | Q8 Team Ford | Ford Sierra RS Cosworth 4x4 | MON; 7 | SWE | POR; Ret | KEN | FRA; 5 | GRE; Ret | NZL | ARG | FIN | AUS | ITA; 10 | CIV | ESP | GBR; Ret | | | 18th | 13 |
| 1992 | Toyota Team Kenya | Toyota Celica Turbo 4WD | MON | SWE | POR | KEN; 4 | FRA | GRC | NZL | ARG | FIN | AUS | ITA | CIV | ESP | GBR | | | 25th | 10 |
| 1993 | Mitsubishi Ralliart | Mitsubishi Lancer Evo I | MON; 6 | SWE | POR; Ret | KEN | FRA | GRC; 3 | | | FIN; 9 | | | | | | | | 2nd | 108 |
| 1993 | Toyota Castrol Team | Toyota Celica Turbo 4WD | | | | | | | ARG; 1 | NZL; 5 | | AUS; 1 | ITA | ESP; 3 | GBR; 1 | | | | 2nd | 108 |
| 1994 | Toyota Castrol Team | Toyota Celica Turbo 4WD | MON; 2 | POR; 1 | KEN; Ret | FRA; 4 | GRC; 3 | ARG; Ret | NZL; 2 | FIN; 9 | | | | | | | | | 3rd | 93 |
| 1994 | Toyota Castrol Team | Toyota Celica GT-Four ST205 | | | | | | | | | ITA; 7 | GBR; 2 | | | | | | | 3rd | 93 |
| 1995 | Toyota Castrol Team | Toyota Celica GT-Four ST205 | MON; 3 | SWE; 4 | POR; 2 | FRA; 10 | NZL; 3 | AUS; 3 | ESP; Ret | GBR | | | | | | | | | DSQ | 62 |
| 1996 | Toyota Castrol Team Sweden | Toyota Celica GT-Four ST205 | SWE; 4 | KEN | | | | | | | | | | | | | | | 7th | 37 |
| 1996 | Toyota Team Australia | Toyota Celica GT-Four ST205 | | | IDN; 3 | GRC | ARG | | | | | | | | | | | | 7th | 37 |
| 1996 | Team Toyota Castrol Finland | Toyota Celica GT-Four ST205 | | | | | | FIN; 2 | AUS | ITA | ESP | | | | | | | | 7th | 37 |
| 1997 | 555 Subaru World Rally Team | Subaru Impreza WRC | MON; Ret | SWE; 4 | KEN; 1 | POR; Ret | ESP; 4 | FRA; 1 | ARG; 2 | GRC; Ret | NZL; Ret | FIN; Ret | IDN; Ret | ITA; 1 | AUS; 1 | GBR; 1 | | | 2nd | 62 |
| 1998 | 555 Subaru World Rally Team | Subaru Impreza WRC | MON; 3 | SWE; Ret | KEN; Ret | POR; 1 | ESP; Ret | FRA; 1 | ARG; 5 | GRC; 1 | NZL; 5 | FIN; Ret | ITA; 3 | AUS; 4 | GBR; Ret | | | | 3rd | 45 |
| 1999 | Ford Motor Co Ltd. | Ford Focus WRC | MON; DSQ | SWE; Ret | KEN; 1 | POR; 1 | ESP; WD | FRA; 4 | ARG; Ret | GRC; Ret | NZL; Ret | FIN; Ret | CHN; Ret | ITA; Ret | AUS; Ret | GBR; Ret | | | 6th | 23 |
| 2000 | Ford Motor Co Ltd. | Ford Focus RS WRC 00 | MON; Ret | SWE; 3 | KEN; Ret | POR; Ret | ESP; 1 | ARG; Ret | GRC; 1 | NZL; 2 | FIN; 2 | CYP; 2 | FRA; Ret | ITA; 6 | AUS; Ret | GBR; Ret | | | 4th | 43 |
| 2001 | Ford Motor Co Ltd. | Ford Focus RS WRC 01 | MON; Ret | SWE; 9 | POR; Ret | ESP; Ret | ARG; 1 | CYP; 1 | GRC; 1 | KEN; Ret | FIN; 3 | NZL; 2 | ITA; 8 | FRA; 11 | AUS; 5 | GBR; Ret | | | 2nd | 42 |
| 2002 | Ford Motor Co Ltd. | Ford Focus RS WRC 02 | MON; 4 | SWE; 6 | FRA; Ret | ESP; 6 | CYP; 6 | ARG; 3 | GRC; 1 | KEN; 1 | FIN; Ret | GER; 4 | ITA; 8 | NZL; Ret | AUS | GBR | | | 5th | 33 |
| 2005 | Škoda Motorsport | Škoda Fabia WRC | MON | SWE | MEX | NZL | ITA | CYP | TUR | GRC | ARG | FIN | GER | GBR; 7 | JPN | FRA | ESP | AUS; Ret | 25th | 2 |
| 2006 | Kronos Racing | Citroën Xsara WRC | MON | SWE | MEX | ESP | FRA | ARG | ITA | GRE | GER | FIN | JPN | CYP | TUR; Ret | AUS | NZL | GBR | NC | 0 |

=== Other events ===
| # | Event | Season | Rally Driver | Car | Team | Y/E Position |
|---|---|---|---|---|---|---|
| – | (Isle of Man) Tudor Webasto Manx International Rally / ERC20 | 1989 | Dave Metcalfe | Vauxhall Nova GTE | Vauxhall Dealer Sport | 4 |
| – | (Belgium) 24 Heures d'Ypres / ERC20 | 1995 | Juha Kankkunen | Toyota Celica Turbo 4WD | Toyota Castrol Team | Ret |
| – | (Switzerland) Rallye International du Valais/ ERC5 | 1995 | Juha Kankkunen | Toyota Celica Turbo 4WD | Toyota Castrol Team | Ret |

| # | Event | Season | Co-driver | Car | Position |
|---|---|---|---|---|---|
| 15 | (Belgium) Omloop van Vlaanderen | 2001 | Yves Preal | Ford Puma Kit Car | 41 |
| 12 | (Germany) Eifel Rallye Festival | 2019 | Phil Hall | Toyota Celica Turbo 4WD | N/A (show event only) |
