= Colin McRae Rally and Dirt =

Video game series

- Genre: Racing
- Developer: Codemasters
- Publishers: Codemasters; Electronic Arts
- Platforms: Android; Game Boy Advance; Game Boy Color; iOS; Linux; Microsoft Windows; Mobile; N-Gage; Nintendo DS; OS X; PlayStation; PlayStation 2; PlayStation 3; PlayStation 4; PlayStation 5; PlayStation Portable; Wii; Xbox; Xbox 360; Xbox One; Xbox Series X
- First release: Colin McRae Rally; 15 July 1998
- Latest release: Dirt 5; 6 November 2020

Dirt and Dirt Rally (stylized as DiRT and DiRT Rally, formerly known as Colin McRae Rally), is a rally racing video game series developed and published by Codemasters. Codemasters had acquired the exclusive license to the World Rally Championship series in June 2020, which began as a five-year deal in 2023.

Started in 1998, the franchise has been a critical and commercial success and is generally acknowledged as a pioneer of realistic rally sports racing games. The series is named after the World Rally Championship driver Colin McRae, who provided extensive technical advice during development.

After McRae's death in September 2007, Codemasters used his name one more time in Colin McRae: Dirt 2, dropping the moniker in Dirt 3. The McRae name was then used once again in 2013 in the mobile release of Colin McRae Rally.

In 2021, Codemasters has announced entry into the 2021 Junior WRC season as "Codemasters Dirt Rally Team", which was later rebranded in the 2022 Junior WRC season as "EA Sports Rally Team" on behalf of EA Sports, as a result to Electronic Arts' acquisition of Codemasters.

== Games ==
Aggregate review scores
Game	Metacritic
Colin McRae Rally	(PC) 77% (Note: GameRankings score) (PS1) 82%
Colin McRae Rally 2.0	(GBA) 80/100 (PC) 83/100 (PS1) 90/100
Colin McRae Rally 3	(PC) 82% (PS2) 86/100 (Xbox) 86/100
Colin McRae Rally 04	(PC) 87/100 (PS2) 85% (Xbox) 84/100
Colin McRae Rally 2005	(PC) 83/100 (PS2) 84% (PSP) 72% (Xbox) 83/100
Colin McRae: Dirt	(PC) 84/100 (PS3) 83/100 (X360) 83/100
Colin McRae: Dirt 2	(DS) 73/100 (PC) 89/100 (PS3) 87/100 (PSP) 55/100 (Wii) 51/100 (X360) 87/100
Dirt 3	(PC) 86/100 (PS3) 87/100 (X360) 87/100
Dirt: Showdown	(PC) 72/100 (PS3) 75/100 (X360) 75/100
Colin McRae Rally (2013)	(iOS) 69/100
Dirt Rally	(PC) 86/100 (PS4) 85/100 (XONE) 86/100
Dirt 4	(PC) 78/100 (PS4) 85/100 (XONE) 86/100
Dirt Rally 2.0	(PC) 86/100 (PS4) 84/100 (XONE) 82/100
Dirt 5	(PC) 72/100 (PS4) 79/100 (PS5) 80/100 (XONE) 83/100 (XSX) 81/100

=== Colin McRae Rally (1998) ===
Colin McRae Rally, the first title in the series, was released for the PlayStation and Microsoft Windows platforms in January 1998 in the United Kingdom and in September 1999 in the United States. The game featured real cars and drivers from the 1998 World Rally Championship season. Colin McRae's Subaru Impreza was featured on the game's cover.

In Novice mode there are 3 stages per rally, each followed by a Service Area, making it easier to adjust the vehicle to the different conditions of each stage and repair the damage.

=== Colin McRae Rally 2.0 (2000) ===
The second game in the series, and it features the works-entered cars and the rallies of the 2000 World Rally Championship. There are 3 difficulty levels, namely Novice, Intermediate and Expert. New features include Arcade mode, with direct head-to-head competition against AI drivers or another player, and a cleaner and more minimalistic menu system, which would be retained for the rest of the series until the release of Dirt 2 in 2009. The game was a bestseller in the UK, and again later in the year. A version for the iOS was released in June 2013. IGN gave it a score of very high 9.4/10.

=== Colin McRae Rally (2001) ===
The first handheld entry in the series was released for the Game Boy Color in Europe in 2001. It was developed by Spellbound Entertainment and published by THQ. It features 2D graphics.

=== Colin McRae Rally 3 (2002) ===
The first Colin McRae game released for the Xbox, as well as the PlayStation 2. It features rally cars from the 2002 World Rally Championship. A GameCube version was announced but it was cancelled. It uses an autosave feature. IGN ranked it as the 91st best PlayStation 2 game. The staff praised its improvement and technology.

=== Colin McRae Rally 04 (2003) ===
This fourth incarnation of the Colin McRae Rally series, unlike in the previous three games, has no official WRC team license. All of the cars' liveries are either fictitious or taken from championships other than the WRC.

=== Colin McRae Rally 2005 (2004) ===
The 2005 incarnation of the McRae franchise was released for PlayStation 2, Xbox, Microsoft Windows and PlayStation Portable and has over 70 stages spread over nine countries. There are over 30 cars available. There is also a revised graphics and damage engine that enables paint scratches on the car, and a new 'career' mode where the player starts out in the lower club leagues and works their way up to compete with Colin McRae in his 2004 Dakar Rally Nissan Pick-Up. In 'Championship' mode the player takes the role of Colin himself competing in six rallies using any 4WD car.

The game's graphic engine allows for more realistic damage effects and a blurred vision effect if the player comes into contact with a hard object.

An OS X version of this game, renamed as Colin McRae Rally Mac, has been published by Feral Interactive and developed by Robosoft Technologies and represents the first Macintosh release of a CMR series game. It was released on 26 October 2007, six weeks after McRae's death in a helicopter crash. The development of the game was fraught with problems. Apple's switch to Intel Macs, some behind-the-scenes changes at Feral and other issues conspired to keep Colin McRae Rally Mac from being released until fairly late into 2007, despite it being based on PC-game underpinnings that Windows gamers had been enjoying since late 2004. Feral chose to make this release as independent of the PC franchise as possible to avoid any issues that might date it, calling it Colin McRae Rally Mac rather than attaching a year to it. Two mobile game versions of this game were created, a N-Gage title developed by Ideaworks3D and a J2ME title developed by IOMO and published by Digital Bridges. The N-Gage version reused stages from Colin McRae Rally 2.0. Both were nominated for BAFTAs in the Mobile and Handheld categories respectively.

=== Colin McRae: Dirt (2007) ===
At E3 2006, Codemasters revealed that a new McRae game was in development for Microsoft Windows, Xbox 360 and PlayStation 3, titled Colin McRae: Dirt in Europe, and Dirt: Colin McRae Off-Road in the United States.

The title was released on 15 June 2007 in Europe and on 19 June in North America for Microsoft Windows and Xbox 360. The PlayStation 3 version was released on 14 September.

=== Colin McRae: Dirt 2 (2009) ===
In November 2008, Codemasters unveiled a sequel to the successful Colin McRae: Dirt; it was released in September 2009. The game is available on PlayStation 3, PlayStation Portable, Wii, Xbox 360 Nintendo DS, and Microsoft Windows. The game is built upon an improved version of the Ego game engine that powered the previous game, as well as a comprehensive online mode. The game was dedicated to Colin McRae, who had died in 2007, featuring videos and a special tournament in his honor.

=== Dirt 3 (2011) ===
Dirt 3 was released in May 2011, but the Colin McRae name was not used in the title.

=== Dirt: Showdown (2012) ===
Dirt: Showdown, an "arcade-style spin-off", was released on Microsoft Windows, PlayStation 3 and Xbox 360 in May 2012.

=== Colin McRae Rally (2013) ===
The 2013 game Colin McRae Rally shares the same name of the 1998 release but the game's content and driving model are taken directly from the 2000 title Colin McRae Rally 2.0. This version was released on iOS in 2013 and ported to Windows, OS X and Android in 2014.

=== Dirt Rally (2015) ===
Dirt Rally is a racing video game focused on rallying. It was announced on 27 April 2015, and was released into Steam's early access that day and seeing its full release on 7 December 2015. Versions for PlayStation 4 and Xbox One were released in April 2016.

=== Dirt 4 (2017) ===
In January 2017, Codemasters announced Dirt 4. The game launched on 9 June 2017 on PlayStation 4, Windows, and Xbox One.

=== Dirt Rally 2.0 (2019) ===
Codemasters announced Dirt Rally 2.0 in September 2018 and released it on 26 February 2019. The game is a continuation of the dedicated simulation of Dirt Rally as opposed to the emphasis on accessibility of Dirt 4.

=== Dirt 5 (2020) ===
In May 2020, Codemasters announced Dirt 5. The game was launched in November 2020 for Microsoft Windows, PlayStation 4, PlayStation 5, Xbox One and Xbox Series X and in March 2021 for Google Stadia.

== Future ==
It was suspected in 2022 that work on Dirt games has been suspended in order to develop the upcoming WRC-licensed game. On 1 September 2023, EA Sports confirmed that the next game will be titled EA Sports WRC, with a full reveal taking place on 5 September. The game was released on 3 November 2023.
