= Dirt 4 =

2017 racing video game made by Codemasters

DiRT 4
- Retail cover art featuring a Ford Fiesta R5
- Developer: Codemasters
- Publisher: Codemasters
- Series: Dirt
- Engine: Ego
- Platforms: PlayStation 4 Windows; Xbox One; Linux macOS
- Release: NA: 6 June 2017; PAL: 9 June 2017; Linux, macOS: WW: 28 March 2019
- Genre: Racing
- Modes: Single-player, multiplayer

Dirt 4 (stylised as DiRT 4) is a racing video game developed by Codemasters for PlayStation 4, Windows, and Xbox One in June 2017, and for Linux and macOS in March 2019 by Feral Interactive.

A sequel, Dirt 5, was released in November 2020.

== Gameplay ==
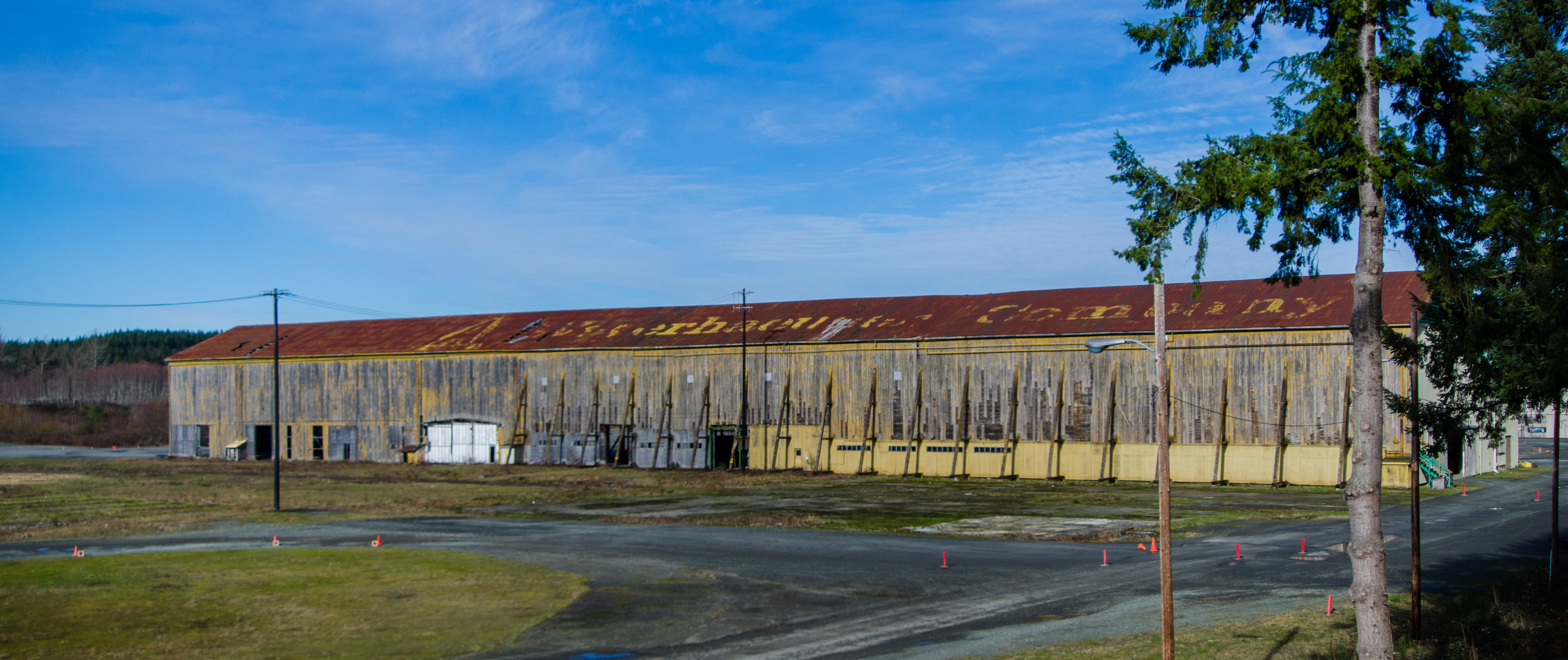
Dirt 4 features a recreation of the DirtFish rally school (Former Weyerhaeuser Mill pictured) which serves as the game's tutorial level.

Dirt 4 is a racing game focused on rallying. Players compete in timed stage events on tarmac and off-road terrain in varying weather conditions. Rally stages span five locations: Fitzroy in Australia, Tarragona in Spain, Michigan in the United States, Värmland in Sweden and Powys in Wales. Cars are drawn from a wide variety of competition classes and time periods, such as the Group B cars of the 1980s, Group A and Group N cars from the 1990s and 2000s, and Group R cars from the 2010s. The game does not feature World Rally Cars or any elements associated with the World Rally Championship. Dirt 4 introduces a new feature called "Your Stage" that procedurally generates rally stages based on a setting and parameters that the player defines. As the game does not feature any licensed content for its rally mode, Your Stage is used to generate all of the stages that the player drives on in career mode.

The game features rallycross racing and carries a FIA World Rallycross Championship license. It includes five rallycross circuits: Lydden Hill Race Circuit in Great Britain, Höljesbanan in Sweden, Lånkebanen in Norway, the Circuit de Lohéac in France and the Pista Automóvel de Montalegre in Portugal, as well as the lineup of the 2016 season. Lohéac and Montalegre are new to the series. Both rallycross Supercars and RX Lites are included. The game also features multiplayer and cross-platform leaderboards. Landrush mode returns, featuring stadium trucks and buggy racing, with stages from locations in California, Nevada and Mexico. Dirt 4 sees the return of the popular Dirt 3 mode "Joyride" which features multiplayer mini games. The game also features a tutorial level in the form of a recreation of the DirtFish rally school in Snoqualmie, Washington.

Dirt 4 builds upon the team management systems introduced in Dirt Rally and Grid Autosport, with the player hiring personnel to repair the car, oversee the day-to-day operations, and boost the team's profile to secure new sponsors. Players are also able to buy and sell new and used cars, with previous results and accident histories affecting the resale value of the car.

== Development and release ==
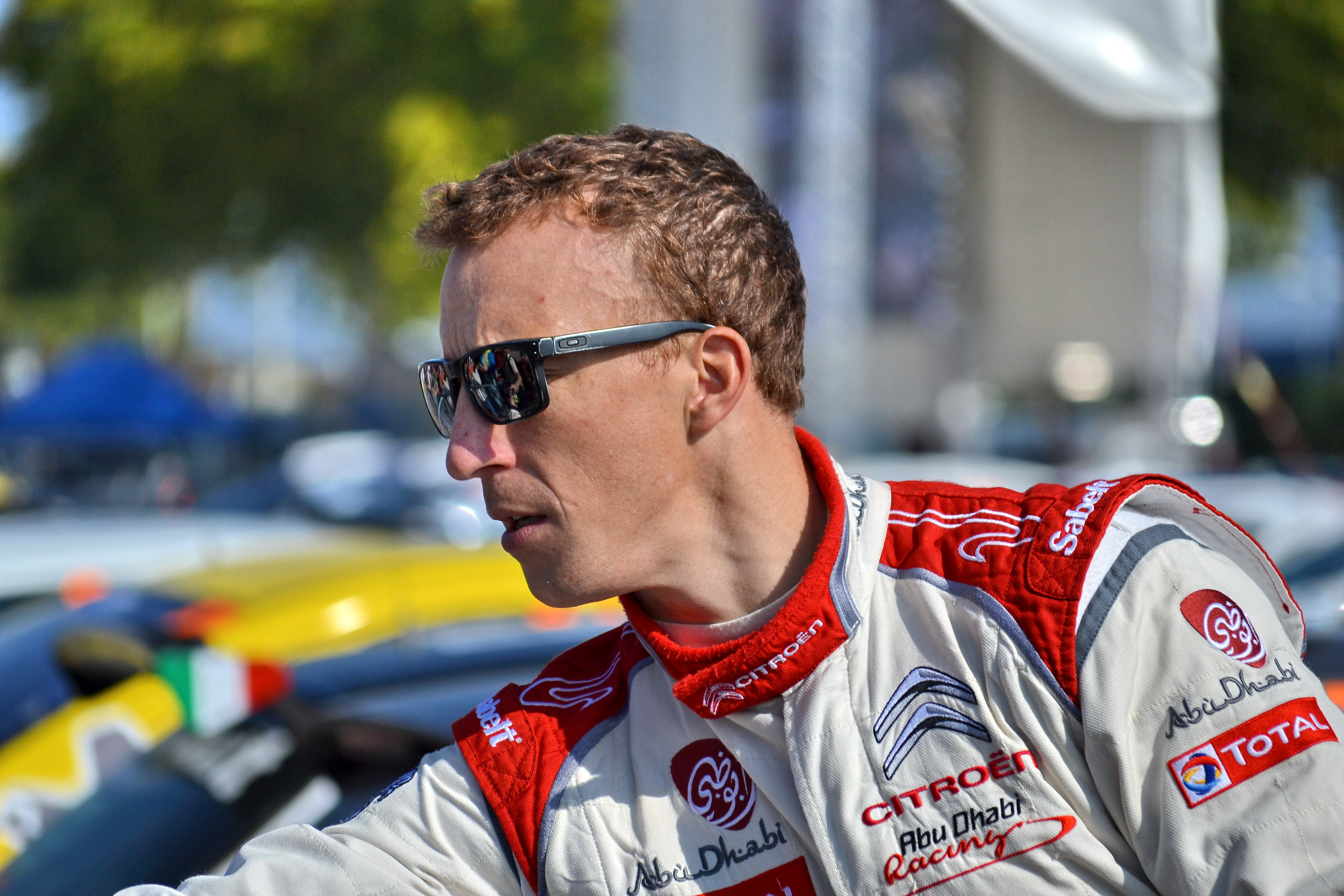
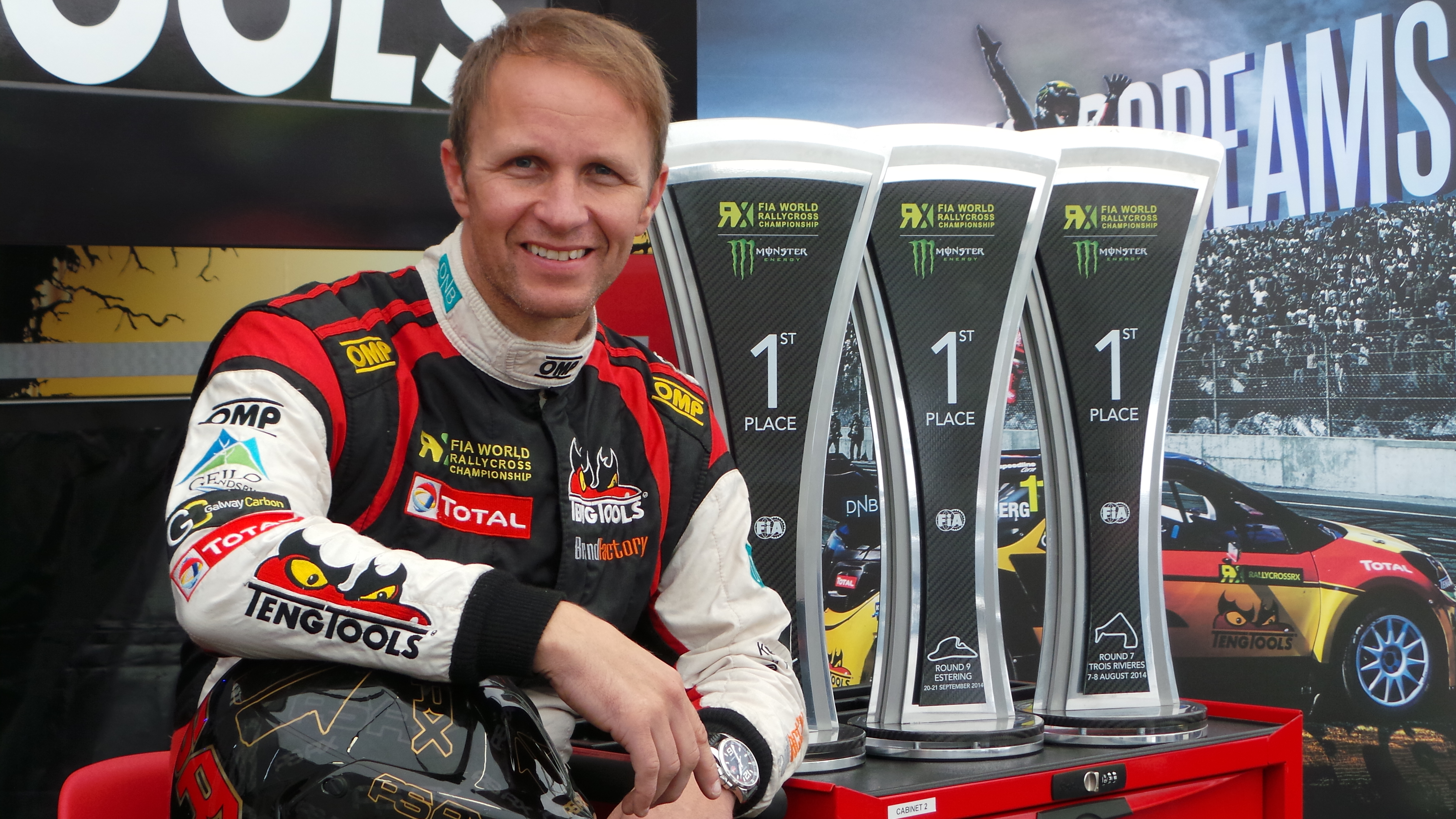
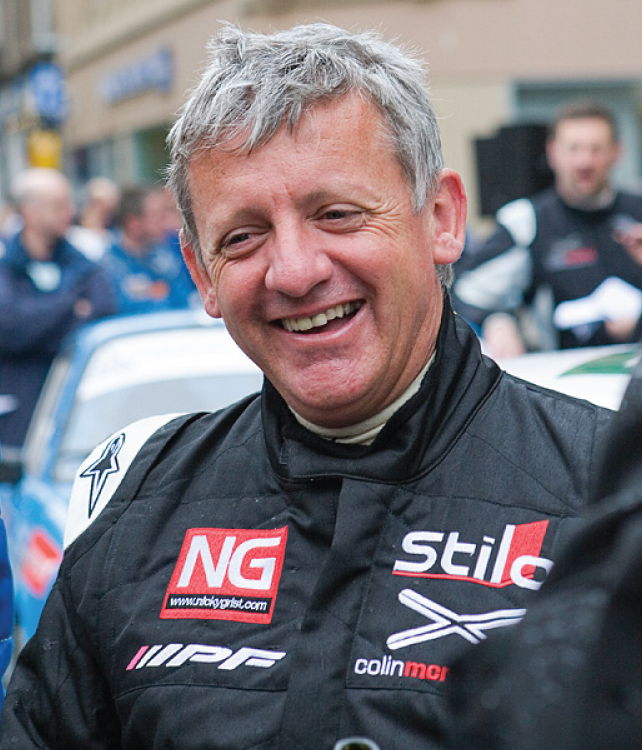
Rally drivers Kris Meeke (top) and Petter Solberg (middle) were consulted on the game's handling model, whilst former WRC co-driver Nicky Grist (bottom) lent his voice and likeness as one of the default co-drivers (alongside Jen Horsey).

Dirt 4 was developed by UK-based video game company Codemasters. Codemasters consulted with rally drivers Kris Meeke and Petter Solberg on the game's handling model. The game features co-driver and commentator voice work from professional co-drivers Nicky Grist and Jen Horsey.

The developers created DiRT 4's realistic audio by recording engine, intake, exhaust, transmission, and cabin noise. To capture proper on- and off-throttle for the full rev range of the engine, they recorded cars on-track rather than on a dyno. The audio model used a loop and grain approach, employing Wwise middleware to implement sounds into the game. Codemasters had recorded 200 cars from 2009 up to this game. Other recorded sounds include rolling surface, gravel kick-up, spring and damper compression, crowds, impacts, weather, and ambient.

Dirt 4 was released on PlayStation 4, Windows, and Xbox One on 6 June 2017 in North America, and on 9 June in European regions. The Linux and macOS versions were launched by Feral Interactive in March 2019.

== Reception ==
Reception

Aggregate score
Aggregator	Score
Metacritic	PC: 78/100; PS4: 85/100; XONE: 86/100

Review scores
Publication	Score
Destructoid	7.5/10
Game Informer	9/10
GameSpot	9/10
GamesRadar+	3.5/5
IGN	9.2/10
PC Gamer (US)	70/100
Polygon	9/10

Dirt 4 received "generally favorable" reviews from critics, according to video game review aggregator Metacritic. IGN gave the game a 9.2/10: "Accessible yet tough and grimy yet gorgeous, Dirt 4 sets a new standard in rally racing – and its well-considered career mode and endless stages inject it with tremendous stamina. Absolutely stonking brilliant". Polygon gave the game a 9/10: "I've never been more charmed by a racing video game and I could not recommend any other more than Dirt 4, to anyone of any ability. Dirt 4 is a joy". GameSpot awarded the game a 9/10 and said "if Dirt Rally's punishing difficulty alienated long-time series fans in any way, this commitment to accessibility should help to bring them back, and the near-infinite possibilities of Your Stage should keep them playing. Dirt 4 is a shining example of Codemasters at their brilliant best".

The game reached number 2 in the UK sales charts in its week of release, only behind Grand Theft Auto V. The game reached number 7 in Australia, and number 2 in New Zealand.

=== Accolades ===
The game was nominated for "Best Racing Game" in IGN's Best of 2017 Awards. It won the award for the same "Best Racing Game" category in Game Informer's Best of 2017 Awards and their 2017 Sports Game of the Year Awards, and in their Reader's Choice Best of 2017 Awards, it came in fourth place for the same category with only 12.5% of the votes. Polygon ranked the game 28th on their list of the 50 best games of 2017. It was also nominated for "Racing Game of the Year" at the 21st Annual D.I.C.E. Awards, and for "Game, Franchise Racing" and "Sound Effects" at the 17th Annual National Academy of Video Game Trade Reviewers Awards.
