= Onrush =

2018 racing video game

- Developer: Codemasters Evo
- Publisher: Deep Silver
- Director: Paul Rustchynsky
- Platforms: PlayStation 4, Xbox One
- Release: 5 June 2018
- Genre: Racing
- Modes: Single-player, multiplayer

Onrush (stylised as ONRUSH) is a 2018 racing video game developed by Codemasters and published by Deep Silver for the PlayStation 4 and Xbox One. Online servers officially shut down on 30 November 2022.

== Gameplay ==
Onrush is an arcade-style vehicular combat game in which players drive a variety of off-road vehicles, from motorcycles to buggies, across large levels over hilly terrain. The game features a boost mechanic that players can use to increase their vehicle's speed. Players earn boost by performing stunts and slamming rival racers to take them out. The game itself is a team game; twelve players are split into two teams of six.

In a significant departure from other games in the racing genre, none of the game modes involve reaching the finish line first. In "Overdrive", teams score points by boosting; the first team to boost enough to reach the target score wins. "Countdown" involves a series of checkpoints and a timer that drains over time; teams can keep the timer from running out by successfully passing the checkpoints, and if either team's timer ever hits zero, the other team scores a point. "Lockdown" is a King of the Hill-style mode in which teams fight to stay inside a zone that moves along the track with them for points. "Switch" gives each member of each team three lives and tasks the teams with taking each other down to win, but upon crashing, players will respawn in a more powerful vehicle if they have lives left.

== Development ==
Onrush was developed by Codemasters Evo, a team largely made up of former employees of Evolution Studios, which was shut down by Sony Interactive Entertainment in 2016 despite actively working on games.

With the game the studio wanted to answer the question "How do we keep everyone in the action all of time" the solution the team came up with was a gameplay system dubbed "The Stampede" by which players are respawned near the other players at all times creating a pack of cars traveling together. The team took inspiration from a variety of genres including, sports, shooters and fighting games. The latter influenced the team due to its possession of "fast flowing rounds that seamlessly roll into the next one and give players the opportunity for a comeback if their first round didn't go so well". The game Rocket League was also a notable influence on the team.

Due to the nature of the gameplay the team was nervous about pitching the game to Codemasters, although they were receptive and asked them to proceed with a prototype. Within the development team themselves there was some concern about the decision to stray from the established racing formula however at this point the mechanics specifically the "stampede" did not lend itself well to such a change. For game modes the team came up with 50 possible modes from which they prototyped twelve and eventually whittled down to only four. The remaining modes were chosen because "played to the strengths of Onrush and the Stampede system".

Onrush was announced in October 2017 during Paris Games Week. The game was published by Deep Silver and was released on 5 June 2018 for PlayStation 4 and Xbox One. Prior to its release a public beta was available for console players running from 17 May to the 21st with players who preordered getting access to it for an extra 48 hours prior. Although a version for Windows was announced, though as of April 2025 it has not been released, and the digital console versions have been delisted.

== Reception ==
Reception

Aggregate score
Aggregator	Score
Metacritic	PS4: 75/100; XONE: 77/100

Review scores
Publication	Score
Destructoid	8/10
Eurogamer	Recommended
GameRevolution	6/10
GameSpot	9/10
GameZone	3.5/5
Hardcore Gamer	4/5
IGN	8.2/10
USgamer	4/5

The game was received well by critics, generating scores of 75/100 and 77/100 for the PlayStation 4 and Xbox One versions respectively on reviews aggregation website Metacritic. Despite the critical response, the game sold poorly, which contributed to a series to layoffs at Codemasters, including game director Paul Rustchynsky.

The game was nominated for "Best Audio Design" at The Independent Game Developers' Association Awards 2018, and won the award for "Game, Original Racing" at the National Academy of Video Game Trade Reviewers Awards. It was also nominated for "Best Racing Game" at The Independent Game Developers' Association Awards 2019.
