= Dirt: Showdown =

2012 video game

DiRT: Showdown
- Cover art featuring Ken Block's Ford Fiesta Gymkhana 3
- Developer: Codemasters
- Publishers: Codemasters; Sega (Arcade)
- Series: Dirt
- Engine: Ego
- Platforms: PlayStation 3; Xbox 360; Microsoft Windows; Arcade; OS X; Linux
- Release: PlayStation 3, Xbox 360: EU: 25 May 2012; NA: 12 June 2012; Microsoft Windows: EU: 31 May 2012; NA: 23 May 2012; OS X: WW: 5 September 2014; Linux: WW: 17 August 2015
- Genres: Racing, vehicular combat
- Modes: Single-player, multiplayer

Dirt: Showdown (stylised as DiRT: Showdown; also known in the Arcade version as Showdown) is an arcade racing video game developed and published by Codemasters for Microsoft Windows, OS X, Xbox 360, PlayStation 3, and Linux. It was released on 25 May 2012 in Europe and on 12 June in North America. The OS X version was released on 4 September 2014 in North America. The game was released for Linux on 17 August 2015. The game was also released on Xbox 360 for free as part of Microsoft's Games with Gold promotion from 1 to 15 January January 2016. The game's online servers were shut down on 16 March 2026.

== Gameplay ==
The player is entered in a series of "Tour" events, offering a range of races and tournaments to compete in. Winning these events gives the player prize money, which can be spent buying new cars or upgrading existing ones, and unlocks further races. Upon the successful completion of the series final, the next difficulty setting is unlocked, featuring faster opponents and longer races.

== Development ==
The first trailer was released on YouTube on in December 2011. The soundtrack in the trailer was "Earthquake" by Labrinth.

The official gameplay trailer featured the song "Mother of Girl" by Eighteen Nightmares at the Lux. This song is also the lead track in the game.

== Reception ==
Reception

Aggregate score
Aggregator	Score
Metacritic	PC: 72/100; X360: 75/100; PS3: 75/100

Review scores
Publication	Score
Eurogamer	8/10
GameSpot	8/10
GamesRadar+	3.5/5
IGN	6/10
PC Gamer (UK)	79/100
Play	84%
Polygon	6/10
Push Square	8/10

The game has received mixed reviews, gaining an average review score of 72% on Metacritic.

GameSpy wrote: "Dirt: Showdown delivers bargain-basement entertainment value for the high, high price of $50. With its neutered physics, limited driving venues, clunky multiplayer, and diminished off-road racing options, discerning arcade racing fans should just write this one off as an unanticipated pothole in Codemaster's trailblazing Dirt series".

PC Gamer wrote: "Dirt: Showdown provides thrills while it lasts, but afterwards you're left wanting the deeper experience of its parents".

== See also ==
- Ambisonics, the audio technology used
