= Colin McRae: Dirt =

2007 video game

- European cover art featuring Toyota Celica Pikes Peak
- Developer: Codemasters
- Publisher: Codemasters
- Producer: Clive Moody; Alex Grimbley
- Designers: Matthew Horsman; Brian Coller; Jamie Adamson
- Series: Dirt
- Engine: Neon
- Platforms: Microsoft Windows; Xbox 360; PlayStation 3 Java ME
- Release: Windows, Xbox 360: EU: 15 June 2007; NA: 19 June 2007; AU: 29 June 2007; PlayStation 3: NA: 11 September 2007; EU: 14 September 2007; AU: 27 September 2007; Java ME: EU: Early 2008
- Genre: Racing
- Modes: Single-player, Multiplayer

Colin McRae: Dirt (stylised as Colin McRae: DiRT) is a simcade racing video game developed and published by Codemasters for Microsoft Windows, Xbox 360 and PlayStation 3. It is the last of the series to be published before Colin McRae's death. It features new graphics, audio, physics engine, new vehicles and a new game engine called Neon which was co-developed between Codemasters and Sony Computer Entertainment. The game features a variety of off-road racing categories as well as World Rally Championship style events. The game was released for the PlayStation 3 in Europe on 14 September 2007, a day prior to Colin McRae's death. The sequel, Colin McRae: Dirt 2, was released in September 2009. A simplified version of the game was developed by Glu Mobile and released for Java ME devices in 2008.

== Gameplay ==
A player driving in a rally

The single player game plays out through three modes. Career, Championship, and Rally World, which is a single race set up.

The Career mode is set up in a stylized pyramid that has 11 "tiers", with the bottom tier having 11 different events. Each event consists of one or more race events of a single type requiring a specific type of car. The player earns up to 10 points for their placing in all the races within the event. Most events require a specific number of points within a specific tier to unlock, and thus as the player earns points, more of the pyramid becomes unlocked, moving up to the "Champion of Champions" event at the very top. By winning races and earning money the player is able to purchase cars and liveries (skins) for the cars. In total there are 46 different cars and 186 liveries. The amount of money earned is based on the difficulty level picked by the player when selecting the event; higher difficulty levels have more challenging AI opponents and more realistic damage effects. Completed events can be repeated at any time, although unless challenged at a higher difficulty level, the player will earn significantly less money than when they first raced it. In Rally events with multiple races, the player has the opportunity to repair damage between races, but is only allotted 60 minutes of damage repair at each point based on time estimates to fix each component of the car.

Championship mode offers up a series of races in which the player's combined time throughout each stage is cumulative.

Multiplayer allows the player to race up to 100 other players in rally races through solo competition, as there are no other cars, ghosts or players present on the track. Fastest time determines who wins.

== Release ==
Colin McRae: Dirt was released on 15 June 2007 in Europe and on 19 June in North America for the Xbox 360 and PC. The PlayStation 3 version was released on 11 September in North America and on 14 September in Europe, the day before a helicopter crash claimed the life of McRae, his son Johnny, and two other people who were family friends of the McRaes. In response to the death and after an agreement was made with the McRae family, Codemasters withdrew a major advertising campaign for the PlayStation 3 version of Colin McRae: Dirt. as well as opting to remove Colin McRae's name from future titles in the series and re-releases of past entries. An adaptation of the game for mobile devices was published by Glu Mobile and released in Europe in the first quarter of 2008.

== Reception ==
Reception

Aggregate scores
Aggregator	Score		
Aggregator	PC	PS3	Xbox 360
GameRankings	84.36%	83.17%	83.49%
Metacritic	84/100	83/100	83/100

Review scores
Publication	Score		
Publication	PC	PS3	Xbox 360
Edge	N/A	N/A	8/10
Electronic Gaming Monthly	N/A	N/A	8.17/10
Eurogamer	N/A	8/10	8/10
Game Informer	N/A	8/10	8/10
GamePro	N/A	4/5	4.25/5
GameRevolution	B+	B+	B
GameSpot	8.3/10	8.5/10	8.3/10
GameSpy	4/5	4/5	4/5
GameTrailers	N/A	N/A	8.7/10
GameZone	N/A	8/10	8.5/10
IGN	8.4/10	8.4/10	(UK) 9/10 (US) 8.4/10
Official Xbox Magazine (US)	N/A	N/A	9/10
PC Gamer (US)	82%	N/A	N/A
PlayStation: The Official Magazine	N/A	8.5/10	N/A
Digital Spy	N/A	N/A	4/5

Colin McRae: Dirt was met with positive reception. It has a score of 84% and 84 out of 100 for the PC version, 84% and 83 out of 100 for the Xbox 360 version, and 83% and 83 out of 100 for the PlayStation 3 version according to GameRankings and Metacritic.

500,000 copies were sold worldwide in the first week of release. The game was selected as part of Gaming Target's year-end "52 Games We'll Still Be Playing From 2007" list.

During the 11th Annual Interactive Achievement Awards, the Academy of Interactive Arts & Sciences nominated Colin McRae: Dirt for "Racing Game of the Year".
