= Pacenotes =

Method of accurately describing a rallying route

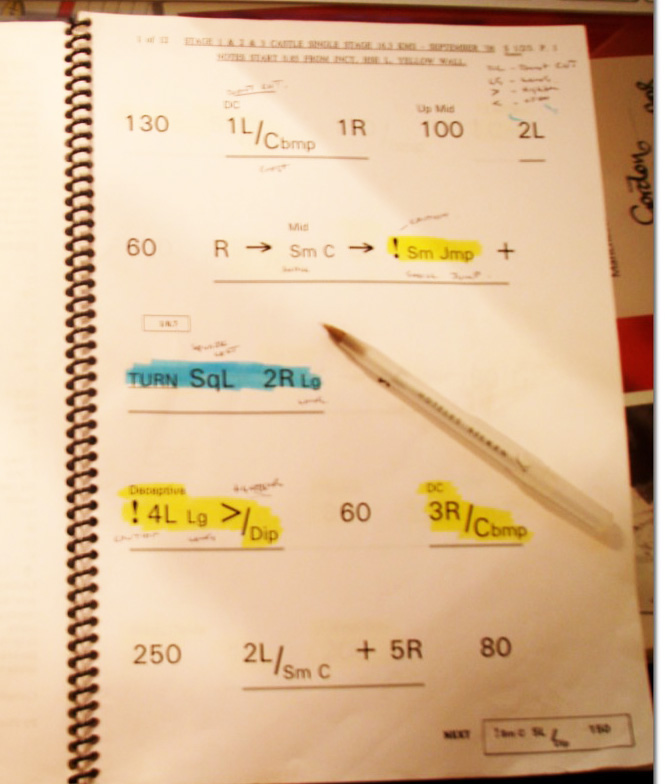
Pacenotes for a rally

In rallying, pacenotes are a commonly used method of accurately describing a rallying route to be driven in extreme detail. As well as dictating the general route to be taken, in terms of turnings, junctions, etc., all notable features of the route which might affect the way it is driven at speed are included. These details include the distance between each feature, the degree and severity of bends, adverse camber, crests and hill jumpings, surface type and conditions, potholes, special instructions to the driver, etc.

In order that the sheer quantity of detail is useful to a rally team, pacenotes are written in a tight shorthand which is read out loud by the navigator (usually called "co-driver") to the driver en route. A number of systems have been devised, and there is no one "standard" for pacenotes, but in practice a number of typical de facto standards are usually used. Other variations include the preferred language of the team, metric or imperial measurements, etc. Pacenotes for a typical world-class rally stage might run to many pages, and the road book for the event might be several thick bound volumes.

On some events, the organisers provide an official set of pacenotes, and often the rules ban reconnaissance (recce), meaning these notes are the only ones to be used. Other events permit crews to use any notes, either supplied to them by others or those they have compiled themselves. Compilation of notes requires access to the course ahead of the event, which is not always possible.

== History ==
The creation and use of pacenotes are associated with two wins of Mercedes-Benz at long distance road racing events. Karl Kling/Hans Klenk won the 1952 Carrera Panamericana despite having less power than the later roadgoing fuel-injected Mercedes-Benz 300 SL and getting hit by a vulture that smashed the windscreen. The 1955 Mille Miglia was won by Stirling Moss driving a Mercedes-Benz 300 SLR with support by journalist Denis Jenkinson while others drove solo.

== Typical notes ==
The following explanations apply to a typical set of hypothetical notes, and may differ from the systems found in real notes.

Example notes, distances in metres:

"MC1 100 KL2 100 KR2 200 SQL 100 KR4 50J!→R2+ (D/C!) 100 +SQR 400 F→CR→KL4 100 MC2BC"

Translation:

- From main control 1 (start), 100 metres straight to a kink left, severity 2
- 100 metres, kink right severity 2
- 200 m, square (90°) left
- 100 m, kink right severity 4
- 50 m, jump (caution!) into immediate right hand bend severity 2 tightens (caution, do not cut the corner, due to hazard on the inside)
- 100 m, oversquare (over 90°) right
- 400 m, flat (maximum speed) into crest into kink left severity 4
- 100 m to main control 2 (finish).

This system uses numbers to describe the severity of bends, which is common, though others are used. The "British Club" note system ranks turns with 1 being the gentlest of bends, and with 5 being almost 90 degrees. The "McRae in Gear" system ranks turns with 6 being almost a straight line, and 1 being a hairpin turn. A similar numbering may also be used to denote the gear in which the corner is to be taken. The term "square" is used to indicate a genuinely 90 degree bend, and "oversquare" or "square plus" for even sharper. "Hairpin" is used for 180 degree bends or almost as much. Crews will agree a system such that the speed at which a bend can be safely negotiated is understood. A top rally driver will implicitly trust their co-driver, and be fully committed according to the information they are told. Good notes and good teamwork are essential for this approach to work.

Unusual features such as a ford or grid might be written out in full, rather than in shorthand. Other symbols that are not strictly text are also used, such as a pair of narrowing lines to indicate that the route narrows. Crests and bridges are also often indicated symbolically.

When pacenotes are read, the co-driver will not translate into the fully worded text given above, but instead will keep some abbreviations, such as 'K' for a bend or kink. Distances are just given, the units are understood. The above notes might be read as:

100 K left 2, 100 K right 2, 200 square left, 100 K right 4, 50 caution jump into right 2 tightens, don't cut, 100 oversquare right, 400 flat to crest into K left 4, 100 finish.

The co-driver will read the notes at such a pace that the driver will always have enough to go on, but not so far ahead that they will have forgotten it by the time the feature is encountered. This pacing is something that comes with practice and development of teamwork. Often the co-driver will need to "get inside the driver's head", and re-read notes that they think might have been forgotten, or for emphasis. Sometimes the driver might even ask for some notes again. The co-driver must also match up the notes to the actuality of the route being driven. Re-synching the notes with the actual route after a loss can be tricky, depending on the terrain. A good co-driver will always seek to prevent this happening.

Aids to accurate use of notes such as a calibrated odometer that can be controlled by the co-driver quickly are also often used. These have a large digital display of the distance travelled, and can be preset to give a countdown of the distance to the next feature.
