= Co-driver =

Navigator in motor rallying

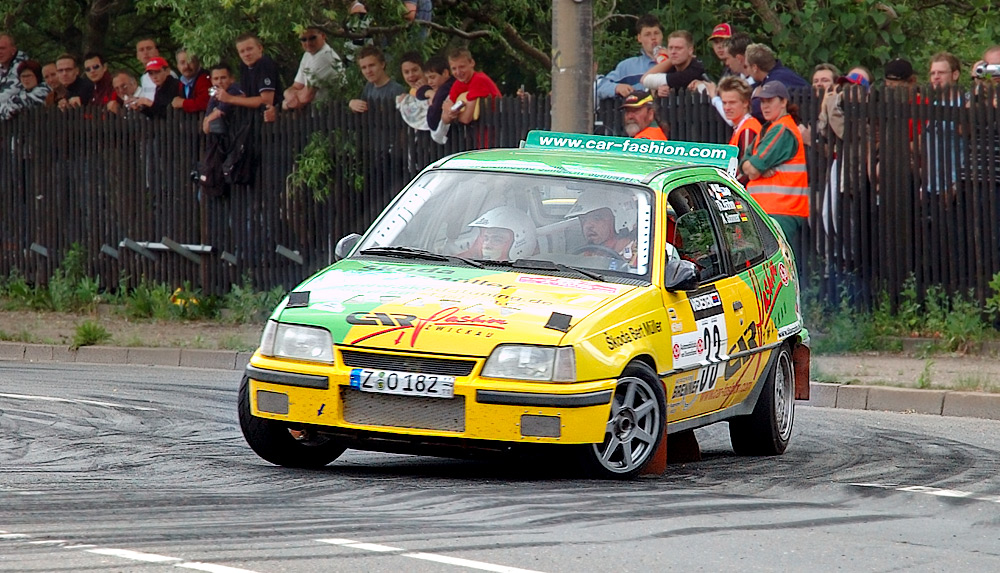
The co-driver is seated lower in the car to improve weight distribution.

A co-driver is the navigator of a rally car in the sport of rallying, who sits in the front passenger seat. The co-driver's job is to navigate, commonly by reading off a set of pacenotes to the driver (what lies ahead, where to turn, the severity of the turn, and what obstacles to look out for). Some competitions require map interpretation. In stage rallying communication is often over a radio headset, due to the high level of noise in the car. The co-driver also tells the driver about any incidents or accidents that may have occurred further ahead in the stage. This role is particularly critical in high-end rally competitions such as WRC. Co-drivers are also often called on to perform maintenance on the car during road sections and special stages, such as changing a wheel.

== Notable co-drivers ==
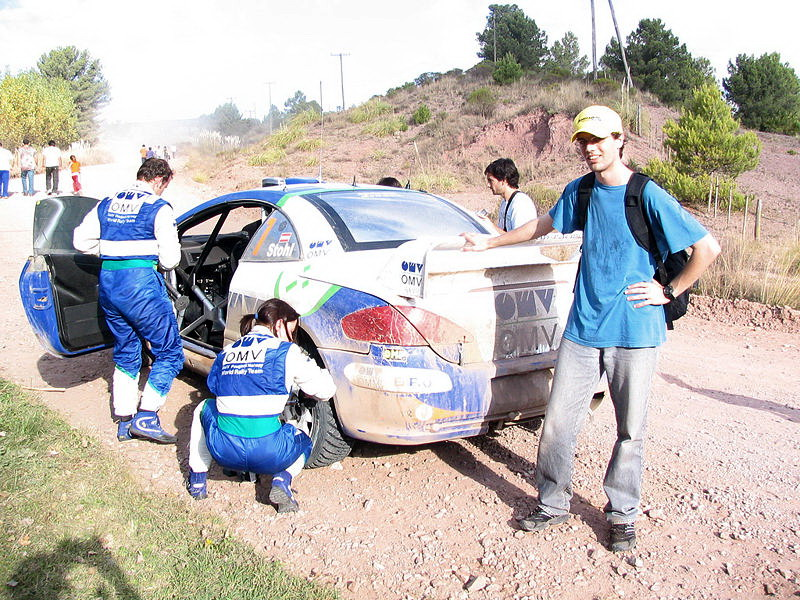
Manfred Stohl and co-driver Ilka Minor changing a tire on a road section of Rally Argentina.

- "Biche"
- Björn Cederberg
- Sergio Cresto
- Mike Doughty
- Daniel Elena
- Ola Fløene
- Fred Gallagher
- Isabelle Galmiche
- Christian Geistdörfer
- Ana Goñi
- Nicky Grist
- Seppo Harjanne
- Arne Hertz
- Julien Ingrassia
- Denis Jenkinson
- Martin Järveoja
- Jarmo Lehtinen
- Lee McKenzie
- Gino Macaluso
- Risto Mannisenmäki
- Tony Mason
- Phil Mills
- Luis Moya
- Michael Park
- Maurizio Perissinot
- Fabrizia Pons
- Timo Rautiainen
- Robert Reid
- Nathalie Richard
- David Richards
- Derek Ringer
- Tiziano Siviero
- Tina Thörner
- Jean Todt

== See also ==
- Riding mechanic
