= Forza Motorsport 2 =

2007 video game

- Cover art featuring a tuned Nissan 350Z drifting
- Developer: Turn 10 Studios
- Publisher: Microsoft Game Studios
- Series: Forza
- Platform: Xbox 360
- Release: NA: May 29, 2007; EU: June 8, 2007; AU: June 14, 2007
- Genre: Racing
- Modes: Single-player, multiplayer

Forza Motorsport 2 is a 2007 simulation racing video game developed by Turn 10 Studios for the Xbox 360 console. It is the second title in the Forza series, and is the sequel to the original Forza Motorsport (2005) and was followed by Forza Motorsport 3 (2009).

== Gameplay ==
Forza Motorsport 2 features real-world cars and locations, such as this race in the Ford GT at Laguna Seca.

Forza Motorsport 2 is a simulation racing video game on the Xbox 360 and the sequel to Forza Motorsport, which was released for the Xbox in 2005. Players compete in events around the globe using real licensed cars on a variety of real-world and fictional courses. It features an arcade mode, meant more for quickplay of races, and a career mode, which is focused on long-term play. Career mode spans several racing disciplines. Players can drive anything from common commuter cars to rare and expensive cars such as the Super GT and Deutsche Tourenwagen Masters vehicles. The game supports split-screen, System Link and Xbox Live multiplayer gaming. Split-screen allows two-player head-to-head racing, while both System Link and Xbox Live allow up to eight players to participate in a single race. Using Xbox Live, players can also buy in-game cars through the game's auction house, sell and 'gift' cars.

Most cars in Forza 2 can be visually customized with both aerodynamic parts as well as graphics. In Forza, 600 layers of graphics could be used to customize the exterior of your vehicle; however, in Forza 2, 4,000 layers of graphics can be created with the livery editor to draw shapes, letters and pictures onto a car. Paint schemes can be auctioned online to other players for in-game credits. Many players reproduced paint schemes appeared in real world, or creating Itashas through this system. There are 349 cars available (including downloadable content) in Forza Motorsport 2. They are divided into six production classes and four race classes. A car's class can limit races for which it is eligible. The final list of cars was revealed on April 20, 2007. Famous racing car drivers from racing series such as Deutsche Tourenwagen Masters, Formula One and Le Mans Series will appear in exhibition races if the player selects racing cars for the race. Some drivers include Allan McNish, Pedro Lamy, Johnny Herbert, Max Papis, Kamui Kobayashi, Satoshi Motoyama, Yuji Ide, Teppei Natori, Tommy Archer, Seiji Ara, Masahiko Kageyama, Alain Menu, Luc Alphand and Christophe Bouchut. Developers of the Forza series also appear in certain races, such as Dan Greenawalt and Michael Caviezel.

Forza Motorsport 2 concentrates on circuit racing; point to point races which were featured in the original Forza Motorsport have been removed. Real world tracks Road Atlanta, Silverstone, Laguna Seca, Tsukuba, Mugello Circuit, Sebring International Raceway, Suzuka Circuit, and Nürburgring Nordschleife are licensed and included. Forza 2 is also one of the first racing games to prominently feature cars from the American Le Mans Series in both the game and downloadable content.

The damage and physics in the game have been revamped over the previous game, allowing for multiple settings: "simulation," which is the most severe, allowing for damage that can take a car out of commission; "limited," which scales down the severity of impact of crashes; and "cosmetic," where the damage is merely visual. The damage ratings for each part of the vehicle can be seen on the HUD (heads up display) accessed from the in-game menu. New for Forza 2 are scoreboards similar to those found in Halo 2. Each user can log into the official website for Forza 2 using their Xbox Live account. In addition to leaderboards, features included are online auctions for in-game cars. Cars purchased through auctions will come with all statistics related to that car such as mileage, total repair cost incurred, number of previous owners, etc. Other features include tournament scheduling and the ability to take in-game photos and upload to and view five at a time on the Forza 2 website.

== Development and marketing ==
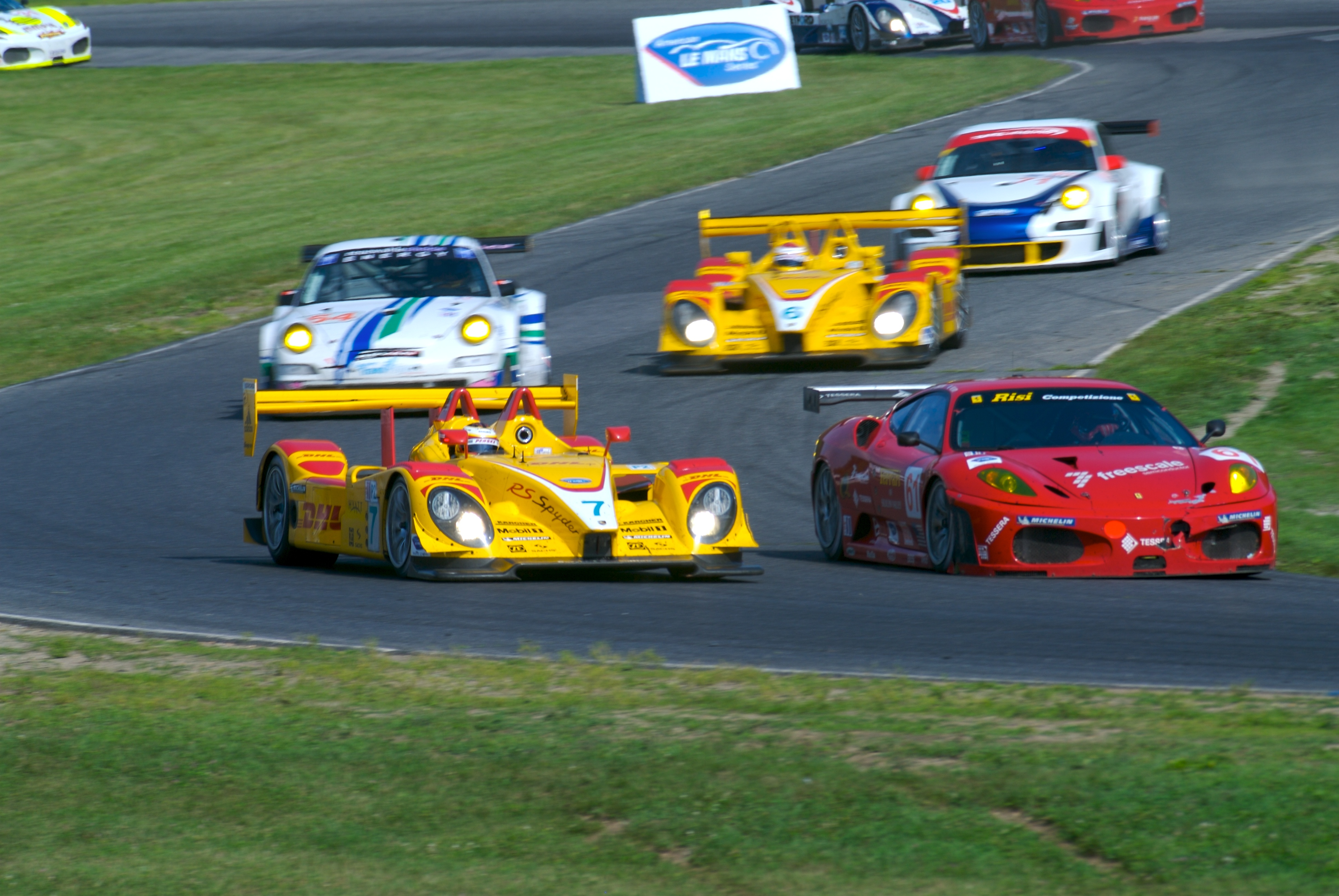
The American Le Mans series, seen here during Northeast Grand Prix 2007, was added for Forza Motorsport 2.

The Microsoft Xbox 360 Wireless Racing Wheel was developed in alongside Forza Motorsport 2 and is designed to work with the game. Professional racers playtested the wheel to aid the development in trying to achieve realistic features and settings. Forza Motorsport 2 features force feedback with the use of the Xbox 360 Wireless Racing Wheel. Forza 2 runs at 60 frames per second in 720p resolution (HD), with menus and replays running at 30 frames per second to accommodate additional after-effects for the latter.

The Forza Motorsport 2 audio team set out to create a more realistic soundtrack that improves gameplay, immerses the player, and changes with car customization. They recorded actual cars on dynos with an array of microphones. To implement the audio, they matched the sample loops to engine speeds and used DSP techniques to enhance the sound. Additional recording was done on turbochargers, superchargers, straight-cut gears, tires, and collisions.

On August 1, 2007, the first downloadable content for the game was released, the "Nissan Tournament Pack", free of charge. It featured three Nissan cars. A second downloadable content was also made available containing a paintable Peugeot 908 race car. On September 21, 2007, the "September Car Pack" was released, containing 11 individual cars. On October 26, 2007, the "Motegi Track Pack" was released, featuring a new downloadable track, Twin Ring Motegi. The track is playable in the form of four variations, including three road courses and an oval. On December 7, 2007, two packs of downloadable content were released, the first being the Road America track and the second being the "December Car Pack" featuring 11 cars. On March 19, 2008, the "March Car Pack" was made released, in the form of 13 individual cars. Download content for Forza Motorsport 2 is no longer supported.

Forza Motorsport 2 was released in three editions: the Regular edition, the Limited Collector's Edition and the Platinum Hits edition. The Limited Edition features a 157-page booklet containing insider details on the game as well as tips on how to obtain the game's Achievements. Car manufacturer detail is also provided along with three Limited Collector's Edition-exclusive cars. The three cars are the Subaru Impreza S204, Saleen S281E, and Challenge Stradale. Various online game stores also offered a bonus code to unlock the Nissan 350Z featured on promotional pictures with preorder purchase. The Limited Collector's Edition was available in Australia, Asia, Canada and Europe, but not in the United States. A special edition titled Forza Motorsport 2 Platinum Hits was released for the North American market on August 19, 2008. This edition includes a bonus disc containing the cars and tracks available as downloadable content at the time of its release, the cars of the Limited Collector's Edition and the Nissan 350Z originally offered as a preorder bonus.

== Reception ==
Reception

Aggregate score
Aggregator	Score
Metacritic	90/100

Review scores
Publication	Score
Edge	9/10
Electronic Gaming Monthly	8.67/10
Eurogamer	9/10
Famitsu	36/40
Game Informer	8.25/10
GamePro	4.5/5
GameSpot	9.2/10
GameSpy	5/5
GameTrailers	9.1/10
GameZone	9/10
IGN	(AU) 9.2/10 (US) 8.9/10
Official Xbox Magazine (US)	8.5/10
411Mania	9.6/10
USA Today	9/10

Forza Motorsport 2 received a Platinum sales award from the Entertainment and Leisure Software Publishers Association (ELSPA), indicating sales of at least 300,000 copies in the United Kingdom.

The game received "universal acclaim" reviews according to the review aggregation website Metacritic. In Japan, Famitsu gave it a score of all four nines for a total of 36 out of 40. In Australia, Hyper's Dirk Watch commended the game for its "excellent handling and fantastic customization." However, he noted that the game was "not particularly user friendly and feels almost identical to Forza".

During the 11th Annual Interactive Achievement Awards, Forza Motorsport 2 received nominations for "Racing Game of the Year" and "Outstanding Achievement in Online Gameplay" by the Academy of Interactive Arts & Sciences.
