= Forza Horizon 6 =

2026 video game

- Key art featuring a GR GT Prototype and a Toyota Land Cruiser 250 with Mount Fuji and Tokyo in the background
- Developer: Playground Games (Note: Assistance from Turn 10 Studios. PlayStation 5 versions by Panic Button.)
- Publisher: Xbox Game Studios
- Producer: Mike Bennett
- Designers: Torben Ellert; David Orton
- Programmers: Alan Roberts; David Waby
- Artist: Don Arceta
- Series: Forza
- Engine: ForzaTech
- Platforms: Windows; Xbox Series X/S; PlayStation 5
- Release: Windows, Xbox Series X/S; 19 May 2026 (Note: Users who purchased the Premium version received access on 15 May, four days earlier than the public release.); PlayStation 5; 26 January 2027 (Note: Users who purchased the Premium Flair version received access on 21 January, five days earlier than the public release, with accessible to expansion content on day-one with other platforms.)
- Genre: Racing
- Modes: Single-player, multiplayer

Forza Horizon 6 is a 2026 open world racing game developed by Playground Games and published by Xbox Game Studios. It is the sixth Forza Horizon title, following Forza Horizon 5, and the fourteenth main instalment in the Forza franchise. Set in a fictionalised representation of Japan, it features a stylised version of Tokyo as the game world's main city. It was released for Windows and Xbox Series X/S on 19 May 2026, and will be released for PlayStation 5 on 26 January 2027.

== Gameplay ==
An Acura NSX racing against Chaser Zero (the in game mecha) during the "Mech My Day" Showcase Event

Forza Horizon 6 is set in Japan. The game's open world map is the franchise's largest, with the Tokyo City area considered to be its "most complex and intricate drivable space". Similar to its two predecessors, the game features a dynamic weather system that reflects seasonal changes. Players begin as a tourist and must work their way up to qualify for the Horizon Festival, eventually rising through its ranks. The wristband progression system from Forza Horizon and Forza Horizon 2 returns. Players earn wristbands by completing races, events, and stunts, unlocking better and faster cars along the way. Reaching the gold wristband grants access to Legend Island, a special area featuring unique challenges, exclusive events and a second Horizon Festival Site.

The game launched with over 550 cars, a lot of which can be extensively customised. Players can store unlocked vehicles in one of eight garages which also serve as fast travel points. Additionally, players can unlock "the Estate", a customisable mountainside property in rural Japan which can be decorated with various items and objects. As players explore the open world, they can join events such as car meets, street racing, and touge battles. Players can also photograph points of interest, with these shots stored as stamps in a Collection Journal. "The Eliminator", a multiplayer battle royale game mode that first appeared in Forza Horizon 4, allows up to 72 players to face off against each other.

== Development ==
Forza Horizon 6 was developed by Playground Games with assistance from Turn 10 Studios, while Panic Button focusing the port development of PlayStation 5 version. In December 2025, it was reported that Turn 10 had ended work on supporting Forza Motorsport (2023) and had shifted its focus entirely to Forza Horizon 6. Turn 10 contributed help in polishing Forza Horizon 6 and their experience working on the more sim-racing focused Forza Motorsport series aided Playground Games in improving car detail and introducing new mechanics.

=== Setting ===
Japan was chosen as the game's setting due to its popularity among fans, who frequently requested it. Playground Games felt that Forza Horizon 6 was the right time to accurately represent Japan due to not feeling technical limitations would be an obstacle in that goal. In choosing Japan, art director Don Arceta noted its "unique culture" and that it is a location "full of contrast", with urban areas in the game juxtaposed against mountainous roads and open fields. Locations in the game experience seasonal changes that can have a "dramatic impact on the landscape and playable world" according to Arceta, including the cherry blossoms blooms during Sakura season to snowy winters. Seasonal changes also have cultural meaning in Japan. According to Arceta, the game's map is not a one-to-one recreation of Japan, much like with the maps of past entries' locations, as the team wanted to "capture the country's unique cultural essence" instead. The city of Tokyo was described as the "biggest urban area yet" in a Forza Horizon game, being five times larger than the urban areas in previous titles. Within Tokyo, there are distinct districts with their own identity and city landmarks such as Shibuya Crossing, Ginko Avenue, and Tokyo Tower are featured. Tokyo's urban areas vary in density from the neon-lit streets downtown to suburbs and industrial docklands. The team's prior experience developing the Hot Wheels expansion for Forza Horizon 5 also helped the team developing Tokyo's elevated highways.

Kyoko Yamashita was hired as a cultural consultant. The team travelled to Japan for location research with Yamashita where they witnessed Japanese car culture firsthand. Forza Horizon 6 represents Japanese car culture with urban street racing and Daikoku car meets.

=== Technology ===
Forza Horizon 6 was developed in Turn 10 Studios's in-house ForzaTech engine. It is the first Forza Horizon title developed exclusively for ninth-generation consoles. Playground Games credited leaving behind the eighth-generation Xbox One as enabling "more potential" in what they can do with post-launch live service releases. Forza Horizon 6 introduces a new ray-traced global illumination system for indirect lighting that is paired alongside traditional rasterised lighting and ray-traced reflections. The consoles forgo ray-traced environmental reflections for a mix of cube maps and screen-space reflections instead with the exception of self-reflections on cars that are ray-traced. A new refraction-based shader is included on car headlights and taillights to exhibit more authentic depth. Light cast from polycarbonate-style headlights, for example, is given a rainbow refraction effect.

Forza Horizon 6 features Quality and Performance graphics modes across both Xbox Series X and Series S consoles. Xbox Series X in its Quality mode is rendered at a native 4K resolution at 30 frames-per-second while the Performance mode targets 60 using dynamic resolution scaling from 1620p up to 2160p. Dynamic resolution scaling is used on both modes on the weaker Series S. Series S's Quality mode renders at 1440p at 30 frames per second while the Performance mode renders at 1080p at 60. Microsoft's Advanced Shader Delivery debuted on PC with certain GPUs from AMD—Radeon RX 7000 and RX 9000 series—in Forza Horizon 6, addressing shader compilation stutter and shortening loading times by delivering pre-compiled shaders with game downloads. According to Microsoft, Forza Horizon 6 sees a 95% reduction in loading time with Advanced Shader Delivery.

== Release ==
Revealed during the 2025 Tokyo Game Show, Forza Horizon 6 was confirmed to be launched on Windows and Xbox Series X/S on 19 May 2026 if the player has purchased the Standard or Deluxe edition or 15 May 2026 if the player has purchased the Premium edition; with a PlayStation 5 version releasing later in 26 January 2027 if the player has purchased the Standard or Deluxe edition or 21 January 2027 if the player has purchased the Premium Flair edition. It is made available to subscribers of select Xbox Game Pass plans on release day, including Xbox Game Pass Ultimate and PC Game Pass. The game was part of Xbox Developer Direct on 22 January 2026, with Playground Games debuting the first look of gameplay.

On 10 May 2026, nine days before the official release date and five days before the early access period started, it was reported that the game's 155 GB of files for pre-loading on Steam were accidentally left unencrypted. Normally the uploaded files would be encrypted until launch, but players were able to play the game unimpeded as a result of the error. The files were cracked by pirates and uploaded to file sharing websites. Playground Games acknowledged the leak in a Twitter post and issued bans for players who played the game through this method.

Following the release of the game, some players criticised the difficulty of the Drivatar system, even at lower difficulty levels. Playground Games subsequently addressed the issue, along with others, in a blog post. One Drivatar in particular, named "bowie knife99", became infamous for their erratic and aggressive behaviour, with some players fighting back against them. bowie knife99 went on to become an internet meme, being referenced in tweets from companies such as Xbox themselves to Major League Baseball.

=== Promotion ===
On 20 April 2026, a limited edition Forza Horizon 6-themed Xbox Wireless Controller and Wireless Headset were announced with a 19 May release date alongside the game. The controller's colour scheme was inspired by the Horizon Festival with transparent cyan, volt green and hot pink accents.

Players can claim cars from previous Forza Horizon titles as rewards in Forza Horizon 6 if their Xbox Gamertag has played previous Forza Horizon titles. The cars are the 2021 Mercedes-AMG One from Forza Horizon 5, the 2016 Aston Martin Vulcan from Forza Horizon 4 (the McLaren Senna was not included due to licensing issues), the 2016 Lamborghini Centenario LP 770-4 from Forza Horizon 3, the 2014 Lamborghini Huracán LP 610-4 from Forza Horizon 2, and the 2013 Dodge SRT Viper GTS from Forza Horizon, as well as the 2024 Corvette E-Ray if their Gamertag has played Forza Motorsport (2023). From 7 to 31 May 2026, players with an active Crunchyroll subscription could claim a free Car Voucher code for use in Forza Horizon 6.

== Reception ==
=== Critical reception ===
Reception

Aggregate scores
Aggregator	Score
Metacritic	(PC): 90/100 (XSXS): 90/100
OpenCritic	100% recommend (Note: Based on 142 reviews)

Review scores
Publication	Score
Destructoid	9/10
Eurogamer	5/5
Game Informer	9.25/10
GameSpot	8/10
GamesRadar+	4/5
Giant Bomb	5/5
Hardcore Gamer	4.5/5
IGN	10/10
PC Gamer (US)	84/100
PCGamesN	9/10
Shacknews	9/10
TechRadar	4.5/5
Video Games Chronicle	5/5
Pure Xbox	9/10

Forza Horizon 6 received "universal acclaim", according to review aggregator website Metacritic. 100% of critics recommended the game, according to OpenCritic. PC Gamer was critical of the dialogue in cutscenes, describing it as "bland" and including "trite platitudes and empty positivity" that makes for a "peak second-screen" experience; GamesRadar+ was similarly critical of the "shallow" story.

Reviewers praised the game's Japan setting and open-world design, describing it as a strong showcase for the series' driving and exploration loop. Eurogamer's Dom Peppiatt commended Playground Games' recreation of Japan and its car culture, and wrote that the entry refined the formula established by earlier Forza Horizon games. Luke Reilly of IGN similarly praised the map as a playful open world for driving, while Video Games Chronicle's Chris Scullion considered it one of the racing genre's essential releases. Game Informer found exploration the most memorable part of the game, veering off from quest lines for discovering collectibles across the world.

Several critics highlighted the handling model, event variety, and progression systems as major strengths. GamesRadar+ praised the racing engine and Japan-set world, while noting that the game could feel conservative in its adherence to the established series structure. PCGamesN called the game a near-complete package, its progression system akin to the first Forza Horizon game. Shacknews emphasised the appeal of its touge-style driving events, while GamesRadar+ found online events to enrich the experience through unique races and group activities. Several other reviewers also responded positively to the game's execution of the series formula.

The Windows version was also well received, though some reviewers were more measured in their praise. TechRadar praised the game as a strong series entry and singled out one new feature as a particular improvement, but said players expecting a major overhaul of the series' progression and structure might find it familiar. PC Gamer also reviewed the Windows version positively, while giving it one of the lower scores among the listed publications.

=== Sales ===
A month before release, Forza Horizon 6 was reported to have sold over 500,000 copies via pre-orders on Steam, equating to nearly $30 million in gross revenue. In its early access period, Forza Horizon 6 hit 172,093 concurrent players on Steam, a record for the franchise, more than doubling Forza Horizon 5's peak. It reached 6 million players by 21 May, and 300,000 concurrent players on Steam by 24 May, causing it to be the 52nd highest all-time peak video game on Steam.

=== Awards ===
Year	Award	Category	Result	Ref.
2026	Golden Joystick Awards	Best Visual Design	Nominated	
2026	Golden Joystick Awards	Console Game of the Year	Nominated	
2026	Golden Joystick Awards	Ultimate Game of the Year	Nominated	
2026	The Game Awards 2026	Best Sports/Racing Game	Pending	
2026	The Game Awards 2026	Innovation in Accessibility	Pending	
