= Turn 10 Studios =

American video game developer

Playground Games Redmond
- Formerly: Turn 10 Studios (2001–2026)
- Type: Division
- Industry: Video games
- Founded: 2001; 25 years ago
- Headquarters: Redmond, Washington, US
- Key people: Dan Greenawalt (studio head)
- Products: Forza Motorsport series
- Number of employees: 100 (2014)
- Parent: Playground Games (2026–present)
- Website: turn10studios.com

Playground Games Redmond (formerly Turn 10 Studios) is an American video game developer based in Redmond, Washington. The company was established in 2001 under Microsoft Game Studios (now known as Xbox Game Studios) to develop the Forza Motorsport series for Xbox platforms.

The last game developed solely by Turn 10 is the eighth Forza Motorsport, released in 2023. Following the release of Forza Horizon 6 in May 2026, Turn 10 was merged into Playground Games and rebranded as Playground Games Redmond.

== History ==
Turn 10 Studios was established in 2001 by Microsoft, under its Microsoft Game Studios division, to develop a series of racing games, which later became known as Forza. Alan Hartman served as head of the studio. At the time of the studio's establishment, most staff had experience in publishing games, such as Project Gotham Racing and Golf 4.0, but had not been involved in game development.

In October 2014, the studio employed approximately 100 full-time staff, as well as between 100 and 200 contract workers. In 2023, Hartman was elevated to head of Xbox Games Studios. After releasing a new Forza Motorsport every two years since the first game, Turn 10 announced in 2019 that it would not be releasing a new entry that year. In 2023, the studio released Forza Motorsport as a reboot of the series.

In July 2025, 70 roles were eliminated as part of a round of layoffs that affected 9,000 Microsoft employees. It was also reported that development on the Forza Motorsport series had been cancelled and Turn 10 would continue working on the Forza Horizon series alongside Playground Games. Support for Forza Motorsport stopped at the end of the year, allowing Turn 10 to assist on Forza Horizon 6.

=== Merger with Playground Games ===
In September 2026, as part of a broader restructuring of Xbox Game Studios, Microsoft announced that Turn 10 Studios and Playground Games would merge into one studio. The combined studio would focus on the Forza and Fable franchises with two locations, Playground Games Leamington Spa and Playground Games Redmond.

Turn 10 studio head Dan Greenawalt announced his retirement in October 2026, following 27 years of working at Microsoft and Turn 10 Studios.

== Technology ==
Turn 10 develops and uses a proprietary game engine called ForzaTech, and proprietary editor called Fuel that allows multiple artists to work on the same level, primarily those for cars and racing tracks, simultaneously.

== Games developed ==
| Year | Title | Platform(s) |
|---|---|---|
| 2005 | Forza Motorsport | Xbox |
| 2007 | Forza Motorsport 2 | Xbox 360 |
| 2009 | Forza Motorsport 3 | Xbox 360 |
| 2011 | Forza Motorsport 4 | Xbox 360 |
| 2013 | Forza Motorsport 5 | Xbox One |
| 2015 | Forza Motorsport 6 | Xbox One |
| 2016 | Forza Motorsport 6: Apex | Microsoft Windows |
| 2017 | Forza Motorsport 7 | Microsoft Windows, Xbox One |
| 2023 | Forza Motorsport | Microsoft Windows, Xbox Series X/S |
