= Forza Motorsport 6 =

2015 video game

- Cover art featuring the 2017 Ford GT
- Developer: Turn 10 Studios
- Publisher: Microsoft Studios
- Directors: William Giese; Dan Greenawalt
- Producers: Ryan B. Cooper; Trevor Laupmanis
- Designer: Andy Beaudoin
- Artist: Timothy Dean
- Series: Forza
- Platforms: Xbox One; Windows (Apex)
- Release: Xbox One: NA/AU: September 15, 2015; EU: September 18, 2015; Windows: WW: September 6, 2016; (Apex)
- Genre: Racing
- Modes: Single-player, multiplayer

Forza Motorsport 6 is a 2015 racing video game developed by Turn 10 Studios and published by Microsoft Studios for the Xbox One. It is the sixth Forza Motorsport and eighth overall installment in the Forza series, and available worldwide on September 15, 2015. Forza Motorsport 6: Apex, a free-to-play version for Windows 10, was released on September 6, 2016, thus making the first Forza title to be released for Windows.

Forza Motorsport 6 features new gameplay elements, such as rain and night racing returned from Forza Motorsport. Also featured, is a new story mode called "Stories of Motorsport", which offers approximately 70 hours of gameplay. Forza Motorsport 6 features more than 450 cars, more than twice the number of cars in Forza Motorsport 5, and 27 tracks in all, of which seven are new to this game.

First revealed during the North American International Auto Show in Detroit, Michigan on January 12, 2015, Turn 10 continued to partner with BBC automotive series Top Gear, and features the show's test track at Dunsfold Aerodrome. Turn 10 also partnered with Ford Motor Company, the manufacturer of the 2017 Ford GT cover car.

Upon release, Forza Motorsport 6 received generally positive reviews, with critics agreeing it to be an improvement over its predecessor and praising the game's visuals, gameplay and game modes.

It was succeeded by Forza Motorsport 7 in October 2017.

== Gameplay ==
Forza Motorsport 6 features racing in rainy conditions on several tracks.

Forza Motorsport 6 is a racing video game which allows the player to race many vehicles across different racing disciplines and courses. Vehicle handling is simulation-based, meaning that each vehicle behaves as closely to its real-world counterpart as possible. Courses are primarily digital representations of real tracks, with 22 tracks based on real locations, and four being fictional. Races consist of up to 24 vehicles competing, and weather elements such as rain can affect vehicle handling.

Players can compete in various championships, which are divided based on vehicle manufacturer region, vehicle age, power, drivetrain, racing discipline, and other categories. Each championship consists of multiple races. Additionally exhibition races can be run, which are single events. Awards are generally better with championship races, while exhibitions require less of a time commitment from the player. The game offers both split-screen multiplayer and online play through Xbox Live.

Several downloadable content expansion packs have been released during the game's life cycle. Monthly car packs were released through August 2016, each featuring seven cars. A 10 car expansion featuring cars from The Fast and the Furious franchise was made available on September 15, 2015. Two major expansions, the Porsche expansion pack and the NASCAR expansion pack, featured both cars and an additional track. The NASCAR expansion also featured a racing campaign for players to complete. Other promotional cars were released in conjunction with other releases. Examples include the 2069 Chryslus Rocket, which was featured in Fallout 4 and Dominic Toretto's 1970 Dodge Charger, which coincided with the release of Furious 7.

== Development and marketing ==
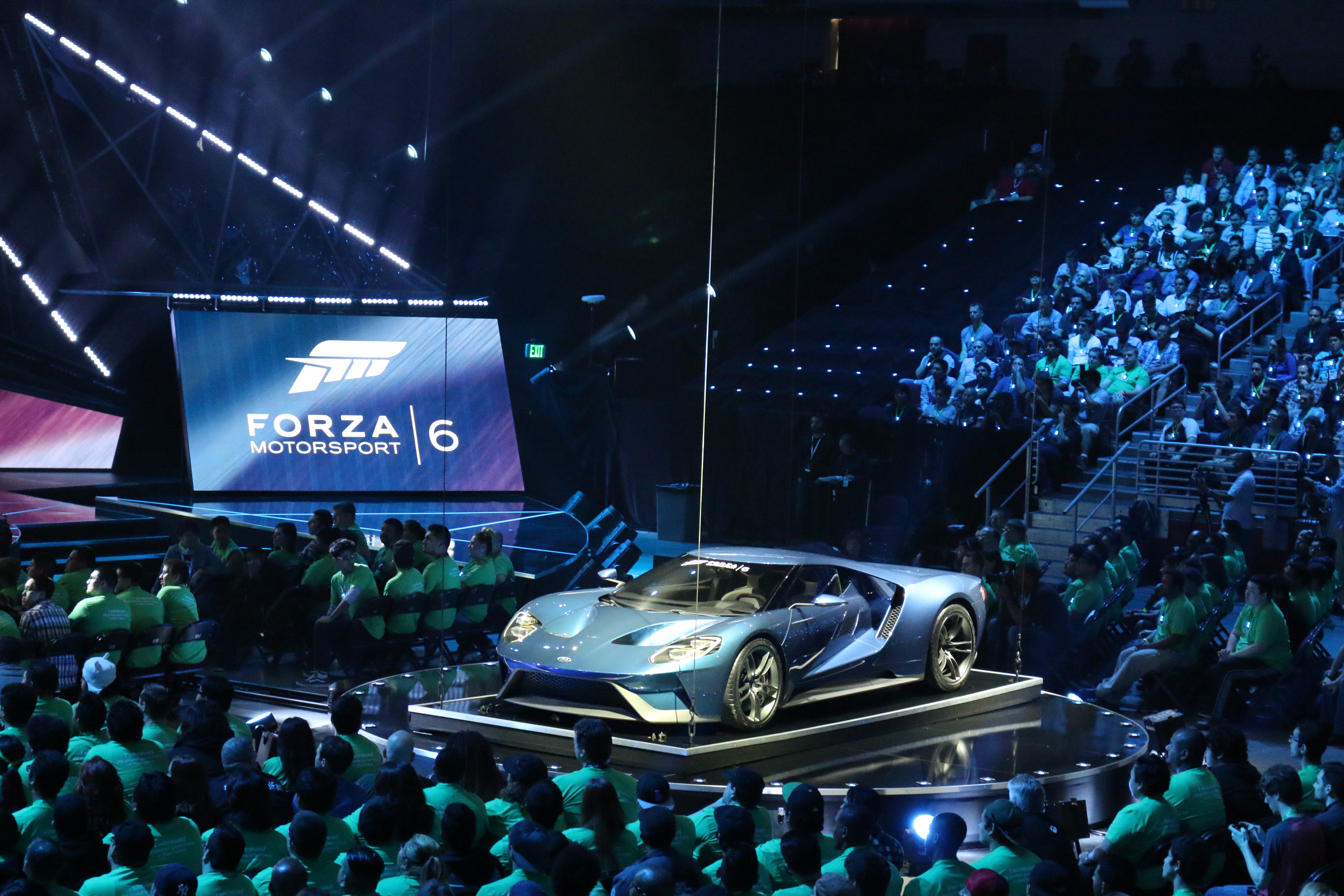
The Ford GT prototype and Forza Motorsport 6 cover car presented at the Xbox Media Briefing, E3 2015

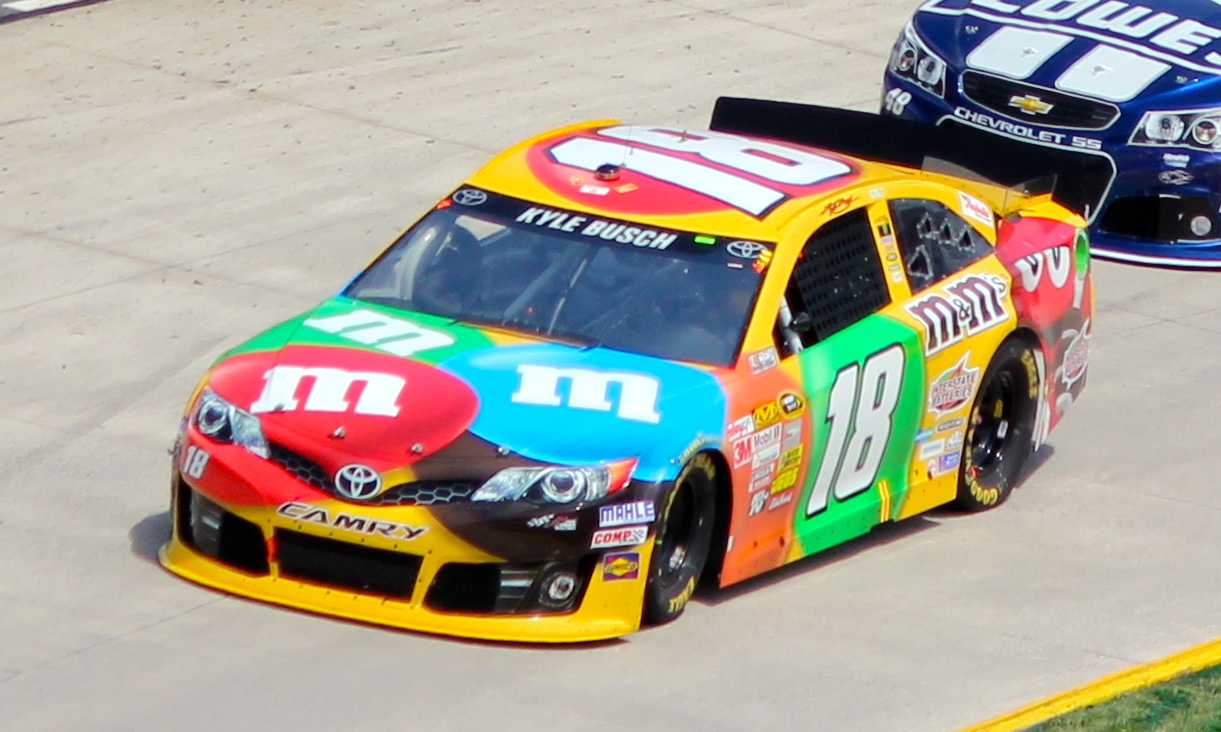
A NASCAR expansion was made available in Forza Motorsport 6 via downloadable content. The content features sixth generation cars, such as Kyle Busch's car seen in the image racing at the 2013 STP Gas Booster 500, a new track, Homestead-Miami Speedway, and a full racing campaign.

Forza Motorsport 6 was first revealed to the public as part of the 2015 North American International Auto Show in Detroit, Michigan on January 12, 2015. The announcement was made on the same day that Ford Motor Company unveiled its newest iteration of the Ford GT supercar, along with a broader line of high-performance vehicles. Ford and Microsoft have entered into an exclusive agreement that will make the 2017 Ford GT the cover car for the game, and the GT and other newly revealed cars, such as the newest model of the Ford F-150 Raptor and the Ford Mustang GT350, available in the game. According to Henry Ford III, the executive in charge of the GT's development, the arrangement is part of Ford's view that video games are "a new avenue for us to reach our customers". Similarly, the deal gave Turn 10 Studios direct access to Ford's design teams as the new GT was in development. Staffers with Turn 10 were some of the few people outside of Ford that knew of the GT's existence. According to Turn 10's John Wendl, "this is the first time we've been able to launch a car and a game at the same time". Certain design and performance aspects of the Ford GT were first revealed through the game including the car's active rear wing which automatically changes its angle in different conditions, such as under braking.

The sound team recorded actual cars for the game, capturing intake, engine, and exhaust sounds. They used a looping model to implement car engine sounds in-game. The looping model shifts the pitch of cross-faded loops over the rev range, and was created from recordings of a car on a dyno making full-throttle runs. Vehicle recording was performed by Warner Bros. Post Production. The team used lavalier and omni mics in and around the car to capture audio, relying on high SPL mics and pre-amp attenuators for certain race cars can reach 130 dB SPL.

Dan Greenawalt, creative director of Turn 10 Studios, stated that additional details, including in-game footage, would be released during E3 2015. While a release date was not announced at the initial reveal, Microsoft later stated that the game would launch in time for the 2015 holiday season. 2015 also represents the 10th anniversary year for the Forza Motorsport franchise. At E3 2015, Forza Motorsport 6 was featured heavily during Microsoft's pre-show press conference, and included an appearance by a pre-production version of the Ford GT. At the press conference, Microsoft announced that Forza Motorsport 6 would launch in North America and Australia on September 15, 2015, in Japan on September 17, and in Europe, the Middle East and Africa on September 18. On August 27, 2015, Turn 10 announced that the game had been declared gold, indicating it was being prepared for duplication and release. A demo of the game was released on September 1, 2015.

On June 23, 2015, Microsoft announced the Forza Motorsport 6 Limited Edition Xbox One Console at the Further with Ford Conference in San Francisco. The console is the first custom console from Xbox with a racing theme and features a custom blue color, racing stripe motif, automotive sound effects, and a digital copy of the game. Microsoft produced a series of three one-of-a-kind Xbox One controllers to commemorate Ford's legendary victories at the 24 Hours of Le Mans in the 1960s. Each controller matches the color and livery of historic Ford-powered cars including the 1964 Shelby Daytona Coupe, the 1966 GT40 Mk. II, and the 1967 GT40 Mk IV. The controllers were unveiled Friday, June 12, 2015, by Ford Motor Company during the 24 Hours of Le Mans weekend.

Forza Motorsport 6: Apex was announced on March 1, 2016, for Microsoft Windows. It is a free-to-play racing game that features optional micro-transactions and contains 63 cars and 12 racing events. The game was released on September 6, 2016. On the November 7, 2016, Turn 10 Studios released the Premium Edition which includes two car packs (14 cars in total), the Nürburgring and 15 exclusive events.

== Reception ==
Reception

Aggregate score
Aggregator	Score
Metacritic	87/100

Review scores
Publication	Score
Destructoid	9.5/10
Electronic Gaming Monthly	9.5/10
Game Informer	7.75/10
GameRevolution	4.5/5
GameSpot	8/10
GamesRadar+	3/5
IGN	9/10
Official Xbox Magazine (US)	4/5

Forza Motorsport 6 received positive reviews. It has an aggregated score of 87/100 on Metacritic based on 85 reviews. By the end of 2015, the game had sold over 1 million copies. According to a report in June 2017 from Turn 10 Studios creative director Dan Greenawalt, the game, along with other franchise titles such as Forza Horizon 3, had a 4.8 million active player base.

Chris Carter from Destructoid wrote that Forza Motorsport 6 made him like the franchise again after Forza Motorsport 5, which he thought was "rushed". He praised the game's rewind feature, visual upgrade, and graphical details. He also praised the Drivatar artificial intelligence system, due to their unstable behaviors. He thought that racing against these AI bots is as fun as racing against other players in the competitive multiplayer mode. He also described the content delivered by Forza Motorsport 6 as "more than a full game", due to the increased number of both cars and tracks.

Ray Carsillo from Electronic Gaming Monthly also shared similar enthusiasm about the game. He stated that night racing and weather effects have effectively introduced more variety to the game. He commended the new online features implemented, and he thought that these features effectively extend the game's longevity. He also praised the game's physics and visuals but disliked the tracks featured, which he found repetitive. He considered it as the best entry in the entire series, and recommended racing game lovers to play the game. Luke Reilly from IGN applauded its weather system, as he thought it was both visually and physically impressive, and the night-driving sections and races. He liked its core mechanics and car handling, as well as the varied cars featured. He considered it as a leap forward from Forza Motorsport 5, but criticized the tracks for being "snapshots of a certain time of day and temperature" and concluded that the track conditions are "baked in". Nevertheless, he called it one of the best racing games for consoles.

Miguel Concepcion from GameSpot praised the Drivatar system and the Driving Mods, as he thought that they have added more variety to races. He praised the system that rewards players using challenging settings with a corresponding number of credits and applauded the multiplayer modes featured in the game, which he thought suit the style of all kind of players, both new and old, but criticized the pre- and post-race visuals and replays for running at fewer than 60 frames per second. He also lauded the artificial intelligence for being "unpredictable". However, Matthew Kato from Game Informer felt that the weather system was exaggerated, and added that they may take away the fun of some races, and the overhauled career mode, which he described as "somewhere between those in Forza 5 and Forza 4" is not engaging enough for most players. However, he praised the number of cars and tracks featured, as well as its high replay value. Justin Towell from GamesRadar criticized the game's slow-paced career mode, as he felt that it has failed to deliver an intense experience. He also felt the handling was "odd" and the Drivatar system was "inconsistent". However, he praised the rich content featured, and added that by comparison, Forza 6 makes Forza 5 to look like a game demo instead of a full game.

=== Awards ===
List of awards and nominations
Award	Category	Result	Ref.
The Game Awards 2015	Best Sports/Racing Game	Nominated	
19th Annual D.I.C.E. Awards	Racing Game of the Year	Won	
