= Pelissero =

Pelissero is an Italian surname. Notable people with the surname include:

- Claudio Pelissero (born 1968), Italian music composer and producer
- Harry Pelissero (born 1952), Canadian politician
- John Peter Pelissero (born 1953), American political scientist
- Tom Pelissero, American sports journalist
