= Forza =

Racing video game series

- Logo since 2020
- Genre: Racing
- Developers: Turn 10 Studios; Playground Games; Sumo Digital
- Publisher: Xbox Game Studios
- Creator: Dan Greenawalt
- Platforms: Xbox; Xbox 360; Xbox One; Xbox Series X/S; Microsoft Windows; iOS; Android; PlayStation 5
- First release: Forza Motorsport; May 3, 2005
- Latest release: Forza Horizon 6 May 19, 2026

Forza (/ˈfɔːrtsə/ FORT-sə, Italian: [ˈfɔrtsa]; Italian for "force" and "strength") is a racing video game series for Xbox consoles and Microsoft Windows published by Xbox Game Studios.

The franchise is primarily divided into two ongoing titles. The original Forza Motorsport series developed by American developer Turn 10 Studios focuses on primarily simulation racing around a variety of both real and fictional tracks, and seeks to emulate the performance and handling characteristics of many real-life production, modified, and racing cars. The Forza Horizon series developed by British developer Playground Games features more arcade-style racing while maintaining a toned down version of Motorsport's simulation physics. Horizon revolves around a music and racing festival called the "Horizon Festival" and features open world environments set in fictional representations of real-world areas in which players may freely roam and participate in racing events.

Apart from Motorsport and Horizon, Forza has also seen two since-discontinued mobile and computer free-to-play spin-offs; Forza Street (2019–2022), a drag racing-style game set in Miami, and Forza Customs (2023–2025), a tile-matching video game based on car customization. Both spin-offs were initially released as independent games before being rebranded as Forza titles.

The franchise has sold 16 million copies as of December 2016 and has garnered critical acclaim.

== History ==
Release timeline
2005	Motorsport (2005)
2006
2007	Motorsport 2
2008
2009	Motorsport 3
2010
2011	Motorsport 4
2012	Horizon
2013	Motorsport 5
2014	Horizon 2
2015	Motorsport 6
2016	Horizon 3
2017	Motorsport 7
2018	Horizon 4
2019	Street
2020
2021	Horizon 5
2022
2023	Motorsport (2023)
2023	Customs
2024
2025
2026	Horizon 6

Turn 10 Studios was established in 2001 by Microsoft, under its Microsoft Game Studios division, to develop a series of racing games, which later became known as Forza, as the Xbox rival to Gran Turismo for PlayStation. At the time of the studio's establishment, most staff had experience in publishing games, such as Project Gotham Racing and Golf 4.0, but had not been involved in game development. The first Forza Motorsport was designed to showcase the technological capabilities of Microsoft's first console, the original Xbox, including its Xbox Live online multiplayer network. From the start, Turn 10's approach to the series has been to broaden its appeal to the general audience and not limit it to racing enthusiasts, passionately highlighting car culture along the way. Also integral to the series' development is the considerable amount of research put into the race cars' handling, sometimes involving professional race teams as of Formula One and NASCAR.

Every Forza title includes an artificial neural network used by its AI racers, called Drivatars, a portmanteau of driver and avatar. Drivatars were developed and designed by Microsoft Research Cambridge to learn and adapt to the player's driving. In early Forza titles, the Drivatars ran on a Bayesian neural network, which calculates possible solutions to a problem and their probabilities based on player data collected from previous races before selecting the one with the highest confidence value. Such a problem may be reaching a certain turn, at which point the appropriate angle at which to turn and the amount of pressure on the accelerator must be determined. Initially, the only way to share the learned Drivatars was to copy them onto Xbox Memory Units for use by other Xbox consoles. Since Forza Motorsport 5, the Drivatars have used a reinforcement learning paradigm, and have recorded racing data of all players connected to the cloud as part of the Xbox Network. In this paradigm, the Drivatars track the player's car position and speed and the consistency of the behavior and guess their turn angle and speed for a given segment, enabling the Drivatars to infer solutions for courses the player had not yet raced on and input for cars the player had not yet raced with. The data is then uploaded to the cloud to update the Drivatar behavior, and the new Drivatars are then downloaded to other Xbox consoles. Each upload is timestamped, and older uploads are treated with less confidence. There have been concerns that players could abuse the system to rubber-band the Drivatars' AI back to them, but Turn 10 has stated that the only thing that is rubber-banded are their cars, whose performance is slightly modified based on how far they are ahead of or behind the player. Turn 10 inserted a layer of control between player and AI inputs that allows for the developers to modify Drivatar behavior so as to prevent unexpected results.

Initially, Turn 10 designed models for cars and tracks using commercial off-the-shelf software such as 3D Studio Max. Today, it develops and uses a proprietary 3D modelling software called Fuel that allows multiple artists to work on the same model simultaneously, primarily those for cars and racing tracks. Due to increasing complexity of video games, it took six months for four people to design a single car model for Xbox One versions of Forza, so Turn 10 came to rely on car manufacturers to share CAD files, scan real-life cars, or send out a photographer to take hundreds or thousands of photographs of newly launched cars.

Playground Games was co-founded in 2009 in Leamington Spa, England, by Gavin Raeburn, Trevor Williams, and Ralph Fulton, all former employees of Codemasters. Raeburn was known for his role in developing critical hits such as the Dirt and TOCA series, but he became inspired by the open world environment of Test Drive Unlimited, and so left Codemasters feeling that it lacked the resources to fulfill his ambitions. Other members of Playground have included former employees of Bizarre Creations, Black Rock Studio, and Sony Liverpool—all racing game companies of the United Kingdom. At the same time, Turn 10 Studios began seeking out businesses in hopes of finding one willing to expand and branch out its franchise. At E3 2010, he and Williams offered Turn 10 a concept of an open-world Forza Motorsport in exchange for resources, to which Turn 10 agreed. Playground then developed what was to become Forza Horizon, collaborating with and closely backed by Turn 10. Playground Games had had a strong relationship as a third-party developer with Microsoft Studios, but it was only in a June 10 conference at E3 2018 that the company announced its acquisition by Microsoft.

Until 2019, each installment of the franchise series had alternated on a biennial basis; the Motorsport entries were released in odd-numbered years, while the Horizon entries were released in even-numbered years. This pattern was altered due to the absence of a new Motorsport game in 2019. In 2025, Forza Horizon 5 was announced and slated for release on Sony's PlayStation 5 console in Q1/Q2 2025 as part of Microsoft Gaming's ongoing plans to distribute their first-party library on multiple platforms, marking the first time the franchise has shipped on a non-Xbox console. In July 2025, Turn 10 Studios was reported to have lost almost half of its then-current workforce amidst layoffs being conducted at Microsoft Gaming ahead of the new financial year. Shortly thereafter, reports anticipated that the developer would be reorganized into a support studio for future Forza Horizon entries. This was later confirmed in a blog post by Turn 10 Studios in December 2025, which announced that Forza Motorsport would receive no further content updates, though its servers would remain active. While this concludes active development for the current title, Microsoft Gaming leadership has clarified that the Forza Motorsport franchise remains a parked asset rather than a discontinued one, leaving the series long-term future open for future strategic re-engagement.

=== ForzaTech ===
ForzaTech is the proprietary video game engine created by Turn 10 Studios. It is the main engine used for the Forza series. The game engine was trademarked by Microsoft in 2015 and has since been used to develop current Forza games, as well as the Fable reboot.

== Titles ==
=== Motorsport ===
Title	Year	Platform				
Title	Year	PC	XBOX	X360	XONE	XSX/S
Forza Motorsport (2005)	2005	No	Yes	BC (Note: Backwards compatible)	No	No
Forza Motorsport 2	2007	No	No	Yes	No	No
Forza Motorsport 3	2009	No	No	Yes	No	No
Forza Motorsport 4	2011	No	No	Yes	No	No
Forza Motorsport 5	2013	No	No	No	Yes	BC
Forza Motorsport 6	2015	Yes (Note: The PC edition was released as a free to play special edition titled Forza Motorsport 6: Apex.)	No	No	Yes	BC
Forza Motorsport 7	2017	Yes	No	No	Yes	BC
Forza Motorsport (2023)	2023	Yes	No	No	No	Yes

==== Forza Motorsport (2005) ====
Forza Motorsport was released on May 3, 2005, and is the first installment in the Forza Motorsport series. It is the only title in the series to be released on the original Xbox console. It features 231 cars and racetracks from 15 real-world and fictional locations. Common elements established by this game for future Forza titles include effects of damage on car performance, a paint job and decal editor, the ability to tune one's car and purchase upgrades using in-game credits won at previous races, and assist functions that make driving easier but at the cost of bonus end-of-race credits. It also supported online multiplayer via Xbox Live, as have all of its successors. The Honda NSX and a tuned Nissan 350Z are the cover vehicles. It is playable on the Xbox 360 via backwards compatibility.

==== Forza Motorsport 2 (2007) ====
The sequel to Forza Motorsport and the first Xbox 360 title in the series, Forza Motorsport 2, was released on May 29, 2007. It features a total of 349 cars and 23 different circuits from twelve locations. The series' support for force feedback first appears in this installment (Microsoft's Xbox 360 Wireless Racing Wheel was designed to work with the game and support that feature). Car customization is also expanded; there are about 50 percent more parts and upgrades than in the previous installment, up to 4,100 vinyls can be applied to any car, and cars can be sold online with custom skins for in-game credits in the game's new auction house. The system that groups cars into letter-based classes based on their performance, expressed as a numerical performance index, now takes into account changes to one's car that make it more or less powerful, raising or lowering the index and possibly reclassifying the car. Prior to the game's release, Microsoft launched Forza Motorsport Showdown, a four-part TV miniseries on Speed. The show was produced by Bud Brutsman and hosted by Lee Reherman. A tuned Nissan 350z is the cover vehicle.

==== Forza Motorsport 3 (2009) ====
Forza Motorsport 3, released on October 27, 2009, includes more than 400 cars from 50 manufacturers and about 100 race track variations. Sport utility vehicles and stock cars make their debut in this game's car roster. The game introduces more optional assists aimed at making driving less challenging for less-experienced players. One of them is the rewind feature, which allows the player to turn back time to fix any previous mistake made on the track. Auto-braking brakes the player's car to prevent it from skidding off the track at turns, and the auto-tuner automatically tunes the car's aspects. The career mode has been revised for this edition of Forza Motorsport to contain 250 events, some of which involve two new modes: drag racing and drifting. It is also the first game in the franchise to feature a cockpit camera, as well as the ability to capture, edit, and share clips of gameplay. The Audi R8 is the cover vehicle.

==== Forza Motorsport 4 (2011) ====
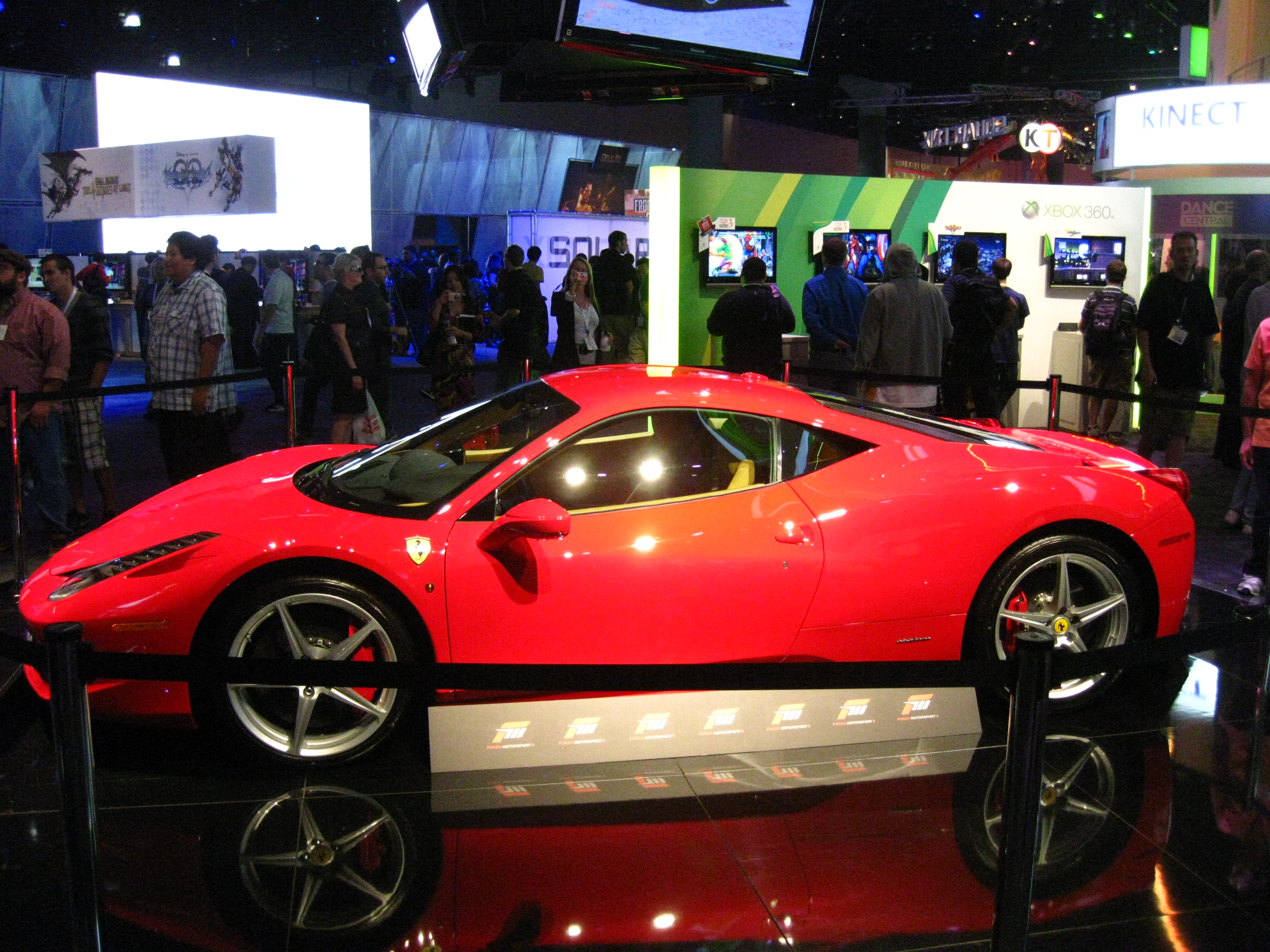
Promotion of Forza Motorsport 4 featuring a Ferrari 458 at E3 2011

For Forza Motorsport 4, which was released on October 11, 2011, Turn 10 Studios partnered with BBC's Top Gear to get Jeremy Clarkson to provide commentary for the new Autovista mode, which allows players to explore a certain selection of cars in great detail. The game is also the first in the franchise to utilize the Kinect sensor. Players can utilize the sensor to turn their head to either side, and the game dynamically follows in a similar motion, turning the game camera to the side. It is the final Forza Motorsport released for Xbox 360. The 2009 Ferrari 458 is the cover vehicle.

==== Forza Motorsport 5 (2013) ====
Forza Motorsport 5, the fifth installment in the Motorsport series and the sixth in the Forza series, was released as an Xbox One launch title on November 22, 2013. The game expanded on the Top Gear partnership by having Richard Hammond and James May provide commentary alongside Clarkson. The Autovista mode was renamed Forzavista, and new to the series are open-wheel cars and integrated cloud computing, which collects and uses driving data from connected players to shape Drivatar behavior and through which user-generated paint jobs can be downloaded. The 2013 McLaren P1 was the cover vehicle.

==== Forza Motorsport 6 (2015) ====
Forza Motorsport 6, released for Xbox One on September 15, 2015, introduces new gameplay elements such as racing in the rain or at night, an online ranking system called Leagues that matches players based on their skill level, and game-modifying cards. The game increases the number of racers in any race to 24 and has a much richer selection of cars and locations than its predecessor—460 and 26, respectively. Players can also now choose whether to toggle the Drivatars' aggression. A cut-down, free-to-play Windows 10 version of the game, known as Forza Motorsport 6: Apex, was released on September 6, 2016, as "a focused and curated single-player tour of Forza Motorsport's best content". The 2017 Ford GT super-car is the cover vehicle. On September 15, 2019, it was made unavailable for purchase due to the expiration of various car and track licenses.

==== Forza Motorsport 7 (2017) ====
Forza Motorsport 7 was developed for Windows 10 and Xbox One. The game was released on October 3, 2017. This game includes many tracks, including the return of Maple Valley Raceway, the fictional track last included in Forza Motorsport 4. Forza Motorsport 7 has the largest set of playable vehicles of any Forza game to date, at 830 cars. 700 cars are included in the base game, while 130 were later added as downloadable content. The 2018 Porsche 911 GT2 RS is the cover vehicle.

==== Forza Motorsport (2023) ====
The eighth Forza Motorsport game serves as a reboot of the Motorsport sub-series. It was first announced during Microsoft's Xbox Games Showcase on July 23, 2020, and was eventually released on October 10, 2023. The 2023 Cadillac V-Series.R and the 2024 Chevrolet Corvette E-Ray are the cover vehicles.

=== Horizon ===
Title	Year	Locale	Platform				
Title	Year	Locale	PC	X360	XONE	XSX/S	PS5
Forza Horizon	2012	Colorado, United States	No	Yes	BC	BC	No
Forza Horizon 2	2014	French and Italian Rivieras	No	Yes	Yes	BC	No
Forza Horizon 3	2016	Australia	Yes	No	Yes	BC	No
Forza Horizon 4	2018	United Kingdom	Yes	No	Yes	Yes	No
Forza Horizon 5	2021	Mexico	Yes	No	Yes	Yes	Yes
Forza Horizon 6	2026	Japan	Yes	No	No	Yes	Yes

==== Forza Horizon (2012) ====
Forza Horizon was developed for the Xbox 360 and is the first open-world game in the series. It is based around a fictitious festival called the Horizon Festival, set in the U.S. state of Colorado. The game incorporates many different gameplay aspects from previous Forza Motorsport titles, like the large variety of cars, realistic physics, and high-definition graphics. The aim is to progress through the game by means of obtaining wristbands by driving fast, destroying property, winning races, and other driving antics. Horizon features the physics of Forza Motorsport 4, which have been optimized to work on the more than 65 variants of terrain said to be present in the game. Players can drive off-road in select areas, while others are limited by guardrails or other means. Horizon allows the player to modify the car that is selected from the garage by changing numerous features, both internally and externally on a car. One can also obtain cars by winning races with random drivers on the street, by winning larger competitive races, and by finding barns housing hidden treasure cars that cannot otherwise be bought through the game's "Auto-show" or through racing. The 2013 Dodge SRT Viper GTS is the cover car. The game is backward-compatible with the Xbox One and the Xbox Series X/S.

==== Forza Horizon 2 (2014) ====
Forza Horizon 2 was developed for the Xbox 360 and Xbox One. The game is set in Southern France and Northern Italy, and the playing field is three times the map of its predecessor. The Xbox 360 version was developed by Sumo Digital, and is the final Forza game for Xbox 360. The Xbox One version introduced dynamic weather and lighting systems to the series. Tuning also made a return in the Xbox One version of the game, after being absent from the previous Horizon title. Both versions feature day-and-night cycles and cross-country races of up to 12 players and two "Bucket Lists", one for France and the other for Italy. Bucket Lists are lists of location-specific challenges involving certain vehicles for the player to complete, such as driving a Ford Raptor through a forest with only headlights to light the player's way. Additionally, its single-player and multiplayer modes have merged to allow for seamless connectivity, where other players can join in or drop out of the host's session without interrupting the latter's progress. In this edition of Forza Horizon, "Car Meets" serves as an online hub for players to compare their cars and share their own designs or tunes for others to use, as well as socialize and challenge each other in showdown races. The 2014 Lamborghini Huracán LP 610-4 was the cover car.

==== Forza Horizon 3 (2016) ====
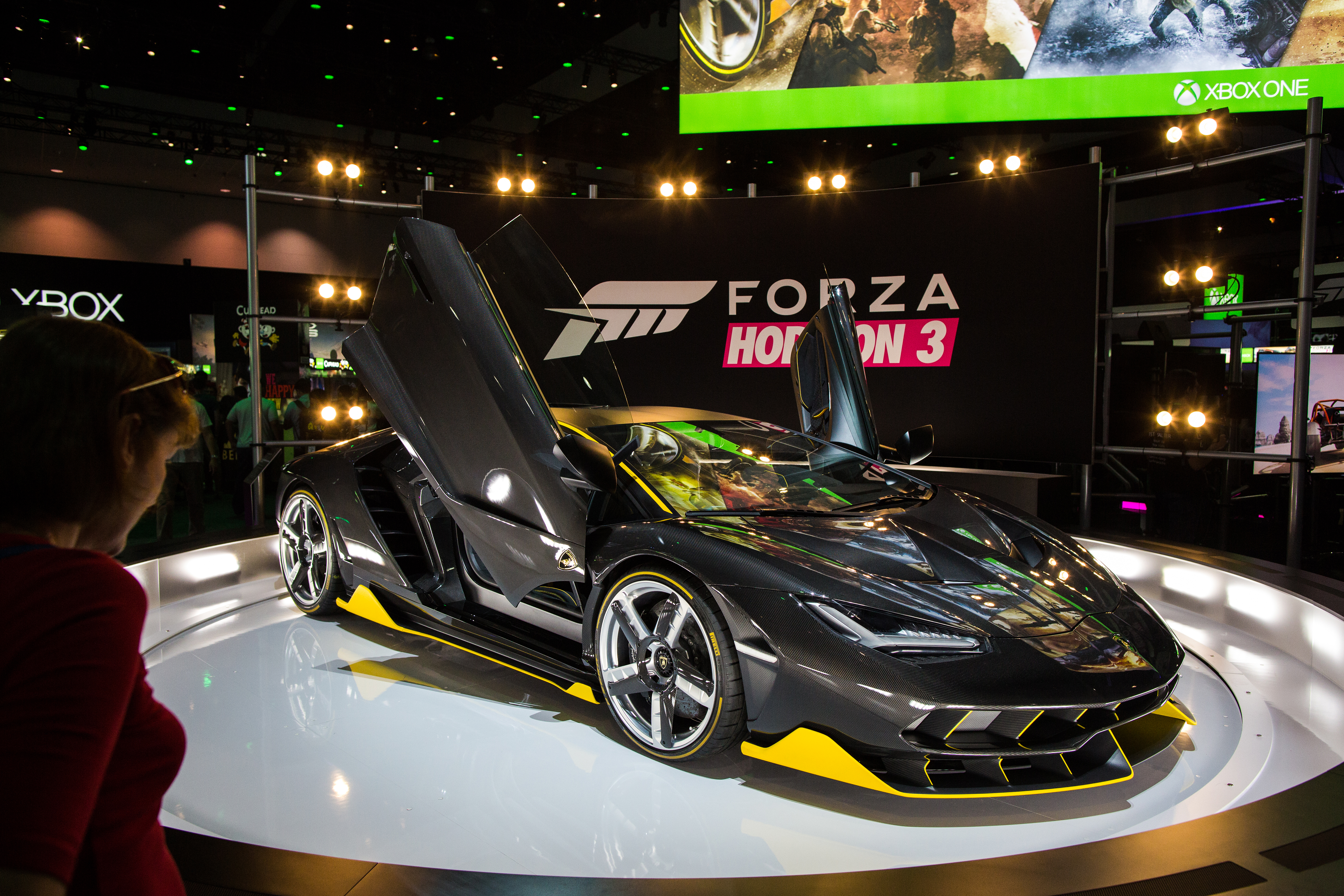
Promotion for Forza Horizon 3 during E3 2016

Forza Horizon 3 was released for Xbox One and Windows 10 on September 27, 2016. Its support for Xbox Play Anywhere makes it the first Forza title to allow cross-play on the two Microsoft platforms. The game is set in Australia, and has the player represented in the game as the host of the Horizon Festival itself. Its topography, car roster, and cast of player avatars have all diversified. For the first time, the terrain includes sand and deep bodies of water that can be driven on or into, and the car roster, which is expanded to 350 cars, encompasses off-road racing buggies and trophy trucks. The single-player campaign mode adds co-op, in which up to three players join the host to complete the latter's objectives. Progression is kept regardless of which mode campaign is played in. A new mode called Horizon Blueprint allows players to edit events by changing their routes, number thereof, and time of day and determining which cars are eligible for the events. An expansion titled Blizzard Mountain was released on December 13, 2016, featuring a snow area along with the name giving blizzard storms, eight new cars, and the 2016 Ford Focus RSRX as its cover vehicle. A second expansion themed around Hot Wheels was released on May 9, 2017. This expansion features a new area called "Thrilltopia" and adds orange and blue Hot Wheels track with loops, jumps, corkscrews, boost pads, half-pipes and more. The expansion also includes ten new cars. The Hot Wheels Twin Mill is the cover vehicle. The 2016 Lamborghini Centenario LP 770-4 and the 2017 Ford F-150 Raptor Race Truck were the cover cars.

==== Forza Horizon 4 (2018) ====
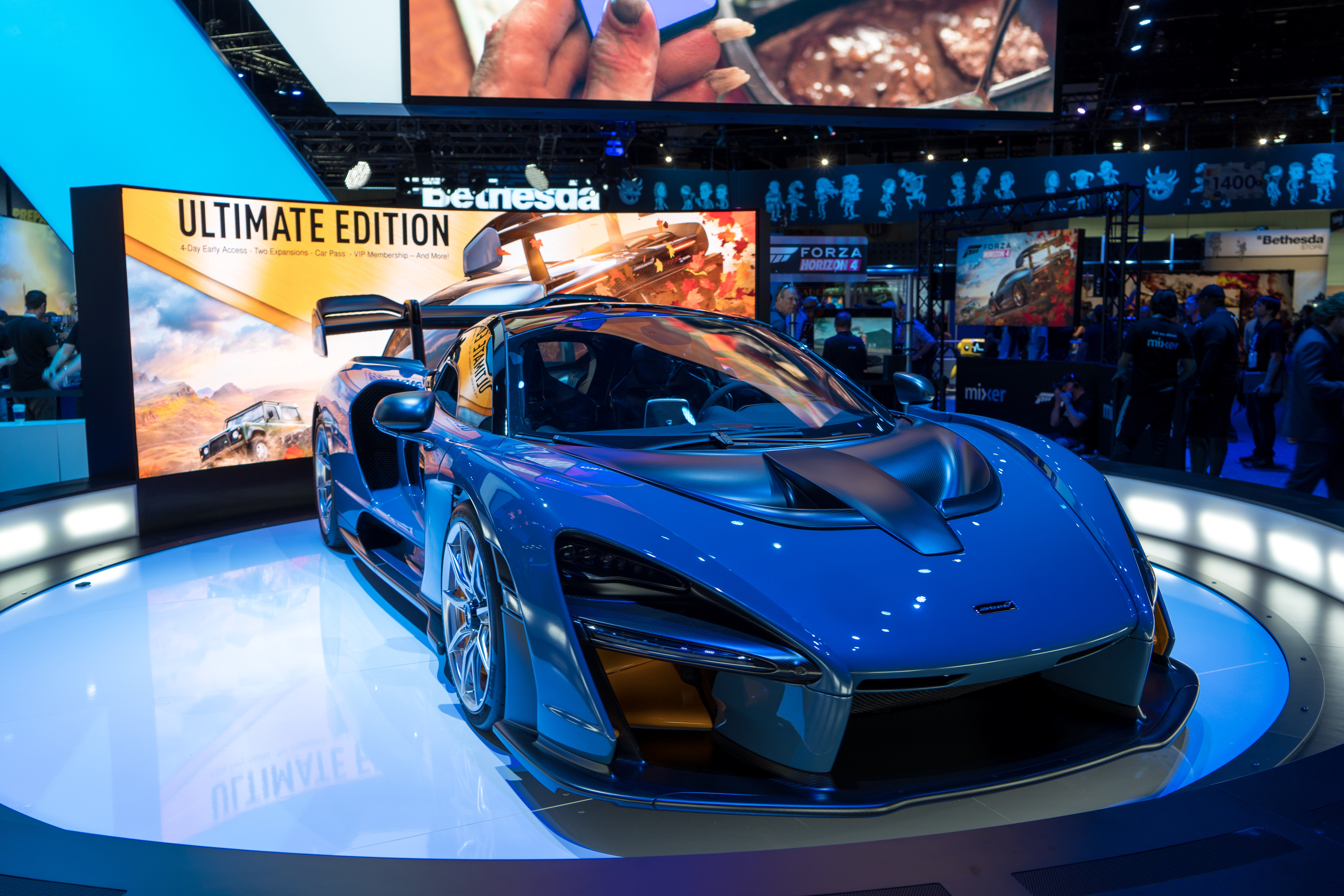
Promotion of Forza Horizon 4 featuring a McLaren Senna at E3 2018

Forza Horizon 4 was developed for the Xbox One and Windows 10 and released on October 2, 2018. The game is set in Great Britain, and features over 450 cars from more than one hundred manufacturers. It introduces a dynamic four-season scheme that rotates on a weekly basis and changes aspects of the environment, such as rivers drying in the summer. Places such as Edinburgh Castle can now be purchased as property, unlocking benefits. For the first time, players are given the option to traverse the same world as others in single-player or on a 72-player server. The 2018 McLaren Senna and 1997 Land Rover Defender 90 are the cover cars. Shortly after launch, a patch was released adding a Route Creator, where players draw custom point-to-point and circuit racing routes and place their checkpoints on the map.

==== Forza Horizon 5 (2021) ====
Forza Horizon 5 was developed and released for the Xbox One, Xbox Series X/S, and Windows 10 on November 9, 2021, and is set in Mexico. The seasons return, but to account for Mexico's diverse landscape, different parts of the map have their own weather that rotates seasonally. A new mode called EventLab allows players to create races with their own rules and objectives. Also new is Forza Link, an AI assistant that tracks one's progress and preferred means of playing the game and the players they meet online. It then uses that information to match players with statistically similar interests. The Mercedes-AMG One and the 2021 Ford Bronco Badlands are the cover cars. In 2025, Forza Horizon 5 was announced and slated for release on Sony's PlayStation 5 console on April 29, 2025 as part of Microsoft Gaming's ongoing plans to distribute their first-party library on multiple platforms, marking the first time the franchise has shipped on a non-Xbox console.

==== Forza Horizon 6 (2026) ====
Forza Horizon 6 is a video game revealed at the 2025 Tokyo Game Show. The game launched on Xbox Series X/S and PC at the 19th of May 2026, with PlayStation 5 support arriving later. The game is set in Japan, with seasons returning. Locations including Tokyo and Mount Haruna are confirmed drivable, with Mount Fuji as a background asset. The Toyota GR GT and the Toyota Land Cruiser 250 are the cover vehicles.

=== Spin-offs ===
==== Forza Street (2019–2022) ====
Forza Street was a free-to-play racing game developed by Electric Square that was initially released for Windows 10 as Miami Street on May 8, 2018. The game was re-branded as a Forza title on April 15, 2019, and was also released for iOS and Android on May 5, 2020. Forza Street used Unreal Engine 4 instead of ForzaTech. Unlike the main Motorsport and Horizon titles, Street featured short, quick street races, and was meant to be played on low-end devices. Gameplay involved players controlling only the acceleration and braking by pressing and releasing a button or a touch screen; steering was handled automatically. Players could also use nitrous to give their cars a speed boost. There was no definite cover car, as the app icon changed the cars out based on what special event was going on.

Forza Street's reviews were mixed. Although its visuals were praised, it was criticized for its overly simplistic controls, its implementation of the freemium model, and tedious gameplay. Critics rank it as the worst title on their lists of Forza games that include the spin-off. On January 10, 2022, Andy Beaudoin, a principal design director at Turn 10 Studios, announced the closure of Forza Street in spring 2022, due to the "shift its focus to new and exciting Forza experiences." The game received its final update on the same date, reducing the energy recharge time, increasing energy storage, reducing wait times for car shows, reducing prices on most items purchasable using in-game currency, and disabling the purchasing of microtransactions, refunding customers who purchased any microtransactions in the last 30 days prior to the in-app store's closure. The game was shut down on April 11, 2022.

==== Forza Customs (2023–2025) ====
Forza Customs was a free-to-play tile-matching video game developed by British developer Hutch Games, the second mobile spin-off in the Forza franchise, and the franchise's first non-racing game title, using the Unity engine instead of ForzaTech. Similar to Forza Street, it is a rebrand of a previously released game titled Custom Car Works, and is themed after car modification and customization.

The game was closed and removed from app stores on March 10, 2025.

== Reception ==
Aggregate review scores
Game	Metacritic
Forza Motorsport (2005)	(Xbox) 92/100
Forza Motorsport 2	(X360) 90/100
Forza Motorsport 3	(X360) 92/100
Forza Motorsport 4	(X360) 91/100
Forza Horizon	(X360) 85/100
Forza Motorsport 5	(XONE) 79/100
Forza Horizon 2	(XONE) 86/100
Forza Motorsport 6	(XONE) 87/100
Forza Horizon 3	(PC) 86/100 (XONE) 91/100
Forza Motorsport 7	(PC) 82/100 (XONE) 86/100
Forza Horizon 4	(PC) 88/100 (XONE) 92/100
Forza Horizon 5	(PC) 91/100 (XSXS) 92/100
Forza Motorsport (2023)	(PC) 83/100 (XSXS) 84/100
Forza Horizon 6	(PC) 90/100 (XSXS) 90/100

The Forza series is viewed as one of the most recognized brands of the racing genre. The games sold over 10 million copies by August 2014 and 16 million copies as of April 2021, becoming the sixth best-selling racing franchise. It is also one of the highest-grossing video game franchises, grossing over US$1 billion at retail by December 2016. Individually, Forza Motorsport 3 sold 3 million units by February 2010. Forza Motorsport 5 was bought by over one third of all Xbox One owners in February 2014, which Eurogamer estimates amounts to 1.3 million copies. By December 2016, around 2.5 million Forza Horizon 3 units were sold. Over 14 million unique players were registered in the Forza community on Xbox One and Windows 10 by December 2016.

The first Forza Motorsport received critical acclaim for its realistic handling mechanics, paint job editor—both features that have reappeared in every subsequent version of Forza—and Xbox Live integration. Additional assists in Forza Motorsport 3's such as the rewind ability were praised. Reviewers also lauded Forza Motorsport 4's Autovista mode. The franchise as a whole has received generally favorable reviews. Every main title in the Forza Motorsport and Forza Horizon series has received an aggregate review score of at least 80 out of 100 on Metacritic; the only exception is Forza Motorsport 5, which at launch received criticism for featuring fewer cars and tracks compared to its predecessors (though some of the content withdrawn from the final release reappeared in the form of DLCs), as well as microtransactions in which players could purchase in-game tokens to progress faster, to the latter of which Turn 10 Studios responded by increasing rewards won at the end of a race and decreasing car prices.

The concept of Forza Horizon received positive remarks for demonstrating the potential that the new series had, although the game's Drivatars' AI and sparse multiplayer were criticized. As of August 2019, Forza Horizon 4 surpassed 12 million players. The Horizon series has since outperformed the Motorsport games, which despite their technical leaps have struggled to replicate the former's success for not being substantially different and as trends show that players prefer Horizon's gameplay.

The series is notable for employing one of the longest-running applications of machine learning in gaming for its AI. Since Horizon 3, the Forza Horizon series have been a perennial winner of Best Sports/Racing Game at The Game Awards.
