= Forza Motorsport 5 =

2013 video game

- Cover art featuring the McLaren P1 racing through Prague
- Developer: Turn 10 Studios
- Publisher: Microsoft Studios
- Director: Dan Greenawalt
- Producers: Barry Feather; Ryan B. Cooper
- Designers: Rhett Mathis; William Giese; Elliott Lyons
- Programmers: Daniel Adent; Chris Tector
- Composer: Lance Hayes
- Series: Forza
- Platform: Xbox One
- Release: November 22, 2013
- Genre: Racing
- Modes: Single-player, multiplayer

Forza Motorsport 5 is a 2013 racing video game developed by Turn 10 Studios and published by Microsoft Studios for Xbox One. It is the fifth Forza Motorsport and sixth overall installment in the Forza series. The game was revealed on May 21, 2013 during the Xbox One reveal event and was released on November 22, 2013 as a launch title. Jeremy Clarkson, who was featured in the previous installment, Forza Motorsport 4, returned to narrate alongside James May and Richard Hammond, who co-presented alongside Clarkson in Top Gear. The narration was used for the game's commentary when choosing a new event, championship, or league.

Forza Motorsport 5 received generally positive reviews, with aggregate review websites GameRankings and Metacritic giving a score of 79.49% and 79 out of 100, respectively. Reviewers praised the game's visuals and artificial intelligence, but were critical of the lack of content in relation to its predecessor, Forza Motorsport 4.

A follow-up installment, Forza Motorsport 6, was released in 2015.

== Gameplay ==
Forza Motorsport 5 features both fictional and real-world tracks. Here the Ferrari F12 Berlinetta races at Circuit de Spa-Francorchamps.

Forza Motorsport 5 is a simulation racing video game. Players compete in events around the globe using real licensed cars on a variety of real world and fictional courses. It features an arcade mode, meant more for quickplay of races, and a career mode, which is focused on long-term play. Career mode spans several racing disciplines, spanning from racing of common commuter cars to those in racing series such as Super GT and Deutsche Tourenwagen Masters as well as other sports car racing series. To help players acclimate to the simulation style of racing, assists such as an ideal racing line, anti-lock brakes and traction control can be used.

Players can compete in various championships, which are divided based on vehicle manufacturer region, vehicle age, power, drivetrain, racing discipline, and other categories. Each championship consists of multiple races. Additionally exhibition races can be run, which are single events. Awards are generally better with championship races, while exhibitions require less of a time commitment from the player. The game offers both split-screen multiplayer and online play through Xbox Live.

== Development ==
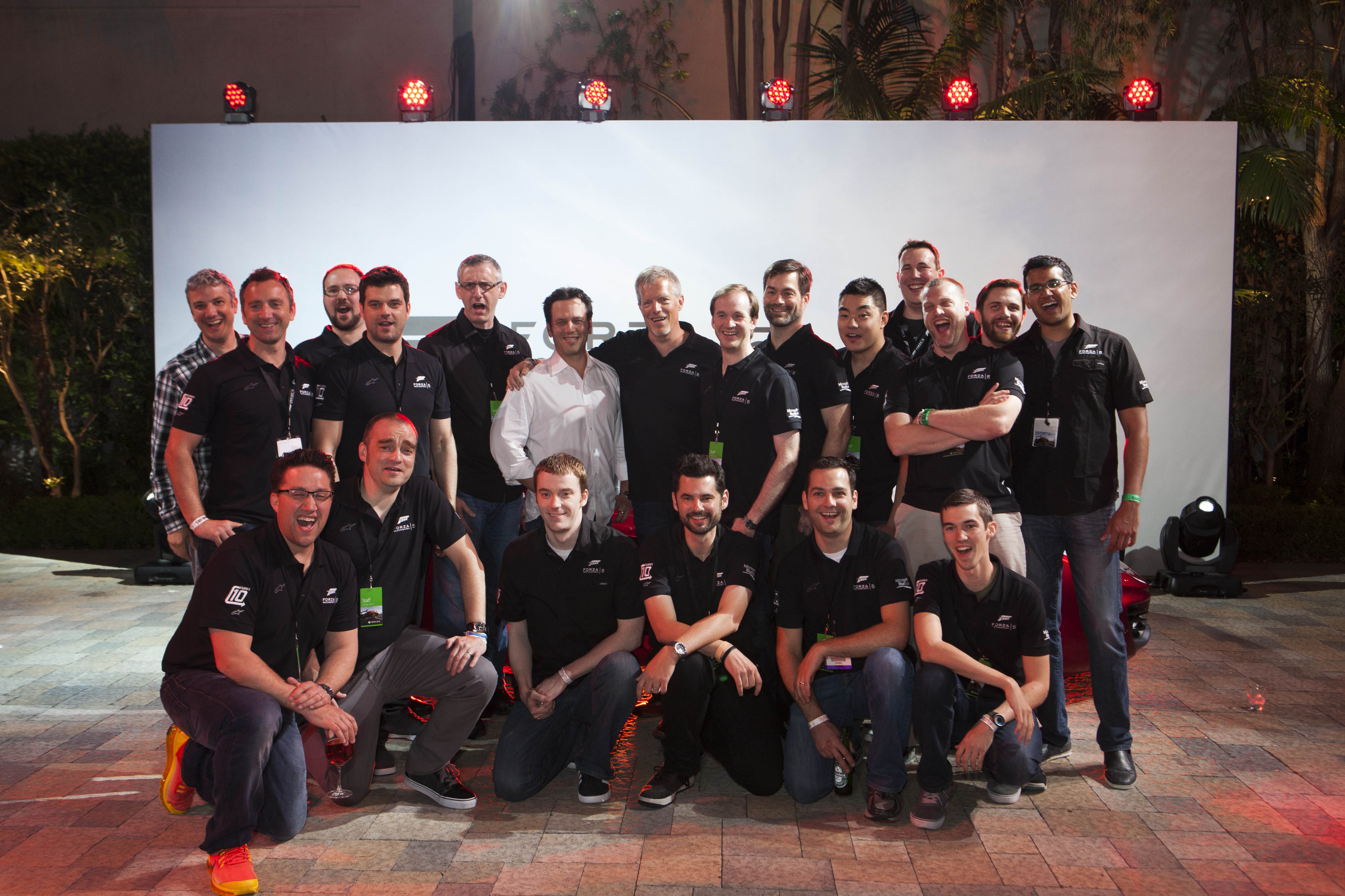
Forza Motorsport 5 team at the Electronic Entertainment Expo 2013 in Los Angeles, California

The game ships with 200 cars from over 50 manufacturers and 17 circuits, including Spa, Bathurst, Yas Marina, and Circuit de la Sarthe. There are monthly car packs, including 10 cars each available to buy as downloadable content (DLC) for the first 8 months after the game's launch. The possibility of tracks, such as Nürburgring, being available to purchase as DLC after the game's launch was considered, but instead Turn 10 Studios has released new tracks as free content for users, including Road America in February 2014, Long Beach in April 2014 and the Nürburgring in June 2014. Silverstone Circuit and the fictional Bernese Alps racetrack, based on the Swiss Alps, were carried over from Forza Motorsport 4.

The sound design team used FMOD Studio to try new techniques for the game. The car audio model accepted inputs such as throttle position, engine load, boost pressure, gear selection, clutch position, and RPM (independent for engine, turbo, supercharger, and transmission). The team hired Skywalker Sound to create an action movie soundscape based on a lap of the Bernese Alps track in Forza Motorsport 4, and as a result tailored the game audio for player engagement versus passive movie watching.

At E3 2013, first-hand gameplay, new features, and cars in "Forza Vista" mode were shown. Also at the event, it was revealed that for the first time in the game's history there would be open-wheel cars including the Dallara DW12 IndyCar and Formula One cars, including the McLaren M23 driven by James Hunt and the Ferrari 312T2 driven by Niki Lauda in the 1976 Formula One season. The Lotus E21 driven by Kimi Räikkönen and Romain Grosjean in the 2013 Formula One Season was also revealed on November 5.

== Soundtrack ==
Lance Hayes, the award-winning composer who had composed the previous two Motorsport installments, had returned to compose his final Forza soundtrack alongside English composer John Broomhall. In contrast to its predecessors, there are no licensed songs from popular artists that play while racing, but instead an original score by Hayes and Broomhall. Also, in contrast with Forza Motorsport 4 and Forza Motorsport 3, the score features an emphasis on orchestration and percussion, in addition to the ambient electronica sound established in previous entries. The soundtrack was released alongside the game itself on November 22, 2013, exclusively as a digital download.

== Reception ==
Reception

Aggregate scores
Aggregator	Score
GameRankings	79.49%
Metacritic	79/100

Review scores
Publication	Score
Edge	7/10
Electronic Gaming Monthly	6.5/10
Eurogamer	7/10
Game Informer	8.75/10
GameRevolution	3.5/5
GamesMaster	73%
GameSpot	9/10
GamesRadar+	4/5
Giant Bomb	3/5
IGN	8.8/10
Official Xbox Magazine (US)	9/10
Polygon	9/10

Forza Motorsport 5 received generally positive reviews, with aggregate review websites GameRankings and Metacritic giving a score of 79.49% and 79 out of 100, respectively. Shaun McInnis of GameSpot said the game was "built on the romantic thrill of motorsport in all its forms, and that love for its subject matter is all but impossible to resist." Luke Reilly of IGN called it "an essential destination for the automobile obsessed" and "a very hard game for a revhead like myself not to love." In his review for Polygon, Arthur Gies praised the game's "aggressive, convincing AI", saying it made "every offline race feel like a multiplayer competition". Gies went on to say that "Turn 10 has charted a course for the future of the series — and created the Xbox One's first must-own game".

However, a number of critics complained about the relative lack of content versus its predecessor, Forza Motorsport 4. Edge noted that the game "has lost some 300 cars, over 20 locations and countless tracks", losing "the variety of racing that made it great" and that it was "a launch game with all the spectacle and disappointment we’ve come to expect from launch games". Matthew Kato of Game Informer called the game's revised career mode "a mistake" and that Forza Motorsport 5 "takes a big step forward only to be held back by what it has removed". Writing for EGM, Ray Carsillo said that while the game "maintains the tradition of providing great control along with some stunningly realistic graphics", ultimately it was "a surprising step backward for the Forza franchise".

On February 18, 2014, Microsoft announced that Forza Motorsport 5 was the fastest-selling racing game in Xbox history. More than a third of Xbox One owners had bought the game. Eurogamer estimated the sales to be around 1.3 million copies. On June 16, 2014, Forza Creative Director Dan Greenawalt announced that half of all Xbox One owners had played the full version of Forza Motorsport 5.

During the 17th Annual D.I.C.E. Awards, the Academy of Interactive Arts & Sciences awarded Forza Motorsport 5 with "Racing Game of the Year", along with receiving a nomination for "Outstanding Achievement in Gameplay Engineering".
