= Xbox 360 Wireless Racing Wheel =

Steering wheel controller for the Xbox 360

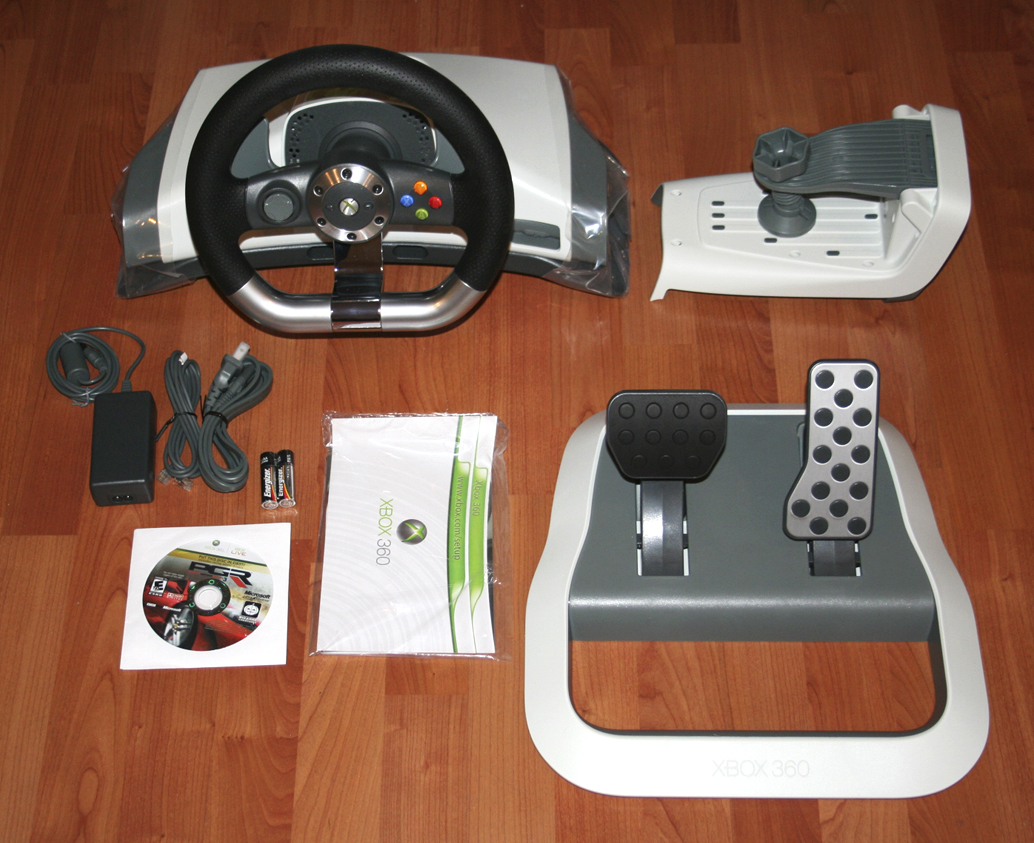
- Xbox 360 Wireless Racing Wheel
- Manufacturer: Microsoft
- Type: Steering wheel controller
- Generation: Seventh generation
- Lifespan: NA: November 2006
- Connectivity: Wireless (2.4 GHz)
- Power: Standard Xbox 360 controller battery (2 AA battery): Standard Xbox 360 controller buttons; 270° steering angle; cockherd paddle shifters; Brake and accelerate pedal; Digital D-pad

The Xbox 360 Wireless Racing Wheel was developed by Microsoft for the Xbox 360 and was introduced at E3 2006. Released in November 2006, the force feedback steering wheel controller includes the standard gamepad buttons along with floor-mounted accelerator and brake pedals. Although the wheel is capable of running truly wirelessly from a standard Xbox 360 battery pack (rechargeable or two AA batteries), use of the force feedback and active resistance features requires an external AC adapter.

The original limited edition of the force feedback wheel included a force-feedback capable version of the racing game Project Gotham Racing 3. This was discontinued in November 2007 when the price of the wheel was dropped to $99.

The wheel was developed in conjunction with the video game Forza Motorsport 2.

== Supported games ==
The following games are "fully supported" with force feedback for Xbox 360:

- Burnout Paradise
- Dirt
- Dirt 2
- Dirt 3
- Daytona USA
- F1 2010
- F1 2011
- F1 2012
- F1 2013
- F1 2014
- Forza Motorsport 2^{†}
- Forza Motorsport 3^{†}
- Forza Motorsport 4
- Forza Horizon
- Forza Horizon 2
- Grid
- Hydro Thunder Hurricane
- Juiced 2: Hot Import Nights
- Midnight Club: Los Angeles
- NASCAR 08
- NASCAR 09
- Need for Speed: Carbon
- Need for Speed: Most Wanted
- Need for Speed: ProStreet
- Need for Speed: Undercover
- Need for Speed: Shift
- Need for Speed: The Run
- Need for Speed: Hot Pursuit
- Project Gotham Racing 3^{†}
- Project Gotham Racing 4^{†}
- Race Pro
- Sega Rally Revo
- Sega Rally Online Arcade
- Stuntman: Ignition
- Superstars V8 Racing
- Test Drive Unlimited (Hardcore mode is recommended)
- Test Drive Unlimited 2
- WRC 2010
- WRC 3: FIA World Rally Championship
- WRC 4: FIA World Rally Championship

† Bundled Xbox 360 race game.

The following games are supported on Windows Vista x64. This does not include force feedback- steering and rumble only:

- Colin McRae: Dirt
- Sega Rally Revo
- Pure
- Burnout Paradise: The Ultimate Box
- Race Driver: Grid - Need to 1.2 version patch

The following original Xbox games are supported. This does not include force feedback- steering and rumble only: Xbox 360 backward compatibility:

- 007: Nightfire (cars only)
- 4x4 EVO 2
- Auto Modellista
- Burnout 2: Point of Impact
- Burnout 3: Takedown
- Colin McRae Rally 04
- Colin McRae Rally 2005
- Crash Nitro Kart
- EA Sports F1 2001
- EA Sports F1 2002
- F1 Career Challenge
- Ford Mustang: The Legend Lives
- Ford vs. Chevy
- Forza Motorsport
- Grand Theft Auto III (cars only)
- Grand Theft Auto: Vice City (cars only)
- Grand Theft Auto: San Andreas (cars only)
- Hot Wheels: Stunt Track Challenge
- IHRA Drag Racing: Sportsman Edition
- IHRA Professional Drag Racing 2005
- IndyCar Series
- IndyCar Series 2005
- Jurassic Park: Operation Genesis (cars only)
- NASCAR 06: Total Team Control (during gameplay, glitches mode on can make car's speed into 300 mph)
- NASCAR Thunder 2002
- NASCAR Thunder 2003
- Need for Speed: Hot Pursuit 2
- Need for Speed: Underground
- Need for Speed: Underground 2
- OutRun 2
- OutRun 2006: Coast 2 Coast
- Project Gotham Racing
- Project Gotham Racing 2
- Rallisport Challenge
- Sega GT 2002
- Sega GT 2002/JSRF Combo pack (Sega GT 2002 only)
- Sega GT Online
- Sonic & Sega All-Stars Racing
- Sonic Heroes (bobsled only)
- Street Racing Syndicate
- Test Drive
- Test Drive: Eve of Destruction
- TOCA Race Driver
- TOCA Race Driver 2
- TOCA Race Driver 3

== Recall ==
On August 22, 2007 an announcement on the official Xbox website stated that Microsoft will retrofit for free all the Wireless Racing Wheels that were manufactured during 2006 and 2007. This is due to a component in the wheel chassis that in rare cases may overheat and release smoke when the AC/DC power supply is used to power up the wheel.

According to Microsoft the retrofit of the Xbox 360 Wireless Racing Wheel is only required on products with SKU numbers 9Z1-00001, 9Z1-00002, 9Z1-00003, 9Z1-00004, 9Z1-00009, 9Z1-00011, 9Z1-00012, 9Z1-00013, 9Z1-00017, 9Z1-00018 and Wheel part numbers X809211-001, X809211-002, X809211-003, X809211-004, X809211-005.

The SKU number can be found on a label on the bottom side of the retail carton and the Wheel part numbers are found on a label on the bottom side of the dashboard assembly. Any SKU or Wheel not included in this list will not require the retrofit.

== Discontinuation and successor ==
The Xbox 360 Wireless Racing Wheel was discontinued in 2007 when the price of the wheel was dropped to $99. It no longer seemed to be supplied to stores, and Microsoft had removed mention of it from the official Xbox web site.

The successor, the Microsoft Xbox 360 Wireless Speed Wheel was released on September 26, 2011.

== See also ==
- Xbox 360 accessories
- Racing video game
