= Forza Motorsport (2023 video game) =

Racing game

- Cover art featuring the 2023 No. 01 Cadillac V-Series.R (foreground) and the 2024 Chevrolet Corvette E-Ray (background)
- Developer: Turn 10 Studios
- Publisher: Xbox Game Studios
- Director: Chris Esaki
- Producer: Brian Yu
- Designer: Bill Giese
- Artist: Matt Flegel
- Composers: Kaveh Cohen; Michael Nielsen
- Series: Forza
- Engine: ForzaTech
- Platforms: Windows; Xbox Series X/S
- Release: October 10, 2023 (Note: October 5, 2023, for Premium Edition and Premium Add-Ons Bundle owners)
- Genre: Sim racing
- Modes: Single-player, multiplayer

Forza Motorsport is a 2023 sim racing video game developed by Turn 10 Studios and published by Xbox Game Studios. It is the eighth and most recent Forza Motorsport title, succeeding Forza Motorsport 7, and the thirteenth entry in the Forza series. Forza Motorsport is a reboot for the titular sub-series, dropping the sequential numbering from past entries' titles.

The game was released for Windows and Xbox Series X/S on October 10, 2023. It received positive reviews from critics upon release and negative reception from players, who criticised the game’s progression system, lack of content, and multiple bugs.

Forza Motorsport is the last game to be developed by Turn 10 Studios, as in July 2025, nearly half of the studio were laid off by Microsoft. Whilst Turn 10 was initially restructured into a support team to assist with Forza Horizon and developments on the ForzaTech engine, the studio would later merge with Playground Games in September 2026.

== Gameplay ==
Forza Motorsport is a sim racing video game. At launch, the game featured more than 500 vehicles and 800 upgrades, as well as 20 newly built tracks. While over 100 of these are new to the series, many of them return from earlier Forza Motorsport games.

Trailer showing the game's graphical capabilities

Forza Motorsport includes elements such as ray tracing in real-time on the track, tire wear, dynamic time of day, damage model changes with better-defined damage, paint chipping and dirt buildup. There are other effects, such as "animated track life", "physically based lighting and volumetric fog effects", and "a fully procedural cloud system". The game also includes a single-player career mode and several online multiplayer modes. Forza Motorsport launched with four DLC packs for players. The game features a progression system inspired by role-playing video games: As players progress, they will unlock "Car Points" for each individual vehicle, allowing players to upgrade and alter its performance such as top speed, acceleration, and handling during racing events.

== Development and release ==
Forza Motorsport was first announced at Xbox Showcase in 2020. Its release date was previously set for 'Spring 2023' but was delayed to a late 2023 launch window. Early access to the game was opened on October 5, 2023, for all Premium Edition and Premium Add-Ons Bundle owners, with it fully releasing on Xbox Series X/S, Windows, and Steam on October 10, 2023. The game was also available to Xbox Game Pass subscribers on release.

Turn 10 Studios described Forza Motorsport as an "evolving racing platform", meaning that they will support the game by adding new cars and events every month, with new tracks being added at regular intervals.

In an interview with GamesRadar+, Chris Esaki, Creative Director at Turn 10 Studios, emphasized the team's commitment to "pushing the boundaries of realism" in Forza Motorsport, and described the game as the "most technically advanced racing game ever made", using the Xbox Series X and Series S consoles to render higher definition graphics than its predecessors.

== Reception ==
Reception

Aggregate scores
Aggregator	Score
Metacritic	(PC) 83/100 (XSXS) 84/100
OpenCritic	84%

Review scores
Publication	Score
GameSpot	9/10
IGN	8/10

According to review aggregator website Metacritic, Forza Motorsport received generally favorable reviews from critics. On OpenCritic, 84% of 115 critics recommended the game.

Luke Reilly from IGN described Forza Motorsport as "the best feeling game in the Motorsport franchise to date". While he lamented the new RPG-styled progression system and the lack of split-screen multiplayer, he praised the online multiplayer modes for being the best in the series, and felt that the game had the potential to become "a seriously rich racing destination over the coming years" if Turn 10 continued to support the game with free updates and post-launch content. Writing for GameSpot, Alessandro Barbosa described the game as a "triumphant return for the simulation racing series". Barbosa liked the RPG-like progression system, adding that it provided the most "rewarding" experience in the franchise. While he noticed that the game had fewer cars and tracks than previous games, he nonetheless described it as "a standout simulation racing experience that looks and sounds stunning, while feeling reliably accurate and satisfying on the tarmac". While he felt that the game lacked variety, especially when compared to the Forza Horizon subseries, he wrote that the game was "a resolutely focused circuit-racing game with real-world motorsport leanings".

Community response to the game was more critical, with criticism focused on the multitude of bugs, the game's progression system and general lack of content compared to previous games in the series. On Steam, the game received "mostly negative" reviews from players.

=== Awards ===
Year	Ceremony	Category	Result	Ref.
2023	Golden Joystick Awards	Ultimate Game of the Year	Nominated	
2023	The Game Awards 2023	Best Sports / Racing Game	Won	
2023	The Game Awards 2023	Innovation in Accessibility	Won	
2024	27th Annual D.I.C.E. Awards	Racing Game of the Year	Won	
2024	20th British Academy Games Awards	Multiplayer	Nominated	

== Future ==
In July 2025, Turn 10 Studios was reported to have lost almost half of its then-current workforce amidst layoffs being conducted at Microsoft Gaming ahead of the new financial year. Shortly thereafter, reports anticipated that the developer would be reorganized into a support studio for future Forza Horizon entries. This was later confirmed in a blog post by Turn 10 Studios in December 2025, which announced that Forza Motorsport would receive no further content updates, though its servers would remain active. While this concludes active development for the current title, Microsoft Gaming leadership has clarified that the Forza Motorsport franchise remains a parked asset rather than a discontinued one, leaving the series long-term future open for future strategic re-engagement. In September 2026, Turn 10 Studios merged with Playground Games to support development on Forza Horizon and Fable as part of Xbox's structural reassessment. The following month, Turn 10 studio head and Forza Motorsport creator Dan Greenawalt left Microsoft.
