= Playground Games =

British video game developer

Playground Games Limited
- Type: Subsidiary
- Industry: Video games
- Founded: 2010; 16 years ago
- Founders: Gavin Raeburn; Trevor Williams; Ralph Fulton
- Headquarters: Leamington Spa, England
- Number of locations: 2 (2026)
- Key people: Trevor Williams (studio head); Ralph Fulton (CCO)
- Products: Forza Horizon series; Fable
- Number of employees: 455 (2024)
- Parent: Xbox Game Studios (2018–present)
- Subsidiaries: Playground Games Redmond
- Website: playground-games.com

Playground Games Limited is a British video game developer based in Leamington Spa, England. It is known for developing the Forza Horizon series, which is part of the larger Forza franchise. In 2018, Playground Games became part of Microsoft Studios (now known as Xbox Game Studios). They are also developing the next game in the Fable series.

== History ==
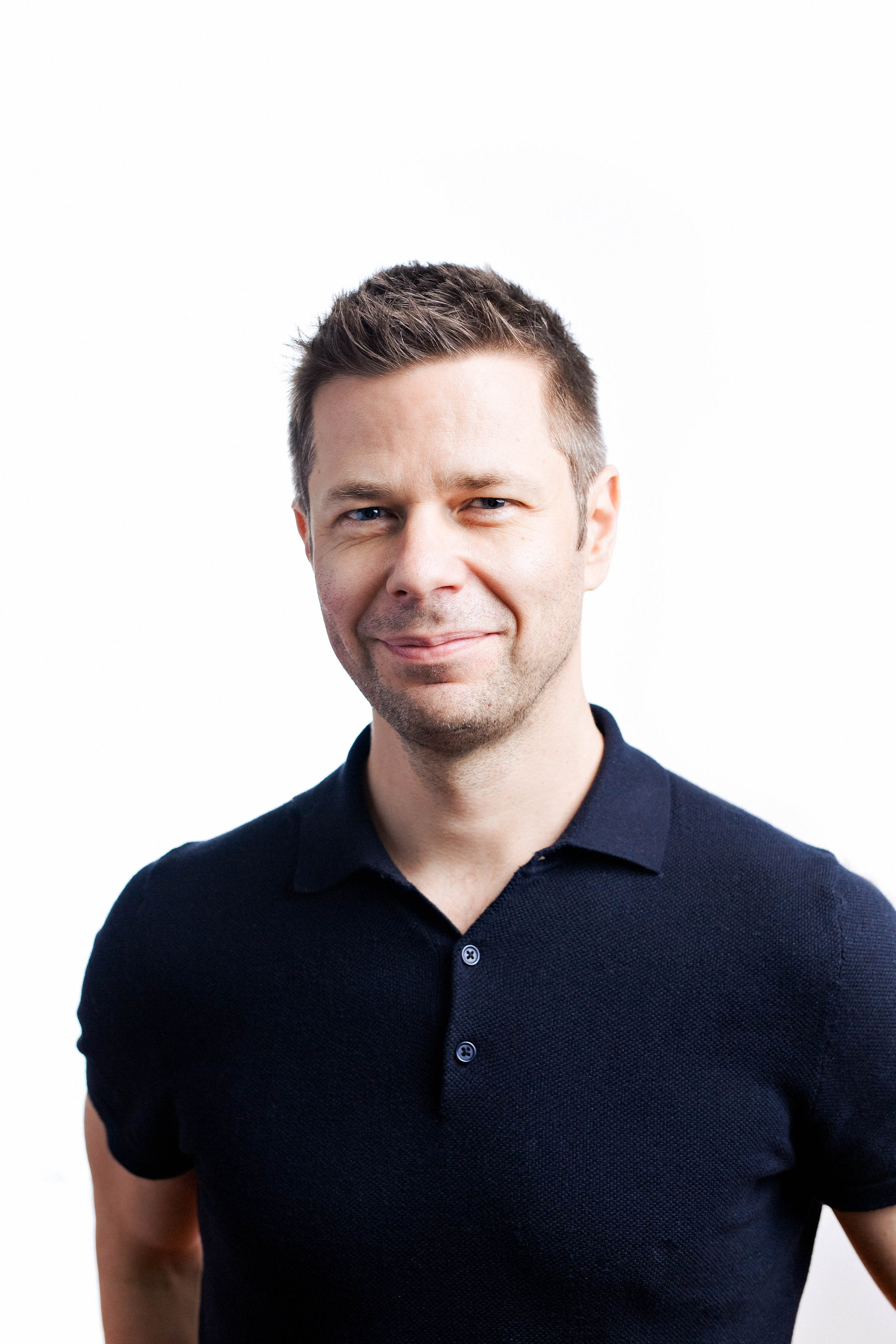
Gavin Raeburn, one of the Playground Games co-founders

Playground Games was founded by Gavin Raeburn, Trevor Williams, and Ralph Fulton; the studio was announced in November 2009, with its opening scheduled for early 2010. Playground Games announced its first project, Forza Horizon, in 2012. The title was developed in collaboration with Turn 10 Studios and published by Microsoft Studios for Xbox 360 in October that year. The studio released Forza Horizon 2 on Xbox 360 and Xbox One in September 2014, and Forza Horizon 3 on Xbox One and Microsoft Windows in September 2016.

In February 2014, Playground Games announced that it was forming a new development team focused on mobile games. In February 2017, the studio detailed plans to open a second studio, focusing on a non-racing open-world video game project. In November, it announced it had leased St. Albans House in Leamington Spa, which would provide the new studio with more than 17,000 square feet of office space. Expected headcounts for both studios were in excess of 200 people. In 2024, a third studio was opened in Leamington Spa to assist with the development of Fable.

=== Acquisition by Microsoft ===
At E3 2018, Microsoft announced it had acquired Playground Games, which became part of Microsoft Studios (now known as Xbox Game Studios). At the same time, Microsoft Studios also announced Forza Horizon 4, which would be released on 2 October 2018, and that the studio was working on an unannounced AAA Open-World Action RPG project, later revealed to be in the Fable franchise.

In January 2022, it was reported that co-founder and studio director Gavin Raeburn left Playground Games to open his own studio, while GM Trevor Williams replaced him as studio head.

In September 2026, Microsoft announced that Playground Games and Turn 10 Studios would be merged into one studio focusing on both Forza and Fable, as part of a restructuring within Xbox Game Studios.

== Games developed ==
Year	Title	Platform(s)
2012	Forza Horizon	Xbox 360
2014	Forza Horizon 2	Xbox 360, Xbox One
2016	Forza Horizon 3	Windows, Xbox One
2018	Forza Horizon 4	Windows, Xbox One, Xbox Series X/S
2021	Forza Horizon 5	Windows, Xbox One, Xbox Series X/S, PlayStation 5
2026	Forza Horizon 6	Windows, Xbox Series X/S, PlayStation 5
2027	Fable	Windows, Xbox Series X/S, PlayStation 5
