= Claudio Pelissero =

Italian musician

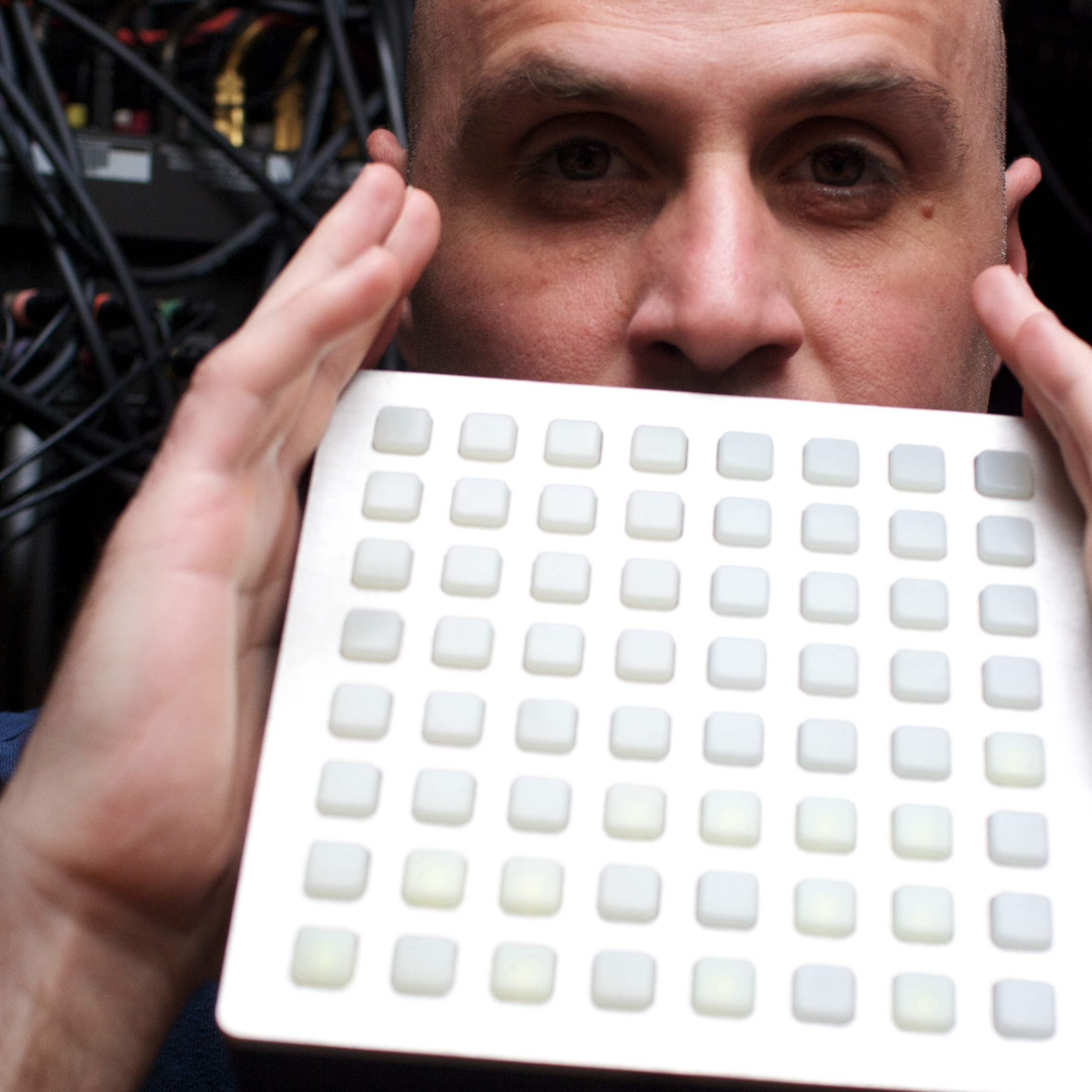
- Italian composer Claudio Pelissero in his studio in Milan.

Background information
- Also known as: Claud9
- Born: Claudio Maino Mario
- Genres: Soundtrack
- Occupation: Music Composer
- Years active: 1994–present
- Website: www.claudiopelissero.com

Claudio Pelissero is an Italian music composer and producer of original soundtracks for film and television and, under the pseudonym Claud9, of electronic music. In 2000, he composed the original soundtrack for the motion picture Venti winning the award for the best original score at the Brooklyn International Film Festival. In 2013 he composed the original theme for the ESPN Broadcast Open NBA Finals and the original soundtrack for the documentary, All I Can, produced by Sherpas Cinema. He is the composer of two famous electronic compositions "Cygnes" and "Rain" released by Armada Music and Black Hole Recordings and are part of two popular and best seller compilation albums : "Cygnes" - A State of Trance 2008 and "Rain" - Toronto '09. The composition "Cygnes" is also included in the soundtrack of the bestseller video game Forza Motorsport 3. In 2010 he composed the original soundtrack for the film, Maledimiele (published by Warner/Chappell Music) presented at the Venice Film Festival. In 2013 his composition "Transformations" is used for the promotional trailer of Beyoncé world tour Mrs. Carter Show World Tour.

In 2014 his compositions "ION" and "BEAST" have been used for the promotional trailer of the video game Call of Duty: Ghosts produced by Activision.
