= Studio manager =

Job title in various media-related professions

Studio manager, studio director, or studio head is a job title in various media-related professions, including design, advertising, and broadcasting.

== Design and advertising ==
A design or advertising studio manager's responsibilities typically include traffic management, ensuring all briefs are dispatched in the studio according to a designer's skills and strengths and that all work is delivered promptly and on deadline to the relevant people.

The following are a studio manager's responsibilities:

- Workload dispatch
- Compiling studio schedules for senior management meetings
- Compiling Road map for projects
- Constant update of Studio schedules
- Project quality control and assessment
- Project review and analysis
- Developing project Briefs
- Consolidating client needs
- Prompt timesheet collection
- Understanding of how deadlines work

== Television and radio ==
In a broadcasting context, a studio manager, or SM, fulfills an operational role in radio broadcasting to enable and ensure programmes are produced to a high technical standard.

Principally, SMs are involved in the operation of studio equipment. This generally encompasses a mixing desk, alongside ancillary equipment such as ISDN codecs, playback and recording devices, and telephone and VoIP adapters.

A studio manager's core function is usually to ensure the programme is correctly 'balanced'. For speech programmes, this generally means each contributor should be heard with the same perceived loudness. A desirable music balance reflects the sound of a performance; for an orchestral rendition, each instrument ought to be heard at the correct relative volume and, for stereo programmes, at the 'correct' position in the orchestra.

Within the BBC, studio managers are used extensively across news, drama, and live music output.

A studio manager might also be known as a desk driver, technical operator, TechOp, or facilitator, particularly outside of the BBC. For a period around 1970 the BBC used the term Programme Operations Assistant, or POA.
