= Forza Motorsport (2005 video game) =

Racing game

- Cover art featuring an Acura NSX and a Nissan 350Z
- Developer: Turn 10 Studios
- Publisher: Microsoft Game Studios
- Director: Andrew Kertesz
- Designer: Dan Greenawalt
- Programmer: Garrett Young
- Artist: John Wendl
- Composer: Tom Holkenborg
- Series: Forza
- Platform: Xbox
- Release: NA: May 3, 2005; EU: May 13, 2005
- Genre: Racing simulation
- Modes: Single-player, multiplayer

Forza Motorsport is a 2005 simulation racing video game developed by Turn 10 Studios and published by Microsoft Game Studios for the Xbox gaming system. The word Forza is Italian for strength. The game is the first installment in the Forza series, which has continued on Microsoft's subsequent consoles, the Xbox 360, Xbox One, and Xbox Series X/S. It features over 200 cars and multiple real world and fictional race courses. It also featured online multiplayer via Xbox Live. It is compatible on the Xbox 360 via backwards compatibility. Forza Motorsport received universal acclaim according to the review aggregation website Metacritic, and received a Gold sales award from the Entertainment and Leisure Software Publishers Association (ELSPA), indicating sales of at least 200,000 copies in the United Kingdom. The NPD Group reported that in its release month the game sold over 100,000 copies in North America.

== Gameplay ==
The first installment in the franchise, Forza Motorsport was also the only title in the series to be released on the original Xbox console.

Forza Motorsport is a simulation racing video game. Players compete in events around the globe using real licensed cars on a variety of real world and fictional courses. It features an arcade mode, meant more for quickplay of races, and a career mode, which is focused on long-term play. Career mode spans several racing disciplines, spanning from racing of common commuter cars to those in racing series such as Super GT and Deutsche Tourenwagen Masters as well as other sports car racing series. To help players acclimate to the simulation style of racing, assists such as an ideal racing line, anti-lock brakes and traction control can be used. There are 231 cars in Forza Motorsport ranging from a Honda Civic to supercars such as the Enzo Ferrari and Le Mans race prototypes such as the Audi R8. There are nine classes of cars, spanning standard production vehicles to sports and high performance cars to purpose-built race cars. Each car can be upgraded and tuned with a large number of extras and parts.

Vehicles can also be customized by the player, both visually and performance-wise. In addition to adding body parts such as hood scoops and body kits, players can add multiple layers of decals to the vehicles. Upgrades are separated into three categories: engine/power, appearance/aerodynamics and chassis/drivetrain. There is a wide range of tuning available including tire pressure, which changes during races due to temperature, downforce, gear ratios and limited-slip differential. Vehicles can be realistically damaged, from both a cosmetic and a performance standpoint. This changes the way the game is played, as collisions with barriers and other cars will alter the car's handling, top speed and acceleration. More noticeably, spoilers can be knocked off cars, bumpers dangle from their supports, paint can be scraped off and windows can be smashed completely.

The game contains a mix of licensed, street, point to point and original circuits. Real world tracks Road Atlanta, Silverstone, Laguna Seca, Tsukuba, Road America, and Nürburgring Nordschleife were licensed and included. Furthermore, the game's Blue Mountains Raceway circuit is heavily comparable in track layout, characteristics and backgrounds with the Mount Panorama Circuit in Bathurst. In addition to these, Forza Motorsport also contains a wide variety of autocross, oval, and dragstrip courses. Each of these could be played online through the original Xbox Live service or through System Link, which allows multiple Xbox consoles to be interconnected through a local area network. Network multiplayer is no longer available via Xbox Live, which was discontinued by Microsoft on April 15, 2010; however, Forza Motorsport is playable online using replacement online servers for the original Xbox called Insignia. The game is backwards compatible, and can be played on the Xbox 360 excluding online play.

== Development ==
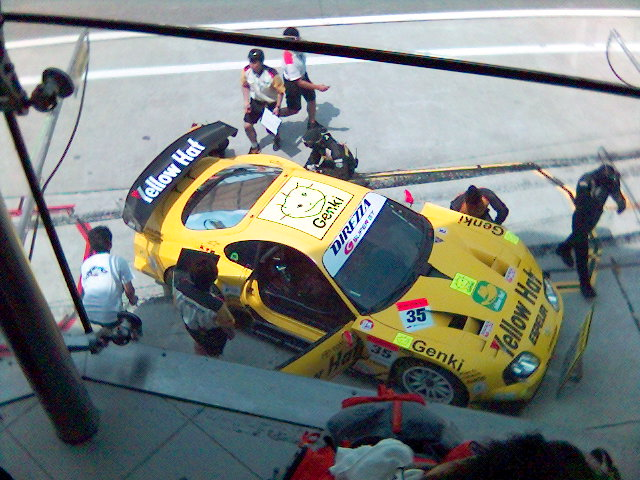
In addition to several production cars, Forza Motorsport features cars from various racing disciplines, such as this 2005 Yellow Hat Toyota Supra, which competed in the Japanese Super GT racing series.

Forza Motorsport was announced at Electronic Entertainment Expo (E3) 2004. Development of the game took over two and a half years. The release was delayed at three times, with GameSpot reporting the first delay from a December 2004 release to February 2005. It would later be delayed until April 2005. It was delayed one last time, and the game was released May 3, 2005 in North America and May 13, 2005, in Europe. The game was created with the intent to compete with Sony's popular Gran Turismo franchise, with Microsoft director Kiki Wolfkill stating, "we are targeting Gran Turismo with this game on Xbox, and I think we've been very focused on that. We have a lot of respect for Gran Turismo, which helps drive that desire to beat them."

To promote Forza and other Xbox Live titles Microsoft teamed up with EB Games to provide 25 kiosks with games that could be played online through the service. Forza was the first of these titles to be displayed and playable on the kiosks. It was shown at multiple events during its development. Following E3 2004, it was shown at GameRiot, a traveling game event. It further was featured at the 2004 Tokyo Game Show.

It was developed to allow for multiple Xbox consoles to be linked directly and/or to be played online via Xbox Live. A customization system was developed where players can create custom layers over sections of the car, similar to layers in professional image programs such as Adobe Photoshop. Objects can be change in shape, scale and color, which allowed for players to create custom designs and liveries. Each car is divided into six sections, and each section can handle up to 100 layers. A custom soundtrack was composed by DJ Junkie XL, which features 56 original music tracks.

The game began with a team of only 20 people and was, according to Turn 10 studio head Dan Greenawalt, originally an excellent simulator, but not as fun as a game. He stated that the team then worked "to make the physics more accessible, more handle-able. So we started on the game." Greenawalt further noted that he wanted it to be a "car collecting game." To aid with that Turn 10 hired a designer formerly of Nintendo's Pokémon team and said that the team "played a lot of Animal Crossing and Diablo II." It was developed to display in high definition at 480p, and supports Dolby Digital 5.1 surround sound. The team developed drivatar technology, which is an artificial intelligence avatar for the player which learns from the players habits. The player can assign the drivatar to compete in races which they do not wish to, such as endurance races.

Like the majority of major racing simulators, Forza Motorsport is designed to calculate a car's performance in real time using physical data (for example, the weight of a car's engine, its drag coefficient, etc.), consequently causing the cars to mimic the handling characteristics of their real-life counterparts. In 2005, Popular Science magazine tested this effect by inviting professional race car driver Gunnar Jeannette and a car enthusiast without major professional motorsports experience to drive identical cars on an identical track in both Forza Motorsport and the real world. Aside from several cars which were either in challenging physical condition or lacking identical setups, Jeannette's track times matched closely from his performance on the real track and in virtual reality. The amateur's real world times in all of the cars were roughly identical despite a 16-second spread between fastest and slowest in Forza, which he attributed to his fear of the consequences of driving too hard causing him to drive more slowly in the faster cars.

== Reception ==
Reception

Aggregate score
Aggregator	Score
Metacritic	92/100

Review scores
Publication	Score
Edge	8/10
Electronic Gaming Monthly	9.5/10/10
Eurogamer	9/10
Famitsu	31/40
Game Informer	8.5/10
GamePro	5/5
GameRevolution	A−
GameSpot	9.2/10
GameSpy	4.5/5
GameTrailers	8.9/10
GameZone	9.5/10
IGN	9.5/10
Official Xbox Magazine (US)	9/10
Detroit Free Press	3/4
The Times	5/5

Forza Motorsport received a Gold sales award from the Entertainment and Leisure Software Publishers Association (ELSPA), indicating sales of at least 200,000 copies in the United Kingdom. The NPD Group reported that in its release month the game sold over 100,000 copies in North America.

Forza Motorsport received universal acclaim according to the review aggregation website Metacritic. The game was also featured in the June 2004 issue of Popular Science. Reviewers praised the game's advantages over Gran Turismo 4. Che Chou of 1UP.com commented that Forza was the "most realistic console racer ever made". GameSpot's Brian Ekberg noted how well the game balanced accessibility and pleasing genre fans. Kristan Reed of Eurogamer liked the game's online integration. In Japan, Famitsu gave it a score of one eight, two sevens, and one nine for a total of 31 out of 40.

Maxim gave the game all five stars, saying, "Microsoft Game Studios' answer to Sony's automotive masterpiece is simple–add online play and program cars that take realistic damage." The Times also gave it all five stars, saying that "the really ingenious element is the Drivatar AI, in which the computer learns your driving technique." The Sydney Morning Herald gave it four-and-a-half stars out of five, saying, "Car handling is demanding, but beginners can instantly have fun, thanks to helpful driving assists and generous early prizes." However, Jim Schaefer of Detroit Free Press gave it three stars out of four, saying, "man, is this game difficult, even on the easy setting. I prefer games with unreal speed, power boosts and shortcuts. I just couldn't seem to get a grip on Forza until I played around with different cars, perusing the six classes, from standard production cars like your basic Honda Civic to race cars like the Audi R8."

During the 9th Annual Interactive Achievement Awards, the Academy of Interactive Arts & Sciences nominated Forza Motorsport for "Racing Game of the Year".
