= Forza Horizon 5 =

2021 video game

- Cover art featuring a 2021 Mercedes-AMG One (foreground) and two 2021 Ford Bronco Badlands (background)
- Developer: Playground Games (Note: Additional work provided by Sumo Digital. PlayStation 5 version by Panic Button.)
- Publisher: Xbox Game Studios
- Director: Mike Brown
- Producers: Adam Askew; Andy Ward
- Designers: Ryan Greene; Ben Thaker-Fell
- Programmers: Alan Roberts; Matt Craven
- Artist: Don Arceta
- Series: Forza
- Platforms: Windows; Xbox One; Xbox Series X/S; PlayStation 5
- Release: Windows, Xbox One, Xbox Series X/S; 9 November 2021 (Note: The Premium Edition of the game was released on 5 November 2021, while the Standard and Deluxe editions were released on 9 November 2021.); PlayStation 5; 29 April 2025 (Note: The Premium Edition of the game was released on 25 April 2025, while the Standard and Deluxe editions were released on 29 April 2025.)
- Genre: Racing
- Modes: Single-player, multiplayer

Forza Horizon 5 is a 2021 racing game developed by Playground Games and published by Xbox Game Studios. It is the fifth Forza Horizon title, following Forza Horizon 4, and the twelfth main instalment in the Forza series. The game is set in a fictionalised representation of Mexico. It was released on 9 November 2021 for Windows, Xbox One, and Xbox Series X/S. It marks the final mainline Forza instalment released on Xbox One. The game was also released for PlayStation 5 on 29 April 2025, the first instance of a mainline Forza game being released on a non-Microsoft platform.

Forza Horizon 5 was a commercial success upon release; it launched to over 10 million players in its first week, the biggest-ever launch for an Xbox Game Studios game. The game received critical acclaim, winning IGN's Game of the Year award, three jury-voted awards at the Game Awards 2021, tying with It Takes Two for most wins, and Racing Game of the Year at the 25th Annual D.I.C.E. Awards. A sequel, Forza Horizon 6, launched on 19 May 2026.

== Gameplay ==
In-game screenshot showing the player racing a Lamborghini Diablo SV against a Porsche 911 in a street race during a Horizon story

Forza Horizon 5 is a racing game set in an open world environment based in a fictional representation of Mexico. The game has the largest map in the entire Forza Horizon series, being 50% larger than its predecessor, Forza Horizon 4, while also having the highest point in the Horizon series. The map was described by creative director Mike Brown as one of the most diverse Forza Horizon maps the team has built. The map contains an active caldera volcano, jungles and beaches, ancient Mayan temples, and towns and cities such as Guanajuato. Players can explore the open world freely, though they can also compete in multiplayer races and complete the campaign mode. Both the cars featured in the game and the player character can be extensively customised. Players are able to create custom liveries and tunes for cars, and perform engine swaps, drivetrain swaps, or install body kits on certain vehicles. The game is the first in the franchise to support ray tracing on cars. It introduces a new weather system (local weather) in which players can visit one side of the map and can visibly see a storm. Because Mexico is such a vast nation with such a wide range of elevations, multiple climates would appear in the game at around the same time. The four seasons still exist but would affect the eleven unique biomes around the map. For example, in the dry season, dust storms will appear, while tropical storms occur throughout the fall storm season. Another detail is in the jungle, in which the environment would now react to the weather; an example of this is leaves flying everywhere.

Forza Horizon 5 also introduces a new Horizon Arcade. This consists of a series of mini-multiplayer games strewn across the map. One of these mini-multiplayer games is called "Piñata pop" where the Horizon Festival's cargo plane drops piñatas. The goal is to pop as many piñatas as they can with the help of other players. It also introduces the "EventLab", a toolset in which players can create custom games, races, and more depending on their personal preference. A new feature called "Forza Link" was introduced. According to Brown, it is an AI assistant that tracks the current statuses of players, helping them to link with other players online and play together. Forza Link can also link players' GPS systems if they accept the invitation from another player. Accolades, new to the Forza Horizon series, allow players to collect points and prizes for completing certain tasks. Some vehicles can only be unlocked through the completion of the Accolades. There are over 1,800 accolades for the player to achieve.

The Eliminator battle royale game mode introduced in Forza Horizon 4 returns, albeit with players starting in a 1963 Volkswagen Beetle rather than a 1965 Mini. The world is designed for the mode unlike the previous game, which received The Eliminator after launch. Winning The Eliminator is so difficult that TrueAchievements has 12 guides for the associated achievement, the most of the 164 Forza Horizon 5 achievements. As in the previous game, players can buy in-game houses ranging from small beachside cabanas to even a hotel, which can unlock rewards such as Wheelspins and the right to Fast Travel. The game features 799 obtainable licensed vehicles as of May 2026, however it features three additional cars that were obtainable with collabs with OPI Products (2017 Ford GT “OPI Edition”) and Oreo (2009 Pagani Zonda Cinque Roadster “Oreo Edition”) an additional was obtainable with the Forza Horizon 5 Xbox Wireless Controller.

Due to licensing issues, vehicles from Alfa Romeo, Fiat (including Abarth marque) and Lancia were not present in the base game. Prior to the release of Forza Horizon 5, the Stratos HF Stradale was shown in a video covering car audio but it was scrapped in the released game. On 17 July 2023, it was announced that the Italian brands would return to the Forza series in the Series 24 update of the game on 17 August 2023.

=== Content and gameplay updates ===
Forza Horizon 5 has seen many content updates and bug fixes since its release. Monthly content updates include new cars, collectibles, horns, clothing, etc. These updates typically have a specific theme; for example, the Series 2 update in December 2021 was based around Christmas. Many updates also include series-specific map changes, for example, the Series 5 update introduced a stunt park located in the stadium on the map. The game is the first in the franchise to introduce new map changes, aside from seasons.

On 1 March 2022, interpreter videos in a picture-in-picture format for cinematics were added for both American Sign Language and British Sign Language.

The Series 13 update, released on 11 October 2022, celebrated the tenth anniversary of the Forza Horizon series, adding new content to the game in celebration. This included a new radio station titled "Horizon Mixtape", featuring a total of fifteen music tracks from the previous four entries (six tracks available from the start, five unlockable tracks via accolades by completing each chapter of the Horizon Story "Horizon Origins", and four tracks unlockable via completing limited-time seasonal championships in the Festival Playlist) along with recreations of key moments of the five games' initial drive sequences in the new Horizon Story "Horizon Origins"—with Horizon Bass Arena DJ and Horizon Mixtape host Scott Tyler (voiced by Ronan Summers), the only Forza Horizon series character to have appeared in every game so far, joining the player—the return of Midnight Battles from Forza Horizon 3, and new achievements, accolades, and badges. Each of the previous four entries' title screens was also recreated by Playground Games within the game world of Forza Horizon 5, with each season (week) of Series 13 using a recreated title screen corresponding to a different game; Forza Horizon in summer, Forza Horizon 2 in autumn, Forza Horizon 3 in winter, and Forza Horizon 4 in spring.

The Series 14 update, released on 10 November 2022, added a new Horizon Story featuring the members of Donut Media. In November 2022, after a money-making exploit was discovered in the game's Super7 mode, Playground Games disabled the game's auction house and later released a patch to fix the exploit. However, they announced that the auction house would remain closed for the time being to rebalance the game's economy. In June 2023, a 1956 Chevrolet Corvette and 2022 GMC Hummer EV pickup featuring details inspired by the film Barbie was added to the game as part of a collaboration with Xbox Game Studios and Mattel in advance of the film's release.

==== Expansions ====
The game's first expansion, Forza Horizon 5: Hot Wheels, a follow-up to a similar expansion for Forza Horizon 3, was released on 19 July 2022. This announcement was accidentally leaked via a Steam listing three days before its official announcement. The game's second expansion, Forza Horizon 5: Rally Adventure, was released on 29 March 2023. It includes a new map, a variety of off-road vehicles such as trophy trucks and buggies, and a new career mode. A car pack expansion of the game titled Forza Horizon 5: Fast X – Car Pack was featured on 5 December 2023, featuring the vehicles from the 2023 film Fast X, the tenth installment of the Fast & Furious franchise and the second of the series since Forza Horizon 2 in 2015.

== Development ==
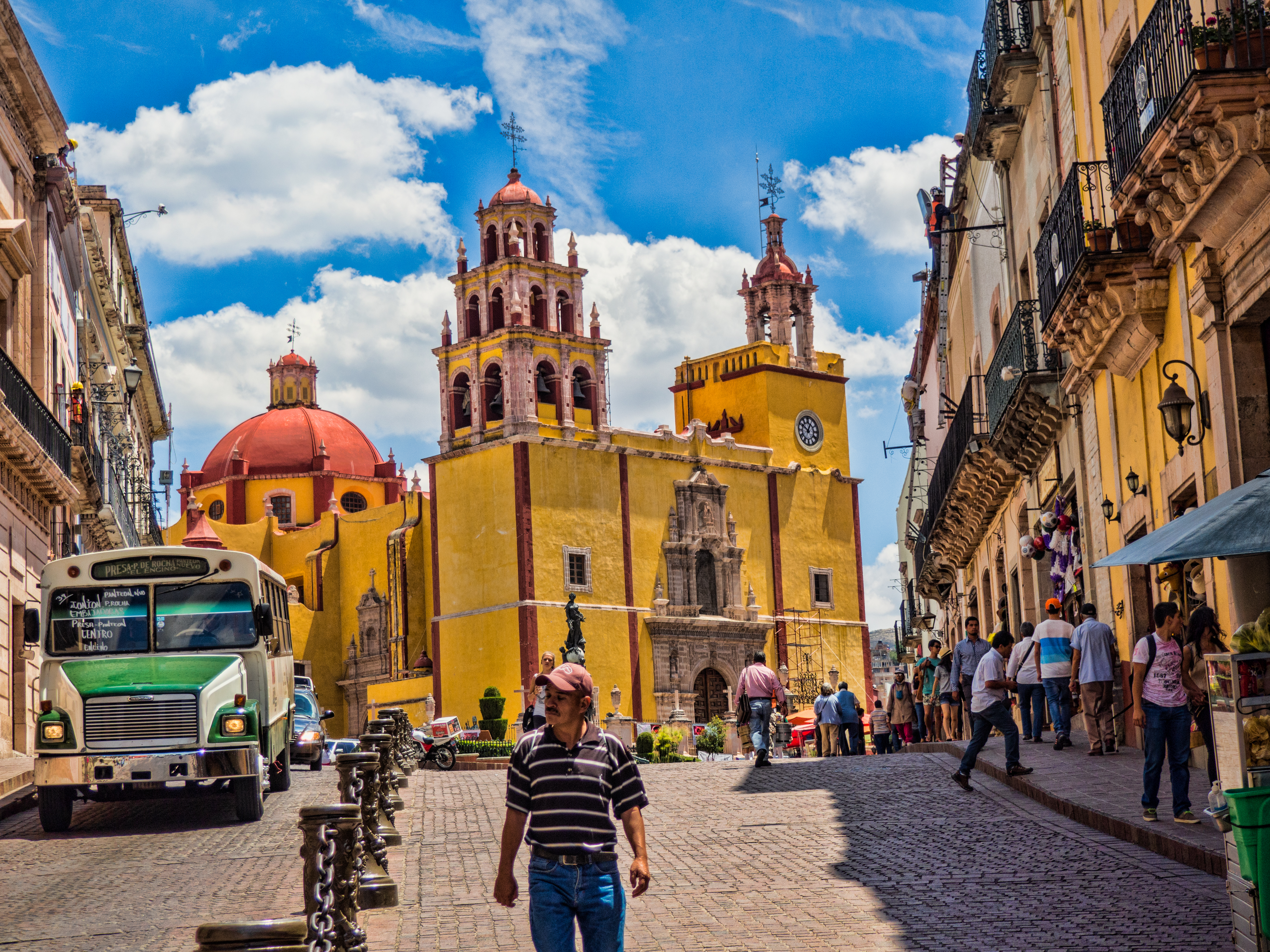
The narrow streets and plazas of Guanajuato are used as a setting for urban races.

Forza Horizon 5 was developed by Playground Games. The goal for the team was to create a game whose scale was significantly larger than its predecessors. The team chose Mexico as the game's setting due to its diverse and varied landscape. The team partnered with Mexican artists to create the in-game murals, and Mexican musicians to create the in-game soundtracks. It also sent a team to visit Mexico to capture real-world light and sky data. The game utilised photogrammetry data extensively in order to make the game's virtual environment to look similar to its real-life counterpart. An example of this is the rocks in the side of the caldera volcano where they can be viewed with such detail. Individual objects, such as the needles of cholla cacti, can also be displayed by the game (although this is only available for the Xbox Series consoles as of now).

To achieve a more authentic sound in Forza Horizon 5, Playground Games transitioned from traditional looping audio to a granular synthesis system. This overhaul required a massive, ground-up recording effort where the team captured over 320 unique engine sweeps—tracking every note from idle to redline and back to a standstill. To ensure high-fidelity results, they utilized flat-response microphones with specialized padding to prevent clipping from loud exhausts, while also employing stereo and ambisonic mics centrally mounted in cockpits to capture immersive cabin acoustics. Collaborating with audio outsourcing firms, the developers created a completely bespoke library of engines, ambient environments, and collisions, ensuring that every sound in the game was recorded specifically for this title rather than being sourced from existing libraries The soundtrack can be output through Dolby Atmos.

Forza Horizon 5 was announced during Microsoft and Bethesda's showcase at E3 2021. Its cover art was revealed at Xbox's Gamescom presentation in 2021 and shows a 2021 Mercedes-AMG One in the foreground and two 2021 Ford Bronco Badlands in the background. The game was released for Windows, Xbox One, and Xbox Series X and Series S on 9 November 2021. A PlayStation 5 version developed by Panic Button was released in 2025, marking the first Forza title to release on a non-Xbox home console as well as on a PlayStation console.

== Reception ==
Reception

Aggregate score
Aggregator	Score
Metacritic	(PC) 91/100 (XSXS) 92/100 (PS5) 92/100

Review scores
Publication	Score
Destructoid	8.5/10
Electronic Gaming Monthly	4/5
Game Informer	9.5/10
GameSpot	9/10
GamesRadar+	5/5
IGN	10/10
PC Gamer (US)	90/100
VentureBeat	4/5
VG247	5/5
VideoGamer.com	8/10

Forza Horizon 5 received "universal acclaim" according to review aggregator website Metacritic.

Game Informer appreciated the social interactions in the game, especially the score comparisons, "More times than I could count, I noticed my friend hit a higher top speed, causing me to turn around and try the challenge again". Ars Technica liked the visuals of the title, praising how it looked "next-gen", "I seriously cannot keep track of how many times FH5 made my eyes bulge. The game takes special care to emphasize massive vistas ... with screen-bursting HDR effects doing wonders for a richly saturated canvas of cities, sunsets, and scenery". While criticizing the car handling for making the game too easy, Rock Paper Shotgun enjoyed the new additions to the formula like the EventLab creator and Super7 events, "If you’ve played a Forza Horizon game before then you might feel a slight sense of deja vu, but you won’t care as the formula has been perfected at last". Eurogamer praised Forza Horizon 5's open world of Mexico, writing that "The map is an absolute wonder, backed by a game engine which can deliver staggering views across the whole thing from the summit of the volcano that towers over it. The environments are rich and saturated with colour and atmosphere, from humid swamps to arid dunes, from deep, verdant canyons to pastel-striped barrios".

Polygon liked the settings to tune difficulty and handling, but felt the game bombarded the player with too many events and activities at once, "I feel constantly pinged with mentions and suggestions, from all directions, like two teenagers are blowing up my DMs". The Verge felt the progression systems were less confusing overall compared to 3, and praised how the player could choose what to do next, "You’re able to choose which specific types of events to unlock as you progress ... I feel like if I stopped playing the game and came back to it weeks later, I’d have a much better sense of what I’d been doing".

The game was selected as IGN's Game of the Year.

=== Commercial performance ===
Before the game's release on 9 November, over 1.2 million players had accessed the game by buying either the premium edition of the game or the premium add-ons bundle as an Xbox Game Pass subscriber, with Video Games Chronicle estimating gross revenue between $54 million and $118 million before release. The game also reached #1 on the Steam weekly charts for the week of 1 to 7 November 2021. Phil Spencer, head of Xbox, announced on 9 November that more than 4.5 million people have played the game in less than 24 hours after launch, the largest launch for an Xbox Game Studios game, while it also held three times more concurrent players than Forza Horizon 4. On 18 November, the official Forza Horizon Twitter account announced that over ten million people have played the game during its first week of release, the largest number of players for a game's first week in the Xbox brand's history. Writing for Forbes, Erik Kain attributes the game's success to its at-launch availability on Xbox Game Pass, cross-platform play between Xbox One, Xbox Series X/S, and PC, its cloud gaming support via Xbox Cloud Gaming, and the high quality of the game itself. On 9 January 2022, two months after its release, the game passed the 15 million player mark, breaking the record for the previous game in the series in less than a year since it was released. The game attracted more than 20 million players seven months after its initial release.

Following its PlayStation 5 release, it became the second best-selling game of April 2025 in the US. As of April 2026, the PS5 version sold around 5.8 million units.

=== Awards and accolades ===
Year	Award	Category	Result	Ref.
2021
2021	The Game Awards 2021	Best Audio Design	Won	
2021	The Game Awards 2021	Innovation in Accessibility	Won	
2021	The Game Awards 2021	Best Sports/Racing Game	Won	
2021	The Game Awards 2021	Players' Voice	Nominated	
2021	Steam Awards	Outstanding Visual Style	Won	
2022
2022	22nd Game Developers Choice Awards	Best Audio	Nominated	
2022	22nd Game Developers Choice Awards	Best Technology	Nominated	
2022	22nd Game Developers Choice Awards	Best Visual Art	Nominated	
2022	22nd Game Developers Choice Awards	Game of the Year	Nominated	
2022	25th Annual D.I.C.E. Awards	Racing Game of the Year	Won	
2022	25th Annual D.I.C.E. Awards	Outstanding Achievement in Audio Design	Nominated	
2022	25th Annual D.I.C.E. Awards	Outstanding Technical Achievement	Nominated	
2022	Visual Effects Society Awards	Outstanding Visual Effects in a Real-Time Project	Nominated	
2022	18th British Academy Games Awards	Best Game	Nominated	
2022	18th British Academy Games Awards	British Game	Won	
2022	18th British Academy Games Awards	Family Game	Nominated	
2022	18th British Academy Games Awards	Game Design	Nominated	
2022	18th British Academy Games Awards	Multiplayer Game	Nominated	
2022	18th British Academy Games Awards	Technical Achievement	Nominated	
2022	SXSW Gaming Awards	Excellence in Animation, Art, & Visual Achievement	Won	
2022	SXSW Gaming Awards	Excellence in Audio Design	Nominated	
2022	SXSW Gaming Awards	Excellence in Technical Achievement	Nominated	
2022	Steam Awards	Game of the Year	Nominated	
2022	Steam Awards	Outstanding Visual Style	Won	
2022	NAVGTR Awards	Outstanding Game, Franchise Racing	Won	
2022	Game Audio Network Guild Awards	Best Game Audio Article or Publication (Note: The A Sound Effect article "Making the Award-Winning Sound of Forza Horizon 5 – A Glorious Game Audio Deep-Dive with Fraser Strachan" by Jennifer Walden was nominated.)	Nominated	
2023	British Academy Games Awards	Evolving Game	Nominated	
