= Forza Horizon =

2012 video game

- Original cover art featuring the SRT Viper GTS
- Developer: Playground Games (Note: Additional work provided by Turn 10 Studios)
- Publisher: Microsoft Studios
- Director: Gavin Raeburn
- Producers: Adam Askew; James Dobrowski
- Designers: Ralph Fulton; Martin Connor
- Programmer: Alan Roberts
- Artist: Benjamin Penrose
- Writer: Christian Cantamessa
- Series: Forza
- Platform: Xbox 360
- Release: NA/AU: 23 October 2012; EU: 26 October 2012
- Genre: Racing
- Modes: Single-player, multiplayer

Forza Horizon is a 2012 racing video game developed by Playground Games and published by Microsoft Studios for the Xbox 360 on 23 October 2012. The game is the fifth instalment of the Forza series, having originally spun-off from Turn 10 Studios-developed Forza Motorsport titles. Taking place during the fictitious Horizon Festival, a street racing event, the player's aim is to progress via winning races, while also increasing their popularity level by performing stunts and activities. Unlike previous games in the Forza series, Forza Horizon takes place in an open world that players can explore.

Upon its release, Forza Horizon received critical acclaim. It has since spawned its own series, with five additional sequels to date: Forza Horizon 2 (2014), 3 (2016), 4 (2018), 5 (2021), and 6 (2026). The Forza Horizon series would ultimately usurp the original Forza Motorsport series in July 2025, when almost half of Turn 10's workforce at the time was laid off and the American studio began to be reorganised into a support studio for the Forza Horizon series and the ForzaTech engine.

The game was delisted from the Xbox 360 Marketplace on October 20, 2016, following the expiration of its car branding licenses. On 23 June 2023, it was announced that the online servers for Forza Horizon along with Forza Horizon 2 would be shut down on 22 August 2023. Later, a workaround was discovered using Xbox Live’s peer to peer service which let friends explore the map online.

== Gameplay ==
Forza Horizon features an updated version of the Forza Motorsport 4 engine. Here a Ferrari F40 races a biplane in a point-to-point race.

Forza Horizon focuses specifically on casual street racing, rather than professionally on race tracks, as it takes place on a map of temporarily closed public roads. The open-world map that players can explore is based on the U.S. state of Colorado. It features multiple types of races, such as circuit races, off-road rally, and traditional point-to-point races. The roads feature both AI traffic and, when playing online, other player-controlled drivers. Players may challenge the other racers they encounter to a one-on-one race to a given location. The races start at the current location, and finish at a randomly generated way-point, usually more than 500 metres away from the player and their opponent. A skill system is implemented in the game; players earn popularity during races by driving aggressively. Acts such as drifting, jumping over obstacles and getting a car on two wheels all contribute to the player's popularity level. These can be chained together in a combo, which in turn affects the money players are paid at the end of a given race. As a player's popularity level increases new special events called showcases are unlocked, such as races against helicopters and planes.

In an interview with Turn 10's creative director Dan Greenawalt, he stated the game was developed in close relation to real music festivals—namely Coachella—and that he envisioned a more relaxed game-play experience than other games in the Forza series, while keeping a more realistic handling style. Being the main theme of the game, a large focus of the game is on the festival itself and activities surrounding it, rather than just racing.

Speed traps are present in the game, and players can challenge each other for the top speed in a given area. Cameras record player times, which can then be shared among rivals. Those rivals can then attempt to beat the shared time. A photography mode is also included. In addition to races, the map is scattered with barn find cars, rare classical vehicles that can be restored and added to the players garage for later use.

Other aspects of game-play include an auto-show, in which the player can buy or sell cars; a garage, in which the player can manually or automatically upgrade their cars, and a paint shop, in which players can create custom paints, liveries, and paint presets for their vehicles. When free-roaming, the player may encounter discount signs which, when smashed, give a price reduction on all upgrades from that point forwards.

== Development ==
Forza Horizon was developed by British developer Playground Games, which is composed of employees who formerly worked at various studios renowned for earlier racing titles and series such as Project Gotham Racing, Driver, Colin McRae: Dirt, Colin McRae Rally, Race Driver: Grid and Burnout. Playground Games originally pitched a reboot of the "long-dormant, much-loved" Project Gotham Racing before it was reworked into Forza Horizon. When asked about Playground Games' involvement, Dan Greenawalt said, "I wouldn't trust this partner as much as I do if I didn't expect them to surprise me and surprise our players. I have respect for their ability to come up with great ideas. So I think yes, they are challenged by the customers the same way we are to surprise them with innovation. That's how they see themselves, that's how we see them, it's how they see us. It's really a shared goal."

Of course it's a risk, [...] but some of the best racing games in the last twenty years have come out of the UK racing game development studios.

— Dan Greenawalt, head of Turn 10 Studios on collaborating with the UK-based Playground Games.

Though Forza Horizon is in the hands of an outside developer, Dan Greenawalt believed such risks are needed to meet the vision for the franchise.

Development of the environment began with research on almost 30 real-world locations. After initial research, creative director Ralph Fulton stated that there was "one clear winner", Colorado, USA. Trips were made to the state to take footage and over 50,000 still photos for reference. The goal, stated Fulton, was to "build our own take on Colorado". Initial world design began with a 2D layout which then evolved into multiple areas created with 3D models. The game features several types of landscape including snow-covered mountain roads, plains, foothills, and an area inspired by Colorado's Red Rocks Park; all are featured in a fictitious form alongside the game's Horizon festival location. The developers stated that finding ways to transition between these areas was one of the greatest challenges. Flora and fauna are also visible in the game for increased realism and depth.

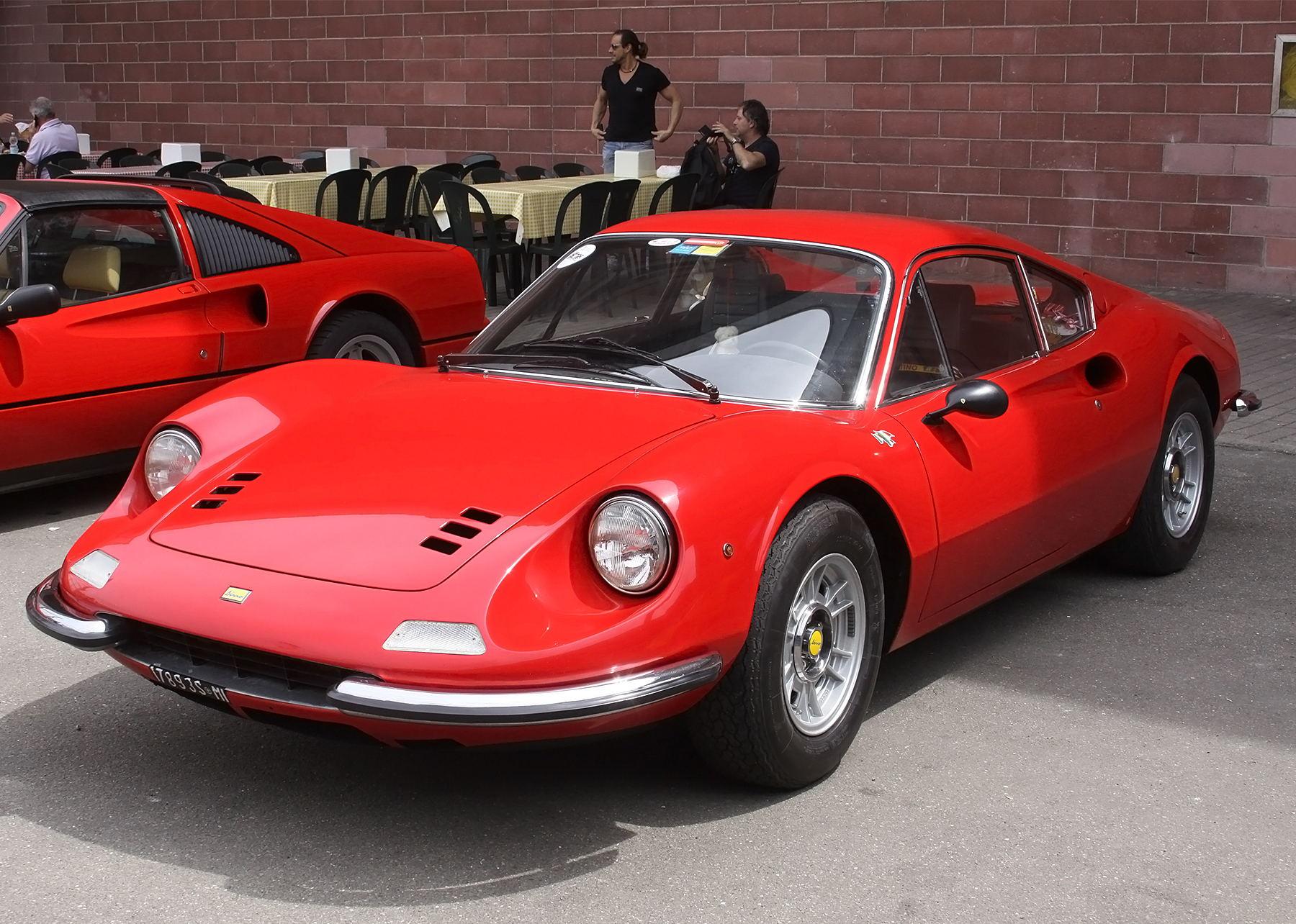
Extremely rare unicorn cars such as the Ferrari Dino 246 were added to increase the game's community presence; developer Playground Games awards these rare cars to players for community involvement.

A partial reveal of the vehicle list began on Forza's Twitter and Facebook pages on 23 August 2012. The list includes a 1969 Pontiac GTO Judge, a 2012 Hennessey Venom GT, and a Lamborghini Countach LP500 QV, among many others. A season pass was confirmed for future downloadable content (DLC) on 25 September 2012. It allows players to download the first six car packs, consisting of six cars each, gives players five exclusive cars, and will grant access to the game's rallying expansion pack slated for 18 December 2012 release. Vehicle selections vary between monthly instalments, and each vehicle can be purchased individually if players so choose. These vehicles include the Lamborghini Aventador J, Gumpert Apollo Enraged, Alfa Romeo 8C Spider, 2011 Ford F-150 SVT Raptor Halo Edition and the 1993 McLaren F1. Unicorn cars — cars that are rare and unobtainable through conventional means — can be given to players by the developer for community involvement in both in and out-of-game situations and events.

The 1000 Club was released on 16 April 2013, as a free DLC pack in the Xbox Marketplace. It was designed to extend the gameplay of Forza Horizon by adding new achievements and in-game medals. It includes two free cars, the Ruf CTR2 and the Ford F100. With the 1000 Club, each car in the game has about five or six in-game achievements that can be unlocked. By completing some of these achievements, players can unlock Xbox achievements. Forza Horizon was rated a 12 by PEGI and T by the ESRB; it is the only game in the Forza franchise to ever receive these ratings.

Community Manager of the series, Brian Ekberg, announced in September 2016 that the game has reached the "End of Life" status, meaning that the game and all its DLC has been removed from storefront effective 20 October 2016. However, on 30 April 2022, the game was unexpectedly relisted on the Xbox Games Store for a few hours before being delisted again, although the DLC was not relisted during this time. In March 2018, Microsoft released an update for the game under the Enhanced for Xbox One X program, allowing the game to run under 4K resolution on supported consoles. In June 2023, Turn 10 Studios announced that the online servers for Forza Horizon and Forza Horizon 2 would be closed on 22 August that year, citing low contemporary player counts, rendering online multiplayer unplayable and preventing user-generated content from being shared or downloaded although you can still play with friends with the Xbox Live peer to peer service.

== Soundtrack ==
The game's soundtrack contains several dubstep tracks, with a demonstration showing a variation of Avicii's "Levels" remixed by American music producer Skrillex. Three fictional radio stations are featured, all catering to different styles and genres of music. The radio stations are Horizon Bass Arena, focused on electronic music; Horizon Pulse, which plays indie music, and Horizon Rocks. Horizon Bass Arena and Horizon Pulse would continue to appear in the later sequels. As of the release of Forza Horizon 6, Scott Tyler, the DJ for Horizon Bass Arena, is the only character to appear in all games in the series.

Some featured songs are from highly popular producers, while some are from lesser-known artists, and multiple Australian artists, such as Cut Copy and Empire of the Sun. Playground Games also worked with Bestival founder and DJ Rob da Bank. He curated the featured songs and design of the festival, giving a more authentic experience. In an interview with DJMag, he said, "I was brought on board right at the start as a sort of creative consultant. Not just overseeing the music soundtrack, but also the design of the festival within the game, how the radio stations work in the car, and loads of other bits — including how you never put toilets near the food areas.[...]"

== Reception ==
Reception

Aggregate score
| Aggregator | Score |
|---|---|
| Metacritic | 85/100 |

Review scores
| Publication | Score |
|---|---|
| Destructoid | 9/10 |
| Edge | 8/10 |
| Electronic Gaming Monthly | 8.5/10 |
| Eurogamer | 9/10 |
| Game Informer | 8.5/10 |
| GameRevolution | 4/5 |
| GameSpot | 8.5/10 |
| GameTrailers | 9/10 |
| GameZone | 9.5/10 |
| Giant Bomb | 5/5 |
| IGN | 9/10 |
| Joystiq | 4/5 |
| Official Xbox Magazine (US) | 9/10 |
| Polygon | 6/10 |
| The Daily Telegraph | 4/5 |
| Digital Spy | 4/5 |

Forza Horizon received "favorable" reviews according to the review aggregation website Metacritic. Scores range from two perfect scores given by Jeff Gerstmann of Giant Bomb and David Wahlström of Eurogamer Sweden to a 60% approval from Philip Kollar of Polygon. The majority of scores were of an 80% approval rating or higher. It ranked in the top 20 Xbox LIVE titles for the first two months following its release. During the 16th Annual D.I.C.E. Awards, the Academy of Interactive Arts & Sciences nominated Forza Horizon for "Racing Game of the Year".

Eurogamer deputy editor Oli Welsh called Horizon "a big, exciting game that finally brings car enthusiasts together with the realistic open roads they crave." Welsh noted that the control scheme and realistic handling allows players to enjoy driving even the slowest of cars. GamesRadar's Sterling McGarvey felt that sometimes the cars lacked precise handling, but gave high marks for the game's environment and vast amount of activities to do. Matthew Kato of Game Informer praised the game's visuals, particularly noting the dynamic day/night cycle and the detailed environment and vehicles. He also praised the online multiplayer, including the game's Cat and Mouse multiplayer chase mode. Kato did note that much of the open world is blocked by guardrails, thus blocking a player's ability to chart their own paths during events such as a race against a plane.

In a more critical review Polygon's Philip Kollar noted that he felt the open-world environment felt empty. He further criticized the game's aggressive and expensive DLC plan. He stated that while the content is not forced on the player "it feels like the game is desperate to squeeze your wallet empty." Kollar said that Forza Horizon "is at its best when it drops the sim pretence and embraces its arcade nature".

The game also received high praise from non-video game publications. The Digital Fix gave it nine out of ten, saying that it "marks a new direction for the series and one that deserves your attention. Not only does it provide top notch visuals, a fantastic summer soundtrack and a wealth of racing options, it makes a traditionally sterile racing simulator just down right [sic] fun." The Daily Telegraph gave it a score of four stars out of five, calling it "a thrilling, charismatic, feel-good racer. They are the definitions that matter." The Globe and Mail also gave it a score of eight out of ten, calling it "a refreshing take on the racing genre that successfully straddles the line between serious car porn simulation and arcade-like bang 'em up games (including its voracious hunger for your "quarters")." Digital Spy similarly gave it four stars out of five, saying, "It will be interesting to see how Forza Horizon fares against Need for Speed: Most Wanted, Criterion's new open world racer that is out next month. But in the absence of that review, it is clear that Playground Games has seriously raised the bar in all areas for the non-linear racing genre with Forza Horizon, and others will now have to play catchup." The Guardian likewise gave it four stars out of five, praising its "RPG-like popularity engine" that encourages players to perform stunts and make riskier decisions rather than to simply follow racing lines.

In Japan, Famitsu gave it a total score of 36 out of 40. One reviewer said, "The way you participate in events and run races on public roads serves well as a new direction for the series. Earning popularity for things like drifting and other stuff makes it fun to just drive around, but I still wish there was something more unique to this game. I have to give top marks to the graphics and ease of play, though." Another reviewer stated, "This used to be a really stoic racing simulator, but this is more of a driving game designed to be easy to pick up. I feel like the controls are more forgiving, too, and the open-world freedom makes the whole thing a lot more approachable."
