= Mercedes-AMG One =

Plug-in hybrid sports car

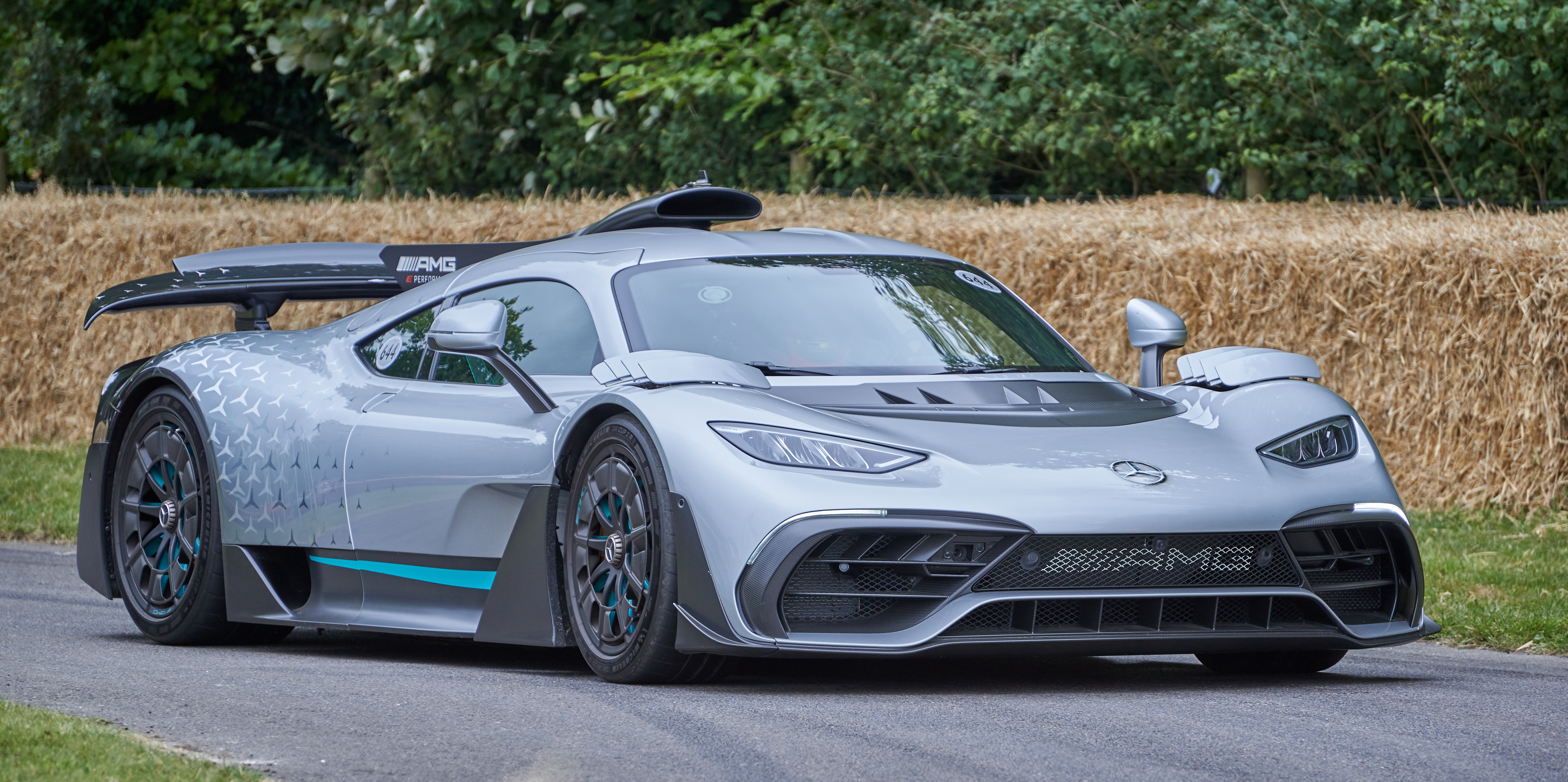
- A Mercedes-AMG One at the 2022 Goodwood Festival of Speed in Race Plus mode

Overview
- Manufacturer: Mercedes-AMG
- Production: August 2022 – 2025 (275 units planned)
- Assembly: United Kingdom: Brixworth (Mercedes AMG High Performance Powertrains) (engine); United Kingdom: Coventry (Multimatic) (final assembly)
- Designer: Gorden Wagener (Head of Design); Hartmut Sinkwitz (Interior-Design)

Body and chassis
- Class: Sports car (S)
- Body style: 2-door coupé
- Layout: Mid-engine, all-wheel-drive
- Doors: Butterfly
- Related: Mercedes F1 W06 Hybrid

Powertrain
- Engine: 1.6 L (98 cu in) Mercedes-Benz PU106B Hybrid E-turbo V6
- Electric motor: 1 MGU-H turbocharger; 1 MGU-K E-motor; 2 front-axle E-motors
- Power output: 422 kW (574 PS; 566 hp) (engine); 90 kW (122 PS; 121 hp) (MGU-H turbocharger); 120 kW (163 PS; 161 hp) (MGU-K electric motor); 240 kW (326 PS; 322 hp) (front axle electric motors); 782 kW (1,063 PS; 1,049 hp) (combined output)
- Transmission: 7-speed single-clutch automated manual
- Hybrid drivetrain: e-Performance PHEV
- Battery: 800 V lithium-ion battery
- Electric range: 18.1 km (11 mi)

Dimensions
- Wheelbase: 2,720 mm (107.1 in)
- Length: 4,756 mm (187.2 in)
- Width: 2,010 mm (79.1 in)
- Height: 1,261 mm (49.6 in)
- Kerb weight: 1,695–1,745 kg (3,737–3,847 lb)

Chronology
- Predecessor: Mercedes-Benz CLK LM Straßenversion

The Mercedes-AMG One (R50, previously known as Project One) is a limited-production plug-in dual hybrid sports car manufactured by Mercedes-AMG, featuring Formula One–derived technology. The Project One concept car was unveiled at the 2017 International Motor Show Germany by then three-time Formula One World Drivers' Champion and Mercedes driver Lewis Hamilton and head of Mercedes-Benz, Dieter Zetsche.

The production version of the AMG One was unveiled on 1 June 2022 and production began in August.

== Development ==
Mercedes-AMG unveiled the concept version of the One in 2017, the Project One with nearly identical specifications to the production version from 2022. Claimed that the production One will be evaluated on their performance, durability, and ability in Mercedes-Benz's proving grounds and on racing circuits. Development of the AMG One took place at Mercedes-AMG, in Affalterbach, Germany. Head of Mercedes-AMG, Tobias Moers described that when "the time is right", Lewis Hamilton, who has worked on the development of the car will join the team of development drivers testing prototypes of the car.

== Production ==
The production version of the AMG One unveiled on 1 June 2022. Production was expected to begin in late 2022 and planned to be limited for 275 units at a price of US$2.72 million per unit, all of which had been already sold. Mercedes-AMG received orders more than four times of the planned production number, but they refused to increase the production limit, in order to maintain exclusivity of the car. Production of the AMG One began in August 2022, all 275 cars were set to be hand built by Mercedes-AMG, with deliveries to begin in late 2022. The first car was delivered on 16 January 2023, which had an exclusive paint job inspired by the livery of the F1 W12 E Performance.

== Design ==
=== Exterior features ===
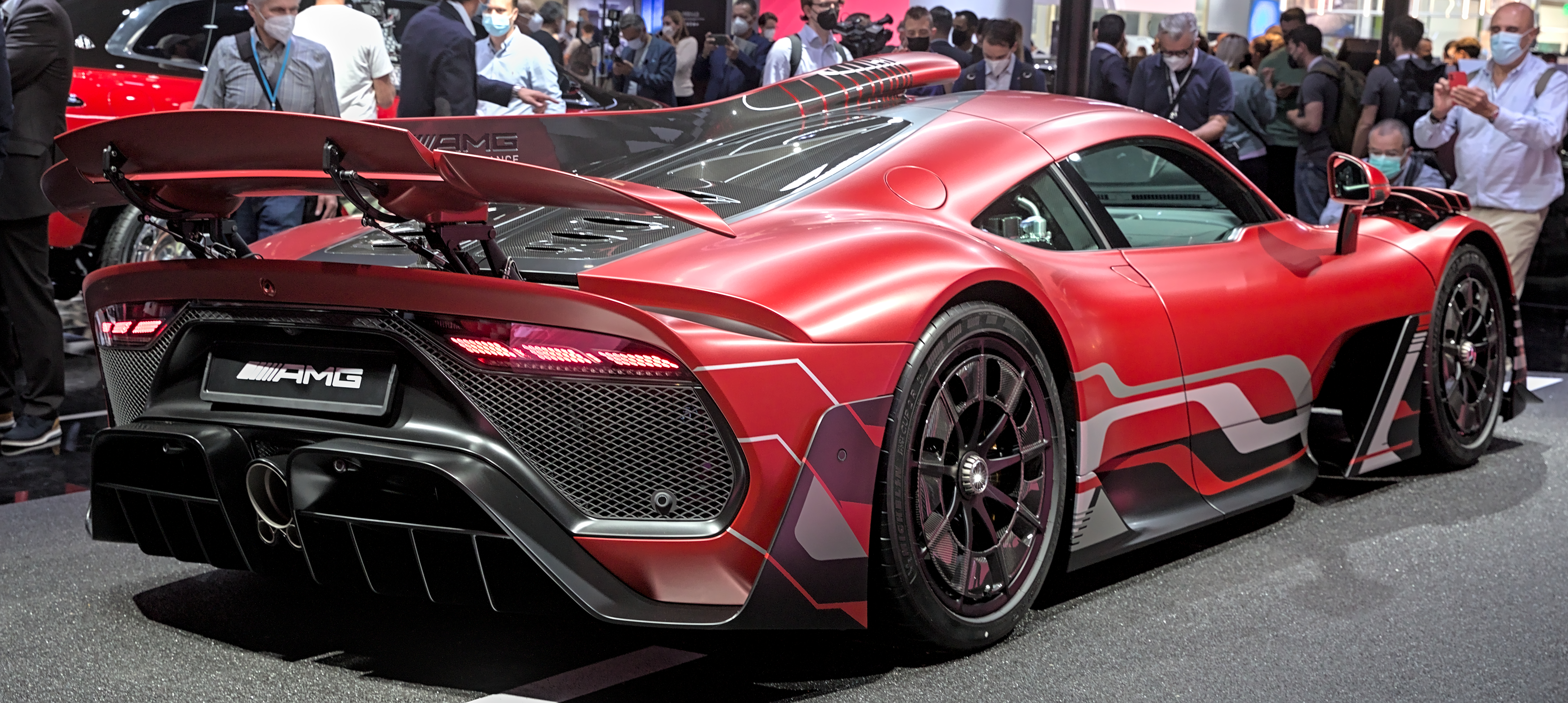
Rear view

The exterior of the car is designed primarily for better aerodynamics. Notable aerodynamic features include; moveable slats which were specifically developed for the front wheelhouses, two-part extendable rear wing with DRS system and active flaps on the front diffuser which were adjustable to suit the driver chosen driving program. Additionally, large front air inlets, roof-mounted air intake, large aerodynamic fin extending down the back half of the car and aerodynamically optimized wheels to aid generate more downforce in order to carry the maximum speed at highspeed corners.

=== Powertrain ===
The powertrain of the Mercedes-AMG One is rated at 782 kW (1,063 PS; 1,049 hp) through a hybrid drivetrain that shares many features with modern F1 cars. The car has an internal combustion engine and four electric motors.

==== Internal combustion engine ====
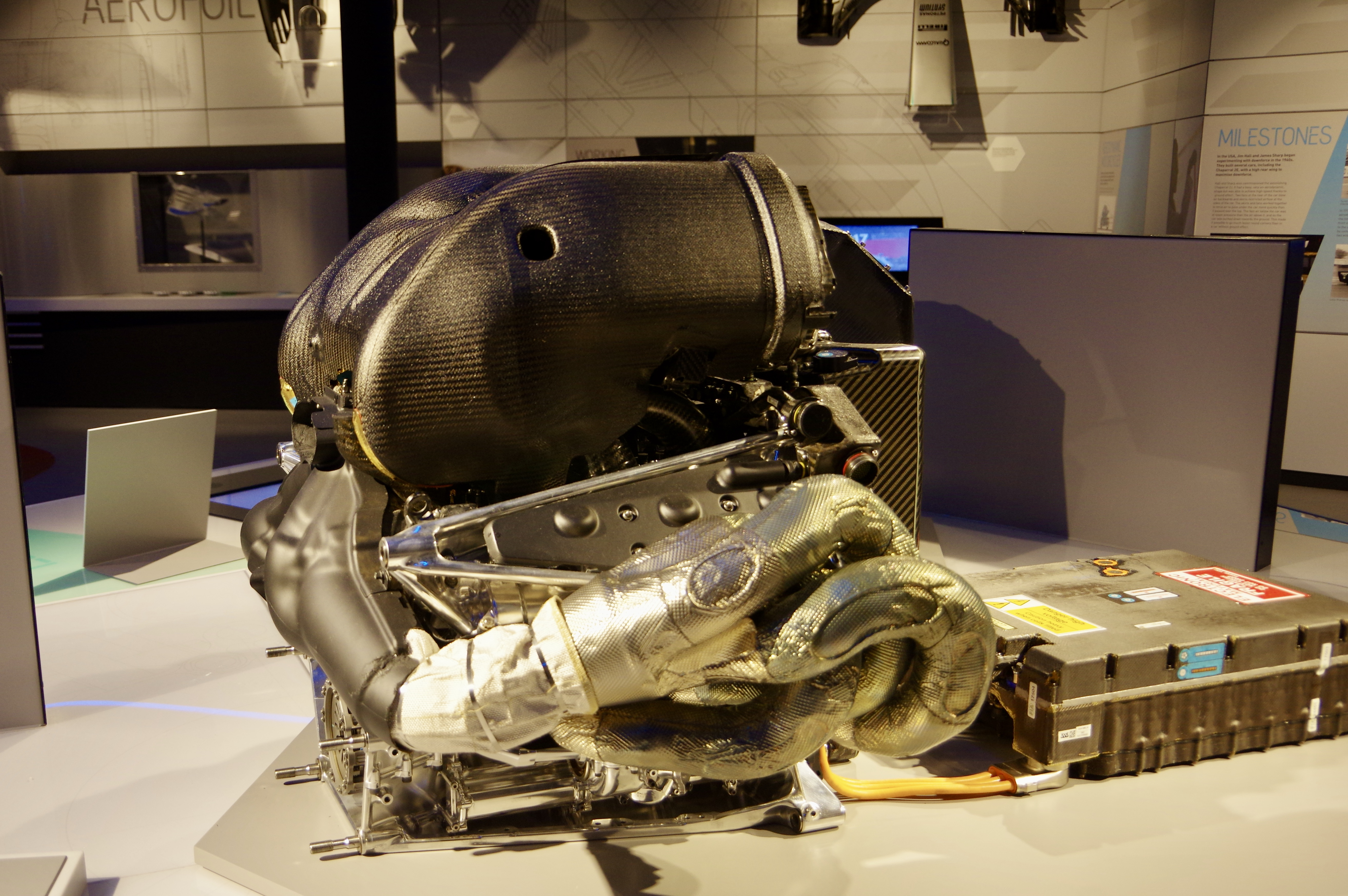
2016 Mercedes PU106 Hybrid Power Unit including battery

The car on which the engine and design of the One is based on is the Mercedes-AMG F1 W06, as confirmed by Mercedes-AMG board member Ola Källenius. The Mercedes-AMG One utilises a modified version of the Mercedes-Benz PU106B Hybrid engine, a 1.6-litre turbocharged 90-degree V6 engine. Modifications were done to the engine as to make comply with the idle RPM and redline regulations. Tobias Moers, claimed that the engine would be at 1,280 rpm at idle, and 11,000 rpm at its redline limit. However, the engine would only last for 50,000 km (31,000 mi) and the owners will have to return their cars for an engine refurbishment. The ICE produces 422 kW (574 PS; 566 hp), torque figures were claimed to be unmeasurable due to the complex drivetrain. Top speed of this car is limited at 219 mph (352 km/h).

==== Electric motors ====
The internal combustion engine works in conjunction with four electric motors: a 120 kW (163 PS; 161 hp) motor generator unit-kinetic (MGU-K) coupled to the crankshaft, a 90 kW (122 PS; 121 hp) motor generator unit-heat (MGU-H) coupled to the turbocharger, and two 120 kW (163 PS; 161 hp) electric motors at the front axle. The MGU-K and MGU-H are Formula One-style motors responsible for recovering energy and improving efficiency during the operation of the car. More specifically, the MGU-K serves to generate electricity during braking, while the MGU-H serves to eliminate turbo lag in order to improve throttle response by keeping the turbine spinning at lower engine speeds and also to recover waste energy from the exhaust. The final two electric motors driving the front wheels make up for an all-wheel drive drivetrain, the sum of these four electric motors contribute 360 kW (489 PS; 483 hp) of effective power to the total power output figure of the AMG One.

=== Transmission ===
The AMG One features a 7-speed single-clutch automated manual transmission with 4-disc carbon racing clutch (similar to the type of transmission used in modern F1 cars), and delivers the bulk of the engine power and torque to the rear wheels. The use of a single-clutch over a dual-clutch transmission was due to engineers wanting to keep the car light and concerns over the dual-clutch's ability to handle the high-revving ICE.

=== Suspension and wheels ===
The car contains a five-link aluminium coil-over suspension setup with two transverse adjustable push-rod spring struts, including adaptive damping adjustments. Rear axle links are shaped for better aerodynamics. It also features the hydraulic AMG carbon-fibre ceramic high-performance composite brake system, with 398 x 38 mm front composite brake discs, ventilated with 6-piston aluminium fixed callipers. 380 x 34 mm rear composite brake discs, ventilated with 4-piston aluminium fixed callipers. Additionally electric parking brake, ABS, brake assist and 3-stage ESP were also offered for the car.

The AMG One also has unique 10-spoke forged aluminium alloy wheels emerged with NACA carbon fibre openings for brake cooling and increase downforce. Also, with diameters of 19 inches at the front and 20 inches at the rear with F1-styled centre-lock wheel nuts. The tyres are semi-slick Michelin Pilot Sport Cup 2Rs with codes of 285/35 ZR 19 for the front and 335/30 ZR 20 for the rear. The brakes are ventilated carbon-ceramic discs.

=== Interior features ===
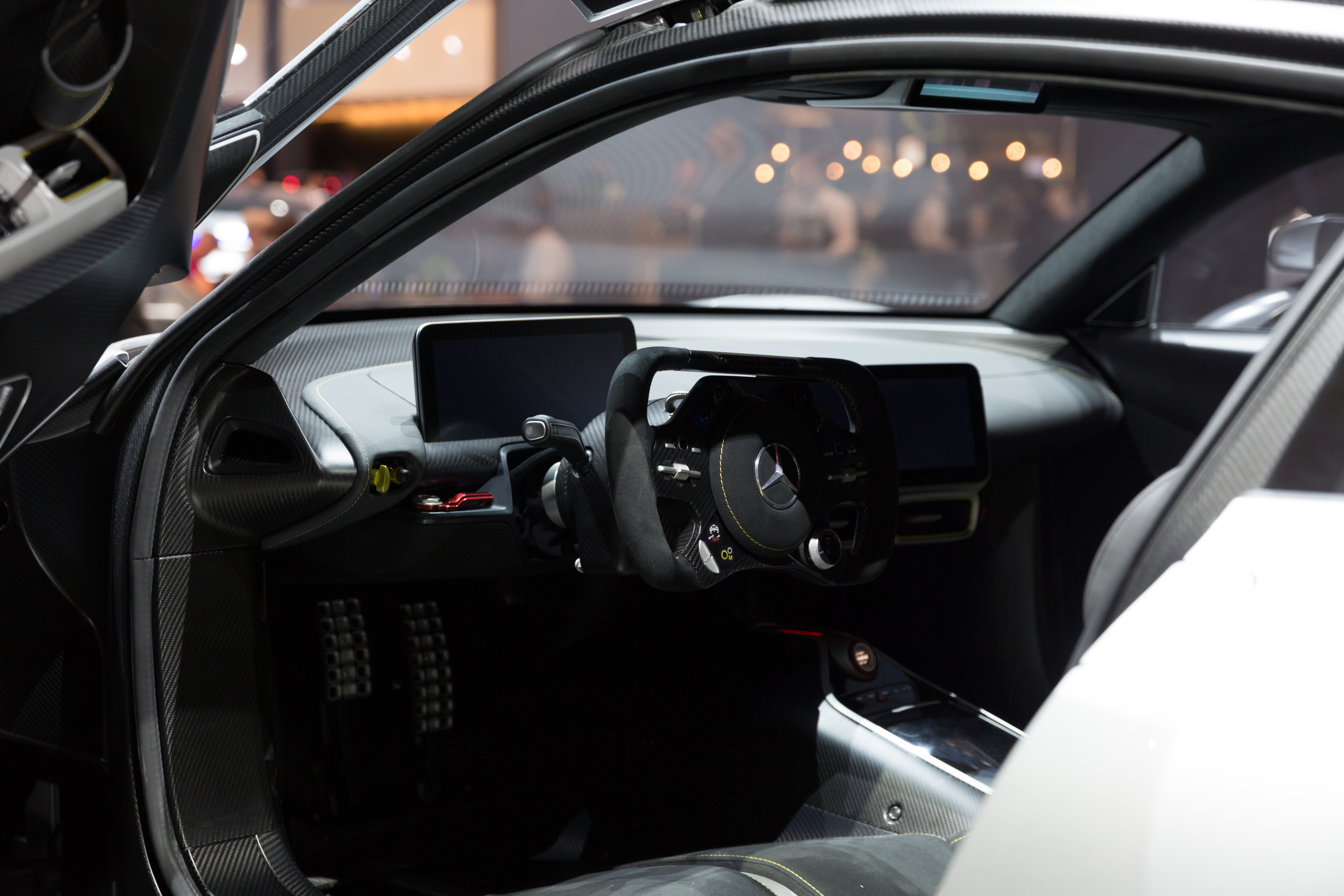
Interior

The interior is mostly minimalist and driver-focused, continuing the F1 theme of the AMG One. This includes AMG Motorsport bucket seats, integrated into the carbon monocoque, a F1-style steering wheel with knobs for driving programs including; DRS, overtake etc. Paddle shifters and a driver-oriented central infotainment screen were also featured in the car. There are some traditional luxury features in the interior, notably the napa leather and hand stitching on the bucket seats.

=== Chassis ===
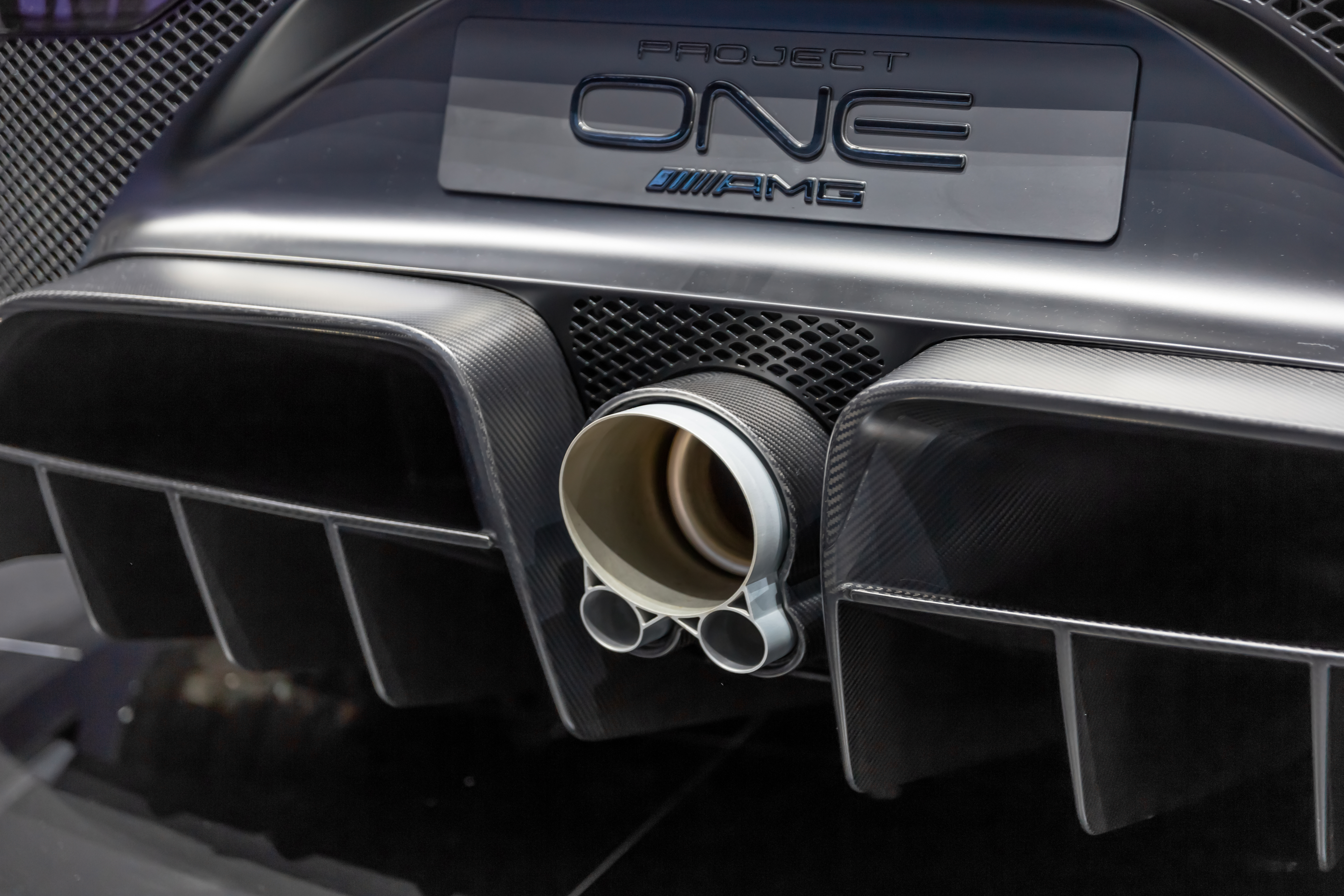
F1 inspired exhaust pipes

The body is made entirely out of carbon fiber in line with its F1 counterpart, resulting in a final kerb weight of 1,695 kg (3,737 lb). The car also features the F1 inspired exhaust tailpipe with a large round main outlet and two smaller outlets.

== Performance ==
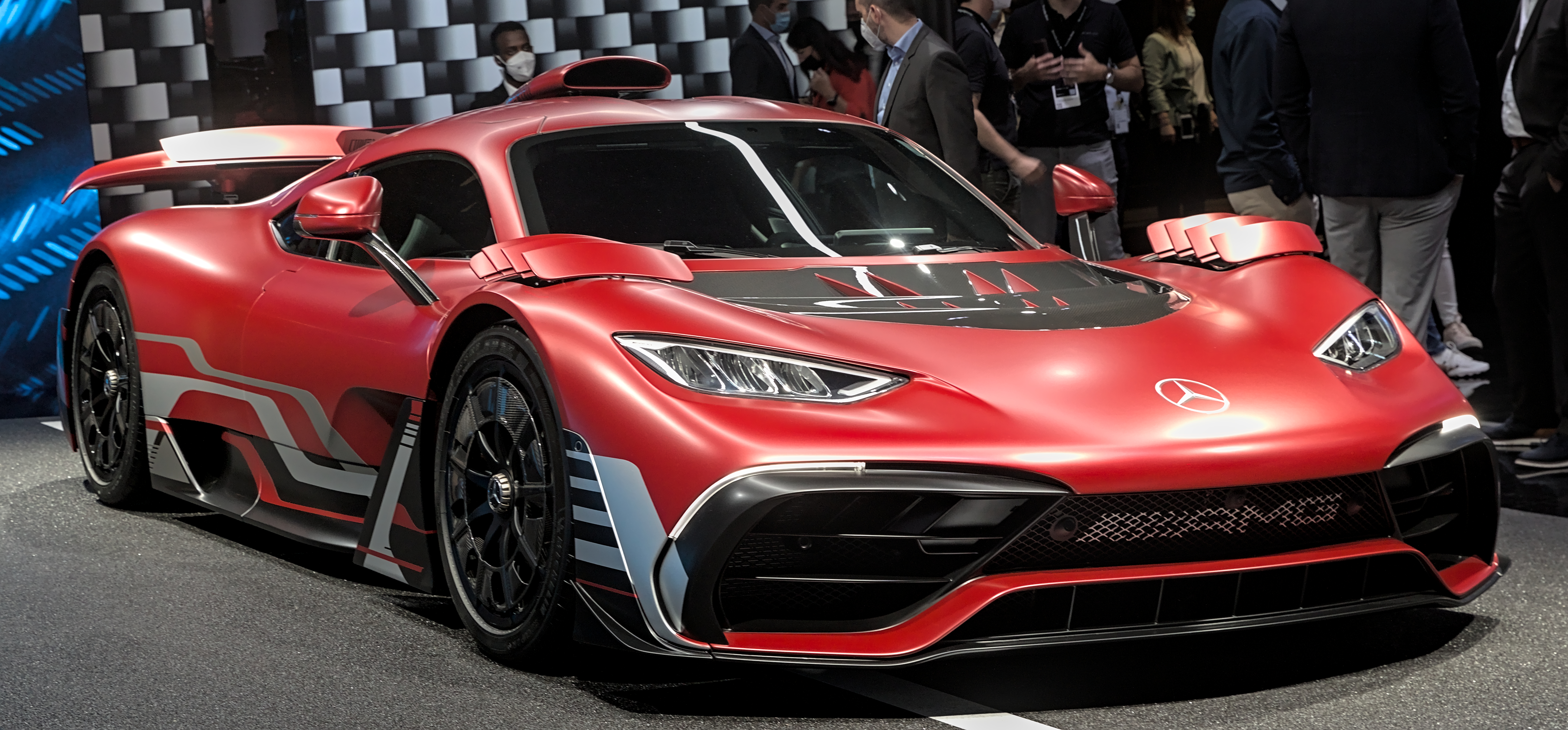
AMG ONE in Strat 2 mode

The One has six different drive modes, including:

- "Race safe" mode; which features a hybrid driving mode with an all-electric start up. The ICE is switched at higher speeds.
- "Race" mode is also a hybrid driving mode with a special energy recovery strategy. Also, with a continuous combustion engine run and battery charging.
- "EV" mode is an all-electric driving mode.
- "Race plus" mode features active aerodynamics; front diffuser flaps folds up to shape, rear wing is fully extended, louvres (front fender vents) open up, lower the car by 37 mm in front and 30 mm in rear, chassis tuning and special performance management.
- "Strat 2" mode, which features all "Race Plus" changes and additionally with firmer suspension tuning and full electric power from all electric motors. This is a similar driving mode as used in F1 cars during qualifying sessions. Furthermore, the driver can save their personal favourite settings under the "individual" mode.

In "Race plus" and "Strat 2" modes, the total vehicle downforce is increased by up to five times when compared to other drive modes. The AMG One also features F1's Drag Reduction System (DRS). Reducing the vehicle's overall downforce by 20 percent from lowering the rear wing flaps and closing the front louvers to increase straight line speed. DRS can be turned off by manually and automatically from applying brakes.

Official performance and standstill acceleration times claimed by Mercedes-AMG:

- Top speed: 352 km/h (219 mph)
- 0-100 km/h (62 mph): 2.9 seconds
- 0-200 km/h (124 mph): 7.0 seconds
- 0-300 km/h (186 mph): 15.6 seconds

=== Lap records ===
In November 2022, the AMG One set a lap time of 6:35.183 minutes around the Nürburgring Nordschleife 12.944 mile (20.832 km) course. Driven by Maro Engel, it became the fastest road-legal production car around the track, beating the previous record by over 13 seconds, held by the Mercedes-AMG GT Black Series. Engel revealed the track was not in ideal conditions, as some parts of the track were still on damp conditions and he had to lift throttle at those particular corners. Mercedes-AMG claimed the car could have easily done a sub 6:30 minute lap time, if the track was in ideal conditions.

Mercedes-AMG later tested this claim and, in September 2024, set another laptime in optimal track conditions with a time of 6:29.09 minutes, beating its own record by another 6 seconds. This makes the AMG One the first road-legal production car to set a sub-6:30 minute lap time around the Nürburgring Nordschleife 12.944 mile (20.832 km) course.

Following the 2022 Nürburgring lap record, Mercedes-AMG revealed that the AMG One has set new lap records around the Nürburgring Grand Prix circuit, Hockenheimring, and Red Bull Ring, setting lap times of 1:56.096 minutes, 1:38.563 minutes and 1:26.846 minutes respectively. In April 2023, the AMG One was claimed to have set another production car lap record with a time of 1:43.902 minutes around the Monza Circuit.

== Marketing ==
The AMG One acts as one of the "hero cars" of Forza Horizon 5, being featured on the game's cover alongside the Ford Bronco.

== See also ==
- List of production cars by power output
