= Forza Horizon 2 =

2014 video game

- Standard cover art featuring the Lamborghini Huracán
- Developer: Playground Games (Note: Additional work by Turn 10 Studios, ported to Xbox 360 by Sumo Digital)
- Publisher: Microsoft Studios
- Director: Ralph Fulton
- Producer: Adam Askew
- Designers: Martin Connor; Lee Niven
- Programmer: Alan Roberts
- Artist: Benjamin Penrose
- Series: Forza
- Platforms: Xbox One; Xbox 360
- Release: NA: 30 September 2014; AU: 2 October 2014; EU: 3 October 2014
- Genre: Racing
- Modes: Single-player, multiplayer

Forza Horizon 2 is a 2014 racing video game developed for Microsoft's Xbox One and Xbox 360 consoles. It is the sequel to 2012's Forza Horizon, the seventh instalment in the Forza series, and the series' first multi-console instalment. The Xbox One version of the game was developed by Playground Games, the team behind the original Forza Horizon, while Sumo Digital developed the version for Xbox 360, with Forza series developer Turn 10 Studios supporting both builds. The Xbox 360 version is also the final Forza game released for the platform. The game received positive reviews from critics and a sequel, Forza Horizon 3, was released on 27 September 2016.

The game was delisted from sale on 1 October 2018, following the expiration of its car branding licenses. The game's online servers, along with those for Forza Horizon, were shut down on 22 August 2023.

== Gameplay ==
In-game screenshot showing the player driving a Lamborghini Veneno to a destination

Forza Horizon 2 is a racing video game, featuring an open world environment. The player participates in the Horizon Festival, a fictional racing competition set within Southern France and Northern Italy. The game has approximately three times more drivable area than that of its predecessor Forza Horizon, with events set in Provence, Liguria and Côte d'Azur (Nice) along with scaled down towns of Sisteron and Saint-Martin-du-Var. There is a small part of the map that includes parts of the Amalfi Coast and a fictional town called Castelletto which consists of features from the town of Amalfi. There is also some small features in the map like the golf course, the docks (which are only accessible in the Xbox One version of the game except if the Fast & Furious expansion is owned for the Xbox 360 version) and aerodrome. Players can explore the expansive map, taking part in races and special events in order to advance through the game. Events can take place at day or night, and a dynamic weather system was added for the first time in a Forza-series game.

Among new features in the game are "Bucket Lists", three groups of timed challenges for the player to complete, similar to the 1000 Club in Forza Horizon. They can be completed in solo or co-op mode (when a player goes to the online version of the map, they can be completed with a random person or invited friend). These challenges are continuously updated to provide new challenges throughout the map. Car Meets are an online mode where players can meet up online and compare their cars, similar to "Forzavista" mode in Forza Motorsport 5. Players are also able to interact with each other in Car Meets, including sharing tuning setups and liveries. In the online version of the game, races such as circuits, sprints, and cross country are playable against other players, along with other game types such as Infected and King.

The standalone expansion of the game based on The Fast and the Furious franchise, Forza Horizon 2 Presents Fast & Furious, added nitrous oxide boosts to the Forza series. Unlike other racing games however, nitrous can only be used during most of the game's events, and only replenishes at the very start of said events. On the Xbox 360, it's only used in drag races.

== Development ==
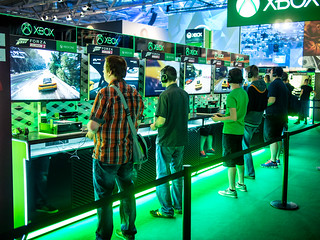
Promotion at Gamescom 2014

Forza Horizon 2 is the second game in the series to be developed principally by a studio other than Forza Motorsport developer Turn 10 Studios. Playground Games, the lead developer for Forza Horizon, focused on the Xbox One version, using the graphics engine from Forza Motorsport 5 as their starting point. While the engine is capable of displaying content 1080p and 60 frames-per-second, the game was locked at 1080p and 30 frames-per-second, which was deemed necessary because of the game's open-world nature. According to creative director Ralph Fulton, "one of the big technical challenges that we had to face was making sure that we could stream in a world that is next-gen beautiful, but fast enough to keep up with the fastest car."

A Car racing against a Helicopter in a showcase event exclusive to the Xbox 360 version of the game.

Sumo Digital took the lead for the Xbox 360 version, starting from the original Forza Horizon graphics engine. As with the original game, Turn 10 Studios provided support to the primary developers. The Xbox 360 version does not include the weather system such as rain or "drivatar" A.I. found in the more-powerful Xbox One version, and also omits tuning and the free-roam open-world (as very few barriers can be broken through and crossed), with Playground Games calling the two versions "different games".

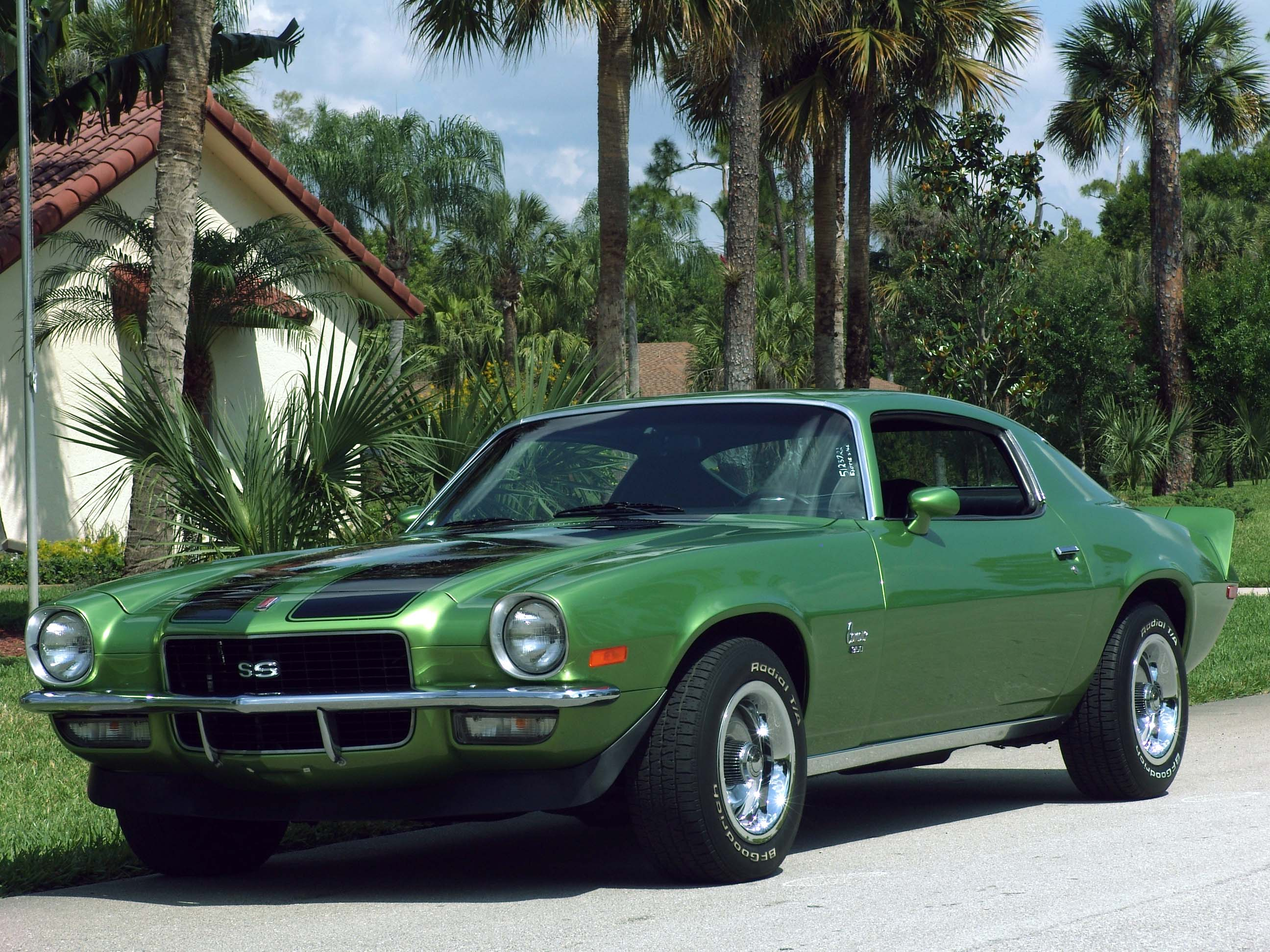
Many cars carry over from the original Forza Horizon, while many new cars, such as the 1970 Chevrolet Camaro, have been added to the game.

On 22 July 2014, Turn 10 Studios revealed the first 100 of over 200 cars to be featured in the open world game, from exotics, rally cars, trucks, hot hatches, among others. Many cars from the Forza series return, including many cars from the original Horizon game. The list includes the 2014 Lamborghini Huracán LP610-4 and Veneno, the McLaren P1, the LaFerrari, the Agera, and the Bugatti Veyron Super Sport. Another new car that they had released was the Ford Capri RS3100 which is a barn find. All ten barn finds can be found off-road, usually in hidden places.

When choosing the locale for Forza Horizon 2, the developers investigated over 30 locations around the world, including California and Australia, ultimately choosing Southern Europe. Creative director Ralph Fulton cited Europe's "fantastic driving roads, amazing environmental diversity, and just stunning vistas that you really want to explore" as some of the major points in selecting it for Horizon 2. Fulton also noted that most of the recent open-world driving games were set in North America and that Southern Europe "just felt fresh, it felt different, it felt new, and it was a gimme for us".

The Playground Games audio team recorded exhaust, intake, supercharger, and turbocharger sounds on real cars, and each sound is independent and modelled separately. To create loops through the rev range, they paired the sounds to each rotation of the engine. The mix of intake or exhaust notes depends on the camera position inside or outside the car. The team used the increased power of the Xbox One to play back assets of higher quality and loop length. They recorded environmental sounds like raindrops hitting the car, skidding on wet and dry surfaces, and debris kick-up.

== Release ==
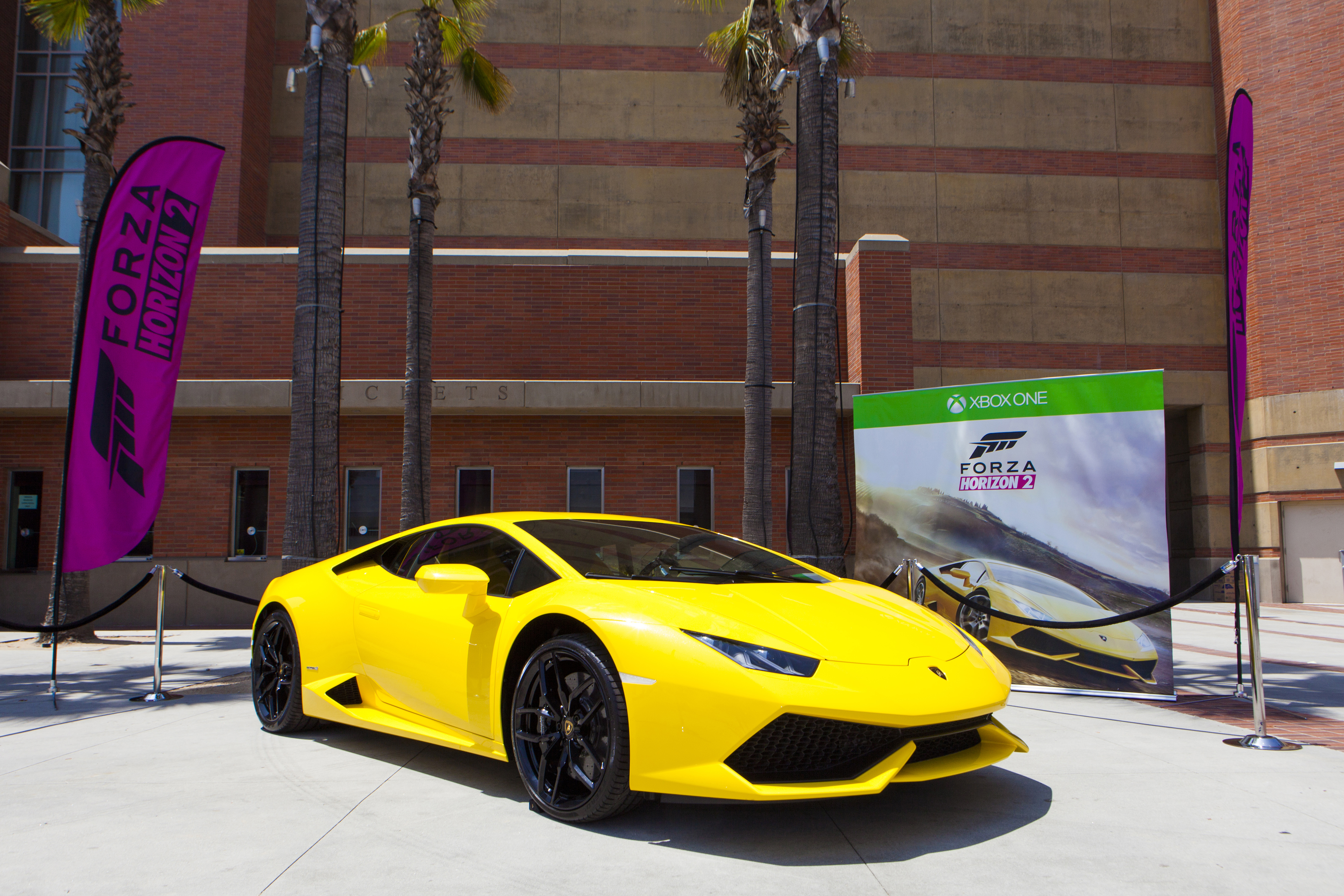
The Lamborghini Huracán, featured as the cover car for Forza Horizon 2, on display at the Galen Center during the 2014 Electronic Entertainment Expo in Los Angeles, California.

On 27 August 2014, Microsoft announced that a demo version of the game would be made available on Xbox One on 16 September 2014. On the day of the demo release, Microsoft confirmed that the game had been declared gold, indicating it was being prepared for duplication and release. The standard "10th Anniversary Edition" of the Xbox One version (consisting of the base game and the 10th Anniversary Car Pack) was given to Xbox Live Gold members for free throughout August 2018 as part of Microsoft's Games with Gold program. Forza Horizon 2 and its downloadable content were delisted on 1 October 2018. Those who already own it can still download and play the game and its DLC. On 23 June 2023, it was announced by Turn 10 Studios that they would be shutting down the online servers for Forza Horizon and all versions of Forza Horizon 2 (including the Fast & Furious standalone expansion) on 22 August 2023, thereby removing access to game features including leaderboards, matchmaking, and access to user-generated content, with support for offline play still being available past that date.

=== Expansions ===
On 16 December 2014, Microsoft launched Storm Island, an expansion pack for the Xbox One edition of the game. Storm Island adds, along with the new setting and associated tracks, five new event types, an expansion of the game engine's weather system, five new vehicles and an additional barn-find car. On 25 February 2015, Microsoft announced Forza Horizon 2 Presents Fast & Furious, a standalone expansion to promote the release of Furious 7. It was released on 27 March 2015 for free until 10 April 2015. The expansion added music from Furious 7, composed by Brian Tyler, exclusively for the Showcase events. Actor Chris "Ludacris" Bridges who played Tej in the Fast & Furious series was also featured in the game with his voiceover. In June 2015, Microsoft announced a new Porsche expansion pack for the game that was released on 9 June 2015. The expansion, which was authorized by Electronic Arts, the then-license-holder for Porsche vehicles in video games, adds ten vehicles, such as the 944, 911 GT3 RS, the Macan Turbo and the Cayman GTS. The expansion also adds new Bucket List items, new Rivals events and 15 new achievements based around the Porsche models. All the DLCs contents are only exclusive to the Xbox One edition of the game.

== Reception ==
Reception

Aggregate scores
Aggregator	Score
GameRankings	86.25%
Metacritic	86/100

Review scores
Publication	Score
Computer and Video Games	9/10
Destructoid	9.5/10
Eurogamer	9/10
GamesRadar+	4/5
IGN	9/10
Joystiq	4/5
Official Xbox Magazine (US)	8/10
Polygon	7/10
Hardcore Gamer	4.5/5
Pure Xbox	9/10

The Xbox One version of Forza Horizon 2 received highly positive reviews. It received an aggregated score of 86.25% on GameRankings based on 53 reviews and 86/100 on Metacritic based on 82 reviews. Writing for IGN, Luke Reilly said that the game had "comprehensively updated" the standards for open-world racing games and that it was "Test Drive Unlimited, PGR, Smuggler’s Run, and Forza Motorsport all crammed into a T-shirt cannon and fired into your face". Conversely, Polygon's Arthur Gies, while giving the game a positive review, said that the track design in Forza Horizon 2 "can't compete" with the licensed tracks used in Forza Motorsport 5. Jonathan Leack of CraveOnline called the game "racing paradise" and "a highly enjoyable destination for anyone willing to buckle up behind a wheel". Leack also compared the two separate versions of the game and discovered a number of differences. As an example, when players are given the option to choose their first car at the start of the game, the Xbox 360 version uses a graphic interface, while the Xbox One version lets the players choose the cars in-world. Calling the Xbox One version a "system-seller" and "a good time to invest in next-gen", Leack said that Sumo Digital "has done a fantastic job" with the Xbox 360 version and that it was "one of the best-looking racing games on the platform".

During the 18th Annual D.I.C.E. Awards, the Academy of Interactive Arts & Sciences nominated Forza Horizon 2 for "Racing Game of the Year".
