= Fast travel =

Video game mechanic

Fast travel or teleportation is a video game mechanic used in open world games that allows a player character to instantaneously travel between previously discovered locations (teleport waypoints or fast-travel points) without having to traverse that distance in real time. It is a type of warp that is specifically used to traverse the game's world rather than the inside of a level. Sometimes in-game time passes while fast-traveling, while in other cases the travel is simply implied or the player is teleported by magical or technological means. While typically used as a means of providing convenience to the player, fast travel has been criticized as detracting from games' design, as some worlds or quests are designed to incorporate it at the expense of depth, memorability or realism.

== Characteristics ==
Fast travel is usually performed from an in-game menu upon accessing either a map of the overworld or an object such as a vehicle or save point. The player is immediately transported from one location to another, sometimes with an appropriate amount of in-game time passing in between, as though they had traveled straight to their destination.

Some games have restrictions on the amount of fast traveling that can be performed, generally by requiring the use of a purchasable item each time, like a tent or magical talisman. Others allow infinite fast travel with no penalty. For example, Genshin Impact allows unlimited fast travel to any unlocked Teleport Waypoint, Statue of the Seven, or Domain on the map, but requires a consumable "portable waypoint" to be deployed for seven days to fast travel to anywhere more specific.

Horses and cars are often used as partial substitutes for fast travel that allow faster, but not instantaneous movement through the world.

== Reception ==
GameCrate called fast travel a "tremendous convenience" that makes game "appealing to the masses" and helps players who are on a "tight schedule", but suggested that players not use it for a better experience. Brendan Caldwell of Rock, Paper, Shotgun went further in expressing his dislike of fast travel, stating that he enjoyed Skyrim much more after downloading a mod that allowed fast travel to be turned off. He stated that "fast travel removes all sense of real distance", citing Dark Souls, a game that was designed around walking, as evoking the concept and emotions of a journey much more, and stating that the removal of any boredom also eliminates the feeling of a "real quest". While making the counter-argument that players would become too bored if they were forced to manually travel everywhere, he stated that it would force game designers to make the world interesting to walk through.

Patricia Hernandez of Kotaku stated that playing Fallout 4 without using fast travel "completely transformed" her experience with the game. Similarly, Kirk Hamilton suggested fast traveling less in The Legend of Zelda: Breath of the Wild.

== See also ==
- Warp (gaming)
