= Kai Wulff =

German-born American actor and voice actor (born 1949)

- Born: December 18, 1949 (age 76); Germany
- Occupations: Actor; voice actor
- Years active: 1980–present
- Spouse: Carolyn Wulff

Kai Wulff (born December 18, 1949) is a German-born American actor and voice actor. He is perhaps best known for his role as Lt. Colonel Yuri Voskov in Firefox and 'The German' in Three Amigos. He appeared in the films Twilight Zone: The Movie (1983), Oscar (1991), Top Dog, and Assassins (both 1995).

During the 1980s and 1990s, he guest-starred in several television series, often as a villain, such as The A-Team, MacGyver, Knight Rider, Street Hawk, Walker, Texas Ranger, Hart to Hart and Days of Our Lives.

Since 1996 he works mainly as voice actor in video games, such as Captain America: Super Soldier (2011), in which he voices Baron Strucker. Occasionally he also provides voices for German dubbings of American films including Al Pacino in Scarface (1983) and Robin Williams in Man of the Year (2006).

He is married to Carolyn Wulff, they have one child.

== Filmography ==
=== Film ===
Year	Title	Role	Notes
1980	Heaven's Gate	German Merchant	
1981	Night of the Zombies	Unknown	
1982	Barbarosa	Otto	
1982	Firefox	Lieutenant Colonel Yuri Voskov	
1983	Twilight Zone: The Movie	SS Officer	(segment "Time Out")
1984	Jungle Warriors	Ben Sturges	
1986	Three Amigos	The German	
1991	Oscar	Underwood Chauffeur	
1995	Top Dog	Otto Dietrich	
1995	Assassins	Interpol Agent Remy	

=== Television ===
Year(s)	Title	Role	Notes
1980–1981	Flo	Unknown	2 episodes
1981–1982	The Greatest American Hero	Sergei Valenkov / Peter	2 episodes
1982	The Love Boat	Mikhail	Episode : "Doc Take the Fifth/Safety Last/A Business Affair"
1982	Hart to Hart	Christian Oberman	Episode : "My Hart Belongs to Daddy"
1982	World War III	Konstantin Sculoff	TV miniseries
1982	Bring 'Em Back Alive	Heinrich	Episode : "Bring 'Em Back Alive"
1983	Tales of the Gold Monkey	U-boat Captain	Episode : "Black Pearl"
1983	Casablanca	Lieutenant Heinz	5 episodes
1983–1985	Knight Rider	Helmut Gras (1x15), Vlud (3x12)	2 episodes
1983–1991	Days of Our Lives	Petrov	some episodes
1983–1986	Scarecrow and Mrs. King	Unknown	2 episodes
1984	The Jesse Owens Story	Luz Long	TV film
1984	Blue Thunder	Allen Swenson	Episode : "Revenge in the Sky"
1984–1986	The A-Team	Krueger	3 episodes
1985	Street Hawk	Bingham	Episode : "Dog Eat Dog"
1986–1991	MacGyver	Stepan Frolov (1x16)	4 episodes
1988	Out of This World	Chief	Episode : "The Russians Are Coming"
1988	Santa Barbara	Helmut Schilling	3 episodes
1988	Goodbye, Miss 4th of July	Peter Getner	TV film
1989	The Forgotten	Feldhaus	TV film
1991	Santa Barbara	Andre Wolfe	36 episodes
1992	Red Shoe Diaries	Paul	TV film
1993	Berlin Break	Willy Richter	US-German TV series
1996	The Great War and the Shaping of the 20th Century	Franz Blumenfeldt	3 episodes (voice)
1996	The Sentinel	Carl Reischer	Episode : "Flight"
1996–1999	Walker, Texas Ranger	Cosmo Von Deusenberg / Steven Michael "The Viper" Jamieson	2 episodes
1998	The X-Files	3rd Nazi	season 6 Episode : "Triangle"
2001	Power Rangers Time Force	Dr. Hammond	Episode : "The Quantum Quest"

=== Video games ===
Year(s)	Title	Role	Notes
1996	The Beast Within: A Gabriel Knight Mystery	Von Glower / Various (voices)	German, French dub only
1999	Medal of Honor	Additional Voices	
2002	Medal of Honor: Allied Assault	Additional Voices	
2002	Medal of Honor: Frontline	Additional Voices	
2002	007 Nightfire	Austrian Guards / Party Guests	
2003	Indiana Jones and the Emperor's Tomb	Richter / Soldier 3	
2003	Secret Weapons Over Normandy	Krieger	
2004	Call of Duty: Finest Hour	Additional Voices	
2005	Medal of Honor: European Assault	Additional Voices	
2005	Call of Duty 2	Additional Voices	
2006	Company of Heroes	Additional Voices	
2007	Medal of Honor: Vanguard	German Soldiers	
2007	Blazing Angels 2	General Heinrich Von Kluge	
2007	Medal of Honor: Airborne	Additional Voices	
2007	Company of Heroes: Opposing Fronts	Voss	
2008	Turning Point: Fall of Liberty	Additional Voices	
2008	007: Quantum of Solace	Gettler	
2009	Company of Heroes: Tales of Valor	Funke / Axis Intel / German POW	
2009	Call of Duty: Modern Warfare 2	Additional Voice	
2009	The Saboteur	Additional Voices	
2010	Call of Duty: Black Ops	Additional Voices	
2011	Captain America: Super Soldier	Baron Strucker, HYDRA	
2011	Red Orchestra 2	German Announcer	
2013	Tomb Raider	Solarii	
2015	Killing Floor 2	Anton Strasser	
2016	Call of Duty: Infinite Warfare	Additional Voices	
