= Medal of Honor: Heroes =

2006 video game

- North American cover art
- Developer: Team Fusion
- Publisher: EA Games
- Series: Medal of Honor
- Platform: PlayStation Portable
- Release: NA: October 23, 2006; AU: November 9, 2006; EU: November 24, 2006
- Genre: First-person shooter
- Modes: Single-player, multiplayer

Medal of Honor: Heroes is a first-person shooter video game developed by Canadian studio Team Fusion for the PlayStation Portable as the ninth installment in the Medal of Honor series. It was released on October 23, 2006, in North America.

A direct sequel, Medal of Honor: Heroes 2, was released the following year on the PSP and the Wii.

== Plot ==
The player takes the role of various heroes from the Medal of Honor series. There are three different campaigns, each with its own hero that spearheads squads to complete objectives. These heroes are: Lieutenant Jimmy Patterson, who was the star of the original Medal of Honor and Medal of Honor: Frontline, Sergeant John Baker from Medal of Honor: Allied Assault Breakthrough, and Lt. William Holt from Medal of Honor: European Assault. The campaigns take place in Italy, the Netherlands, and Belgium.

After the player beats the Battle of the Bulge in Belgium, they are treated to the end cinematic. It shows that Patterson proposed to Manon, but the mission briefer adds that a response has not been reported yet.

== Gameplay ==
Objectives include sabotage, infiltration, capturing certain objectives. Most missions in each campaign include the player blowing something up, killing a certain number of enemies, stealing enemy intel, and then sometimes returning to a certain location to escape. There are three different levels to be attained in each level: bronze, silver and gold. To score bronze, the player must complete all primary objectives. To score silver, the player must complete the primary and secondary objectives. Gold is the same as silver but the player must have high accuracy and kills. Obtaining these different levels increases the player's rank and helps the player complete the game to 100%. Through gameplay, players may unlock skins to use in multiplayer and skirmish mode.

=== Multiplayer ===
Heroes features an online multiplayer that allows for 32 players in a match. It also lets the player access real weapons. These include the M1 Garand, Thompson submachine gun, M1911 pistol, and bazooka. Gameplay modes include Deathmatch, Infiltration, Demolition, Hold the Line, Battlelines, and Domination. Unlike most other online multiplayer games, no points are awarded even if the player successfully brings an enemy flag back to the base and scores. The game also has a ranking system that gives players' ranks by their kill-death ratios. It also has a top 100 leaderboard and the ranking system goes to 10,000-1.

Electronic Arts terminated online multiplayer functionality for the Heroes duology on August 11, 2011, although players have bypassed the shutdown by leveraging XLink Kai or ad hoc Party, the software that connects all players worldwide, provided that they have access to a wireless router.

== Reception ==
Reception

Aggregate score
Aggregator	Score
Metacritic	71/100

Review scores
Publication	Score
Eurogamer	5/10
Game Informer	6.75/10
GamePro	3.25/5
GameSpot	7.3/10
GameSpy	3.5/5
IGN	(US) 8.4/10 (UK) 6.9/10
PlayStation Official Magazine – UK	8/10
Official U.S. PlayStation Magazine	8/10
PlayStation: The Official Magazine	7/10
X-Play	4/5

The game received "average" reviews according to video game review aggregator website Metacritic.
