= Medal of Honor (2010 video game) =

- Developers: Danger Close Games (single-player); DICE (multiplayer); EA Mobile (J2ME)
- Publisher: Electronic Arts
- Director: Drew Stauffer
- Producers: Greg Goodrich; Patrick Liu
- Designer: Antonio Barnes
- Programmer: Paul Keet
- Artist: Beau Anderson
- Composer: Ramin Djawadi
- Series: Medal of Honor
- Engine: Unreal Engine 3 (single-player); Frostbite 1.5 (multiplayer)
- Platforms: Microsoft Windows; PlayStation 3; Xbox 360; J2ME
- Release: NA: October 12, 2010; AU: October 14, 2010; EU: October 15, 2010
- Genre: First-person shooter
- Modes: Single-player, multiplayer

Medal of Honor is a 2010 first-person shooter game developed by Danger Close Games and DICE and published by Electronic Arts. It is a reboot of the Medal of Honor video game series and the thirteenth installment in the series. The game was released for Microsoft Windows, PlayStation 3, Xbox 360 and J2ME in October 2010. While the previous titles were set during World War II, Medal of Honor takes place during the War in Afghanistan. The game is loosely based on parts of Operation Anaconda; specifically, the events surrounding the Battle of Roberts Ridge.

Development of Medal of Honor began in 2007 following the release of Medal of Honor: Vanguard, Medal of Honor: Airborne, and Medal of Honor: Heroes 2. EA DICE was recruited to develop the multiplayer component of the game. Medal of Honor's single-player campaign uses a modified Unreal Engine 3 while multiplayer uses the Frostbite Engine. It is the first game in the Medal of Honor series to be given a "Mature" rating from the ESRB.

Medal of Honor received positive reviews from critics upon release. Praise was directed at the game's engaging multiplayer, audio and voice acting, the explosive, gritty and realistic single-player campaign while criticism was directed at the short length of the campaign, minor technical issues, and resemblances to other similar games like Call of Duty and Battlefield. The game was a commercial success for Electronic Arts, selling 5 million copies from October to November. A sequel, Medal of Honor: Warfighter, also developed by Danger Close Games, was released in October 2012.

== Gameplay ==
Medal of Honor is a modern warfare first-person shooter. Gameplay focuses on portraying operations set in Afghanistan.

=== Single-player ===
The game's single-player campaign features typical in-game objectives include raiding enemy hideouts and calling in airstrikes on enemy positions. The modification of Unreal Engine 3 allows players to slide to cover and perform other combat maneuvers. Players can request ammo from teammates in the single-player campaign, though this is limited.

=== Multiplayer ===
A player approaches a small firefight taking place on a ridge.

Medal of Honor's multiplayer is class based, with three classes available – Rifleman, Special Ops, and Sniper. The player earns experience during gameplay to level up and unlock additional weapons and weapon accessories. For example, at the start of the game the sniper class does not have a proper sniper scope available, and the player must reach level 3 to unlock a combat scope. If a player earns a certain number of points before dying, called a score chain, they will be granted the choice of an offensive support action such as a mortar strike or missile attack or a defensive support action such as intel or ammo. The player is not limited to one support action per life and can earn them continuously.

Gameplay features two opposing sides, the Coalition, usually referred by the in-game battle chatter to as "Python 1", against the Opposing Forces. The Coalition troops use American equipment such as the M16A4, M4A1, M21, AT4 and M9 pistol, while the Opposing Forces represent forces similar to the Taliban and use according equipment such as the AK-47, AKS-74U, SVD, RPG-7, and "Tariq" pistol. Each weapon is designed to have a counterpart on both teams, although that counterpart may or may not have the same stats. Initially, the weapons are team-specific. However, as the player progresses, they will unlock weapons that are available for both sides, as well as unlocking the ability to use enemy weapons. Once reaching level 8 in any one class the player is considered Tier 1 and assumes a different appearance, and when killed the tier 1 player's killer receives 5 extra points for killing a tier 1 player.

On November 2, 2010, DICE released two DLCs for multiplayer—a game type called "Hot Zone", which is a king-of-the-hill style mode and another game type called "Clean Sweep", a last-man-standing game type.

The game's online servers along with Medal of Honor: Airborne and Medal of Honor Warfighter were shut down on February 22, 2023.

== Campaign ==
=== Characters and setting ===
Medal of Honor takes place in Afghanistan. For half of the game, players assume the role of a Navy SEAL DEVGRU operator codenamed Rabbit, a member of AFO Neptune. For the remainder, the player alternates between the roles of a Delta Force sniper codenamed Deuce of AFO Wolfpack, a U.S. Army Ranger Specialist Dante Adams of the 1st Battalion, 75th Ranger Regiment unit Bravo One-Six, and an AH-64 Apache gunner Brad "Hawk" Hawkins.

Rabbit's teammates of Neptune consists of team leader Mother (Jeffrey Pierce), second in command Voodoo (Jon Bruno), and Preacher (Dustin James Leighton). Deuce's fellow members of Wolfpack are team leader Panther (Kevin Kilner), second in command Vegas (Michael Filipowich), and Deuce's mentor and partner Dusty (Chris Fries). Adams' squad mates include squad leader Sergeant Patterson (Joe Cappelletti), Tech Sergeant Ybarra (Yuri Lowenthal) and Corporal Hernandez (Daniel Betances).

Other non playable characters include Colonel Drucker (Adrian Holmes), codenamed Jimmy (Rick Pasqualone), and Drucker's commanding officer General Flagg (Doug Abrahams).

=== Plot ===
The story begins in late 2001 during the opening days of the invasion of Afghanistan. AFO Neptune, composed of Tier 1 DEVGRU SEALs codenamed Mother, Voodoo, Preacher, and Rabbit, are sent to meet with an Afghan informant named Tariq who has intelligence on the Taliban. Neptune is ambushed by Chechen jihadists, and fights their way through the village to recover Tariq. He informs them that the Taliban and Al-Qaeda have a significant force of 500 to 1,000 combatants in the Shah-i-Kot Valley. Before dealing with them, though, Neptune is tasked to secure Bagram Airfield with a contingent from the ANA. By March 2002, the airfield is re-purposed as a base by NATO forces. U.S. Army Colonel R. Drucker, commander of all local forces, is a cautious and competent officer in contrast to his commanding officer, General Flagg, a career-oriented officer directing the war from his office in the United States who is dismissive of the AFO teams' capabilities. While Drucker plans to use the Tier 1 operatives to reconnoitre insurgent positions in the valley and then have Afghan Northern Alliance soldiers eliminate them, Flagg is mistrusting of the locals and gives the Colonel a 24-hour deadline to deploy the 10th Mountain Division, the 101st Airborne Division, and the 75th Rangers.

Meanwhile, AFO Wolfpack, consisting of four Delta Force operators code-named Panther, Vegas, Deuce, and Dusty, infiltrate the valley and proceed to their observation point "Clementine" while AFO Neptune moves to "OP Dorothy". Drucker sends a task force of Northern Alliance soldiers led by United States Army Special Forces teams to eliminate several insurgent positions. Flagg, angry that Drucker still has not deployed conventional US infantry, unknowingly orders an AC-130U crew to open fire on the Afghan/US task force. The surviving Northern Alliance forces panic and withdraw, leaving the Colonel no choice but to deploy the Rangers as ordered. During insertion into the Sha-i-kot Valley, the Rangers come under heavy fire and a Chinook is shot down. A fireteam led by Sergeant Patterson consisting of Specialist Dante Adams, Corporal Hernandez, and Tactical Air Control Party (TACP) Tech Sergeant Ybarra, flank the enemy positions and destroy the machine guns. They move to secure an LZ for extraction, but are ambushed by numerous insurgents. Surrounded and running out of ammunition, Ybarra radios Bagram for reinforcements, which arrive in the form of a pair of AH-64 Apaches, saving them from being overrun. The Apaches move through the mountains destroying a Taliban armory and enemy mortar positions. As they return to base, a Taliban ZU-23-2 anti-aircraft gun crew attempts to shoot the helicopters but are killed by sniper fire from Deuce.

Deuce and Dusty move up the mountain, eliminating enemy positions and providing sniper support for AFO Neptune, which is in heavy contact on the adjacent mountain, Takur Ghar. Takur Ghar was the location of fierce fighting between US Special Operations Forces and al-Qaeda and Taliban insurgents, during Operation Anaconda in March 2002. Neptune withdraws over the ridge line, and fights their way to the extraction point. Mother and Rabbit make it to the helicopter, but the Chinook is damaged by heavy enemy fire and forced to leave Voodoo and Preacher behind. Defying orders to return to base, Mother and Rabbit re-insert at nighttime, barely escaping death when their Chinook comes under fire and crash lands. They search for Voodoo and Preacher but are eventually compromised and Rabbit is severely wounded in the firefight. The two jump off a cliff in an attempt to escape pursuit but are captured by insurgents. Back at Bagram, General Flagg refuses to risk additional losses and orders them to pull back and reassess, dooming the SEALs. Defying orders, Drucker instead sends in the Ranger Quick Reaction Force to extract Neptune.

While on approach, the QRF Chinook is hit by heavy fire and crash lands. After securing the crash site, Hernandez, Ybarra, Adams, and Patterson head for the mountain pass. Hernandez is wounded while attempting to open a spider-hole and Ybarra brings him back to the landing zone for treatment. Adams and Patterson link up with Preacher and Voodoo. After engaging multiple enemy strongholds with the help of a CIA Predator drone, they locate Mother and the grievously wounded Rabbit. Rabbit's condition worsens and, despite his squad-mates' aid, he succumbs to his wounds before extraction arrives. While observing a pair of F-15Es bombing the remaining insurgent bunkers, Preacher collects a rabbit's foot charm from Rabbit's body; Mother and Preacher then note that the war is far from over.

In an epilogue, Preacher and Ajab (a CIA asset) converse with each other in Pashto while observing the street. They identify the man they are looking out for and move to approach him before the screen cuts to black.

== Development ==
EA Los Angeles began development of Medal of Honor in 2007 after the release of the three titles Medal of Honor: Vanguard, Medal of Honor: Airborne, and Medal of Honor: Heroes 2. Instead of pursuing another World War II title, EA Los Angeles decided to take the series to the modern era. In July 2010, EA Los Angeles was rebranded to Danger Close Games to focus on the development of Medal of Honor games. Danger Close Games consulted with U.S. Special Operations soldiers in order to make the game feel realistic, and make players understand what they have to go through as an actual operator. EA DICE, best known as the creators of Battlefield series, was tasked by Electronic Arts to develop the multiplayer mode for the game. Medal of Honor was the first game in the series to receive an M rating in the United States.

At the Game Developers Conference 2010, it was announced that the PS3 would be the lead development platform.

Electronic Arts released multiplayer beta keys for the PlayStation 3 and PC on June 21, 2010. The Xbox 360 beta was initially delayed, but eventually opened on July 20, 2010. The beta featured 3 different weapon classes, two different maps and two different game modes. EA announced a PC open beta for Medal of Honor which ran from October 4, 2010 to October 7, 2010, 11:59 PDT.

== Marketing and release ==
Linkin Park's "New Divide" was featured in the 2010 E3 multiplayer trailer. Another Linkin Park song, entitled "The Catalyst", was featured in the final Medal of Honor trailer set released on August 1, 2010. The trailer featuring the song was directed by Linkin Park's own Joe Hahn. The song was featured in the end credits of the game. The music for the game was composed by Emmy-nominated composer Ramin Djawadi, who recorded his score with ethnic instruments, electronics, and a string orchestra in Los Angeles. A soundtrack album was released on iTunes on October 5, 2010. A book written by Chris Ryan was released around the time as the game and explains the backstory of the game. Through the EA Gun Club website players who registered on the site and bought the VIP version of Battlefield: Bad Company 2 were granted the M24 Sniper Weapon System sniper rifle for multiplayer immediately upon the game's release.

=== Editions ===
The Limited Edition version of Medal of Honor includes an invite to the Battlefield 3 beta and a disc to download Medal of Honor: Frontline. Frontline is available only in the PlayStation 3 version. The Limited Edition will also feature content out-of-the-box such as early access to weapons attainable only via upgrades and a Limited Edition exclusive Heckler & Koch MP7 personal defense weapon and the M60 Light Machine Gun.

After the announcement of the Limited Edition, EA Los Angeles stated that they would release a special Tier 1 Edition in Europe. The Tier 1 edition costs the same as the Limited Edition and features the same benefits as the Limited Edition (including the Battlefield 3 Beta Key). Additionally, owners of the Tier 1 Edition will receive a code to have access to the Class Operational Tier 1, "a select group of soldiers in order to unlock the M60 Light Machine Gun". The Tier 1 Edition was released in Europe, on October 15, for all three platforms.

== Music ==
The official soundtrack was released on September 28, 2010. An extended version of the soundtrack was released in the Medal of Honor Soundtrack Collection (which contains all of the music in the Medal of Honor franchise released up to that point) which was released on March 1, 2011.

== Reception ==
=== Critical response ===
Reception

Aggregate score
Aggregator	Score
Metacritic	PC: 72/100; PS3: 75/100; X360: 74/100

Review scores
Publication	Score
1Up.com	B
Edge	7/10
Eurogamer	8/10
Game Informer	7/10
GameSpot	7.5/10
IGN	PS3/X360: 6/10; PC: 6.5/10
Joystiq	4/5

Medal of Honor has received generally positive reviews from critics, praising the game's engaging multiplayer, audio and voice acting but criticizing minor technical issues, and resemblances to other similar games like Call of Duty and EA's very own Battlefield series. Aggregating review website Metacritic gave the PlayStation 3 version 75/100, the Xbox 360 version 74/100, and the PC version 72/100. Game Informer scored it a 7 out of 10. Eurogamer acknowledged that Medal of Honor has "a solid multiplayer accessory that owes a lot to Bad Company 2", and gave it an 8/10. Joystiq commended the single player experience but faulted the game's graphical power: "The framerate is shaky, and the lackluster texture work certainly doesn't help", stating that the single-player is ultimately enjoyable. However, Joystiq states that the game's "initial impressions coupled with the obvious lack of features give me little reason to abandon Call of Duty's multiplayer offerings", and gives it a 4 out of 5 stars. According to Wedbush Securities analyst Michael Pachter, "Shares [are] down because apparently some investors are disappointed by these early reviews." In a return statement, EA reminded the investors that critic's reviews are "highly subjective" and that "This is an essentially big achievement considering Medal of Honor has been dormant for several years. This is the first year in rebooting the franchise. Medal of Honor is part of a larger EA strategy to take share in the shooter category. This is a marathon, not a sprint – today's Medal of Honor launch represents a step forward in that race."

=== Taliban player choice controversy ===
The online mode created a controversy when it was revealed that in the multiplayer mode of Medal of Honor, players could play as the Taliban. The developers responded by stating the reality of the game necessitated it. "Most of us having been doing this since we were 7 – if someone's the cop, someone's gotta be the robber, someone's gotta be the pirate and someone's gotta be the alien", Amanda Taggart, senior PR manager for EA, told AOL News. "In Medal of Honor multiplayer, someone's gotta be the Taliban." The UK Defence Secretary Liam Fox criticized the game in advance of its release stating that it was "shocking that someone would think it acceptable to recreate the acts of the Taliban against British soldiers. At the hands of the Taliban, children have lost fathers and wives have lost husbands. It's hard to believe any citizen of our country would wish to buy such a thoroughly un-British game. I would urge retailers to show their support for our armed forces and ban this tasteless product."

Canadian Defense Minister Peter MacKay has also criticized the game, saying he "finds it wrong that anyone, children in particular, would be playing the role of Taliban" and that "Canada and its allies have fought far too long in Afghanistan and it's not a game". Some Danish veterans were appalled by the game that takes place in the Helmand province where Danish troops are stationed. Danish Defense Minister Gitte Lillelund Bech finds it "tasteless" and supports Danish veterans who oppose the game. However she has said she will not legislate on the subject and has confidence in the ability of Danish youth to discriminate between right and wrong. Various branches of the US military, including the US Navy and US Army and Air Force Exchange Services have banned the sale of the game on all United States military bases worldwide, but military personnel can still buy the game off base and it will be allowed on base. The reason given by a spokesperson for the US Navy was that it is, "out of respect for the men and women serving and their families."

Due to pressure from various military officials and veterans organizations, the word Taliban was removed from the multiplayer part of the game and instead replaced with the term "Opposing Force." The singleplayer campaign as well as overall gameplay was not affected by the change. However, even in light of this change, the game was still not sold on military bases. The AAFES Commander Maj. Gen. Bruce Casella said, "Out of respect to those touched by the ongoing, real-life events presented as a game, Exchanges will not be carrying this product." He continued, "I expect the military families who are authorized to shop the Exchange are aware, and understanding, of the decision not to carry this particular offering."

=== Sales ===
At the time of the release, Medal of Honor had the highest number of pre-orders in the series. The game debuted at #1 on the UK sales chart, beating out FIFA 11 and Just Dance 2. In the United States, Medal of Honor was the third best-selling game in October behind NBA 2K11 and Fallout: New Vegas, selling 1.5 million copies in its first week of release, and eventually 2 million units in its second week.

On February 1, 2011, EA reported that the reboot of Medal of Honor was a commercial success with over 5 million copies sold from October to November along with Need for Speed: Hot Pursuit. "It's on a sharp uptick the last couple of years as we've driven high-quality titles ever higher in the charts, particularly in Europe but also in North America," John Riccitiello, EA CEO, said during the publisher's overnight Q3 earnings call.

=== Accolades ===
During the 14th Annual Interactive Achievement Awards, the Academy of Interactive Arts & Sciences nominated Medal of Honor for "Outstanding Achievement in Sound Design" and "Outstanding Achievement in Visual Engineering".

List of awards and nominations
Year	Award	Category	Result	Ref.
2011	Game Audio Network Guild Awards	Best Cinematic/Cut-Scene Audio	Nominated	
2011	Guild of Music Supervisors Awards	Best Music Supervision for a Video Game	Nominated	

== Sequel ==
A sequel to Medal of Honor, Medal of Honor: Warfighter was released in October 2012. The sequel received mixed reviews and was a commercial disappointment.
