= Medal of Honor: Airborne =

2007 video game

- Developer: EA Los Angeles
- Publisher: Electronic Arts
- Director: Jon Paquette
- Producer: Patrick Gilmore
- Designer: Rex Dickson
- Programmer: Simon Myszko
- Artists: Justin Thomas; James H. Dargie
- Composer: Michael Giacchino
- Series: Medal of Honor
- Engine: Unreal Engine 3
- Platforms: Mobile phone Microsoft Windows; Xbox 360; PlayStation 3
- Release: August 28, 2007: Mobile; NA: August 28, 2007 Microsoft Windows & Xbox 360; NA: September 4, 2007; EU: September 7, 2007; AU: September 13, 2007 PlayStation 3; EU: November 16, 2007; NA: November 19, 2007; AU: December 6, 2007
- Genre: First-person shooter
- Modes: Single-player, multiplayer

Medal of Honor: Airborne is a first-person shooter game developed by EA Los Angeles and released worldwide on mobile phones in August 2007, on Microsoft Windows and Xbox 360 in September 2007, and on PlayStation 3 in November 2007. It is the 11th installment of the Medal of Honor video game series, and uses a modified version of Unreal Engine 3. In the game's single-player mode, players assume the role of an American paratrooper in the US 82nd Airborne Division who is airdropped with his squadrons and fights against hostile forces across six large missions that take place during the latter half of the European theater of World War II, while in its online multiplayer mode, players can choose to fight as Allied soldiers that parachute into the battlefield, or as Axis soldiers who defend on the ground.

Unlike previous games in the series that employed a linear style of gameplay in its single-player mode, in which the start point and direction is already laid out, Airborne employs a more nonlinear gameplay style in both modes, in that players can start their game anywhere in the map that they land in and complete the majority of a mission's objectives in any order.

The game has received more favorable reviews for the PC and PlayStation 3 versions than its Xbox 360 version. While the game was planned to have versions made for PlayStation 2, Wii, and Xbox, these were later cancelled, with the first two consoles having Medal of Honor: Vanguard as an exclusive title between them instead.

== Gameplay ==
In both modes of gameplay, players have access to three different categories of weapons that they can use in battles, either selected before or acquired during a game - Main Weapons, covering rifles, sub-machine guns, auto/assault rifles, shotguns and anti-tank weapons; Side-arms, which have infinite ammo and are mainly used as a back-up when out of ammo for main weapons; and grenades. Traditional game mechanics for the game such as crouching and "cooking" grenades, are complemented with the ability to lean out of cover to take shots at enemies, while players may also engage opponents in close combat. Like many games in the Medal of Honor series, players have a health bar, divided into four units, that begins to deplete when taking damage; if the player avoids taking any damage, the current unit of health being depleted will regenerate in time, but any units lost will require the player to find first aid kits. The HUD allows the player to keep track of what weapon they are using, the amount of ammo they have in it and on hand to reload it with, how many grenades they have, and a compass that keeps track of where allies and enemies are, along with markers indicating which direction a player is being damaged from and where active grenades have landed.

What makes Airborne unique in the series is the ability for players to choose where they land as a paratrooper on the battlefield in both modes. Once a player begins descending onto the map they are fighting on, they can direct where they will begin from, controlling the speed of the descent, thus giving greater flexibility and strategy on how they deal with enemies, with the added ability of being able to kick enemies they land upon.

=== Single-player ===
In the game's main campaign, players assume the role of a fictional paratrooper working alongside other members of an American airborne division, to complete a series of objectives within each of the campaign's six missions. The player is given a briefing on each mission's initial objectives, as well as a map of where they will be operating, including the location of heavy enemy concentrations (marked red) and safe landing sites (marked green). In this mode of gameplay, players can equip two main weapons, designated as primary and secondary weapons, and chose what loadout they have before beginning a mission from a selection of Allied and Axis weapons; additional weapons can be unlocked by either taking those dropped by enemy soldiers during a mission or reaching later missions where they become available in. During missions, weapons earn experience from killing enemies, with the amount per kill greatly increased from performing headshots, melee and multiple kills. Once a weapon earns enough experience, it receives an upgrade that improves how effective it is for the player, with upgrades ranging from increased damage, a higher rate of fire, and reduced weapon recoil. Each weapon can be upgraded three times, and has its own set of upgrades; once it is fully upgraded, the weapon's icon on the interface changes to reflects its fully upgraded appearance.

When descending by parachute into a mission's battlefield, the type of landing the player makes affects the speed at which they can begin to fight - "Greased" landings, by moving forward before touching down, allow the player to be ready instantly to fight; "Flared" landings allow the player to land safely, but require a little time to be combat-ready; "Botched" landings, by coming in too hard, cause the player to be more vulnerable to attack as they recover and become combat-ready. The player can also perform a "Skill" drop, by landing safely and in a specific way, at a site designated by a white parachute (i.e. landing through an open doorway); each mission has a set number that the player can find on when on the ground, and which they can attempt at any time when their character is descending down onto a mission's battlefield. Once in a mission, players do not face enemies with randomized appearances and weapons, but rather a predetermined selection of enemy types; while the player faces the weakest kind to begin with, more difficult and challenging opponents are introduced as the game progresses.

Each mission the player undertakes consists of two phases. In the first phase, gameplay is non-linear; in addition to choosing where they wish to land, players can decide the order in which objectives are completed, though they are restricted to landing and moving within the area of the map that is accessible to them. If the player is killed during this phase of a mission, they re-spawn in the air, descending down to the battlefield once more, and can thus take advantage of this to put themselves in a more favourable position to complete an objective. Upon completing the objectives outlined in a mission's briefing, the game's second phase begins and focuses on a more scripted and linear path, with objectives unlocked in sequence and a new area of the map becoming accessible. In this phase, the player no longer can parachute back down to the mission's map, instead re-spawning to the last checkpoint they reached.

=== Multiplayer ===
In the game's multiplayer mode, players work as a team, playing as either Allied or Axis soldiers, over six maps - while the game uses three from the single-player mode, along with another that is scaled down in size, the other two maps are original design. In a match, players begin by choosing what main weapon they begin with - rifle, SMG, auto-rifle, sniper and anti-tank - which is denoted by what role they are in (i.e. for SMG, Allies get the Thompson, while Axis get the MP40), and can scavenge a second main weapon during the match. If a player is killed, they can change what weapon they use before they respawn, though lose the second weapon they scavenged. Matches can be set to one of three modes - Airborne Objective (a variation on the "seize-the-objective" multiplayer mode), Airborne Team Deathmatch, and Team Deatchmatch - with the airborne-based modes utilising Airborne's unique paratrooper aspects of gameplay, in which Allied players can land wherever they want on the map being used, including when they respawn, but are vulnerable during their descent as Axis players can shoot them down.

Players can acquire access to weapon upgrades, similar to those in single-player, depending on what type of match they undertake - unranked matches grant access to upgrades and allow match's server settings to be optimized per what the player(s) want; ranked matches focus on persistent character development that grant gradual access to upgrades over time.

The game's online servers along with Medal of Honor (2010) and Medal of Honor: Warfighter were shut down on February 22, 2023.

== Plot ==
In 1943, following training in North Africa, Private Boyd Travers learns that the 82nd Airborne Division is to help with the invasion of Italy, beginning with Operation Husky. After nearly being killed by friendly fire from the US Navy, Travers and his platoon land in the village of Adanti, Sicily, where the group assists in neutralising several anti-aircraft nests while combating Italian soldiers, before venturing deeper into the village to find a missing sniper team and aiding his squadron in repelling a German counterattack. Travelling to the Italian mainland, the 82nd take part in Operation Avalanche, eliminating a munitions stockpile, fuel depot, motorpool, and radio equipment at the Paestum archaeological dig near Naples, with Travers assisting in an assault on a ruined temple housing anti-air guns, destroying them before Allied P-40 fighter bombers arrive and destroy the German artillery located around the dig site.

One year later, on June 6, 1944, the 82nd take part in Operation Neptune, lending assistance to the American forces preparing to land on Utah Beach as part of Operation Overlord. Working with his squadron, Travers manages to eliminate all potential threats to the invasion force, including a Tiger tank and a series of bunkers, before heading to the shoreline and eliminating German pillboxes that endanger the incoming landing forces. A few months later, Travers and his squadron take part in Operation Market Garden, assisting in the capture of Nijmegen in the Netherlands, while preventing the Germans from destroying the town's bridge with explosives planted on it. Despite a fierce counterattack, including the use of Panzerschreck rocket launchers and Tiger tanks, the 82nd manage to secure the bridge for American Sherman tanks to cross, while Travers receives a promotion to Corporal for his actions.

After Market Garden ends in failure for the Allies, Travers transfers to the 17th Airborne Division. In March 1945, his division takes part in Operation Varsity, landing within an industrial complex in Essen, Germany, to destroy its stockpile of munitions and tanks, while shutting down its weapon production facilities. Despite a counter-attack by heavily armored Allgemeine SS troopers wielding MG42s that inflict heavy losses on the Allied troops, Travers manages to overcome the new threat and successfully destroys an armoured ammunition train that arrives at the complex. A few days later, with Operation Varsity proceeding as planned, Travers finds his squadron going deeper into enemy-held territory within Essen, with the task of destroying a massive flak tower that Allied bombers had failed to level. Despite heavy opposition, Travers helps to neutralize key fortifications within the tower, before assisting an engineering unit and detonating charges placed beneath the tower, destroying the structure as the war in Europe begins to enter its final stages.

In a closing report, Travers' CO comments on how history will remember the sacrifice and courage of the men in the Airborne divisions for what they did during World War II.

== Development ==
Development of Airborne started in late 2004 when the game designers wanted a new game that would "really revolutionize the Medal of Honor scene". The idea of a paratrooper-based gameplay came up and as such a free-roaming environment was needed, which became the key focus of the game. Each mission starts with a jump and the developers wanted to make the experience as nonlinear as possible, with no starting points and as such the scenario unfolding in a different way each time, as opposed to previous World War II FPS games where there is a set starting and end point.

The lead designer was Rex Dickson, and the executive producer was Patrick Gilmore, who previously worked on Medal of Honor: Allied Assault. The development team even had an actual historical advisor, who is an enthusiast on the Airborne forces and weapons of World War II, attempting to ensure historical accuracy and authenticity. Each sound was recorded from hundreds of real World War II-era artifacts including real weapons, tanks, and one of the last remaining airworthy C-47s.

Originally, the game was going to include pathfinder missions done by soldier Eddie LaPointe that would include more stealth. They would come before Travers' drop. This was later cut as EA wanted to simplify the action and focus on large scale fights with Travers instead. EA signed partnership with Jeep to feature drivable vehicles in the game. This was taken out of the final version as well, because levels were made with cramped spaces and short roads and alleys, so there was no room left to drive.

Allies about to advance on an Italian position in Operation Husky

Airborne was developed in close consultation with the Medal of Honor community, via forums and summits. Certain community leaders who run Airborne fan-sites were invited to a multiplayer preview summit in July 2007, and many problems were identified that would hamper the game's popularity within the MOH community, the most important ones being lack of a dedicated server and issues with mouse lag and low frame rate. As a result of the summit, the most critical issues were able to be fixed in time for the game's release, and the other issues in time for the first patch.

A single-player demo was released on August 23, 2007, featuring the first half of Operation Husky.

=== Game engine ===
Airborne uses a heavily modified version of the Unreal Engine 3 engine. The game's core development was started with EA's acquired Renderware engine, but it made the switch to the Unreal 3 engine in early 2006 which delayed the game by over a year. The engine was specifically designed for DirectX 9 and 10 PCs, PlayStation 3 and the Xbox 360, and supports many rendering techniques utilized within the graphics capabilities of Airborne, including HDRR, per-pixel lighting and dynamic shadows.

=== AI awareness ===
Because of the non-linear gameplay style of Airborne, the developers had to build an entirely new artificial intelligence system to deal with the many ways the player can interact with or approach the computer-controlled allied and enemy soldiers (NPCs), and for them to react to the situation accordingly. With "Affordance A.I.", the characters have an awareness of enemy approach patterns, and also features of the terrain and urban infrastructure that provide a tactical advantage, such as cover, high ground and open doorways. This allows AI characters to take intelligent combat actions based on their surroundings, as opposed to the scripted movements of previous linear FPS games.

Airborne uses two systems to guide the physical and emotional reactions of the AI characters to what is happening around them. "E-cap" (emotion capture) is used to create more human-like emotions on the characters' faces by blending an awareness of their surroundings and other NPCs, for example an AI soldier that started to move forward would jump back for cover if an ally next to him was shot.

== Audio ==
Medal of Honor: Airborne Original Soundtrack

Soundtrack album by Michael Giacchino
- Released: July 31, 2007
- Recorded: 2006–2007
- Genre: Orchestral
- Length: 63:23
- Label: E.A.R.S.

Professional ratings
Review scores
Source	Rating
Game Music Online	7/10

Medal of Honor: Airborne Original Soundtrack was released on July 31, 2007. It features the in-game tracks and musical scores of the game, all of which were composed by the award-winning Michael Giacchino, who also composed scores for some of the previous Medal of Honor games, including the main theme for the whole series.

The first scoring session was held at the Paramount Scoring Stage in Hollywood on April 20, 2006, to score the teaser trailer that would premiere at the Electronic Entertainment Expo (E3) in the summer of 2006. A 75-piece orchestra, conducted by Marshall Bowen, performed the music. Eight months later, Giacchino was wrangling a few projects, including Lost and Ratatouille, and it was decided that instead of trying to blast through the writing process and compose all of the music for 2-days of recording, it would be best to focus on one day of recording, and then record the rest of the music in the spring when the game's development had progressed sufficiently.

On December 11, 2006, Giacchino recorded the first round of cues for the game with the Hollywood Studio Symphony at the Eastwood Scoring Stage at Warner Bros. Four months after that, on March 28, 2007, the final round of music was recorded.

The Airborne soundtrack has been said to be based on the Medal of Honor themes of the past, but "brings a dark uncertainty that communicates the ominous journey of the first US Airborne combat troops".

In addition to the new soundtrack the game also re-uses scores from five of the series' previous games, these being Medal of Honor, Medal of Honor: Underground, Medal of Honor: Allied Assault, Medal of Honor: Frontline and Medal of Honor: Pacific Assault.

Track listing (63:23)
No.	Title	Length
1.	"Medal of Honor - Airborne (Main Theme)"	3:48
2.	"Operation Husky"	3:27
3.	"Back Alleys"	2:24
4.	"In the Trenches"	2:34
5.	"Restoration Temple"	2:46
6.	"Gunfight in the Ruins"	5:24
7.	"Operation Neptune"	2:34
8.	"Following the Demolition Wires"	1:06
9.	"Room by Room"	2:23
10.	"Unblocking Utah"	2:43
11.	"Operation Varsity"	3:38
12.	"Sniper Showdown"	3:16
13.	"Das Flakturm"	2:36
14.	"Destroying the Fuel Reserves"	2:29
15.	"Dropping into Nijmegen"	3:00
16.	"Wreckage of Nijmegen"	7:04
17.	"Defusing the Charges"	2:37
18.	"Taking out the Sighting Tower"	2:30
19.	"Paestum Landing"	2:50
20.	"Medal of Honor - Airborne (End Credits)"	4:14

iTunes exclusives
No.	Title	Length
1.	"Multiplayer Allies"	0:31
2.	"Multiplayer Axis"	0:34

== Reception ==
Reception

Aggregate score
Aggregator	Score			
Aggregator	mobile	PC	PS3	Xbox 360
Metacritic		78/100	75/100	73/100

Review scores
Publication	Score			
Publication	mobile	PC	PS3	Xbox 360
Eurogamer				8/10
Game Informer		7.25/10		7.25/10
GameRevolution				D+
GameSpot		7/10	7/10	7/10
GameSpy		3.5/5		3.5/5
IGN	7.9/10	7.9/10	7.9/10	7.9/10
Official Xbox Magazine (US)				7.5/10
PC Gamer (US)		88%		
PlayStation: The Official Magazine			3.5/5	

The PC and PlayStation 3 versions received "favorable" reviews, while the Xbox 360 version received "average" reviews, according to video game review aggregator website Metacritic.

GameSpot was mixed but ultimately favorable in its review, concluding that "The single-player campaign doesn't get cooking until the last two levels, but those two levels combined with solid multiplayer make it worth enlisting in Airborne." IGN was more positive, stating that "Airborne, while not perfect, is definitely the best game in the franchise to come along in quite a while." Press Start Online wrote that Airborne was "a Medal of Honor game that's not only good, it demonstrates a level of imagination and innovation that's becoming increasingly rare in the genre." Most reviewers praised the music from the games of Medal of Honor, with IGN stating in particular that the title music was said to bring back some classic memories from Allied Assault and the starting music for Operation Market Garden for Campaign.
