= Medal of Honor: Frontline =

2002 video game

- Developer: EA Los Angeles (Note: The PS3 version was developed by Danger Close Games.)
- Publisher: Electronic Arts (Note: Released under the EA Games brand name.)
- Director: Brett Close
- Producers: Scott J. Langteau; John H. Garcia Shelton; Tarrnie Williams
- Designers: Christopher Cross; Eric Church
- Programmer: Marshall Robin
- Artists: Dmitri Ellingson; David Prout
- Composer: Michael Giacchino
- Series: Medal of Honor
- Platforms: PlayStation 2; GameCube; Xbox; PlayStation 3
- Release: May 29, 2002: PlayStation 2; NA: May 29, 2002; EU: June 7, 2002; GameCube & Xbox; NA: November 7, 2002; EU: December 6, 2002; PlayStation 3; NA: October 12, 2010; AU: October 14, 2010; EU: October 15, 2010
- Genre: First-person shooter
- Modes: Single-player, multiplayer

Medal of Honor: Frontline is a first-person shooter video game in the Medal of Honor series, developed by EA Los Angeles and published by Electronic Arts. It was released in North America for the PlayStation 2 on May 29, 2002, and for the GameCube and Xbox on November 7, 2002. The player character is Lt. Jimmy Patterson, from the American Office of Strategic Services. Frontline takes place during the events of the first game and chronicles Patterson's journey as he fights his way across Europe into Nazi Germany during World War II.

Developed by EA Los Angeles, it was the first Medal of Honor game by the studio after being purchased by Electronic Arts from DreamWorks SKG and Microsoft in February 2000. It is also the first game in the series without the involvement of Steven Spielberg, creator of the series. In 2010, an HD port of the game, developed by Danger Close Games, was included in the "Limited Edition" PlayStation 3 version of Medal of Honor.

== Gameplay ==
A screenshot of the gameplay

Frontline is a first-person shooter where players take control of the protagonist player character in a first-person perspective where they fight through levels set during the Second World War against the Wehrmacht using historical weaponry of the era, performing a series of military operations. Briefings take place at the start of each mission, which advance the plot and introduce new characters. Each mission is structured through a number of linear levels, each with differing locations, levels of action and styles of gameplay. Initially the player character begins on the frontlines during D-Day backed up by other computer AI-controlled soldiers with an emphasis on fast action-orientated gun-based gameplay. As the story progress however, the player character is sent on a variety of other missions including a number of covert and undercover operations in locations such as military bases, German-occupied towns and manors, submarines and countryside settings. The player character is tasked with objectives during levels that range from infiltration, espionage, rescue and recon. Because of the variety between missions and locations, gameplay changes pace. While many missions involve Allied assaults on German targets others include elements of stealth and exploration. For example, one selections of missions has the player detach from an allied raid to infiltrate a German U-boat in order to get to a secret facility while another has them rendezvous and sneak into a German headquarters in disguise to rescue an operative. Many missions are performed solo but also sometimes include an AI companion for backup. Health is determined by a health bar that can be replenished using a selection of "medikits" found throughout levels with varying degrees of effect.

During missions, players can earn medals at the end of each level by meeting requirements such as completions of objectives, eliminating a number of enemies and maintaining a percentage of health throughout, all represented by a bronze, silver or gold star.

== Plot ==
Frontline starts with Lieutenant James Steven "Jimmy" Patterson storming Omaha Beach as a part of Operation Overlord, after which the Office of Strategic Services (OSS) sends him to disrupt German U-boat operations. Patterson stows away aboard the fictional U-Boat U-4902 and infiltrates the German U-boat base in Lorient, France, destroying 4902 and two more U-boats and crippling the port; during his infiltration, he crosses paths with an SS Hauptsturmführer named Rudolf Ulbricht von Sturmgeist conducting an inspection, but Sturmgeist, unaware of Patterson's presence, leaves shortly before the base is destroyed.

Shortly after Patterson completes his mission in Lorient, the OSS discovers that the Germans are building a secret weapon, but their contact in the Dutch Resistance goes missing. Patterson is sent to drop with the 82nd Airborne during Operation Market Garden to find him, meeting up with the Resistance and learning the contact is being held in a Nazi-occupied manor. After infiltrating the manor, Patterson locates the contact and rescues him from German custody.

The OSS learns from the contact that the secret weapon is a highly advanced jet fighter called HO-IX, which has the potential to change the tide of airpower over Europe if it reaches production. Patterson is sent to sabotage the aircraft's production, however en route he is instructed to cross the Nijmegen Bridge, disarm the explosives wired to the bridge, and send supplies to the besieged British 1st Airborne Division trapped in Arnhem. The OSS makes contact with Patterson again, informing him that they have tracked down Sturmgeist, and learned he is the officer in charge of the HO-IX project. Patterson is sent to Emmerich to track Sturmgeist, pursuing him aboard the SS Officer's personal armored train, but Patterson is unable to catch him before he escapes by decoupling the engine.

Patterson abandons the stopped train and proceeds to the secret aircraft facility outside Gotha on foot, destroying vital German supplies in a railroad depot before proceeding to the facility where the secret aircraft is being held. Once there, Patterson sabotages the facility and production lines, broadcasts the location of the facility to the Allies, and confronts Sturmgeist and his guards in the hangar of the HO-IX, killing him and using the HO-IX to escape the facility as it is destroyed by an Allied bombing raid.

== Development ==
After the release of Medal of Honor: Underground in 2000, the series’ original developer, DreamWorks Interactive, was acquired by Electronic Arts and merged into EA Los Angeles in April 2000. Frontline became the first Medal of Honor installment developed by the new EA Los Angeles studio (formerly DreamWorks Interactive) and the first in the series produced entirely in-house at EA, without the involvement of creator Steven Spielberg. Initially a PlayStation 2 exclusive, Electronic Arts confirmed partway through 2002 that the game would be ported to the Xbox and GameCube, marking the franchise’s debut on those platforms.

During development, the team drew direct inspiration from the acclaimed Omaha Beach sequence in Medal of Honor: Allied Assault. The D-Day landing level in Frontline (titled “Your Finest Hour”) was not originally planned, but was added late in production after the Allied Assault mission received an overwhelmingly positive response. Lead designer Chris Cross said he had to perform “story gymnastics” to justify Lt. Patterson’s presence at Omaha Beach and that despite his reservations the team “found a way” to make it fit in the narrative. Implementing the sequence on the PlayStation 2 posed major technical challenges due to the console’s limited memory and processing power. Developers were capped at around 8–12 active AI characters on-screen, so they devised creative methods to simulate a much larger battle. German bunkers, for example, used automated bullet emitters and static mannequin models in place of AI-controlled enemies, while animation and rendering optimizations were employed to create the illusion of a massive invasion force. Despite these hurdles, the Omaha Beach opener became one of Frontline’s signature set pieces and set a more cinematic, large-scale tone that distinguished the game’s design from earlier entries in the series.

== Soundtrack ==
Medal of Honor: Frontline Original Soundtrack Recording

Soundtrack album by Michael Giacchino
- Released: January 1, 2002 (CD); August 30, 2005 (Digital)
- Recorded: June 2001
- Genre: Orchestral
- Length: 79:05
- Label: E.A.R.S

Professional ratings
Review scores
Source	Rating
Game Music Online	10/10

Medal of Honor: Frontline Original Soundtrack Recording is the soundtrack album for the game. The music was composed by Michael Giacchino in early 2001. The score was performed by the Northwest Sinfonia and recorded by Steve Smith at the Bastyr Chapel, between June 11 and 15, 2001.

Different from the score releases of Medal of Honor and Medal of Honor: Underground, the CD album for Frontline was only available through EA Games' online store. A digital release was followed in 2005.

Parts of the soundtrack would also be reused in several later games of the series, such as the Medal of Honor: Allied Assault Expansion Packs Spearhead and Breakthrough, Medal of Honor: Infiltrator, Medal of Honor: Pacific Assault, Medal of Honor: Vanguard and Medal of Honor: Airborne.

=== Track listing ===
All lyrics are written by Scott Langteau; all music is composed by Michael Giacchino.

No.	Title	Length
1.	"Operation Market Garden"	5:32
2.	"Border Town"	3:36
3.	"U-4902"	4:44
4.	"Shipyards Of Lorient"	3:12
5.	"After The Drop" (vocal solo by Anders Marshall)	5:37
6.	"Kleveburg"	3:32
7.	"Manor House Rally"	3:48
8.	"The Halftrack Chase"	3:40
9.	"Nijmegen Bridge"	3:21
10.	"The Rowhouses"	4:40
11.	"Arnhem" (vocal solo by Anders Marshall)	5:51
12.	"Emmerich Station"	3:02
13.	"Thuringer Wald Express"	2:51
14.	"Sturmgeist's Armored Train"	3:54
15.	"Approaching The Tarmac"	3:47
16.	"Clipping Their Wings"	3:27
17.	"Escaping Gotha"	7:17
18.	"The Songless Nightingale" (vocal solo by Anders Marshall)	2:45
19.	"Pub Songs"	4:29
Total length:		79:05

== Reception ==
Reception

Aggregate score
Aggregator	Score		
Aggregator	GameCube	PS2	Xbox
Metacritic	80/100	88/100	81/100

Review scores
Publication	Score		
Publication	GameCube	PS2	Xbox
AllGame	3.5/5	3.5/5	3.5/5
Edge	N/A	5/10	N/A
Electronic Gaming Monthly	7/10	8.33/10	7.67/10
Eurogamer	N/A	10/10	8/10
Game Informer	8.75/10	9/10	8.75/10
GamePro	3.5/5	5/5	4/5
GameRevolution	N/A	B+	N/A
GameSpot	8.4/10	9/10	8.5/10
GameSpy	4/5	4.5/5	4/5
GameZone	8.5/10	9.6/10	9.2/10
IGN	7.9/10	8/10	7.9/10
Nintendo Power	4.3/5	N/A	N/A
Official U.S. PlayStation Magazine	N/A	5/5	N/A
Official Xbox Magazine (US)	N/A	N/A	9/10
The Cincinnati Enquirer	N/A	4.5/5	N/A
Playboy	N/A	90%	N/A

The game received "generally favorable" reviews according to video game review aggregator website Metacritic. GameSpot named Frontline the best video game of May 2002. It won GameSpot's annual "Best Sound on PlayStation 2" award and was a runner-up for "Best Music on PlayStation 2" and "Best Graphics (Technical) on PlayStation 2". It received further nominations in the "Best Shooter", "Best Music" and "Best Sound" categories among GameCube games, and "Best Music" and "Best Sound" among Xbox games.

During the 6th Annual Interactive Achievement Awards, the Academy of Interactive Arts & Sciences awarded Medal of Honor: Frontline with "Outstanding Achievement in Original Music Composition" and "Outstanding Achievement in Sound Design"; it also received a nomination for "Console First-Person Action Game of the Year".

=== Sales ===
By July 2006, the PlayStation 2 version of Medal of Honor: Frontline had sold 2.5 million copies and earned $95 million in the United States alone. Next Generation ranked it as the eighth-highest-selling game launched for the PlayStation 2, Xbox or GameCube between January 2000 and July 2006 in that country. The PlayStation 2 version also received a "Double Platinum" sales award from the Entertainment and Leisure Software Publishers Association (ELSPA), indicating sales of at least 600,000 copies in the United Kingdom; and a "Gold" certification from the Verband der Unterhaltungssoftware Deutschland (VUD), for sales of at least 100,000 units across Germany, Austria and Switzerland.

== High-definition remaster ==
At E3 2010, a high-definition version of Frontline, developed by Danger Close Games, was announced. The remastered version of Frontline was included in the PlayStation 3 version of Medal of Honor (2010) with updated gameplay options, trophy support, and enhanced graphics. Players have the option to play with the classic controls, such as dual stick turning/strafing and dual button weapon switching, or modern based gameplay with iron sights, single-stick looking and strafing, and button press crouching controls. In August 2011, Frontline was released for PlayStation Network.
