= Our Hitch in Hell =

Ballad by Frank Bernard Camp

"Our Hitch in Hell" is a ballad by American poet Frank Bernard Camp, originally published as one of 49 ballads in a 1917 collection entitled American Soldier Ballads, that went on to inspire multiple variants among American law enforcement and military, either as The Final Inspection, the Soldier's Prayer (or Poem), the Policeman's Prayer (or Poem), and variations on those titles.

The final lines of the poem speak of the protagonist being automatically accepted into Heaven due to having already served time in Hell, Hell being their military service:

It's then we'll hear St. Peter
tell us loudly with a yell,
"Take a front seat you soldier men,
you've done your hitch in Hell."

In his 1949 work The Struggle for Guadalcanal, military historian Samuel Eliot Morison transcribed a Marine variant of the poem (possibly authored by James A. Donohue) from the epitaph on the Lunga Point Cemetery grave of Private First Class William Cameron, who had died in that battle:

And when he goes to Heaven,
To St. Peter he will tell:
Another marine reporting, Sir;
I've served my time in hell.

== In popular culture ==
The text of the Anderson epitaph, with "one more soldier" replacing "another marine", appears prior to starting the opening level of the Medal of Honor: Frontline video game.

The ballad has been frequently reproduced without authorship, or under someone else's name, and has inspired adaptations of the poem (such as the "Policeman's Prayer" and "The Final Inspection" (Note: Both Joshua Heltebran and Peter Hornbach claim authorship of "The Final Inspection", and each has separately registered for copyright of the text, Heltebran in 2000 claiming 1996 authorship, and Hornbach in 2005 claiming 2002 authorship.)) by and for members of armed forces and law-enforcement agencies—even by high-risk professions such as miners.
