= Assassins (1995 film) =

1995 film by Richard Donner

- Theatrical release poster
- Directed by: Richard Donner
- Screenplay by: The Wachowskis; Brian Helgeland
- Story by: The Wachowskis
- Produced by: Richard Donner; Joel Silver; Bruce A. Evans; Raynold Gideon; Andrew Lazar; Jim Van Wyck
- Starring: Sylvester Stallone; Antonio Banderas; Julianne Moore
- Cinematography: Vilmos Zsigmond
- Edited by: Richard Marks; Lawrence Jordan
- Music by: Mark Mancina
- Production companies: Silver Pictures; The Donners' Company; Evansgideon/Lazar
- Distributed by: Warner Bros.
- Release date: October 6, 1995
- Running time: 133 minutes
- Country: United States
- Language: English
- Budget: $50 million
- Box office: $83.3 million

Assassins is a 1995 American action thriller film directed and produced by Richard Donner, and starring Sylvester Stallone, Antonio Banderas, and Julianne Moore. The screenplay was written by The Wachowskis (their first produced screenplay) and Brian Helgeland. The film is about a veteran contract killer approaching retirement (Stallone), who finds himself in a feud with a younger, ambitious killer (Banderas), and decides to protect one of his own targets (Moore).

The film was released by Warner Bros. on October 6, 1995. It received negative reviews from critics but was a moderate commercial success, grossing $83.3 million against a $50 million budget. The Wachowskis disowned the final film and tried to take their names off, stating the script was re-written without their input.

== Plot ==
Assassin Robert Rath plans to retire, haunted by the memory of murdering his mentor Nicolai several years ago. While Rath is on an assignment to dispatch tycoon Alan Branch at the memorial service of his brother Samuel, the strategy backfires when Alan is eliminated by Miguel Bain, another assassin. Bain greatly admires Rath, but also intends to kill him and establishes himself as the world's greatest hitman. Bain is arrested, but manages to escape after killing two police officers.

As Rath tries to figure out who sent Bain, his contractor offers him a lucrative job that could allow him to decamp more quickly: kill a notorious computer hacker named Electra, along with four Dutch buyers of a computer disk she possesses, and then retrieve the disk. Electra has set up closed-circuit television cameras and an elaborate mechanism for remotely moving items between rooms in the building where she is based.

At the designated location for the purchase, Bain locates and kills the four Dutchmen, who turn out to be Interpol agents. Realizing Bain is once again after the same target as he is, Rath spares Electra and the two make their getaway with the disk. Frightened by the entire situation, Electra runs away from Rath to her house. Both Bain and Rath track her down separately. During the ensuing fight, Bain kills Electra's neighbors and is about to kill her when Rath intervenes. Realizing Rath does not want to kill her, Electra decides to trust him.

Rath exchanges the disk for his fee, given to him in a briefcase. However, the briefcase contains a bomb planted by his contact. After surviving the attempt on his life, Rath is told by Electra that she swapped the disk, unsure if he would come back. Rath demands a greatly increased fee from his contact for the genuine disk, with the money to be wired to a bank in Puerto Rico. The contact agrees, but also hires Bain to kill Rath.

Rath and Electra travel to the bank, where he concludes that Bain will use an adjacent abandoned hotel as a sniper post. Fifteen years earlier, Rath had shot Nicolai from the same building. Rath sets a trap, managing to both get the money and, with Electra's help, engage Bain in a gunfight. With Bain seemingly dead, Nicolai appears and reveals that he had worn a bulletproof vest when Rath shot him years earlier. Recognizing Nicolai's intention to kill them both, Rath and a surviving Bain both shoot him dead. Despite their brief alliance, Bain draws a gun on Rath, whose back is turned. Electra puts on her sunglasses, allowing Rath to use the reflection to aim a shot backward through his own jacket, killing Bain.

After Bain's death, Rath and Electra leave together. Their true names are Joseph and Anna.

== Cast ==
- Sylvester Stallone as Robert Rath / Joseph
- Antonio Banderas as Miguel Bain
- Julianne Moore as Electra / Anna
- Anatoly Davydov as Nicolai Tashlinkov
- Muse Watson as Ketcham
- Steve Kahan as Alan Branch
- Kai Wulff as Remy
- Mark Coates as Jereme Kyle
- Kelly Rowan as Jennifer
- Reed Diamond as Bob
- Scott Stuber as Parking Attendant
- J. Mills Goodloe as Newlywed

== Production ==
=== Writing ===
The original spec script was written by The Wachowskis and sold for $1 million to producer Joel Silver around the same time he bought their script for The Matrix, also for $1 million. The script was similar to the final film, but with a more developed love story between Rath and Electra and a briefer ending without the character of Nicolai. Silver offered Richard Donner $10 million to direct, but Donner insisted the script be rewritten to tone down the violence and make the central character more sympathetic. Donner brought in Brian Helgeland, who did a page-one rewrite and earned a co-screenwriter credit. The Wachowskis attempted to remove their name from the film but were refused by the Writers Guild of America.

Mel Gibson expressed interest in directing the film, but was replaced by Donner after Braveheart went into production.

=== Filming ===
The film was shot on-location in Seattle, Washington; San Juan, Puerto Rico; and Portland, Oregon.

=== Music ===
Donner originally hired his regular collaborator Michael Kamen to write the film's score. However, he was dissatisfied with his initial work and requested changes. Kamen was no longer available due to his commitments to Die Hard with a Vengeance, so Mark Mancina was brought in on short notice to write a new score. Two of Kamen's cues ( "The Day of the Dead" and "La Muerta") remained in the final film.

== Reception ==
=== Box office ===
Assassins debuted at No. 2 at the box office behind Seven, earning $9.3 million. The film grossed $30.3 million in the United States and another $53 million worldwide.

=== Critical response ===
Audiences polled by CinemaScore gave the film an average grade of "B" on an A+ to F scale. The film received mostly negative reviews from critics. Film-review aggregator Rotten Tomatoes gives the film an 18% positive rating based on 51 reviews, with an average rating of 3.8/10. The script was heavily criticized for being confusing and dull. Stallone's performance in the film earned him a Golden Raspberry Award nomination for Worst Actor (also for Judge Dredd), but the award went to Pauly Shore for Jury Duty.

About the poor critical reception, Richard Donner said:

"I thought Stallone did one of the best jobs he's ever done. He underplayed, he was quiet, he found the character and he went with it. I thought Antonio Banderas was wonderful. The picture came out, and it did not do very well at all. Sure, it hurts and you know why you wish it would do better? The studio gave you a lot of money and you want them to make their money back so that other people can make movies (...) Warners have been good to us and gave us money to make that movie. And I thought we did a good job and they thought we did a good job, but the audiences and critics didn't like it. Did I feel bad? Sure. Did it get me down? Nope, nope, nope – too lucky to be in this business to be down in the dumps."

A sequence in the film featuring Banderas looking away from a laptop screen in joy retrospectively became a popular reaction meme GIF.
