= Medal of Honor: Rising Sun =

2003 video game

- Developer: EA Los Angeles
- Publisher: EA Games
- Composer: Christopher Lennertz
- Series: Medal of Honor
- Engine: Unreal Engine
- Platforms: GameCube; PlayStation 2; Xbox
- Release: NA: November 11, 2003; AU: November 25, 2003; EU: November 28, 2003; AU: December 2, 2003 (GC)
- Genre: First-person shooter
- Modes: Single-player, multiplayer

Medal of Honor: Rising Sun is a first-person shooter video game and the fifth installment of the Medal of Honor video game series, released by EA Games in November 2003 for PlayStation 2, GameCube and Xbox. It is set in World War II, during the Pacific War. It features single-player and multiplayer modes, with multiplayer terminated as of 2007. In the single-player mode, the player assumes the role of Joseph Griffin of the United States Marine Corps.

== Gameplay ==
Medal of Honor: Rising Sun is a first-person shooter. It has two multiplayer modes, Deathmatch: a free-for-all match, and Team Deathmatch, in which the player can choose teams. The online multiplayer was one of the more successful elements of the game, coming at a time when online play titles for the PlayStation 2 were not widely available. The online mode attracted and retained a loyal playerbase until its closure in January 2007. The game also has a two-player campaign that follows the same plot (except the omission of Supercarrier Sabotage) and allows either player to respawn if the other is still alive. This, however, lacks many things the main campaign has, including the entrenching tool, the machete and most of your squadmates. Offline multiplayer is also available, where up to four people can play against each other and optionally AI bots.

== Plot ==
On December 7, 1941, U.S. Marine Corporal Joseph D. 'Joe' Griffin awakens on the USS California to the attack on Pearl Harbor. He makes his way topside, putting out fires and aiding crewmen along the way, and meets up with Gunnery Sergeant Jack 'Gunny' Lauton, his commander. Joe works to shoot down planes and destroy torpedoes. He is blown off the ship, but is rescued by a PT boat carrying Gunny, Private First Class Frank Spinelli and Private First Class Silas Whitfield. Joe gets in the turret and shoots down planes to defend Battleship Row. After witnessing the sinking of the USS Arizona, they defend the USS Nevada as it attempts to escape harbor.

On January 1, 1942, Joe and Gunny are stationed in the Philippines, where they meet up with Joe's younger brother, Donnie, who is in a Marine demolition unit. Donnie and the demolition engineers need to blow Calumpit Bridge, but their demolition truck got captured. The three successfully get the truck back, and the bridge is blown, but Donnie is still inside a tank when it is overrun by Japanese soldiers, and is presumed dead. On August 7, 1942, Gunny, Joe and two other Marines are part of a midnight raid on Guadalcanal to take an airfield and destroy an ammo dump before the main assault at dawn. On October 14, 1942, however, the Japanese are hammering them with artillery from their position codenamed 'Pistol Pete'. Because of this, Gunny gives Joe two Marines and the mission to take out Pistol Pete. The mission is successful, and, along the way, they meet up with Martin Clemens, a Scottish guerrilla fighter and coastwatcher, 2 natives called Selas and Kiep and they rescue POW Lieutenant Edmund Harrison, a demolitions expert who blows up the guns for them. The mission is successful, and Joe is recommended by Gunny to the Office of Strategic Services and promoted Sergeant.

In March 1943, Joe is sent to Japanese-occupied Singapore to infiltrate a top secret Axis summit led by Japanese Commander Shima. He meets up with Private First Class Ichiro 'Harry' Tanaka, a Japanese-American OSS operative, and Major Philip Bromley, a British SOE operative. Joe manages to steal German Colonel Kandler's uniform, and infiltrate the summit, where Japanese Commander Masataka Shima reveals the discovery of large quantities of gold in Burma; and introduces General Sergei Borov, a Russian traitor of the Allies who plans to overthrow Stalin to forge peace between Nazi Germany and the Soviet Union. Joe's cover is blown when Kandler bursts in, but Bromley arrives, and the two fight their way out of the hotel, and Tanaka picks them up in a double decker bus.

On April 26, 1944, the three are sent on a mission to investigate Japanese gold smelting operations in temples in Burma. While there, Raj, their Flying Tigers pilot, is shot down, and they set to work getting him back. Bromley and his men destroy four AA guns so a proper air strike can be done, and Tanaka and Joe infiltrate the temples, and rescue Raj. The air strike destroys the gold smelting operation, and the mission is successful. On July 17, 1944, Joe falls out their plane while in Thailand while they are investigating a train with Shima's gold in it. He meets up with Bromley, and they blow up a train full of Shima's gold, but more of it is aboard Shima's supercarrier, so they fly there, and arrive the next day.

Bromley and Joe fight their way below deck, sabotaging the ventilation system and fuel tanks and planting explosive charges to sink the ship, while Tanaka infiltrates the officer's quarters to find Shima. Joe and Bromley are gassed and captured after much fighting, and Shima interrogates them. Tanaka manages to free Joe, but is personally killed by Shima. Joe fights his way through more of the ship, and witnesses Shima escaping with Donnie in a plane. Eventually, Joe and Bromley meet on deck, and steal a plane. After several failed takeoffs and shooting down many enemy planes, they get off the ship moments before their charges detonate and cause the carrier to sink. Bromley mourns Tanaka's death, but promises Joe that they will locate Shima and rescue Donnie.

The ending to Medal of Honor: Heroes revealed that Joseph was planning POW rescue raids, signifying that Joseph was eventually able to rescue Donnie later in the war.

== Development ==
The game had a marketing budget of $6.3 million.

== Reception ==
Reception

Aggregate score
Aggregator	Score		
Aggregator	GameCube	PS2	Xbox
Metacritic	68/100	68/100	65/100

Review scores
Publication	Score		
Publication	GameCube	PS2	Xbox
Edge	5/10	5/10	5/10
Eurogamer	N/A	4/10	N/A
Game Informer	7.5/10	7.75/10	7.75/10
GameRevolution	C	C	C
GameSpot	6.4/10	6.4/10	6.4/10
GameSpy	2/5	2/5	2/5
IGN	7.5/10	8/10	7.5/10
Nintendo Power	3.8/5	N/A	N/A
Official U.S. PlayStation Magazine	N/A	3.5/5	N/A
Official Xbox Magazine (US)	N/A	N/A	8.8/10

The PlayStation 2 version of Medal of Honor: Rising Sun received a "Double Platinum" sales award from the Entertainment and Leisure Software Publishers Association (ELSPA), indicating sales of at least 600,000 copies in the United Kingdom; and a "Gold" certification from the Verband der Unterhaltungssoftware Deutschland (VUD), for sales of at least 100,000 units across Germany, Switzerland and Austria.

The game received "mixed or average" reviews according to video game review aggregator website Metacritic. Critics agreed that the opening Pearl Harbor missions was a great introduction to the game, however the later missions afterwards were considered sub-par in comparison, leading to question whether the game was released unfinished.

Rising Sun did receive an award for "Outstanding Achievement in Original Music Composition" during the AIAS' 7th Annual Interactive Achievement Awards.

== Cancelled sequel ==
A sequel was originally planned in which players would have assumed the role of Joseph's brother Donnie. However, it was canceled after Rising Sun received mixed reviews.
