= Medal of Honor: Infiltrator =

2003 video game

- Developer: Netherock Ltd.
- Publisher: EA Games
- Composer: Allister Brimble
- Series: Medal of Honor
- Platform: Game Boy Advance
- Release: NA: November 18, 2003; EU: December 12, 2003
- Genre: Third-person shooter
- Modes: Single-player, multiplayer

Medal of Honor: Infiltrator is a top-down third-person shooter game and the sixth installment in the Medal of Honor video game series, and the second game for the Game Boy Advance. The game was developed by Netherock Ltd. and published by EA Games in North America in November 2003, and in Europe and Japan in December 2003.

== Gameplay ==
In the game, the player takes the role of Corporal Jake Murphy, completing five missions to defeat the Axis in some of most famous battles in World War II. The game features 15 missions spread across three theaters including 5 missions behind enemy lines. Infiltrator is technically both a third-person shooter with a fixed view and a first-person shooter blended together. Through the use of a link cable, Infiltrator supports up to two players. It also features a Nintendo GameCube connectivity option, which connects both the game and the GameCube version of Medal of Honor: Rising Sun using the GameCube - Game Boy Advance Link Cable allowing the Game Boy Advance to be used as an in-game map. Upon completing all of the missions, the player unlocks Survival Mode, where the objective is to see how long the player can survive and then try to beat their high score. Completing the game with bonus objectives fulfilled unlocks "Max GI Mode" where the player must complete every mission continuously without turning off the game system.

== Reception ==
Reception

Aggregate score
Aggregator	Score
Metacritic	80/100

Review scores
Publication	Score
Eurogamer	7/10
Game Informer	6/10
GamePro	4/5
GameSpot	8.4/10
GameSpy	3/5
GamesTM	70%
GameZone	9/10
IGN	8.8/10
Nintendo Power	3.9/5

The game received "favorable" reviews according to video game review aggregator website Metacritic. IGN's Craig Harris noted that "the final product is a game well on the other end of the quality spectrum from last year's dud" and "has a great feel all the way through." Frank Provo of GameSpot stated that Infiltrator "is a fun handheld game that should please anyone who's looking for an action game with teeth."
