= Medal of Honor (video game series) =

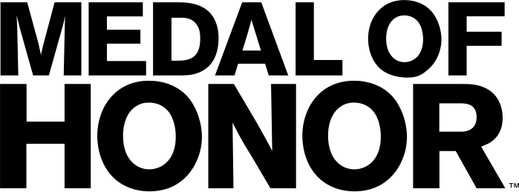
- Logo used from 2010–2019
- Genre: First-person shooter
- Developers: 2015; Budcat Creations; Danger Close Games; EA Canada; EA Digital Illusions CE; Netherock Limited; Rebellion Developments; Team Fusion; TKO Software; Respawn Entertainment
- Publisher: Electronic Arts
- Creator: Steven Spielberg
- Platforms: Game Boy Advance; Mac OS X; Windows; GameCube; PlayStation; PlayStation 2; PlayStation 3; PlayStation Portable; Wii; Xbox; Xbox 360
- First release: Medal of Honor; November 10, 1999
- Latest release: Medal of Honor: Above and Beyond; December 11, 2020

Medal of Honor is a series of first-person shooter video games created by American film director and producer Steven Spielberg. The first game, Medal of Honor, was developed by DreamWorks Interactive and published by Electronic Arts for the PlayStation in 1999. It spawned a series of follow-up games including multiple expansions spanning various console platforms and PCs.

The first twelve installments take place during World War II, as does the fifteenth. The main characters are usually elite members of the Office of Strategic Services (OSS), while some of the later games focus on modern warfare. The concept, story, and executive production of the first three games were overseen by Spielberg, who later sold the franchise to Electronic Arts in February 2000. The music in the franchise was composed by Michael Giacchino, Christopher Lennertz and Ramin Djawadi.

== Development history ==
The series began in 1999 with Medal of Honor. The game was developed by DreamWorks Interactive, when at the time the studio and series were jointly owned by DreamWorks SKG and Microsoft Games, with the game concept and story created by filmmaker Steven Spielberg. The game was released for the PlayStation on October 31, 1999. Spielberg's inspiration for the series emerged while directing and producing the World War II film Saving Private Ryan to create a game that can concurrently be an educational and entertaining experience.

In 2000, Medal of Honor: Underground, the sequel, was released for the PlayStation and Game Boy Advance. Medal of Honor: Allied Assault, the third game, was developed by 2015 and released for the PC, Mac OS X and Linux in January 2002. Allied Assault has expansion packs titled Spearhead (2002) and Breakthrough (2003). Fourth entry Medal of Honor: Frontline was developed and released for the PlayStation 2 in May 2002 and the GameCube and Xbox in November 2002. It was later remastered in high-definition and released in 2010 with the PlayStation 3 version of Medal of Honor (2010), the first game in the rebooted series. Medal of Honor: Rising Sun, the fifth game, was released for PlayStation 2, Xbox and GameCube in 2003 (a planned sequel was cancelled due to the game's mixed reviews). The sixth game, Medal of Honor: Infiltrator, was released for the Game Boy Advance in 2003. Medal of Honor: Pacific Assault, the seventh entry, was released for the PC, Mac OS X and Linux in 2004. It was followed by Medal of Honor: European Assault, the eighth game, which was released for PlayStation 2, Xbox and GameCube in 2005. Medal of Honor: Heroes, a spin-off and the ninth game in the series, was developed and released for the PlayStation Portable in 2006. Medal of Honor: Vanguard, the tenth entry, was released for the PlayStation 2 and Wii in 2007. It was the first Medal of Honor game to be released on the Wii console. Medal of Honor: Airborne, the eleventh game in the series, was developed and released for the PlayStation 3, Xbox 360 and PC September 4, 2007; it was the first game in the series to be nonlinear. Twelfth entry Medal of Honor: Heroes 2 was released for the Wii and PlayStation Portable on November 13, 2007. It was a sequel of the first game in spin-off Heroes series.

The thirteenth game in the series, Medal of Honor (2010), was announced in 2008 as Medal of Honor: Operation Anaconda. The game was developed by Danger Close Games, a video game development team formerly known as EA Los Angeles merged in 2008. Medal of Honor (2010) was released for the PlayStation 3, Xbox 360 and PC on October 12, 2010. Its multiplayer component was developed by the creators of the Battlefield franchise. It is the first Medal of Honor game to be set in the modern day rather than during World War II. Medal of Honor received generally positive reviews from critics and was a commercial success. Medal of Honor: Warfighter, the fourteenth installment in the series and the direct sequel to the 2010 game, was released for the PlayStation 3, Xbox 360 and PC on October 23, 2012. The game's storyline was written by real U.S. Tier 1 Operators, inspired by actual events. It is the first game in the series to run on EA Digital Illusions CE's Frostbite 2 game engine. Warfighter was both a critical and commercial failure. In January 2013, COO Peter Moore of Electronic Arts announced that the Medal of Honor series was taken out of rotation due to the poor reception and sales of Medal of Honor: Warfighter. On September 25, 2019, Respawn Entertainment announced Medal of Honor: Above and Beyond for Oculus VR titled at the Oculus Connect 6 conference.

Medal of Honor logos
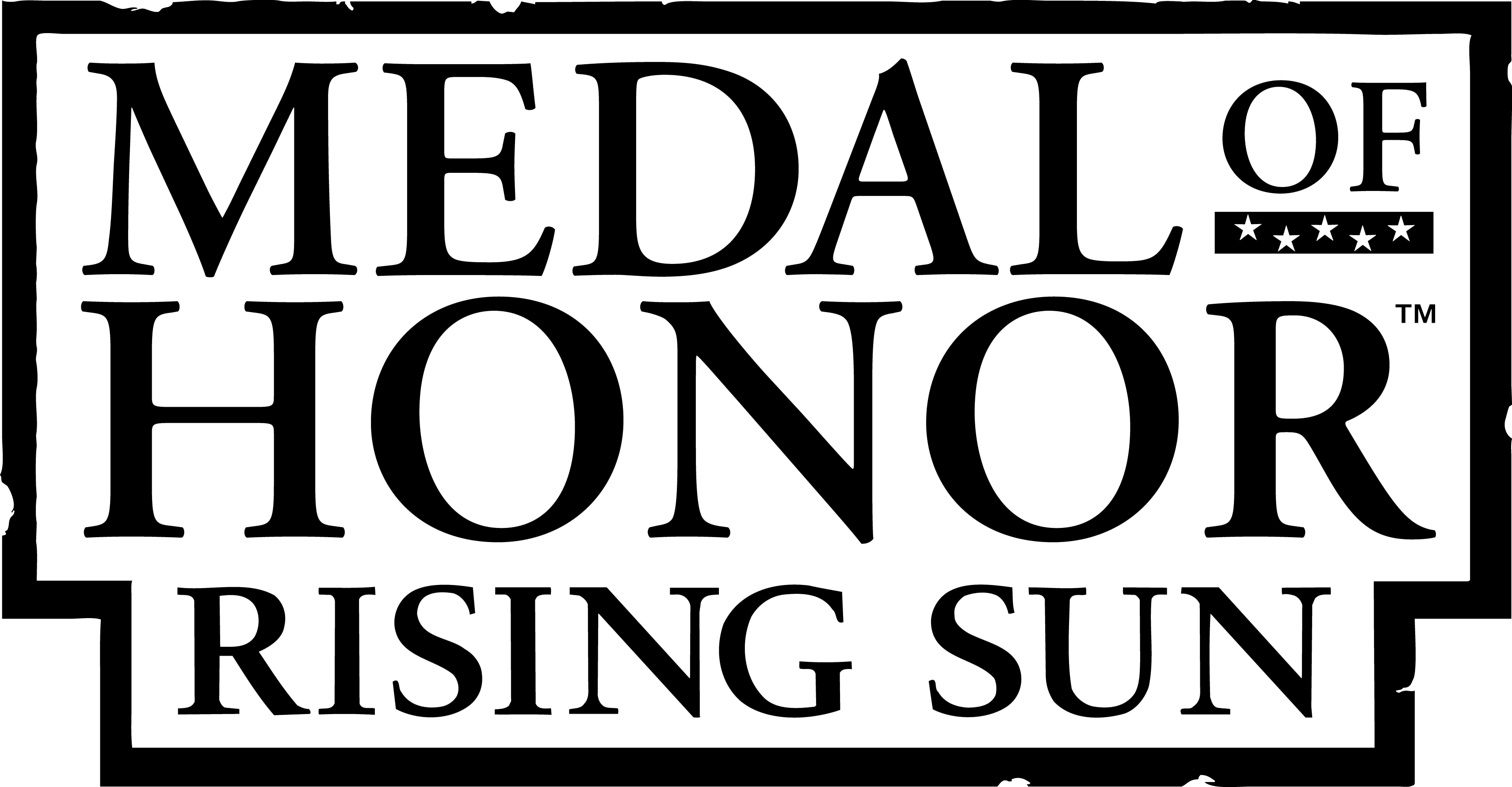
A variation of the Medal of Honor logo, used from 1999–2003

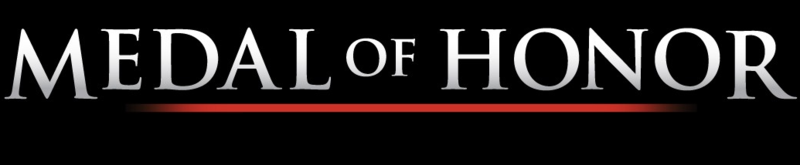
Logo used from 2004–2009

== Games ==
Titles in the Medal of Honor series
Year	Title	Developer(s)	Platform(s)			
Year	Title	Developer(s)	Sony	Microsoft	Nintendo	Other
1999	Medal of Honor	DreamWorks Interactive	PS	—N/a	—N/a	—N/a
2000	Medal of Honor: Underground	DreamWorks Interactive, Rebellion Developments	PS	—N/a	GBA	—N/a
2002	Medal of Honor: Allied Assault	2015	—N/a	Windows	—N/a	Mac OS X, Linux
2002	Medal of Honor: Frontline	EA Los Angeles	PS2, PS3^{1}	Xbox	GameCube	—N/a
2002	Medal of Honor: Allied Assault Spearhead^{2}	EA Los Angeles	—N/a	Windows	—N/a	Mac OS X, Linux
2003	Medal of Honor: Allied Assault Breakthrough^{2}	TKO Software	—N/a	Windows	—N/a	Mac OS X, Linux
2003	Medal of Honor: Rising Sun	EA Los Angeles	PS2	Xbox	GameCube	—N/a
2003	Medal of Honor: Infiltrator	Netherock Limited	—N/a	—N/a	GBA	—N/a
2004	Medal of Honor: Pacific Assault	EA Los Angeles	—N/a	Windows	—N/a	—N/a
2005	Medal of Honor: European Assault	EA Los Angeles	PS2	Xbox	GameCube	—N/a
2006	Medal of Honor: Heroes	Team Fusion	PSP	—N/a	—N/a	—N/a
2007	Medal of Honor: Vanguard	EA Los Angeles, Budcat Creations	PS2	—N/a	Wii	—N/a
2007	Medal of Honor: Airborne	EA Los Angeles	PS3	Windows, Xbox 360	—N/a	—N/a
2007	Medal of Honor: Heroes 2	EA Los Angeles, EA Canada	PSP	—N/a	Wii	—N/a
2010	Medal of Honor	Danger Close Games, EA Digital Illusions CE	PS3	Windows, Xbox 360	—N/a	—N/a
2012	Medal of Honor: Warfighter	Danger Close Games	PS3	Windows, Xbox 360	—N/a	—N/a
2020	Medal of Honor: Above and Beyond	Respawn Entertainment	—N/a	Windows	—N/a	Oculus VR
Notes: 1. The PS3 version of Medal of Honor: Frontline is remastered in HD.; 2. Expansion pack for Medal of Honor: Allied Assault

== Gameplay ==
The gameplay originally focuses on the Office of Strategic Services (OSS), an American espionage organization during World War II, placing emphasis on using false papers and silenced pistols, but as the series and the technology has progressed, it has shifted emphasis towards front-line combat. Since the release of Medal of Honor: Rising Sun the series has focused on providing a more open-ended element to the games, allowing the player to have more options in each level instead of a linear path. The violence, up to Medal of Honor: Rising Sun is bloodless and simple, usually consisting of elaborate animations, while the violence in Medal of Honor: Pacific Assault and onward contains the occasional sprays of blood.

== Compilations ==
- Medal of Honor: Allied Assault Deluxe Edition, released on 2003 for Windows and Macintosh includes the Medal of Honor: Allied Assault main game, the Medal of Honor: Allied Assault Spearhead expansion pack, two strategy guides, a music CD soundtrack from Medal of Honor: Allied Assault and a preview of Medal of Honor: Pacific Assault.
- Medal of Honor Allied Assault: War Chest, released on 2004 for Windows and Macintosh includes the Medal of Honor: Allied Assault main game and the Medal of Honor: Allied Assault Spearhead and Medal of Honor: Allied Assault Breakthrough expansion packs.
- Medal of Honor Collection, released on March 6, 2007, for the PlayStation 2, is a set of three games: Medal of Honor: Frontline, Medal of Honor: Rising Sun and Medal of Honor: European Assault.
- Medal of Honor 10th Anniversary Bundle, released on September 22, 2008, for PC, consists of Medal of Honor: Allied Assault, with its respective expansion packs Spearhead and Breakthrough, Medal of Honor: Pacific Assault Director's Edition, and Medal of Honor: Airborne. The pack includes the 10th Anniversary Medal of Honor Soundtrack, by Michael Giacchino.

== Reception ==
Aggregate review scores As of April 17, 2021.
Game	Metacritic
Medal of Honor (1999)	(PS) 92
Medal of Honor: Underground	(PS) 86 (GBA) 46
Medal of Honor: Allied Assault	(PC) 91
Medal of Honor: Frontline	(PS2) 88 (Xbox) 81 (GC) 80
Medal of Honor: Rising Sun	(GC) 68 (PS2) 68 (Xbox) 65
Medal of Honor: Infiltrator	(GBA) 80
Medal of Honor: Pacific Assault	(PC) 80
Medal of Honor: European Assault	(PS2) 73 (Xbox) 72 (GC) 71
Medal of Honor: Heroes	(PSP) 71
Medal of Honor: Vanguard	(PS2) 63 (Wii) 56
Medal of Honor: Airborne	(PC) 78 (PS3) 75 (X360) 73
Medal of Honor: Heroes 2	(Wii) 73 (PSP) 69
Medal of Honor (2010)	(PS3) 75 (X360) 74 (PC) 72
Medal of Honor: Warfighter	(PC) 55 (PS3) 55 (X360) 53
Medal of Honor: Above and Beyond	(PC) 67

The games have received overall positive reviews, with the most acclaimed title in the series being the 1999 Medal of Honor. As of 2016, the series sold over 39 million copies, making it one of the best-selling video game franchises of all time.

== Awards ==
Guinness World Records awarded the Medal of Honor series with a world record for Best-selling FPS franchise in the Guinness World Records: Gamer's Edition 2008.

Colette, a short documentary included in the gallery mode for Medal of Honor: Above and Beyond, won the Academy Award for Best Documentary Short Subject at the 93rd Academy Awards. Though not mentioned by name in the Academy citation, Medal of Honor is arguably the first video game series ever to receive an Oscar for its content.
