= Medal of Honor: Heroes 2 =

2007 video game

- Developers: EA Los Angeles (PSP); EA Canada (Wii)
- Publisher: Electronic Arts
- Series: Medal of Honor
- Engine: EAGL
- Platforms: PlayStation Portable; Wii
- Release: NA: November 13, 2007; AU: November 29, 2007 (PSP); EU: November 30, 2007 (PSP); AU: February 7, 2008 (Wii); EU: February 8, 2008 (Wii)
- Genre: First-person shooter
- Modes: Single-player, multiplayer (Note: Multiplayer is not available for the Australian and Japanese releases of the Wii version due to such version being online only and online multiplayer being unsupported for these countries; multiplayer disabled in all other releases of the Wii version on August 11, 2011 due to server shutdown.)

Medal of Honor: Heroes 2 is a 2007 first-person shooter video game for the Wii and the PlayStation Portable. It is the 12th installment in the long-running Medal of Honor series of World War II games, and a direct sequel to the PSP-exclusive Medal of Honor: Heroes, released a year prior. Each version was built from the ground up for its respective system. Medal of Honor: Heroes 2 is set in World War II, starting on the Normandy beaches trying to control German bunkers and then move on to secure a village in France.

This is the second Medal of Honor game to be released for the Wii (the first being Medal of Honor: Vanguard), and the latest game in the series to be available on a Nintendo system.

== Plot ==
The player takes the role of Office of Strategic Services operative Lieutenant John Berg. The game has eight missions (seven in the PSP version) and is set against the backdrop of the Battle of Cherbourg.

Lt. Berg is deployed to Northern France in the midst of the Normandy D-Day amphibious invasion to conduct investigations into the German special weapon programs situated in the area. There, he discovers a terrifying weapon that could potentially shift the war in Germany's favor, and endeavors to thwart Hitler's plans to produce that weapon.

== Gameplay ==
In addition to featuring a single-player campaign mode and an arcade-style rail shooter mode, both versions of the game have extensive multiplayer modes. Both versions can support up to 32 players online on a single server, with six maps and six uniforms, three for Axis and three for Allies. The uniforms for the Allies are "Ranger's 2nd", "Ranger's 4th", and "Ranger's 5th", whereas the Axis uniforms are simply "Axis Rookie", "Axis Regular", and "Axis Elite". There are three different online multiplayer modes available: free-for-all deathmatch, team deathmatch and Infiltration. While the Wii version's multiplayer is online-only, with no offline split-screen multiplayer modes, the PSP version supports local wireless multiplayer among up to 8 players.

In free-for-all deathmatch, players compete to kill as many other players as possible, earning one point for each opponent they kill and losing one point every time they are killed. Team deathmatch divides players into two larger teams, either the Axis or Allies, and players earn points for killing enemy players, while losing points for friendly fire kills or suicides. Infiltration is a capture the flag mode between these same two teams, which compete to hold majority control over a contested flag. An online leaderboard system was powered by EA Nation to recognize skilled players who have scored many kills while suffering fewer deaths.

There are over a dozen Allied and Axis weapons available to use throughout the game, although the multiplayer mode applies small, but significant changes to the behavior of certain weapons, such as nerfing the Stg 44's rate of fire and allowing players to fire bazookas in a non-stationary position.

== Development ==
=== Multiplayer support limitations ===
Online multiplayer is unavailable altogether for both the Australian and Japanese releases of both versions of this game. The Australian version's lack of online multiplayer was widely criticized. EA Australia & EB Games Australia also removed all references to online multiplayer from their websites.

EA's official response to the lack of multiplayer for Australia was: "Medal of Honor Heroes 2 for Wii does not support online functionality in Australia. We made an error in the documentation and marketing materials. We are very sorry to have caused confusion for our customers. We will provide a refund to anyone in Australia who wishes to return the game to EA because of the lack of online functionality." EA Australia has declined to comment on why the online element of the game was omitted from the game, which has led video game news websites to speculate that the company did not deem it profitable to host the local servers necessary for low-latency game play.

Online multiplayer service for the Heroes duology was terminated on August 11, 2011, a few years ahead of the shutdown of Nintendo Wi-Fi Connection for the Wii and DS.

== Reception ==
Reception

Aggregate score
Aggregator	Score	
Aggregator	PSP	Wii
Metacritic	69/100	73/100

Review scores
Publication	Score	
Publication	PSP	Wii
Eurogamer	N/A	5/10
Game Informer	N/A	6.75/10
GamePro	2/5	3.5/5
GameRevolution	N/A	C
GameSpot	7/10	8/10
GameSpy	3.5/5	3.5/5
GameZone	8/10	8.3/10
IGN	8.4/10	8.4/10
Nintendo Power	N/A	8/10
PlayStation Official Magazine – UK	7/10	N/A
411Mania	N/A	8.6/10

Medal of Honor: Heroes 2 received "average" reviews on both platforms according to video game review aggregator website Metacritic.

== See also ==
- The Conduit, a similarly praised Wii first-person shooter with online-only multiplayer
