= Medal of Honor: Warfighter =

2012 video game

- Developer: Danger Close Games
- Publisher: Electronic Arts
- Producer: Greg Goodrich
- Designer: Electronic Arts
- Writers: Michael McCarthy; Adrian Vershinin
- Composer: Ramin Djawadi
- Series: Medal of Honor
- Engine: Frostbite 2
- Platforms: Microsoft Windows; PlayStation 3 Xbox 360
- Release: NA: October 23, 2012; AU: October 25, 2012; EU: October 26, 2012
- Genre: First-person shooter
- Modes: Single-player; multiplayer

Medal of Honor: Warfighter is a first-person shooter game developed by Danger Close Games and published by Electronic Arts. It is a sequel to Medal of Honor (2010) and is the fourteenth installment in the Medal of Honor video game series. The game's single-player campaign picks up where the previous entry left off, as it follows the Navy SEALs from the previous game's AFO Neptune.

Development of the sequel began after the 2010 reboot was commercially successful. During development, Naval Special Warfare Development Group (DEVGRU) members who worked as consultants for the game were disciplined for releasing classified information. The title was announced on February 23, 2012, and was released in October 2012 on Microsoft Windows, PlayStation 3, and Xbox 360.

Upon release, Warfighter received mixed reviews, with praise for the visuals and the use of Frostbite 2, but criticism aimed at the low texture quality on consoles, glitches, confusing storyline and poor artificial intelligence. The game sold 3 million copies by January 2013, but was deemed a commercial failure for EA, resulting in the Medal of Honor series being placed on hiatus. The next game in the series, Medal of Honor: Above and Beyond, would release in 2020.

== Gameplay ==
The gameplay in Warfighter features different aspects than its predecessor. Features from the previous game such as peek and lean, requesting ammunition (now unlimited), and sliding returned. New features in the campaign like the Dynamic Door Breach and environmental destruction have been added.

=== Single-player ===
The single-player campaign follows the story of Tier 1 operators from US Special Operations Forces and features various locations including Bosnia, Pakistan, the Philippines, and Somalia. The player primarily plays as "Preacher" of Task Force Blackbird and "Stump" of Task Force Mako. Campaign levels follow a nonlinear path and depict missions which occur at various points in time.

=== Multiplayer ===
Medal of Honor: Warfighter's multiplayer was not developed by EA Digital Illusions CE who previously helped develop Medal of Honor's multiplayer. Danger Close Games developed the game's multiplayer aspect with DICE's Frostbite 2 engine. Players are involved in a global battle and choose which country they would like to support. There are 12 different tier one units from ten different nations that players can choose from. Reserving the game gave players access to additional content when Warfighter released, including additional weapons and perks. There was also a limited edition of the game that gave players early access to the U.S. SEAL Sniper equipped with the McMilllan TAC-300.

The following national task-forces are available in multiplayer:

- (Australia) Australian Special Air Service Regiment (SASR)
- (United Kingdom) British Special Air Service (SAS)
- (Canada) Canadian Joint Task Force 2 (JTF-2)
- (Germany) German Kommando Spezialkräfte (KSK)
- (Norway) Norwegian Forsvarets Spesialkommando (FSK/HJK)
- (Poland) Polish JW GROM (GROM)
- (Russia) Russian FSB Alpha (Alfa Group)
- (South Korea) Republic of Korea Navy Special Warfare Flotilla (UDT/SEAL)
- (Sweden) Swedish Särskilda operationsgruppen (SOG)
- (United States) U.S. Army Delta Force (SFOD-D)
- (United States) U.S. Navy SEAL Team Six (DEVGRU)
- (United States) U.S. CIA Special Activities Center/Special Operations Group (SAC/SOG) also referred to as "OGA" (Other Government Agency)

Within these groups, there are six distinct classes that players select from: Spec Ops, Sniper, Assaulter, Demolitions, Heavy Gunner, and Point Man. Each class has specific benefits and unique abilities. These nationalities and classes are only available in multiplayer mode.

The game's online servers along with Medal of Honor: Airborne and Medal of Honor (2010) were shut down on February 22, 2023.

=== Customization ===
Warfighter's multiplayer features deep customization, for both the player's appearance and their weapons. The player is able to equip each weapon with various barrels, muzzles, magazines, stocks, optics, and paint jobs.

== Plot ==
At a ship dock in Karachi, Pakistan, Task Force Mako plants a demolition charge to sabotage a terrorist organization's smuggling operation. However, the charge unexpectedly sets off secondary explosions which destroy the docks. Debrief by their "OGA" (Other Government Agency) handler Dusty, a former U.S. Army Delta Force operator, suggests that their charge set off hidden PETN explosives being smuggled in the shipping containers to the Philippines.

Mako follows the lead to Isabela City, Philippines, but are diverted to aid the Philippine SOCOM's Task Force Tiger, led by General Barrera, with rescuing several hostages kidnapped by the Abu Sayyaf Group. They identify one of the hostage takers as Marwan al-Khalifa but General Barrera denies Mako's recommendations and instead orders his own NAVSOG operator, "Tiger 12", to shoot Khalifa. Tiger 12 wounds Khalifa and, in the chaos, the kidnappers and an unidentified terrorist are able to escape with the hostages. Mother and Preacher link up with the NAVSOG team and push in to secure the hostages. After taking multiple casualties due to General Barrera's poor decisions, Tiger 12 directs the NAVSOG team to ignore Barrera and follow Mother's orders. The NAVSOG and DEVGRU operators are able to secure the hostages, though Tiger 12 is seriously wounded and Khalifa and the unknown terrorist escape. Humiliated, General Barrera uses his political connections to force Mother and Preacher to retire from the Navy.

Weeks later, Task Force Mako, now led by Voodoo and consisting of Stump, Dingo, and Tick, assists a Marine-led amphibious raid aimed at curtailing local Somali piracy and later returns to the USS Bainbridge to help aid with the hostage situation on a U.S. freighter off the Somali coast.

Preacher takes his discharge and travels to Madrid, Spain to repair his failing marriage. While waiting for his wife's train to arrive, he unexpectedly sees Khalifa but is unable to stop him from committing a suicide bombing in the station. When Preacher regains consciousness in the hospital, he finds Lena and their daughter are safe as they missed their train. Mother visits and tells him that intel from their missions revealed connections between the Madrid train bombing (which used smuggled PETN), Abu Sayyaf, the unknown terrorist (now identified as Sa'ad al Din), and a terrorist leader known only as "the Cleric". Mother persuades him to join a newly-formed covert unit codenamed Task Force Blackbird, a joint effort between the Navy and the Central Intelligence Agency to investigate the PETN proliferation.

Task Force Blackbird, composed of Mother, Preacher, and Ajab, a local Pakistani CIA asset, track a gun runner named Faraz who is linked to the PETN smuggling. The operation is kept secret from Pakistani officials as Blackbird suspects they are actually aiding the terrorist network. This appears to be confirmed as Blackbird is forced to engage Pakistani Inter-Services Intelligence (ISI) agents protecting Faraz. Mother and Preacher apprehend their target and learn the PETN is being supplied by a banker in Dubai named Hassan. While waiting for extraction, Faraz is killed by an enemy sniper and Ajab barely helps the two escape. While this is happening, Mako has tracked the PETN to Yemen and raids the terrorist facility storing it. There, they find a training camp with mockups of airports and train stations but only half of the PETN stockpile.

Blackbird arrives in Dubai and capture Hassan for interrogation. The SEALs manage to upload crucial data from Hassan's laptop but are captured before they can escape with Hassan. This data leads Mako to Sarajevo, where a Bosnian weapons dealer named Stovan Bosic is selling the PETN. Mako links up with a team of Polish GROM, and the joint forces track Bosic to the abandoned bobsled/luge track from the 1984 Winter Olympics where they capture him. Bosic reveals that two ships containing the PETN had just left Dubai. Dusty notifies NATO forces in Croatia to impound one of the vessels while Mako is sent to intercept the other headed for Karachi.

Unbeknownst to them, Sa'ad al Din is interrogating Preacher and Mother aboard that very same cargo freighter. After refusing to divulge information, Mother is executed by Sa'ad al Din. As Mako arrives and assaults the ship, Preacher is able to escape and fight his way to the bridge. He corners and overpowers Sa'ad al-Din before Mako arrives and takes the latter into custody. This enables them to identify the Cleric's identity as Hassan and his compound in Pakistan.

Preacher and Dusty join Mako in the final raid on Hassan's compound. During the assault, Voodoo and Preacher locate Hassan and kill him when he attempts to detonate his suicide vest. Afterward, they return home and pay their respects to Mother at his funeral. Some time after the funeral, Preacher receives a deployment signal on his pager while spending time with his family, but hesitates to answer.

== Development ==
One month after Medal of Honor was released, John Riccitiello, EA CEO at the time, stated that "Consumer feedback has been strong to suggest that we've got a franchise now, once again, that we could successfully and effectively sequel in the future." On February 18, 2011, Gregory Goodrich, the executive producer of Danger Close Games, said that the company would be pursuing a sequel to the 2010 reboot. On January 11, 2012, retailer Game revealed that EA plans to release new entries in the Medal of Honor and Need for Speed series later that year, which was shown by EA during a confidential presentation. Several video game website outlets such as GameSpot and Kotaku disclosed an invitation to a March 6, 2012, public unveiling at the Game Developers Conference in San Francisco, indicating that a new installment in the Medal of Honor franchise would have its first public demonstration.

Warfighter follows in the footsteps of 2011's Battlefield 3 by using the Frostbite 2 engine. EA senior creative director Richard Farrelly said Danger Close has been helping push the engine in new directions and has managed to create its own signature look for Warfighter, but "still have some of the same elements that EA Digital Illusions CE have like the micro-destruction and the amazing lighting." Farrelly also stated that Warfighter is "helping make Frostbite 2 a better engine".

=== Beta ===
A multiplayer beta for Warfighter was made available on October 5 exclusively for the Xbox 360. The beta featured one map, and one mode. Players had access to all 6 classes. The beta ended on October 15.

=== Controversy ===
Seven members of Naval Special Warfare Development Group (DEVGRU), including one of the alleged killers of Osama bin Laden, Matt Bissonnete, who worked as consultants for the game were disciplined for releasing classified information to the game's creators. They received a punitive letter of reprimand and a partial forfeiture of pay for two months. The two main complaints against the SEALs were that they did not seek the permission of their commanding officer to take part in the project and that they showed the game designers some of their specially designed combat equipment unique to their unit. The military official briefed about the case was not authorized to speak publicly about it.

== Music ==
The music for Warfighter was composed by Ramin Djawadi, who also composed the music for Medal of Honor (2010). The official soundtrack was released on September 25, 2012, on iTunes and Amazon, nearly one month before the release of the game. The soundtrack consists of 21 tracks, 2 of which were composed by Mike Shinoda, the co-vocalist and rapper of Linkin Park. Linkin Park's song "Castle of Glass" from their album Living Things serves as the end credits song for Warfighter, and variations of the song appear on the soundtrack. Themes from the previous game reappear as well, albeit in slightly differed forms. The official video was released on October 10, 2012.

== Marketing ==
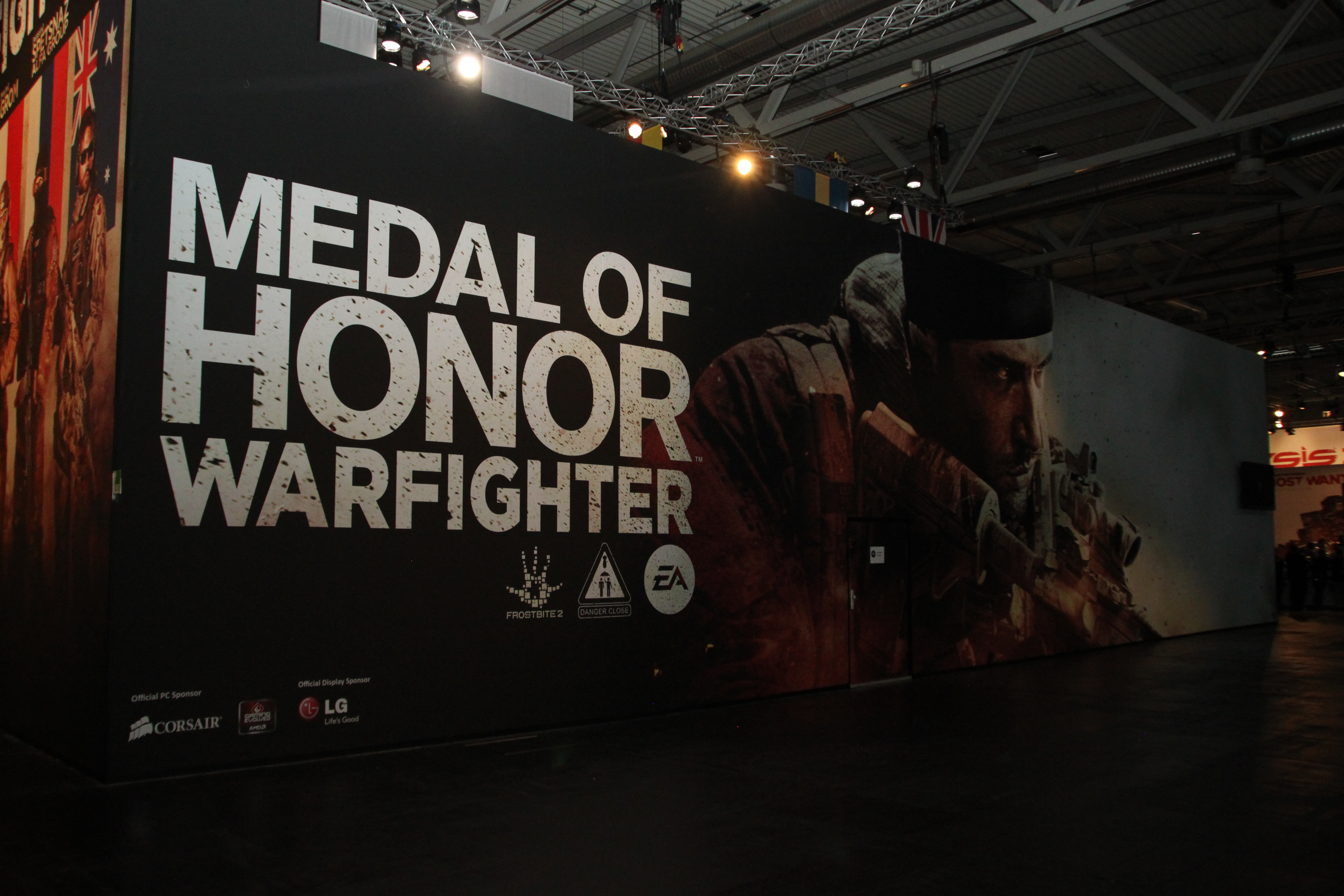
A demo of Medal of Honor: Warfighter was presented at Gamescom 2012 in Cologne, Germany.

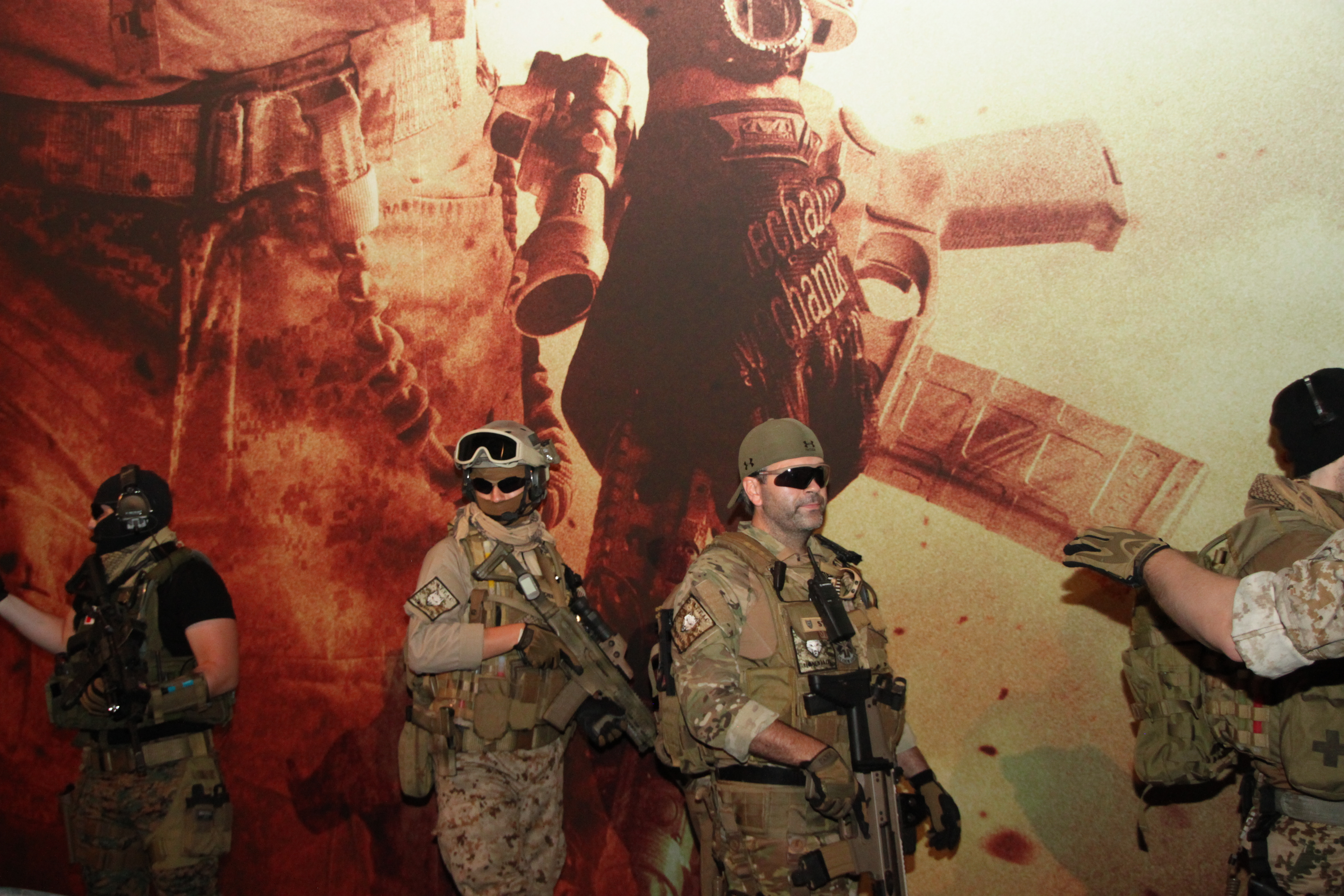
Promotion at Gamescom 2012

On October 25, 2011, an insert featuring promotional artwork was included with retail copies of Battlefield 3, featuring little more than a picture and a BBFC logo. On February 23, 2012, Warfighter was officially unveiled, alongside promotional artwork. On March 6, 2012, the premiere trailer was released on YouTube. On September 11, 2012, Danger Close unveiled the first gameplay trailer.

Executive producer Greg Goodrich has stated he wants to avoid the annual war of words that usually kicks off in the buildup to EA and Activision's end-of-year first-person shooter releases, and leave it to the publishing executives. He stated "I think that because of our genre and the history of our franchise... it's just a natural thing to want to go out and pick a fight. [But] if you look at it, almost none of it came from the development team. EA is a very big organisation, and there are a lot of grown-ups and adults that manage things that are out of our control."

=== Pre-order promotion ===
Pre-orders of Warfighter received an automatic upgrade to the Limited Edition of the game at no extra cost. The Limited Edition unlocked the U.S. Navy SEAL Tier 1 Sniper and the McMillan Tac-300 sniper rifle upon the game's launch. All those who had pre-ordered Warfighter received access to the Battlefield 4 beta. The Battlefield 4 beta took place during Autumn 2013.

=== Military Edition ===
Medal of Honor: Warfighter Military Edition bundles the limited edition of the shooter with additional in-game content, and is only available for active, reserve and former U.S. military personnel and US government employees exclusively on GovX.com.

The Military Edition includes all the perks of the game's Limited Edition, as well as "exclusive in-game unlocks", One particular unlock is a camouflage pattern named "Project HONOR", which is tied to a real-world promotion arranged by EA to raise money for the families of fallen Special Operations soldiers.

=== Downloadable content ===
Danger Close Games unveiled Medal of Honor: Warfighter: Zero Dark Thirty, the first official map pack. The DLC helped promote both the game and the film Zero Dark Thirty. EA and Sony pictures released a trailer on September 10, 2012. The pack became available for sale in North America on PlayStation 3 and Xbox 360 on December 17, 2012. Additional maps for the game were made available on December 19, to coincide with the film's initial release. Electronic Arts donated $1 to nonprofit organizations that support veterans for each Zero Dark Thirty map pack sold.

== Reception ==
=== Critical response ===
Reception

Aggregate score
Aggregator	Score
Metacritic	PC: 55/100; PS3: 55/100; X360: 53/100

Review scores
Publication	Score
Eurogamer	5/10
G4	2.5/5
Game Informer	5/10
GameSpot	6/10
GameSpy	2.5/5
GamesRadar+	3/5
GameTrailers	6.2/10
IGN	4/10
VideoGamer.com	5/10

Warfighter received mixed reviews. Although the visuals and Frostbite 2 engine were praised, criticism was directed towards its poorly executed and confusing storyline, poor AI, linear gameplay, and glitches (even after the day one patch). Aggregating review website Metacritic gave the Xbox 360 version 53/100, and the PlayStation 3 and PC versions 55/100.

IGN said "This is the first time we've seen a Frostbite Engine game failing to function at a basic level." Eurogamer gave it 5/10, Destructoid and VideoGamer.com both also gave the game a 5/10. The Financial Post gave the game a 5.5/10 saying that it was "hard to recommend", and GameThirst awarded the game 6/10 saying "There's no need to buy Warfighter, rent it instead." Joystiq scored the game 2/5: "The concept behind Warfighter is sound ... but the execution leaves a lot to be desired." StuffTV scored the game a 3/5: "Warfighter's single-player mode drops the ball so badly that it threatens to overshadow the clever buddy system...". The Huffington Post scored the game a 2/5. Kotaku reviewed the game poorly: "It's so brazenly unremarkable, its storytelling so amateurish, its action so rote, that it feels like a master class in middling modern warfare" and "Medal of Honor Warfighter is slipshod, uninspired, unpolished, and unfun." Game Informer gave the game a 5/10 saying "this once-loved series may be dangerously close to being put in a casket." GameSpot gave the game a 6/10 noting that the linear gameplay failed to add up to the tension, there is too much ammo and enemies show up in predictable places making the game too easy, poor storytelling, confined maps, and bugs like showing up in invisible places.

Despite the aforementioned military consultant input, bugs related to the depiction of military hardware were still present when the game shipped. Several days after release, Soldier Systems Daily, a tactical and defense industry blog which does not usually cover video games, posted an in-game screenshot showing a rifle with its backup iron sights (BUIS) mounted backwards.

Electronic Arts responded to the largely negative criticism saying that the launch "is coming in below our expectations". EA Labels president Frank Gibeau said, "We're disappointed with the critical reception. Internal testing and mock reviews indicated that the game is better than the [Metacritic] score we have right now. We believe it is. However, we are seeing folks out there that just don't like the game." Gibeau went on to say that EA is "not happy" with how the game has been received by the critics.

Despite the mixed response, the Academy of Interactive Arts & Sciences nominated Medal of Honor: Warfighter for "Outstanding Achievement in Sound Design" during the 16th Annual D.I.C.E. Awards.

=== Pakistani ban ===
The game drew criticism from Pakistan for its portrayal of the country as a "hotbed of terrorism". Medal of Honor: Warfighter and Call of Duty Black Ops II, both of which were released in 2012, were banned by the All Pakistan CD, DVD, Audio Cassette Traders and Manufacturers Association (APCDACTM) over their depictions of terrorism in the country and, in MoH Warfighter, the ISI's apparent support for terrorist organizations. However, access to the game did not see to be hindered as at least one large store in the capital of Islamabad was still making brisk sales of both games and pirated versions of the game are also easily available.

=== Sales ===
Despite the bad reviews, on October 27, Medal of Honor: Warfighter climbed to the number one spot in UK sales. According to GamesIndustry International, the game sold over 300,000 copies in its first week on shelves, "significantly below analyst expectations". Warfighter was the eighth-best-selling game in the month of October. The game dropped from the top 10 selling games charts in November 2012 following the release of Call of Duty: Black Ops II and Halo 4. In January 2013, it was reported that the game had shipped 3 million copies.

Peter Moore, COO of EA, revealed in their Q3 2013 earnings call that due to the game's "poor critical and commercial reception", the Medal of Honor series would be placed on hold. Richard Hilleman, chief creative officer at EA described Warfighter's poor performance as "an execution problem" caused by a lack of quality leadership. Hilleman stated that while Medal of Honor could make a return, EA's focus would be on the Battlefield series.

== Sequel ==
The next Medal of Honor game would not be released for eight years until Respawn Entertainment released Medal of Honor: Above and Beyond on December 11, 2020. It is set in World War II like the earlier games in the series. Unlike the other installments, Above and Beyond was released as a VR on Microsoft Windows only.
