= Medal of Honor: Allied Assault =

2002 video game

- PC cover art
- Developer: 2015: Westlake Interactive (Mac)
- Publisher: Electronic Arts: Aspyr (Mac)
- Designers: Vince Zampella; Jason West
- Writers: Zied Rieke; Steven Spielberg
- Composer: Michael Giacchino
- Series: Medal of Honor
- Engine: id Tech 3
- Platforms: Windows; Mac OS X
- Release: Windows: NA: January 22, 2002; EU: February 15, 2002; Mac OS X: NA: June 6, 2002
- Genre: First-person shooter
- Modes: Single-player, multiplayer

Medal of Honor: Allied Assault is a 2002 first-person shooter game developed by 2015 and published by Electronic Arts. It was released for Windows and Mac OS X as the third game in the Medal of Honor video game series. The game uses the id Tech 3 engine, with modifications from Heavy Metal: F.A.K.K.², to simulate infantry combat in the European and North African theaters during World War II.

== Gameplay ==
In Allied Assault, the player takes on the role of Lt. Mike Powell of the United States Army Rangers who works for the Office of Strategic Services. Single-player missions include assaulting Nazi bases in Algiers and Norway, storming Omaha Beach on D-Day, and rescuing comrades behind enemy lines in occupied France. The game's levels are often compared to Steven Spielberg's 1998 film Saving Private Ryan; many of the levels are direct quotations of the scenery (or even complete sequences as in the Omaha Beach mission) in the film. Omaha Beach was re-created in Medal of Honor: Frontline for consoles.

=== Multiplayer ===
Once a game server and type is selected the game starts in spectator mode and the player can choose between joining the allies or the axis then select the set of weapons. The game uses a point system, adding points for the number of kills and rounds, deducting points for suicides and addition of death points for getting killed.

Multiplayer contains four different modes. Deathmatch in which every player has to kill everyone else and get the highest score, Team Deathmatch in which a team has to kill other teams and get the highest score, Round Based which is similar in gameplay to Deathmatch but counts the rounds instead of the score and "Objective" mode where a player must win the most rounds by completing missions.

== Plot ==
Lieutenant Mike Powell, the protagonist, is a skilled U.S. Army Ranger and later an agent of the Office of Strategic Services. Powell and a squad of Rangers are in German-occupied Arzew, Algeria, fighting on the North African front. The squad fight their way into the city, but an ambush kills all the team except Powell. Powell continues into a German base, where he rescues S.A.S. agent Major Jack Grillo and retrieves his equipment. The major and Lt. Powell split up, with Grillo securing transport, while Powell does sabotage in a motor pool. He links back up with Grillo, who has commandeered a jeep with a mounted machinegun. The two drive to a German airfield, where they successfully destroy the Fw 190 fighters and Stuka dive bombers grounded there. While Grillo distracts the German forces, Powell sneaks into a bunker, cuts off Axis radio contact and fights his way to a coastal lighthouse to signal the Allied fleet to begin Operation Torch, the invasion of North Africa. He escapes with Grillo in a German transport truck. For his conduct during the mission, which included saving another American POW, Lt. Powell gets awarded with the Legion of Merit.

Following the Allies' success in Africa, Powell and Grillo are sent to German-occupied Norway to infiltrate the city of Trondheim, where a Kriegsmarine U-boat is being outfitted with a prototype Naxos radar detector. Grillo makes it into the base first, but is killed in action by German guards while opening the front gate for Powell. Powell fights his way into the base, where he disguises himself as a German officer and infiltrates the loading dock. He goes to the lab where he destroys the Naxos prototype and gains access to a submarine intended to be fitted with the prototype and blows it up. He fights his way out of the base, where he is extracted by an Allied squad. After the mission Powell gets awarded with Norwegian War cross with Sword medal, for securing the U-boat manifest.

Thanks to Powell's efforts, the German U-boat threat is neutralized, clearing the way for the Allied invasion of Europe, Operation Overlord. Powell, as a part of the 2nd Ranger Battalion, is sent to Charlie sector of Omaha Beach under Capt. Ramsay, where he and his fellow Rangers storm the bunkers, despite taking heavy casualties, and secure the beach. He is sent into the countryside beyond the beaches to assist the US airborne troops in clearing a path for the forces advancing from Omaha beach towards Carentan. Along the way he calls air support on several Flak 88 cannons and destroys a battery of Nebelwerfers. For his extraordinary bravery, Powell gets awarded with American Campaign Medal.

Powell is assigned to go behind enemy lines and acquire intelligence on German troop movements. After rescuing a shot down American reconnaissance pilot Joe Baylor, Powell meets up with French Resistance member Manon Batiste (the protagonist of Medal of Honor: Underground). She sends him out to conduct various acts of sabotage against the German war effort. He raids a manor house being used as a command post where he secures important enemy documents, including the blueprints for the new King Tiger tank. Powell escapes the manor house with Manon's aid. For destroying two King Tiger tanks, Powell gets awarded with Good Conduct Medal.

Powell's next mission involves hijacking a King Tiger tank and using it to secure a vital bridge at the city of Brest. After navigating through the sniper-infested ruins, he meets up with the American tank crew chosen for the mission. Powell and the tank crew capture the King Tiger and use it to fight their way through the countryside. Upon reaching Brest, Powell provides cover for the King Tiger to protect the bridge, until reinforcements come to secure it. For saving the entire tank crew, Powell gets awarded with Distinguished Service Medal.

Powell's final mission sends him to Fort Schmerzen, a German mustard gas-producing facility along the Siegfried Line that was previously raided by Lieutenant James Patterson (the main protagonist of Medal of Honor as well as Medal of Honor: Frontline), but has since been restored to operation, supposedly as a prisoner-of-war camp, but is being used to produce mustard gas. Powell is parachuted into the woods, where he destroys some Flak guns that are shooting Allied planes. Disguised as a German officer, he infiltrates a weapons depot, and destroys a stockpile of StG 44 assault rifles. He destroys afterwards a German communications outpost in a nearby town, cutting off Fort Schmerzen's communications. Powell hijacks a freight train and along with a squad of US Rangers, uses it to reach Schmerzen. Upon arriving at Schmerzen, Powell and his fellow Rangers storm the fort and release all the prisoners. Powell fights his way into the lower levels of Schmerzen, where he discovers that the fort's mustard gas production facilities are still operational. He plants explosives on the gas facilities, and escapes just before Fort Schmerzen is destroyed. For keeping most of his men alive during a firefight with German snipers upon arrival to Fort Schmerzen, Powell gets awarded the Commendation Medal.

For successfully completing the European tour of duty on easy difficulty, Powell gets awarded the Bronze Star Medal, for completing it on medium difficulty the Silver Star Medal and for hard difficulty Distinguished Service Cross.

== Development ==
Following the success of Medal of Honor: Underground, its publisher Electronic Arts contacted the Mesquite, Texas-based developer of Wolfenstein 3D and Doom, id Software about making another installment to the series. As they were already busy with developing Doom 3, id Software referred EA to 2015 as a potential developer. Initially, EA wanted 2015 to port the still-in-development Medal of Honor: Frontline by EA LA from the PlayStation 2 to PC, but 2015 eventually convinced EA to instead let them make a new original installment exclusive to the PC. The game's development consisted of a small tight-knit team of 22 developers led by Vince Zampella. Development spanned from 2000 to late 2001 and used id Software's id Tech 3 engine with modifications from Heavy Metal: F.A.K.K.².

== Legacy ==
Vince Zampella and Jason West left 2015 to later form Infinity Ward with Activision to develop the Call of Duty series, with the first installment taking inspiration from both Return to Castle Wolfenstein and Allied Assault.

== Expansion packs ==
=== Spearhead ===
The first expansion pack for Medal of Honor: Allied Assault. It re-enacts three major European Theater battles through the eyes of Sgt. Jack Barnes (voiced by Gary Oldman), a paratrooper of the 501st Parachute Infantry Regiment, 101st Airborne Division. Barnes lands behind the Atlantic Wall on D-Day in Normandy, holds the line near Bastogne in the Ardennes during the Battle of the Bulge and infiltrates Berlin before the Soviet Red Army begins their attack. The expansion has several new weapons added to the player's arsenal in Spearhead including the Russian PPSh-41 and the British Lee–Enfield.

Spearhead received a "Silver" sales award from the Entertainment and Leisure Software Publishers Association (ELSPA), indicating sales of at least 100,000 copies in the United Kingdom. It was nominated for GameSpot's annual "Best Expansion Pack on PC" award.

=== Breakthrough ===
Breakthrough, the second expansion pack for Medal of Honor: Allied Assault, puts the player in the role of Sgt. John Baker of the US 34th Infantry Division. The campaign covers the Battle of Kasserine Pass, the fall of Bizerte, the Allied invasion of Sicily in 1943, the bloody Battle of Monte Cassino, followed by the amphibious landings and defense of the beachhead at Anzio, Italy (Operation Shingle) and the battle of Monte Battaglia in September 1944. It adds the Spearhead weapons and some Italian weapons like the MAB 38 submachine gun as well as newer British weapons such as the De Lisle carbine and the PIAT anti-tank weapon.

== Compilations ==
=== Medal of Honor: Allied Assault Deluxe Edition ===
The first compilation pack included the Medal of Honor: Allied Assault main game, the Medal of Honor: Allied Assault Spearhead expansion pack, two strategy guides, a music CD soundtrack from Medal of Honor: Allied Assault and a preview of Medal of Honor: Pacific Assault.

=== Medal of Honor Allied Assault: War Chest ===
The second compilation pack included the Medal of Honor: Allied Assault main game and the Medal of Honor: Allied Assault Spearhead and Medal of Honor: Allied Assault Breakthrough expansion packs.

=== Medal of Honor: 10th Anniversary Bundle ===
Allied Assault and its expansion packs are included in the Medal of Honor: 10th Anniversary Bundle, along with a CD containing some of the game's soundtrack, as well as the inclusion of the director's cut of Medal of Honor: Pacific Assault, and Medal of Honor: Airborne.

== Music ==
Medal of Honor: Allied Assault (EA Games Soundtrack)

Soundtrack album by Michael Giacchino
- Released: August 30, 2005 (Digital)
- Genre: Video game soundtrack
- Length: 17:36
- Label: E.A.R.S.
- Producer: Michael Giacchino

Professional ratings
Review scores
Source	Rating
Game Music Online	8/10

The music for Allied Assault was composed by Michael Giacchino. The soundtrack was released on August 30, 2005, on iTunes and Amazon. The soundtrack consists of 5 tracks. In addition, Allied Assault reused various soundtracks from the original Medal of Honor and Medal of Honor: Underground, which were also composed by Giacchino. For the expansion packs, music tracks from Medal of Honor: Frontline were reused as well.

Medal of Honor: Allied Assault (EA Games Soundtrack) (Digital Release) (17:36)
No.	Title	Writer(s)	Length
1.	"MoH: Allied Assault (Main Theme)"	Michael Giacchino	4:04
2.	"North Africa"	Michael Giacchino	3:19
3.	"Schmerzen"	Michael Giacchino	3:37
4.	"Sniper Town"	Michael Giacchino	3:20
5.	"Tiger Tank"	Michael Giacchino	3:23

== Reception ==
Reception

Aggregate scores
Aggregator	Score
GameRankings	91.05%
Metacritic	91/100

Review scores
Publication	Score
Computer Gaming World	4.5/5
GameRevolution	4.5/5
GameSpot	9/10
GameSpy	4.5/5
IGN	9.3/10

Awards
Publication	Award
Metacritic	#4 Best PC Game of 2002
Metacritic	#7 Most Discussed PC Game of 2002

In the United States, Medal of Honor: Allied Assault sold 900,000 copies and earned $34.2 million by August 2006, after its release in January 2002. It was the country's ninth best-selling computer game between January 2000 and August 2006. Combined sales of all Medal of Honor computer games released between January 2000 and August 2006, including Allied Assault, had reached 1.9 million units in the United States by the latter date. It received a "Gold" sales award from the Entertainment and Leisure Software Publishers Association (ELSPA), indicating sales of at least 200,000 copies in the United Kingdom. Its Warchest release earned a "Silver" award from ELSPA, indicating sales of at least 100,000 copies in the United Kingdom.

Medal of Honor: Allied Assault was released to universal acclaim. It received a score of 91.05% on GameRankings and 91/100 on Metacritic.

Allied Assault won PC Gamer US' "2002 Best Action Game" and Computer Gaming World's "Action Game of the Year" awards. The latter magazine's editors hailed it as "the best single-player shooter since Half-Life." It also won GameSpot's annual "Best Sound on PC" award, and was nominated in its "Best Single-Player Action Game on PC" and "Best Multiplayer Action Game on PC" categories. During the 6th Annual Interactive Achievement Awards, the Academy of Interactive Arts & Sciences awarded Allied Assault for "Computer First-Person Action Game of the Year"; it also received nominations for "Computer Game of the Year" and "Innovation in Computer Gaming".

Medal of Honor: Allied Assault was the first PC game in the U.S. to be sold in new standard-sized packages recommended by IDSA, already standardized in console video game and DVD packaging.
