= Medal of Honor: Pacific Assault =

2004 video game

- Developer: EA Los Angeles
- Publisher: EA Games
- Artist: James H. Dargie
- Composer: Christopher Lennertz
- Series: Medal of Honor
- Engine: id Tech 3 (heavily modified)
- Platform: Microsoft Windows
- Release: NA: November 4, 2004; EU: November 19, 2004
- Genre: First-person shooter
- Modes: Single-player, multiplayer

Medal of Honor: Pacific Assault is a first-person shooter game developed by EA Los Angeles and published by Electronic Arts. It was released in North America on November 4, 2004, and in Europe on November 19, 2004, on Microsoft Windows as the seventh installment in the Medal of Honor video game series, serving as a sequel to the Medal of Honor: Allied Assault, with its story set during the Pacific War.

Medal of Honor: Pacific Assault introduced some new features to the franchise, such as recovering health by calling the corpsman, and the ability to order squad members to give covering fire, regroup, move up and fall back.

Medal of Honor: Pacific Assault Director's Edition features some additional content, such as a presentation that shows the history of American-Japanese war, behind the in-game missions (levels) and a built-in music player that allows the user to listen to the soundtrack.

== Plot ==
The game begins with the player, in the role of Pvt. Thomas Conlin, a U.S. Marine in the Pacific Theater of World War II, taking part in the landing on the Tarawa atoll. As Conlin's Amtrac approaches the shore, it's hit by an artillery shell, throwing Conlin and the other passengers into the shallow ocean, forcing them to wade ashore. Conlin fights his way onto the shore, only to get cut down by a bullet during a Japanese counterattack. As he bleeds out, the game flashes back to the start of Conlin's first day of basic training, where the player is introduced to the characters that will become his squad; the squad leader Frank Minoso; a big, smooth talking, New Jersey native; sniper William "Willie" Gaines, a country boy from North Carolina; and corpsman James Sullivan, a quiet sailor from a rich family in Oak Park, Illinois. After training, Conlin is assigned, without the rest of his training battalion, to serve aboard the USS Arizona. He arrives at Pearl Harbor early on the morning of December 7. Conlin is reassigned to the 2nd Marine Raider Battalion, and together with his old bootcamp training mate they take part in the Makin Island raid. During the raid, they are tasked with destroying a radio tower, destroying a supply dump, and rescuing a downed airman, before returning to their insertion point to fend off a Japanese counter-attack and defend their submarines from an aerial attack.

Following the Makin raid, the squad is assigned to the 1st Marine Raider Battalion and deployed in the Guadalcanal, where they are first tasked with the defence of Henderson Field and the outlying area against a Japanese attack, culminating in a push to re-take the airfield. They take part in the Battle of Edson's Ridge and patrols of the Lunga River. As part of the Guadalcanal Mission, Conlin becomes an impromptu pilot, as he is required to take control of the SBD Dauntless.

Afterwards, Conlin is promoted to sergeant and squad leader. During the invasion of Tarawa, Conlin secures the beachhead before neutralizing a major Japanese command center and destroying Japanese AA guns, which are used by the Japanese to prevent American landing craft from approaching Tarawa atoll. Conlin and his men then continue to clear Tarawa of the remaining enemy forces.

== Development ==
Pacific Assault was developed by EA Los Angeles and published by EA Games for the PC. It is primarily a first-person shooter, with the exception of one level in which the player flies an SBD Dauntless in the middle of a dog fight. The engine of the game is a modified id Tech 3 in additional with Havok physics engine. The music was composed by Christopher Lennertz. The game was officially announced on March 5, 2003.

== Reception ==
Reception

Aggregate score
Aggregator	Score
Metacritic	80/100

Review scores
Publication	Score
Computer Games Magazine	3.5/5
Computer Gaming World	4.5/5
Edge	5/10
Eurogamer	8/10
Game Informer	8.5/10
GamePro	4.5/5
GameRevolution	B
GameSpot	8.3/10
GameSpy	3.5/5
GameZone	9/10
IGN	7.8/10
PC Gamer (US)	79%
The Sydney Morning Herald	3.5/5

The game received "favorable" reviews according to video game review aggregator website Metacritic.

Pacific Assault received a "Silver" sales award from the Entertainment and Leisure Software Publishers Association (ELSPA), indicating sales of at least 100,000 copies in the United Kingdom.

During the 8th Annual Interactive Achievement Awards, the Academy of Interactive Arts & Sciences nominated Pacific Assault for "Computer First-Person Action Game of the Year", which was ultimately awarded to Half-Life 2.
