= Medal of Honor: European Assault =

2005 video game

- Developer: EA Los Angeles
- Publisher: EA Games
- Composer: Christopher Lennertz
- Series: Medal of Honor
- Platforms: GameCube; PlayStation 2; Xbox
- Release: NA: June 6, 2005; EU: June 17, 2005
- Genre: First-person shooter
- Modes: Single-player, multiplayer

Medal of Honor: European Assault is a first-person shooter game and the eighth installment in the Medal of Honor video game series. It was released for GameCube, PlayStation 2, and Xbox on June 6, 2005. The game's story was written by John Milius. The plot is based on Lieutenant William Holt, an operative in the Office of Strategic Services, and follows his deployments to allied forces in France, North Africa, the Soviet Union and Belgium.

The game received generally positive reviews.

== Gameplay ==
Gameplay of European Assault is similar to that of its predecessor, a first-person shooter; however, the weapons and interface have been slightly upgraded to be more player-friendly. Most notably the HUD has been upgraded to indicate primary and secondary target and show other squad members, and ironsights were added. The addition of Adrenaline Mode, activated by killing numerous enemies or scoring headshots, allows the player to be invincible and have unlimited ammo for a short period of time. As with all Medal of Honor games, the player is presented with a wide variety of weapons and stages pertaining to World War II.

=== Multiplayer ===
European Assault features an offline splitscreen multiplayer mode. The game contains three different modes of games (Death Match, Axis vs. Allies, Free for All), about a dozen maps, and differing game types in Free for All and Axis vs. Allies (e.g. Survival). It supports 2-4 players and has the option to create custom games with varying options depending on the mode.

== Plot ==
There are four overall areas the player (as Lt. William Holt) is sent to France, North Africa, the Soviet Union and Belgium. Each area has a set of missions for the player to complete. While some objectives will be detailed from the start, exploration of the area will cause Holt to discover more missions. Each mission consists of five elements: a primary objective, secondary objectives, killing a German officer (Nemesis battle in the game), obtaining documents from the officer and escaping. If all are completed, a gold medallion will be given. Missing one or two will gain a silver or bronze.

Most missions involve Holt fighting alongside allied non-player characters and working towards a common objective, often based on historical events during World War II. However, as a member of the OSS, Holt also has secondary objectives for each level, including finding documents and eliminating important German officers, such as henchmen belonging to the antagonist Graf Von Schrader.

=== St. Nazaire, France ===
In the beginning of the game, in a wholly fictionalized storyline based on Operation Chariot (as no Americans took part in the original raid), Holt and the British force are heading to the vital submarine pens at German-held St. Nazaire. They approach the port aboard HMS Campbeltown. However, the ship begins to take fire and soon raises the British Union Jack after they lose their cover. Upon landing, Holt is told to meet an officer that has the only radio after their radio officer is killed, at another side of the dock, which is denoted by a green flare. Upon meeting the officer, Holt has to head back to the ship to take cover from the airstrike the officer called, thus finishing the first mission. Then Holt goes with the British commandos on the St. Nazaire Raid, where he destroys a fuel tank and eliminates a German officer named Klaus Mueller. Holt also has the option to destroy a Flakvierling AA gun, and a shore gun. Holt later travels through the docks in order to destroy an electric power plant and a U-boat, shutting off power to the city and eliminating another German officer by the name of Horst Brenner. Early the next morning, Holt and his British comrades receive word that no reinforcements will be coming, forcing them to fight their way through two German Panzers. They must battle officer Erich Koster and his forces throughout the city to escape into the French countryside.

=== North Africa ===
Mission 1 in North Africa is to destroy Tiger tank prototypes. One of Holt's optional targets is a Nazi officer named Adabold Brecht. Optional objectives include blowing up a radar dish and taking out a panzer inside a destroyed village. After initial fighting, Holt makes his way inside a German compound and attempts to rescue captured SAS commandos and kill another of Von Schrader's men, Hans Schneider. With their help, Holt manages to get his hands on film which was recorded by Von Schrader, and ends up destroying a prototype V-2 rocket.

=== Soviet Union ===
There are 2 missions in the Soviet Union. The first mission is On the Road to Stalingrad. Holt's main objective is to destroy a rail gun on the other side of a river that runs through a small town. Holt also has an option to destroy 3 Panzers. The final part of the mission is to secure and then defend a fortified Church on the edge of town, and eliminate Walter Neumann. The second, and final, Soviet mission is Climbing Mamayev Hill. Holt, along with his squad and a Soviet battalion, lead a charge through a small village, driving the Germans back across a river. Holt must then follow them across the river and signal a rocket strike to clear the path. Once the area is secure, Holt's allies set themselves up around the entrance to a fort, on top of the hill. Once Holt blows the doors open, there is a fierce firefight. After destroying three artillery guns, Holt must eliminate Franz Greubner, and then Transmit Virus House Intel to the OSS (the Main Objective), before finally destroying the documents.

=== Belgium ===
The final mission of the game involves the Battle of the Bulge. Holt is sent in with the 101st Airborne Division, surrounded within the Ardennes forest in Belgium and participates in the battle to liberate the Bastogne Pocket. The Mission starts with an intense German offensive. Holt, with the help of paratroopers from the 101st Airborne manages to stop the initial assault by killing Folker Kappelhorf and blows up a strategically important bridge. Then Holt is sent to a Belgian farm to rescue Manon Batiste, a female OSS operative and the main character of Medal of Honor: Underground (although renamed to Manon Du Champs in European Assault), who was captured by Von Schrader's most loyal man, Freder Engel. After defeating Engel, he has to defend a farmhouse from a massive German assault until reinforcements arrive. Holt frees the operative. In the final mission, Holt, accompanied with a platoon of US soldiers, makes the critical assault on Von Schrader's Virus House. With one final suicide battle, Holt eliminates Von Schrader and destroys the dirty bomb by dropping it into the underground bunker at the last moment and escaping with some minor wounds.

== Reception ==
Reception

Aggregate score
Aggregator	Score		
Aggregator	GameCube	PS2	Xbox
Metacritic	71/100	73/100	72/100

Review scores
Publication	Score		
Publication	GameCube	PS2	Xbox
Edge	3/10	3/10	3/10
Electronic Gaming Monthly	6.67/10	6.67/10	6.67/10
Eurogamer	N/A	N/A	7/10
Game Informer	N/A	7.75/10	7.75/10
GamePro	N/A	4/5	N/A
GameRevolution	C−	C−	C−
GameSpot	7.6/10	7.6/10	7.6/10
GameSpy	4/5	4/5	4/5
GameTrailers	8.1/10	8.1/10	8.1/10
GameZone	N/A	8/10	8.3/10
IGN	8.1/10	8.1/10	8.1/10
Nintendo Power	8/10	N/A	N/A
Official U.S. PlayStation Magazine	N/A	4/5	N/A
Official Xbox Magazine (US)	N/A	N/A	7.7/10
Detroit Free Press	N/A	N/A	3/4
The Sydney Morning Herald	N/A	3.5/5	N/A

Medal of Honor: European Assault received "average" reviews, according to video game review aggregator website Metacritic.

Maxim gave the game a score of eight out of ten, stating that "It may not appease the history buffs, but it will delight the trigger-happy." Detroit Free Press gave the Xbox version a score of three stars out of four and stated, "It was maddening to nearly finish a mission, then die and have to start over. There are no checkpoints, but that's part of this game's challenge." The Sydney Morning Herald, however, gave the PS2 version a score of three-and-a-half stars out of five, saying that "Long-term appeal is doubtful with only 11 missions available and a lack of online support for multiplayer action."
