= Medal of Honor: Vanguard =

2007 video game

- Developers: EA Los Angeles (PS2); Budcat Creations (Wii)
- Publisher: Electronic Arts
- Composer: Michael Giacchino
- Series: Medal of Honor
- Platforms: PlayStation 2 Wii
- Release: NA: March 26, 2007; AU: March 29, 2007; EU: March 30, 2007
- Genre: First-person shooter
- Modes: Single-player, multiplayer

Medal of Honor: Vanguard is a 2007 first-person shooter game and the tenth installment in the Medal of Honor video game series. It was developed by EA Los Angeles and Budcat Creations and released for the PlayStation 2 and Wii.

== Plot ==
Players take on the role of Cpl/Sgt. Frank Keegan, a member of the 82nd Airborne Division, and 17th Airborne Division fighting the Axis forces of Nazi Germany and Fascist Italy.

The first mission takes place in 1943 during Operation Husky. Cpl. Keegan is in a C-47 aircraft somewhere off the coast of Sicily. when the airborne force he is assigned to is suddenly attacked by US Navy ships, believing the Allied planes to be German. Barely reaching the coast, the plane is ripped in half and Keegan and several other soldiers are thrown out. He manages to deploy his parachute and make it to the ground, where he meets up with his squad leader, MSgt. John Magnuson. They fight through the small coastal town against moderate opposition from Italian forces. The next morning the paratroopers fend off an enemy counterattack before clearing the main square and the rest of the town. Once through the town, they make their way to a nearby coastal bunker which houses several large cannons that threaten any Allied ships that come near. They blow the bunker open with explosives and shoot their way in, killing all of the German forces inside, before blowing up the cannons, finally safeguarding the Allied invasion force.

In the second mission, Keegan is part of a glider unit landed as part of Operation Neptune during the invasion of Normandy. The glider crashes hard during the landing and Keegan and the only other surviving soldier, Cpl. Garrett, move towards the rallying point, an old church near the edge of town, encountering large numbers of German troops along the way. Along the way they find two other members of their squad, Pfc. Pike and Pfc. Chalmers, who had parachuted into Normandy. Upon arriving, they find Sgt. Magnuson dangling from the church rafters, having landed there during the drop. Keegan manages to cut him down just as the Germans launch a counter-attack on the now trapped soldiers. They manage to fight off the German assault, but as he is opening a door leading out of the church, Keegan is knocked out by a German hiding on the other side. Waking up a short time later, Keegan and his squad then proceed to blow up several key bridges across the Normandy landscape, crosses one of the many flooded swamplands dotting Normandy, cut down several paratroopers stranded in trees, and finally locate bazooka components which Keegan assembles and uses to destroy a halftrack blocking their advance to the last bridge. As Keegan proceeds to plant charges on the final bridge, the explosives go off too early, killing some of Keegan's squadmates and leaving Keegan unconscious. Magnuson wakes him up next morning, but almost immediately gets shot in the head by a sniper. Keegan and his squad assault the house where the sniper was located and eliminate him. They then make their way to a large road bridge leading to a chateau where the Germans are headquartered. They fight their way across the bridge under heavy fire and through the chateau, only to discover it to be a trap and are quickly surrounded by four Tiger tanks that Keegan promptly eliminates. After the ambush, Keegan is promoted to the Sergeant due to Magnuson's death.

The third mission takes place during Operation Market Garden, where the newly promoted Sgt. Keegan now leads his squad through the battle. During the operation, Keegan's squad fights their way through the countryside until they reach the strategically important Grave Bridge, which they eventually capture. They then move on to the town of Grave, where they encounter heavy fire from MG42 machine gun emplacements throughout the town. Approaching the town square, Keegan and the other soldiers are attacked by a Tiger tank, which kills Chalmers before Keegan finally destroys it.

The fourth and final mission in the game takes place during Operation Varsity. Keegan, now transferred to the 17th Airborne Division, lands on the bank of the Rhine River, where he and the paratroopers take heavy fire from Wehrmacht forces. They make their way to a German industrial complex, where they fight off several brutal counterattacks before continuing on to a German trench system. After neutralizing the trenches and the defences surrounding them, Keegan must make his way alone through a wrecked factory full of German snipers. He manages to make his way through and regroups with the surviving members of his squad just outside of the complex just as hundreds of Fallschirmjager troops launch a major counter-attack with a large number of tanks in support. They successfully repel the attack, with a final scene showing the remaining German troops retreating back into the outlying hills.

== Gameplay ==
The game shares many gameplay elements with Medal of Honor: Airborne. Players are able to customize their weapons, such as adding a telescopic sight to a M1 Garand rifle and a drum magazine for a Thompson submachine gun, although these upgrades are only available on certain levels.

At the start of each of the operations, players parachute onto a battlefield (with the exception of a glider insertion at the start of the Invasion of Normandy) and can roughly designate where they land. Players who land at points marked by green smoke will be able to pick up weapon upgrades and ammunition. Missions can be played out in different ways depending on where players lands and which weapons they obtain.

Content-wise, both versions of the game are the same. However, the Wii version implements the Wii Remote to accomplish such movements as crouching, jumping, making quick turns, weapon strikes, reloading, and shooting. These actions are accomplished with a standard video game interface (buttons and joysticks) on the PS2 version and are also an option on the Wii.

=== Multiplayer ===
Multiplayer has been included in the game in the form of a 2-4 player split-screen mode with both the Wii and PS2 versions. (The PS2 version requires a multitap to support more than two players.) This is currently the last Medal of Honor game to feature split screen mode. There are five modes:

- Deathmatch
- Team Deathmatch
- Capture the Flag
- King of the Hill
- Scavenger Hunt

== Reception ==
Reception

Aggregate score
Aggregator	Score	
Aggregator	PS2	Wii
Metacritic	63/100	56/100

Review scores
Publication	Score	
Publication	PS2	Wii
Eurogamer		4/10
Game Informer	6/10	4/10
GameRevolution	C−	C−
GameSpot	5.5/10	5.5/10
GameSpy	3/5	3/5
IGN	7.2/10	7/10
Nintendo Power		6/10
PlayStation: The Official Magazine	7/10	

Medal of Honor: Vanguard received "mixed" reviews on both platforms according to video game review aggregator website Metacritic.

GameSpot gave the game 5.5 out of 10 for both the Wii and PS2 versions. Most criticism for the game focused the poor graphics engine, lack of online play, and poor enemy intelligence. Also criticized was that many of the game elements were already featured in the series or by other World War II shooters (with the exception of the parachute drop). Aaron Thomas of GameSpot stated that "There's really no reason to pick it up on the PlayStation 2, and thanks to a higher price tag for the Wii version, there's very little reason to buy it for the Wii, either." United Kingdom-based website Mansized gave the Wii version two out of five, claiming, "Vanguard is a pretty shocking game."
