= Medal of Honor (1999 video game) =

1999 video game

- European cover art
- Developer: DreamWorks Interactive
- Publisher: Electronic Arts
- Producers: Steven Spielberg; Peter Hirschmann
- Designers: Christopher Cross; Lynn Henson
- Programmers: Michael Heilemann; Adrian Jones
- Artists: Matt Hall; Sunil Thankamushy
- Writers: Steven Spielberg; Peter Hirschmann
- Composer: Michael Giacchino
- Series: Medal of Honor
- Platform: PlayStation
- Release: NA: November 10, 1999; EU: December 10, 1999
- Genre: First-person shooter
- Modes: Single-player, multiplayer

Medal of Honor is a 1999 first-person shooter video game developed by DreamWorks Interactive and published by Electronic Arts for the PlayStation. The first installment in the Medal of Honor series, the game features the combined arms warfare of World War II as the player completes various missions for the Office of Strategic Services.

Medal of Honor's concept, production and story were created by American filmmaker Steven Spielberg, who had a deep interest in World War II, and found further inspiration from watching his son play GoldenEye 007. While in development, the game experienced controversy due to the Columbine High School massacre, and was criticized by the Congressional Medal of Honor Society for turning a serious topic into a video game. Game producer Peter Hirschmann convinced Medal of Honor Society president Paul Bucha that the project was made with serious and honorable intentions, saving the project from cancellation, and earning Bucha's endorsement.

Medal of Honor was released to universal acclaim, and has been credited with popularizing the trend of World War II shooters. The game was followed by Medal of Honor: Underground a year later, leading to a widely successful series.

== Gameplay ==
Medal of Honor takes place near the end of World War II (mid-1944 to mid-1945). The goal of the game is to complete various Office of Strategic Services (OSS) missions, such as rescuing an American pilot, going undercover to board and destroy a U-boat, recovering stolen art work, and sabotaging the Nazi war effort.

The game includes a split-screen deathmatch mode, pitting two players against each other in various maps. Players can unlock several secret characters after completing the game or through cheat codes, including notable historical figures such as Filipino patriot José Rizal and playwright William Shakespeare, as well as outlandish characters such as a German Shepherd and a dinosaur.

== Development ==
Filmmaker Steven Spielberg founded DreamWorks Interactive with Microsoft in 1995, as part of a trend of Hollywood studios setting up their own interactive divisions, such as Disney Interactive. Spielberg had recognized the entertainment potential of video games earlier than other Hollywood veterans, as he already had experience consulting on projects for both Atari and LucasArts.

Medal of Honor was a passion project that emerged during Spielberg's work on the film Saving Private Ryan, with development of the game beginning on November 11, 1997. Spielberg held a meeting with his staff, outlining his idea for a first-person shooter set during World War II. The idea originated from Spielberg's deep interest in World War II, while also watching his son Max playing the James Bond-themed game GoldenEye 007.

According to game producer Peter Hirschmann, the studio's corporate management was worried that World War II was dated, and players were more interested in "ray guns, hell-spawn and laser rifles". The studio recruited Dale Dye as the game's military advisor, who had previously advised Spielberg on Saving Private Ryan. Dye criticized their first demo as exploitative and irresponsible, but continued with the project due to his belief that the studio had honorable intentions, improving the game's historical authenticity with nostalgic and educational segments.

By March 1998, the game had reached its prototype stage with significant differences from the original version. Spielberg was determined to pioneer new experiences in interactive entertainment, such as a "show me your papers" sequence where the player brandishes fake ID papers instead of a gun. The new demo was well received by publisher Electronic Arts, but was soon mired in controversy as the 1999 Columbine High School massacre attracted more scrutiny onto video games. The team decided to remove particularly gory scenes from the game, particularly an animation where a maimed Nazi soldier appeared to dance around before collapsing. Still, the Congressional Medal of Honor Society president Paul Bucha heard about the game's development, and criticized them for using a serious and sacred symbol such as the Medal of Honor for a video game. Spielberg considered cancelling the project, but Peter Hirschmann showed Bucha a demo and convinced him of the project's seriousness, saving the project from cancellation, and earning an endorsement from the Medal of Honor society.

The game was released in 1999, with Steven Spielberg credited for its story, and film composer Michael Giacchino credited with the game's full orchestral score. The studio experienced severe losses through the production of the game, and was sold to EA, ironically before the game became highly profitable. Medal of Honor was re-released on PlayStation Network as a PS One Classic on June 2, 2009, in North America.

== Reception ==
Reception

Aggregate score
Aggregator	Score
Metacritic	92/100

Review scores
Publication	Score
AllGame	4.5/5
Edge	8/10
Electronic Gaming Monthly	9/10
GameFan	79%
GamePro	5/5
GameRevolution	A−
GameSpot	8.5/10
IGN	9.3/10
Next Generation	4/5
Official U.S. PlayStation Magazine	4/5
PlayStation: The Official Magazine	5/5
The Cincinnati Enquirer	3/4

Medal of Honor received an aggregate score of 92 out of 100 on review aggregator website Metacritic, indicating "universal acclaim". IGN gave the game its "editor's choice" award, with reviewer Doug Perry praising the gameplay, sound, level design, attention to detail. GamePro called the game "one of the year's top titles and a must-own game", praising it for featuring "some of the most tense first-person action ever delivered on the Playstation". Jeff Lundrigan of Next Generation called it "the best PlayStation first-person shooter in ages", while PSM stated that the game was "an extraordinary game with no equal on the PlayStation".

Medal of Honor received a "Gold" sales award from the Entertainment and Leisure Software Publishers Association (ELSPA), indicating sales of at least 200,000 copies in the United Kingdom.

Medal of Honor won the award for "Outstanding Achievement in Sound Design" from the Academy of Interactive Arts & Sciences during the 3rd Annual Interactive Achievement Awards.

== Legacy ==
IGN ranked Medal of Honor as the 20th-best shooter game of all time, crediting it with popularizing the trend of World War II shooters, as well as creating the highly popular series. Several members of the game's team recall that the game was one of the first marriages between game and film, showing that video games could tackle a serious topic like World War II with gravitas. In the final issue of the Official UK PlayStation Magazine, the game was chosen as the eighth-best game of all time. IGN ranked the game 21st on their list of the "Top 25 Games of All Time" for the PlayStation console. Time Extension placed the game on their "Best FPS Games" list and said it popularized the World War II FPS genre.

Medal of Honor is the first in the Medal of Honor series, and was followed by the direct sequel Medal of Honor: Underground in 2000.
