= Pro Evolution Soccer (disambiguation) =

Pro Evolution Soccer is a series of association football video games, It may refer to:

- Pro Evolution Soccer (video game)
  - Pro Evolution Soccer 2
  - Pro Evolution Soccer 3
  - Pro Evolution Soccer 4
  - Pro Evolution Soccer 5
  - Pro Evolution Soccer 6
  - Pro Evolution Soccer 2008
  - Pro Evolution Soccer 2009
  - Pro Evolution Soccer 2010
  - Pro Evolution Soccer 2011
  - Pro Evolution Soccer 2012
  - Pro Evolution Soccer 2013
  - Pro Evolution Soccer 2014
  - Pro Evolution Soccer 2015
  - Pro Evolution Soccer 2016
  - Pro Evolution Soccer 2017
  - Pro Evolution Soccer 2018
  - Pro Evolution Soccer 2019
  - eFootball PES 2020
    - eFootball PES 2021 Season Update
  - Pro Evolution Soccer Management
