= ISS Pro Evolution 2 =

2000 video game

- Developer: Konami Computer Entertainment Tokyo
- Publisher: Konami (Note: Released under the Konami Sports label in Japan and ESPN the games label in Europe)
- Series: International Superstar Soccer; Winning Eleven
- Platform: PlayStation
- Release: JP: August 24, 2000; EU: March 23, 2001
- Genre: Sports
- Modes: Single player, multiplayer

ISS Pro Evolution 2 (known as World Soccer Jikkyou Winning Eleven 2000: U-23 Medal e no Chousen, "World Soccer Live Winning Eleven 2000: Challenge for the Olympic Medal" in Japan) is the fourth video game in the ISS Pro series and the second installment of the ISS Pro Evolution series, as well as the last one with the ISS name as the next entry would become the formal beginning of the Pro Evolution Soccer series, developed exclusively for the PlayStation by Konami Computer Entertainment Tokyo, a division of Konami. It was available in Europe and Japan but not available in North America due to the previously released enhanced remake version of the previous entry in the series, ISS Pro Evolution, retitled ESPN MLS GameNight with MLS licenses.

It is the first ISS Pro game with proper licenses, although partial, some players having real names — e.g. Beckham instead of Bekham (ISS Pro Evolution). The game has an extended Master League, with 2 divisions and eight more clubs, resulting in a total of twenty four club teams, such as Leeds United and River Plate. More international teams have been added as well. Next to these additions, the gameplay has changed, as it is smoother and more realistic. The Japanese version of the game contains under-23 national teams (including Japan's) that qualified for the final round at the Sydney Olympics, which are not present in the European versions of the game.

ISS Pro Evolution 2 won the BAFTA Interactive Entertainment Awards for "Best Sports Game" in 2001, The game also nominated for "Game of the Year" by British magazine Edge in early 2002, but lost to Halo: Combat Evolved (for Xbox and Windows 9x Compatible-PC).

== Features ==
- New chip shots feature
- Cancel pass action
- Realistic injuries
- Choose your captain
- New formation data manager with 15 save spots and a much improved algorithm (the key to player's movement).
- New format for All-Star teams
- 16 U-23 teams from Sydney Olympics (Japanese version only)

=== Game modes ===
- Match Mode (Exhibition and Penalty Kick).
- League Mode.
- Cup Mode: Regional U-23 (Japanese version only) or International Cup competition.
- Master League: 24 teams spread over two divisions.
- Practice Mode
- Edit players, change a players nationality, view the trophy gallery and tweak your controller.

== Reception ==
=== Critical ===
The game received highly positive reviews from critics, scoring 95/100 on Metacritic. Gibbons of BBC Sport gave the game 94% citing that "ISS Pro Evolution 2 is the finest football game the world has ever seen and It's OK for a little run-around kind of football game, but if you want to enjoy the intricate skills of our national game, This game is the fan's only real choice." The game received 92% by Absolute-PlayStation. In the final issue of the Official UK PlayStation Magazine, the game was chosen as the best PlayStation game of all time. Gideon Kibblewhite of GamesRadar+ gave the game Direct Hit citing that "The best football sim in the world just got better. Amazingly. In a subtle, magical sort of way. So forget about FIFA and all those other two penny outfits that flatter to deceive - they're not even in the same league."

However, Swedish video game magazine Super PLAY gave the game 7 out of 10' stating, "In summary, it is possible to say that ISS Pro Evolution 2 is another step away from the layout once made International Superstar Soccer so unique. Although it is not visible in the graphics, Konami knows how to fully utilize PlayStation's capacity. Both the control and the artificial intelligence hold a very high class. But if it's realistic football game that Konami wants to do, they should still think about bringing more club teams. And then they must learn to spell the names of the players. M-E-L-L-B-E-R-G, light as a spot."

=== Sales ===
According to the Japanese magazine Famitsu ISS Pro Evolution 2 sold a total of 362,989 units in Japan by the end of 2000, making it the 21st best-selling game of the year in the country.

== See also ==
- International Superstar Soccer Pro
- International Superstar Soccer Pro 98
- ISS Series
- Winning Eleven
