= Pro Evolution Soccer 2012 =

2011 video game

- Cover art featuring Real Madrid's Cristiano Ronaldo
- Developer: Konami
- Publisher: Konami
- Producer: Shingo Takatsuka
- Series: Pro Evolution Soccer
- Platforms: Microsoft Windows; PlayStation 2 PlayStation 3 PlayStation Portable; Xbox 360; Wii; Nintendo 3DS iOS; Android; Windows Phone 7 Xperia Play
- Release: September 27, 2011: PlayStation 3, Windows & Xbox 360; NA: September 27, 2011 (PS3, X360); KOR: October 6, 2011 (PS3, X360); JP: October 6, 2011 (PS3); AU: October 13, 2011; EU: October 14, 2011 iOS; NA: September 29, 2011 PlayStation 2 & PlayStation Portable; KOR: October 3, 2011 (PSP); EU: October 28, 2011; KOR: November 3, 2011 (PS2); JP: November 3, 2011; NA: November 8, 2011; AU: November 10, 2011 (PS2); AU: November 17, 2011 (PSP) Wii; JP: November 3, 2011; EU: November 4, 2011; NA: November 15, 2011; AU: November 24, 2011 3DS; EU: December 1, 2011; JP: December 8, 2011; NA: February 1, 2012 Windows Mobile; NA: February 23, 2012
- Genre: Sports
- Modes: Single-player, multiplayer

Pro Evolution Soccer 2012 (PES 2012, known as World Soccer: Winning Eleven 2012 in Asia) is a video game which is the eleventh edition in the Pro Evolution Soccer series developed and published by Konami. Lionel Messi, who was the cover star for the series since PES 2009, was replaced by PES 2008 cover star Cristiano Ronaldo, while Borussia Dortmund player Shinji Kagawa replaces Messi as the cover star for the Japanese release. The US and Latin American cover features Santos player Neymar and Cristiano Ronaldo.

Like previous versions of the game, it was licensed by UEFA to contain the UEFA Champions League, UEFA Europa League and UEFA Super Cup competitions along with a license from CONMEBOL to feature the Copa Santander Libertadores. Referees' governing UEFA Champions League, UEFA Europa League and UEFA Super Cup matches will wear the official UEFA Champions League uniforms, which is a first for the series. Primeira Liga were included for the first time in series with three licensed teams.

On July 28, 2011, Konami confirmed that PES 2012 was going to be released for PlayStation 3, Xbox 360 and Microsoft Windows on October 14, 2011 in Europe and October 6, 2011 in Japan. At Gamescom 2011 it was announced that the PlayStation 2 and PlayStation Portable versions would follow on October 28, 2011 and the Wii on November 4, 2011. The publisher has also confirmed that versions for Nintendo 3DS and iOS formats are also in development, with firm dates to follow. PES 2012 was succeeded by Pro Evolution Soccer 2013.

Online services for the game were shut down on January 28, 2013 due to focusing to newer PES games.

== Gameplay ==
PES 2012's gameplay is primarily a refinement of PES 2011, with many improvements and changes in areas such as artificial intelligence, speed, animation, and physics.

Among the new features is the Teammate Control system, where a secondary player may be controlled, either during play, or at a set piece or throw-in. This allows players to be placed precisely, make runs, and shake off markers before calling for the ball. Manual and assisted versions of the feature are available for varying degrees of difficulty and control.

Refereeing has been improved and includes a full implementation of the advantage rule, with the referee pulling back play for bookings after the ball goes out of play. The "catch-up bug", where defenders would catch dribbling attackers too easily, regardless of the attacker's pace, will be addressed. Gameplay is more fluid, with better response when controlling the ball, and goalkeepers have been improved with new animations and generally more reliable goalkeeping performances. Artificial intelligence has been improved over previous PES games, for example AI players will play more thoughtfully when defending rather than simply applying pressure, and AI teammates will make more intelligent movement decisions.

== Content ==
Thanks to an exclusive deal with UEFA and CONMEBOL, the UEFA Champions League, the UEFA Europa League, the UEFA Super Cup and the Copa Santander Libertadores are fully licensed. The tournaments are integrated into the new mode, Football Life, which features a Master League mode and a Become a Legend mode, and for the first time, a Club Boss mode. The Football Life mode also includes a Master League Online mode, however, fan favourite 2V2 Ranked Matches have been removed from the Xbox 360 version due to "internal decisions".

Like previous versions, there is also a separate two leagues with 18 empty teams (PES League and D2 League), each of which can be edited fully. All the teams are entirely fictional.

The UEFA Europa League, the UEFA Super Cup and the PES and D2 Leagues are features not included in the PSP version of the game.

=== Stadiums ===
PES 2012 contains 30 stadiums, 17 licensed, 12 unlicensed, and 1 that is entirely fictional. There is also a Stadium Editor which allows stadiums to be created and added to the selection.

== Reception ==
Reception

Aggregate scores
Aggregator	Score							
Aggregator	3DS	iOS	PC	PS2	PS3	PSP	Wii	Xbox 360
GameRankings	74.60%	65%	77%	N/A	79.70%	N/A	79.75%	78.04%
Metacritic	73/100	61/100	77/100	75/100	80/100	74/100	79/100	78/100

Review scores
Publication	Score							
Publication	3DS	iOS	PC	PS2	PS3	PSP	Wii	Xbox 360
Eurogamer	N/A	N/A	N/A	N/A	N/A	N/A	N/A	8/10
Game Informer	N/A	N/A	N/A	N/A	9/10	N/A	N/A	9/10
GamePro	N/A	N/A	N/A	N/A	3.5/5	N/A	N/A	3.5/5
GameRevolution	N/A	N/A	N/A	N/A	B+	N/A	N/A	N/A
GameSpot	N/A	N/A	N/A	N/A	8/10	N/A	N/A	8/10
GameSpy	N/A	N/A	3.5/5	N/A	N/A	N/A	N/A	N/A
GameTrailers	N/A	N/A	N/A	N/A	N/A	N/A	N/A	8.4/10
IGN	N/A	N/A	N/A	N/A	8/10	N/A	N/A	8/10
Official Xbox Magazine (US)	N/A	N/A	N/A	N/A	N/A	N/A	N/A	8/10
PC Gamer (UK)	N/A	N/A	84%	N/A	N/A	N/A	N/A	N/A
PlayStation: The Official Magazine	N/A	N/A	N/A	N/A	8/10	N/A	N/A	N/A
Digital Spy	N/A	N/A	N/A	N/A	4/5	N/A	N/A	N/A
The Guardian	N/A	N/A	N/A	N/A	N/A	N/A	N/A	3/5

The game was met with positive to mixed reception. GameRankings and Metacritic gave it a score of 79.75% and 79 out of 100 for the Wii version; 79.70% and 80 out of 100 for the PlayStation 3 version; 78.04% and 78 out of 100 for the Xbox 360 version; 77% and 77 out of 100 for the PC version; 75 out of 100 for the PlayStation 2 version; 74 out of 100 for the PSP version; 74.60% and 73 out of 100 for the 3DS version; and 65% and 61 out of 100 for the iOS version.

Digital Spy gave the PS3 version a score of four stars out of five, saying that, "For all of its drawbacks, when the whistle blows and the game kicks off, PES 2012 offers a satisfying, unpredictable and utterly enjoyable game of virtual football." The Daily Telegraph gave the X360 version three-and-a-half stars out of five and stated, "The improvements in AI and excellent online modes are a solid basis to continue re-building PES to its former glory, but the weird physics and newfound lack of weight are a concern. It still feels like PES just isn't 100% sure where it should be going." The Digital Fix also gave the same version seven out of ten. 411Mania gave said version 6.5 out of 10 and called it "a fun game that keeps pace with its competitors. Generally the game is good, but many of its flaws really hurt the game. I felt that many of the issues could have been fixed and would have made this a much better game. Maybe next year this game will finally be the top game in the genre of Soccer games." The Guardian gave the same version three stars out of five and said, "The frantic and occasional flawed action on the pitch harks back to older PES games. Fifa 12 [sic] is the more complete football experience but PES 2012 can still deliver in short hectic doses."
