= Pro Evolution Soccer 2008 =

2007 video game

- European cover, featuring Newcastle United's Michael Owen and Portugal's Cristiano Ronaldo
- Developer: Konami
- Publisher: Konami
- Series: Pro Evolution Soccer
- Platforms: Microsoft Windows; PlayStation 2; PlayStation 3; PlayStation Portable; Xbox 360; Wii; Nintendo DS
- Release: Nintendo DS: JP: October 25, 2007; EU: February 1, 2008; AU: March 7, 2008; NA: March 11, 2008; PlayStation 2, PlayStation 3 & Xbox 360: EU: October 26, 2007; AU: November 8, 2007; JP: November 22, 2007; AS: November 22, 2007 (PS3); NA: March 11, 2008; Windows: EU: October 26, 2007; AU: November 21, 2007; PlayStation Portable: JP: January 24, 2008; EU: February 29, 2008; AU: March 7, 2008; NA: March 11, 2008; Wii: JP: February 21, 2008; NA: March 18, 2008; EU: March 28, 2008; AU: April 17, 2008
- Genre: Sports game
- Modes: Single-player, multiplayer

Pro Evolution Soccer 2008 (PES 2008), known as World Soccer: Winning Eleven 2008 in Asia and sometimes called World Soccer: Winning Eleven 11 (PS2) in North America, is an association football video game in the Pro Evolution Soccer series by Konami. The game was announced on 18 June 2007. Its title is different from the other Pro Evolution Soccer games in that it is of a year and not a version; this was due to EA Sports' FIFA series naming their titles with two digit numbers (i.e. 07, 08), which would seem that PES was a year behind FIFA (to non-fans which had no knowledge of the previous games of the franchise); it is also the first game to use the PES title for the American market, which previously used the Japanese name. It was released for Windows, Wii, Nintendo DS, PlayStation 3, PlayStation 2, PlayStation Portable, and Xbox 360. The game sold 6.37 million units worldwide. PES 2008 was succeeded by Pro Evolution Soccer 2009. This was the first game of the series to be released for the PS3 and Wii, as well as the first game in the series to be internationally available on a Nintendo home console.

== Wii version ==
The Nintendo Wii version of PES 2008 (named Winning Eleven Play Maker 2008 in Japan) differs radically from the other versions. The basic gameplay is centered around pointing the Wii Remote at the screen and directing players by dragging them with the on-screen cursor, and passing is done by simply pointing to the desired space or player and pressing a button. This allows for a more tactical approach to the game, as there is almost complete freedom in moving any player on the screen anywhere, and much more tactics and maneuvers can be used in the attacking game than ever before.

This version omits the Master League mode for the Champions Road, which lets the player tour a slew of different leagues around Europe, and when a games is won, it is possible to acquire players from the defeated teams. Also, it features an online mode that Konami called "the best online experience" when compared to the other versions.

== Teams ==
=== Unlicensed leagues ===
The leagues below are partially unlicensed, and some teams from these leagues are unlicensed:

- (England) Premier League

=== Licensed leagues ===
The leagues below are fully licensed, and all teams from these leagues are licensed:

- (Spain) La Liga Santander
- (France) Ligue 1
- (Italy) Serie A
- (Netherlands) Eredivisie

=== Generic Teams ===
There is also a separate league with 18 generic teams (Team A, Team B etc.), which can be edited fully, like in the previous game. This is thought to be due to the fact that Konami failed to get the rights to the German Bundesliga, and is usually made into the Bundesliga or another league of one's preference by patch makers. However, most people use this to put their edited players into playable teams from the start instead of having to play through Master League to purchase them or alternatively edit the existing non-generic teams. This feature does not appear in the Wii version of the game.

== Covers ==
Portugal and (at the time) Manchester United player Cristiano Ronaldo is included on all PES 2008 covers, along with Newcastle United striker Michael Owen in the UK, Juventus goalkeeper Gianluigi Buffon in Italy, West Ham United defender Lucas Neill in Australia, and Chelsea F.C. striker Didier Drogba in France. Also in the Japanese version, the cover art features only Cristiano Ronaldo himself.

== Commentators ==
Jon Champion and Mark Lawrenson provide the English commentary for the first time, replacing long-time commentary team Peter Brackley and Trevor Brooking, who commentated from Pro Evolution Soccers 2 to 6. Also in the Japanese version, Jon Kabira and Tsuyoshi Kitazawa continue as commentators among Masahiro Fukuda and the pitch reporter was Florent Dabadie.

== Reception ==
Reception

Aggregate scores
Aggregator	Score						
Aggregator	DS	PC	PS2	PS3	PSP	Wii	Xbox 360
GameRankings	58.57%	78.50%	82.58%	73.46%	79.74%	83.60%	75.53%
Metacritic	58/100	N/A	82/100	74/100	80/100	83/100	76/100

Review scores
Publication	Score						
Publication	DS	PC	PS2	PS3	PSP	Wii	Xbox 360
1Up.com	N/A	N/A	N/A	C+	N/A	B	N/A
Eurogamer	6/10	N/A	N/A	8/10	7/10	8/10	N/A
Game Informer	N/A	N/A	N/A	7.75/10	N/A	8/10	7.75/10
GameSpot	6/10	7/10	7.5/10	6/10	7/10	8/10	7/10
GameSpy	N/A	N/A	4/5	3/5	3.5/5	N/A	3/5
IGN	(US) 5.5/10 (UK) 4.7/10	N/A	8.4/10	(UK) 9.2/10 (US) 8.6/10	(UK) 8.9/10 (US) 8.3/10	(UK) 8.9/10 (US) 8.6/10	(UK) 9.2/10; 8.6/10
Official Nintendo Magazine	N/A	N/A	N/A	N/A	N/A	90%	N/A
Official Xbox Magazine (US)	N/A	N/A	N/A	N/A	N/A	N/A	4.5/10
PC Gamer (UK)	N/A	86%	N/A	N/A	N/A	N/A	N/A
PC PowerPlay	N/A	6/10	N/A	N/A	N/A	N/A	N/A
PlayStation: The Official Magazine	N/A	N/A	N/A	4/5	N/A	N/A	N/A
Digital Spy	N/A	N/A	N/A	3/5	N/A	4/5	N/A

The game sold 6.37 million units worldwide in 2007. Its sales were very close to rival FIFA 2008, which sold 6.55 million units in 2007.

The PlayStation 2 and Xbox 360 releases of Pro Evolution Soccer 2008 each received a "Platinum" sales award from the Entertainment and Leisure Software Publishers Association (ELSPA), indicating sales of at least 300,000 copies per version in the United Kingdom. Pro Evolution Soccer 2008 sold approximately 104,654 copies since its debut in Japan. It debuted at #5 in the UK game charts before moving to #3 in the second week after a 34% increase in sales.

The game was met with positive to mixed reception. GameRankings and Metacritic gave it a score of 83.60% and 83 out of 100 for the Wii version; 82.58% and 82 out of 100 for the PlayStation 2 version; 79.74% and 80 out of 100 for the PSP version; 78.50% for the PC version; 75.53% and 76 out of 100 for the Xbox 360 version; 73.46% and 74 out of 100 for the PlayStation 3 version; and 58.57% and 58 out of 100 for the DS version.

It was awarded Best Sports Game for the Wii by IGN, in its 2008 video game awards. It was also nominated for Wii Game of the Year by IGN.
