= World Soccer =

World Soccer may refer to:

- World Soccer (magazine), English language football magazine published by IPC Media
- World Soccer, a 1987 video game for the Master System
- World Soccer: Winning Eleven, the Japanese title for the 1995 video game Goal Storm

== See also ==
- Geography of association football, a listing of all international teams
