= ISS Pro Evolution =

1999 video game

- Developer: Konami Computer Entertainment Tokyo
- Publisher: Konami
- Composers: Shinji Enomoto; Kosuke Soeda; Akira Yamaoka; Hideki Kasai
- Series: International Superstar Soccer; Winning Eleven
- Platform: PlayStation
- Release: JP: September 2, 1999; UK: February 25, 2000; NA: June 6, 2000
- Genre: Sports
- Modes: Single player, multiplayer

ISS Pro Evolution (Note: Known as World Soccer: Jikkyou Winning Eleven 4 (ワールドサッカー：実況ウイニングイレブン4, Wārudosakkā: Jikkyō uininguirebun 4) in Japan) is the third video game in the ISS Pro series, developed exclusively for the PlayStation by Konami Computer Entertainment Tokyo, a division of Konami.

== Content ==
The number of international teams has been increased from the previous release. The teams are still not licensed, although they have their original home, away and goalkeeper kits with emblems and logos resembling their official emblems. However, like in ISS Pro 98, player names are misspelled, but most of them sound right while being pronounced, such as Nigel Martyn being known in the game as "Martin" (the unlicensed name has the same pronunciation as the real name). Each team consists of 22 players.

In ISS Pro Evolution, for the very first time in the series club teams have been included (there are 16 clubs featured in the game, such as FC Barcelona) along with national teams; however, they could only be played in the new mode Master League, unless the player has exported the team on the memory card. Club teams are named with their respective city names in reference to their real-life equivalents, such as "London" and "Amsterdam" for Arsenal and Ajax, respectively. Just like national teams, club teams consist of 22 players. The line-ups reflect the actual squads of the 1998/1999 season, as well as the uniforms.

The 10 different stadiums included in ISS Pro Evolution are no longer generic stadiums named in letters order like in previous versions (although there is an imitation of the old Wembley Stadium in ISS Pro 98). The stadiums' fictional names stand for their real-life equivalents; for example, Old Trafford appears as "Trad Brick Stadium".

== Master League ==
Master League match between Barcelona and Torino

One of the main new features of ISS Pro Evolution is a new game mode named the Master League. The Master League is an exclusive league consisting of 16 club teams included in the game reflecting the best European clubs of that time. Regardless which team you choose to play its squad will be replaced with generic squad consisting of fictional players. The idea of the Master League, beside winning the whole competition, is to complete a squad with real players on terms of transfers. The transfers are based on exchanging players for points you gain according to your match record, which is calculated accordingly to the results achieved - a victory equals 8 points and a draw gains 4 points. Bonus points depending on the goal difference at the end of the match are added to the total point score as well (the bonus is adjusted to the difficulty of the Master League thus goal difference on the hard difficulty level is multiplied by 2). Upon completion of the Master League, due to the lack of different divisions, clubs are not promoted or relegated, regardless of their finishing position. Instead, the Master League begins from the start, and all players acquired from transfers are kept in the player's squad, and the player can continue playing the Master League to eventually buy more players with their acquired points until the player has finally created their desired squad, since the Master League never actually finishes and always loops after all matches have been played. The player's squad can be exported outside of the Master League for use in other game modes such as the Training Mode and Exhibition matches.

The Master League game mode is present in every subsequent version in the ISS and PES series. In successive versions of the series, throughout many modifications and improvements, the later versions of the Master League differ a lot from the original Master League used in ISS Pro Evolution, since the newer PES games are an emulation of a whole season with promotions and relegations being added due to new divisions, rather than having only one division.

== Reception ==
Reception

Aggregate scores
Aggregator	Score
GameRankings	73%
Metacritic	94/100

Review scores
Publication	Score
Computer and Video Games	5/5
Famitsu	31/40
IGN	5.1/10
Official U.S. PlayStation Magazine	9/10

- "The best football game ever made", 5/5, Computer and Video Games Magazine
- "Breath-taking in every aspect", 9/10, Official PlayStation Magazine
- "The best football game we have ever seen", 97%, Play Magazine
- "ISS is an utterly brilliant game!", 98%, PlayStation Power Magazine

Besides many flattering reviews, the game also won the ECTS Interactive Entertainment Award in 1999.

== See also ==
- ESPN MLS GameNight
- International Superstar Soccer Pro
- International Superstar Soccer Pro 98
- International Superstar Soccer series
- Winning Eleven
