= J.League Winning Eleven 2008 Club Championship =

2008 video game

J-League Winning Eleven 2008 Club Championship
- Cover art
- Developer(s): Konami
- Publisher(s): Konami
- Series: Winning Eleven Series
- Platform(s): PlayStation 2
- Release: JP: August 21, 2008
- Genre(s): Sports game
- Mode(s): Single-player, multiplayer

J-League Winning Eleven 2008 Club Championship is the latest edition to the Winning Eleven J-League series. This game is an update to the J-League Winning Eleven 2007 Club Championship and the game was only released in Japan. The game only features club teams and include all teams from J-League.
