= Pro Evolution Soccer Management =

2006 video game

- Developer: Konami
- Publisher: Konami
- Series: Pro Evolution Soccer
- Platform: PlayStation 2
- Release: EU: March 24, 2006
- Genres: Sports, business simulation
- Modes: Single player, Multiplayer

Pro Evolution Soccer Management (also known as PESM or PES Manager/Management) is a football management game released exclusively in Europe on March 24, 2006. It is the third football management game in the Pro Evolution Soccer series, following the Japan only releases of Winning Eleven Tactics: J-League and Winning Eleven Tactics: European Club Soccer.

== Gameplay ==
The game is based around the 2005–06 footballing season. At the start of the game, you are asked to select the club you want to manage. You have a selection of 114 clubs, ranging from 6 different leagues to choose from. These are:

- Premier League of England.
- La Liga of Spain.
- Serie A of Italy.
- Bundesliga of Germany.
- Ligue 1 of France.
- Eredivisie of the Netherlands.

Every time a match is completed, Glory Points are earned. Glory Points can be spent within the game to unlock certain players, extra features, etc. When a certain total is reached, you can apply to manage at a new club (the better the club, the more Glory Points you need). As you stay at a club for longer, you will earn more Glory Points.

Matches are realised using the Pro Evolution Soccer 5 engine, and features commentary from Trevor Brooking and Clive Tyldesley. While not all teams are licensed (Liverpool are named Merseyside Red, for example), players are able to edit teams and players or import save data from Pro Evolution Soccer 5.

== Reception ==
The game received fairly negative reviews, with critics pointing to the awkward interface and lack of official league and team licences and comparing the title unfavourably to other management simulation series such as LMA Manager and Championship Manager. Several team managers and team names are incorrect.
