= J.League Winning Eleven 2010 Club Championship =

2010 video game

J-League Winning Eleven 2010 Club Championship
- Cover art
- Developer(s): Konami
- Publisher(s): Konami
- Series: J. League Winning Eleven
- Platform(s): PlayStation 2
- Release: JP: August 5, 2010
- Genre(s): Traditional soccer simulation
- Mode(s): Single-player, multiplayer

J-League Winning Eleven 2010 Club Championship is an addition to the Winning Eleven J-League series. This game is the successor to the J-League Winning Eleven 2009 Club Championship and was released exclusively in Japan August 5, 2010. It features an updated engine from PES 2010. This game will become the last edition of J-League Winning Eleven series.

== Teams ==
The game features club teams from the 2010 campaign of both J. League tiers totalling 36 teams. The game also features 118 foreign teams from the Premier League, Ligue 1, Serie A, Eredivisie, Primera División and a selection of teams from other leagues.

== Stadiums ==
J. League One

- (Japan) Ajinomoto Stadium
- (Japan) Hiratsuka Stadium
- (Japan) Hiroshima Big Arch
- (Japan) International Stadium Yokohama
- (Japan) Júbilo Iwata Stadium
- (Japan) Kashima Soccer Stadium
- (Japan) Kawasaki Todoroki Stadium
- (Japan) Kobe Wing Stadium
- (Japan) Mizuho Stadium
- (Japan) Nagai Stadium
- (Japan) Niigata Stadium
- (Japan) Nihondaira Sports Stadium
- (Japan) Osaka Expo '70 Stadium
- (Japan) Saitama Stadium 2002
- (Japan) Takebishi Stadium Kyoto
- (Japan) Yamagata Park Stadium
- (Japan) Yurtec Stadium Sendai

J. League Two

- (Japan) Ajinomoto Stadium
- (Japan) Ehime Matsuyama Athletic Stadium
- (Japan) Fukuda Denshi Arena
- (Japan) Gunma Shikishima Athletic Stadium
- (Japan) Hakatanomori Football Stadium
- (Japan) Hitachi Kashiwa Stadium
- (Japan) Kose Sports Park Stadium
- (Japan) Oita Stadium
- (Japan) Sapporo Dome
- (Japan) Tokushima Naruto Stadium
- (Japan) Tosu Stadium
- (Japan) Yokohama Mitsuzawa Football Stadium

Others

- (Argentina) La Bombonera
- (England) Anfield
- (England) Highbury Stadium
- (England) Old Trafford
- (England) St. James' Park
- (Spain) Camp Nou
- (Spain) Estadio Riazor
- (Spain) Mestalla
- (Spain) Santiago Bernabéu Stadium
- (France) Parc des Princes
- (France) Stade Louis II
- (France) Stade Vélodrome
- (Germany) Olympiastadion Berlin
- (Germany) Westfalenstadion
- (Italy) San Siro
- (Italy) Stadio Delle Alpi
- (Italy) Stadio Ennio Tardini
- (Italy) Stadio Olimpico
- (Japan) Kasamatsu Stadium
- (Japan) Kobe Universiade Memorial Stadium
- (Japan) National Stadium
- (Japan) Saitama Urawa Komaba Stadium
- (South Korea) Busan Asiad Main Stadium
- (South Korea) Sangam Stadium
- (Netherlands) Amsterdam Arena
- (Netherlands) De Kuip
- (South Africa) Newlands Stadium
- (Sweden) Råsunda Stadium

PES Originals

- Amerigo Atlantis
- Blautraum Stadion
- Cuito Cuanavala
- Minato Stadium
