= Pro Evolution Soccer (video game) =

2001 video game

- PlayStation 2 cover art for the game
- Developer: Konami Computer Entertainment Tokyo
- Publisher: Konami
- Composers: Michiru Yamane; Norikazu Miura
- Series: Pro Evolution Soccer
- Platforms: PlayStation 2, PlayStation
- Release: PlayStation 2: JP: March 15, 2001; EU: November 23, 2001; PlayStation: EU: February 15, 2002
- Genre: Sports game
- Modes: Single-player, Multiplayer

Pro Evolution Soccer, often abbreviated as PES and also known as World Soccer: Winning Eleven 5 (Japanese: ワールドサッカー: ウイニングイレブン 5, Hepburn: Wārudosakkā: Uininguirebun 5) in Japan, is a football sports simulation video game released in 2001. It is the first installment of Konami's Pro Evolution Soccer series.

World Soccer: Winning Eleven 5 Final Evolution was also released in Japan after the release of Pro Evolution Soccer in Europe. PES was succeeded by Pro Evolution Soccer 2, which was released in 2002.

The cover of the Japanese version of the game featured Shunsuke Nakamura.

== In-game content ==
In the English version of the game, Chris James and Terry Butcher provide commentary on the matches, while in the Japanese version the commentators are Jon Kabira and Katsuyoshi Shinto.

== Reception ==
Reception

Aggregate scores
Aggregator	Score
GameRankings	91.69/100
Metacritic	93/100

Review scores
Publication	Score
Computer and Video Games	9/10
Edge	9/10
Eurogamer	9/10
Famitsu	34/40 (F. Evo.) 33/40
PSM3	95%
BBC Sport	95%
FHM	5/5
PSW	9/10

Metacritic, which assigns a normalised rating in the 0–100 range, calculated an average score of 93 out of 100 ("Universal acclaim/Must-Play") for the PlayStation 2 version. Japanese gaming magazine Famicom Tsūshin scored both the original and J.League versions a score of 34 out of 40 (85 out of 100 for online version), while the Final Evolution version received a lower score (33 out of 40 printed, 83 out of 100 online), all on the same console version.

According to Famicom Tsūshin, Winning Eleven 5 for the PlayStation 2 sold a total of 505,694 copies, the Final Evolution version sold 315,732 copies, while the J.League versions sold 77,225 copies by the end of 2001. In Europe, the game grossed €21 million or $19,000,000 (equivalent to $35,000,000 in 2025) in 2001. In the United Kingdom, the PlayStation 2 version of Pro Evolution Soccer received a "Gold" sales award from the Entertainment and Leisure Software Publishers Association (ELSPA), indicating sales of at least 200,000 copies in the United Kingdom. Pro Evolution Soccer was the 26th best-selling game of 2001 in the United Kingdom.
