= Goal Storm =

1995 video game

- Developer: Konami Computer Entertainment Tokyo
- Publisher: Konami
- Series: Winning Eleven
- Platform: PlayStation
- Release: December 22, 1995: NA: December 22, 1995; EU: January 15, 1996; JP: March 15, 1996
- Genre: Sports
- Modes: Single-player, multiplayer

Goal Storm (Note: Known as World Soccer: Winning Eleven (Japanese: ワールドサッカー ウイニングイレブン, Hepburn: Wārudosakkā uininguirebun) in Japan) is a football sports video game developed by Konami Computer Entertainment Tokyo and published by Konami. It was released in late 1995 in North America and in early 1996 elsewhere for the PlayStation. It is the first installment of the Winning Eleven franchise, later known as Pro Evolution Soccer internationally. Gameplay-wise, the player controls one of thirty six national teams over two different game modes, which both simulate association football matches and/or tournaments.

Goal Storm was well-received critically. A Sega Saturn version was also announced for North America, but it was never released. The sequel International Superstar Soccer Pro, known as World Soccer: Winning Eleven '97 in Japan and Goal Storm '97 in North America, was released in 1997 for the PlayStation.

== Gameplay ==
The game modes available are: Hyper Cup Mode, Exhibition Mode, Key Configuration and Options mode; it is possible to change the difficulty level and the conditions of the playfield. The game has 26 National teams to play. Critics generally praised the game for its smooth polygonal graphics and intuitive controls.

== Reception ==
Reception

Review scores
Publication	Score
Electronic Gaming Monthly	17.5/20; 18/20
GamePro	16/20
Next Generation	4/5
Maximum	2/5

A reviewer for Next Generation was mostly pleased with the smooth polygonal players graphics, the intuitive control, and the announcer, though he noted that the animation is somewhat sluggish and the use of the same button for both defensive tackles and offensive goal shots results in players kicking the ball away as soon as they gain possession until they get the hang of the game. He concluded that "Goal Storm is slower and oddly less involving than FIFA, but only slightly, and it's easily the best soccer game for PlayStation - OK, it's the only one, but it's still going to be tough to beat." The sports reviewers of Electronic Gaming Monthly expressed strong approval for the polygonal players, the opponent AI, the camera angles, and the interface, which they said is "so user-friendly that an instruction manual isn't needed." GamePro also praised these elements, particularly the handling of the polygonal graphics, and summarized that the game "plays as well as FIFA, but looks more realistic."

Next Generation reviewed the game and stated that "The interchangeable camera views, extensive replay features, and realistic gameplay are some of the other impressive factors that go into making this one of the finest soccer games to date." Maximum commented that "Goal Storm seems to have it all: huge polygon players, replays from every conceivable viewpoint, and an array of bicycle kicks and diving headers. Sadly, it also has a simple way of scoring virtually every time and extremely limited playability." They elaborated that the player can score repeated goals by performing a bicycle kick or header from the penalty area, since the goalie never stops such shots.

== Legacy ==
A special time attack mode event called Time Leap Trials would be added in eFootball from June 26, 2025 as a part of the 30th Anniversary of Pro Evolution Soccer series. This event remade the stadium and players model of Goal Storm under the latest engine of eFootball, Unreal Engine 4.

== See also ==
- eFootball PES
- FIFA Soccer 96
