= J.League Jikkyou Winning Eleven =

1995 video game

J-League Jikkyō Winning Eleven
- Developer: Konami
- Publisher: Konami
- Series: J. League Jikkyō Winning Eleven
- Platform: PlayStation
- Release: JP: July 21, 1995
- Genre: Traditional soccer simulation
- Modes: Single-player, multiplayer

J-League Jikkyō Winning Eleven (Jリーグ 実況ウイニングイレブン) is a 1995 Japan-exclusive soccer simulation video game, which was developed and published by Konami for the PlayStation. It's an official J-League licensed game.

== Gameplay ==
The intro of the game features a Soccer Stadium floating in the sky, then a footballer that performs a free kick.

There are six modes available from the main menu: Exhibition, Master Championship, Hyper Cup, All Stars Exhibition, Options Mode and Player Mode. In the option Mode you can set the time limit, the ground conditions, the CPU level, and the sound options.

In the "Player Mode" are shown players photos and statistics, this mode features a background female Japanese voiced music.

The graphic is fully 3D rendered. The button configuration is the following: shoot, pass, cross, run, tackle; you can substitute players by pressing the Start button.

When a player scores a goal, a replay with a close-up camera angle is shown. The game HUD features portraits of the players at the bottom of the screen. The audio during a match features background music, crowd sound effects and ingame Japanese commentary.
