= J.League Jikkyou Winning Eleven '97 =

1996 video game

- Cover art featuring Masayuki Okano and Kazuyoshi Miura
- Developer(s): Konami
- Publisher(s): Konami
- Series: J.League Jikkyou Winning Eleven
- Platform(s): PlayStation
- Release: JP: November 22, 1996
- Genre(s): Traditional soccer simulation
- Mode(s): Single-player, multiplayer

J.League Jikkyō Winning Eleven '97 (Jリーグ 実況ウイニングイレブン'97), also known as World Soccer Winning Eleven 2, is a 1996 Japan-exclusive association football simulation sports video game, which was developed and published by Konami for the PlayStation. Updated international versions of the game were released as International Superstar Soccer Pro (ISS Pro) and International Superstar Soccer 64 (ISS 64).

== Summary ==
An all-star match. Jorginho, the MVP of the 1996 season, is visible.

The late Naoki Matsuda in the players' profile section.

The title was based on the 1996 J.League, being published on November 22, almost two weeks later after the end of that season. At the time of its release, J.League Jikkyou Winning Eleven '97 was considered to be the most realistic football video game on any other console. It featured narration by Jon Kabira and commentary by Yasutaro Matsuki, a former footballer and manager.

The 1996 season can be included in the "Golden Age", as back then, J.League was at its popularity peak, with many star players known the world over: Guido Buchwald, Uwe Bein, Dragan Stojković, Daniele Massaro, Salvatore Schillaci, Basile Boli, Ivan Hašek, Jorginho, Zinho, Dunga, Edílson, Mazinho Oliveira, Careca, Evair, César Sampaio, Antônio Carlos Zago, Ruy Ramos, Masashi Nakayama, Hiroshi Nanami, Hidetoshi Nakata, among many others.

Both the play-styles and league format (double stage with Victory Goal and Final match at the end) were very characteristic and promoted overly offensive, stylish and spectacular football.

Up to two players can compete in a series of games that include: Exhibition, full J.League season, Hyper Cup, All-Star Match and Penalty Shootout modes. It is also possible to view the players' profile.

== See also ==
- World Soccer Winning Eleven '97 (National teams edition, known in North America as Goal Storm 97 and in Europe as International Superstar Soccer Pro)
