= Pro Evolution Soccer 2 =

2002 video game

- European PlayStation 2 cover art
- Developer: Konami Computer Entertainment Tokyo
- Publisher: Konami
- Composers: Michiru Yamane; Sota Fujimori
- Series: Pro Evolution Soccer
- Platforms: PlayStation; PlayStation 2; GameCube
- Release: PlayStation 2: JP: April 25, 2002; EU: October 25, 2002; JP: December 12, 2002 (Final Evolution); NA: March 11, 2003; EU: April 11, 2003 (Platinum); PlayStation: JP: April 25, 2002; EU: October 25, 2002; GameCube: JP: January 30, 2003 (Final Evolution)
- Genre: Sports
- Modes: Single-player, multiplayer

Pro Evolution Soccer 2 (abbreviated as PES 2), also known as World Soccer: Winning Eleven 6 outside of Europe, (Note: Known as World Soccer: Winning Eleven 6 or World Soccer: Winning Eleven 2002 in Japan, and as World Soccer: Winning Eleven 6 International in North America.) is the second installment of Konami's Pro Evolution Soccer football simulation video game series. The Japanese release was succeeded by an updated and improved version called World Soccer: Winning Eleven 6 Final Evolution.

It was the last game in the series to be released for the PlayStation and the first and only game to be released for the GameCube, though it was the Japan-exclusive Final Evolution update.

The cover of the Japanese version of the game featured Masashi Nakayama.

PES 2 was succeeded by PES 3, which was released in 2003.

== In-game content ==
PES 2 features six game modes, including single matches, training, various cup tournaments, and a Master League, in which the player can select a team to compete in various competitions and partake in the transfer market. A total of 40 unlicensed club teams and 56 unlicensed international squads (expect for Japan which is the only fully licensed team in the game) are available.

Peter Brackley and Trevor Brooking call the matches in the game's English language version replacing Pro Evolution Soccer commentators Chris James and Terry Butcher. The commentators in the Japanese version are Jon Kabira and Tetsuo Nakanishi.

The opening theme for the game is "We Will Rock You" by Queen. This opening theme is also featured in Pro Evolution Soccer 2016.

== Reception ==
Reception

Aggregate score
Aggregator	Score
Metacritic	(EU) 93/100 (US) 93/100

Review scores
Publication	Score
AllGame	4.5/5
Edge	9/10
Electronic Gaming Monthly	9/10
Eurogamer	9/10
Famitsu	36/40 (J.League) 34/40
Game Informer	9/10
GamePro	5/5
GameRevolution	4/5
GameSpot	9/10
GameSpy	4.5/5
GameZone	8.5/10
IGN	9/10
Official U.S. PlayStation Magazine	5/5
BBC Sport	90%
The Village Voice	8/10

The PlayStation 2 version received "universal acclaim" in both regions according to video game review aggregator Metacritic. In Japan, Famitsu gave both the original and Final Evolution versions a score of 36 out of 40, and the J.League version 34 out of 40, all for the same console version.

In Japan, Winning Eleven 6 sold 1 million units in eight weeks. By December 2002, Winning Eleven 6 had sold 1,115,707 units and Final Evolution sold 406,234 units for a combined 1,521,941 units sold. In total, the game sold a total of 1,799,075 for the PlayStation 2 in Japan.

In Europe, PES 2 initially outsold FIFA Football 2003 upon release in October 2002, with PES 2 selling above 1 million units in its first 40 days of availability in Europe. In the United Kingdom, it topped the all-formats chart two days after release. The PlayStation 2 version of Pro Evolution Soccer 2 received a "Platinum" sales award from the Entertainment and Leisure Software Publishers Association (ELSPA), indicating sales of at least 300,000 copies in the United Kingdom. By December 2002, FIFA 2003 had overtaken PES 2 in Europe with 2.5 million sales in the region.

In the United States, Winning Eleven 6 sold 59,567 copies. In total, PES 2 sold at least more than 2,858,642 units worldwide.

PES 2 was awarded Best Console Game at the European Computer Trade Show (ECTS) in 2002. During the 7th Annual Interactive Achievement Awards, the Academy of Interactive Arts & Sciences nominated Pro Evolution Soccer 2 for "Console Sports Simulation Game of the Year", which was ultimately awarded to Madden NFL 2004.

According to SPORTbible in 2019, Pro Evolution Soccer 2 was voted the greatest football video game of all time in a poll. SPORTbible writer Jack Kenmare called it "one of the greatest and most influential football games in recent memory."
