= J.League Jikkyō Winning Eleven 2001 =

2001 video game

J-League Jikkyō Winning Eleven 2001
- Cover art featuring Shunsuke Nakamura, Mitsuo Ogasawara and Atsuhiro Miura
- Developer: Konami
- Publisher: Konami
- Series: Winning Eleven Series
- Platform: PlayStation
- Release: JP: June 21, 2001
- Genre: Traditional soccer simulation
- Modes: Single-player, multiplayer

J-League Jikkyō Winning Eleven 2001 (known as World Soccer: Winning Eleven 4) is a sports video game developed by Konami for the PlayStation exclusively in Japan in June 2001. It is an addition to the Winning Eleven J-League series, and the successor to J-League Winning Eleven 2000. The game only features club teams (no national teams) and teams from both tiers of the J. League totalling 28 teams. The game also features seven unlockable European teams (Real Madrid, Barcelona, Manchester United, Arsenal, Juventus, Roma, and Milan). The game uses the Winning Eleven 2000 engine.
