= Pro Evolution Soccer 2009 =

2008 video game

- Cover art featuring FC Barcelona's Lionel Messi
- Developer: Konami
- Publisher: Konami
- Series: Pro Evolution Soccer
- Platforms: Microsoft Windows; PlayStation 2 PlayStation 3 PlayStation Portable; Xbox 360; Wii
- Release: October 17, 2008: PlayStation 3, Windows & Xbox 360; EU: October 17, 2008; AU: October 30, 2008; NA: November 11, 2008 (X360); NA: November 12, 2008 (PC); JP: November 27, 2008 (PS3, X360); NA: March 17, 2009 (PS3) PlayStation 2 & PlayStation Portable; EU: October 31, 2008 (PS2); EU: November 7, 2008 (PSP); NA: November 11, 2008; AU: November 13, 2008 (PS2); AU: November 20, 2008 (PSP); JP: January 29, 2009 Wii; NA: March 17, 2009; EU: March 27, 2009; AU: April 2, 2009; JP: May 14, 2009
- Genre: Sports
- Modes: Single-player, multiplayer

Pro Evolution Soccer 2009 (PES 2009, known as World Soccer: Winning Eleven 2009 in Korea and Japan) is a football video game in the Pro Evolution Soccer series, which was made by Konami. It is also the exclusive licensed game of the UEFA Champions League. The Wii version is known as Winning Eleven Play Maker 2009 in Japan. PES 2009 was succeeded by Pro Evolution Soccer 2010.

== Gameplay ==
Gameplay has been changed from previous versions for Pro Evolution Soccer 2009, with key additions to the Teamvision system, tactics changing according to situation, off-the-ball fluency, and AI recognizing strategies that works accumulating data on an ongoing basis within Master League and League modes. Another new addition is the readjustments for ball movements, with new air resistance calculations for the trajectory of the ball. There are also new friction routines to affect ball movement in terms of ground conditions, backspin routines are calculated so that ball slows accordingly, and the bounce of the ball can be used more effectively: players can flick the ball up to tee a shot, or to lift it over a defender's trailing leg. If a player has the ability, they will be able to perform skilful turns. PES 2009 also features a new game mode called 'Become A Legend', much like 'Be a Pro' from the EA Sports FIFA Series. This mode was originally only in the Japanese versions by the name of Fantasista, it was released as a special edition for J-League Winning Eleven 2007 Club Championship.

== Licences ==
For the first time Konami was able to acquire the rights for the UEFA Champions League. Manchester United and Liverpool are the only fully licensed clubs from the Premier League, which is integrated but unlicensed just as in the previous releases. Since the UEFA Champions League license does not include the rights of all participating clubs and a number of licenses were held exclusively by EA Sports too, not all participating clubs are licensed or even in the game.

Unlicensed clubs have real player names but use fictional club names, badges, and kits. These can be edited by the user.

There is also a separate league with 18 generic teams (Team A, Team B, etc.), which can be edited fully, as in the previous versions. This feature does not appear in the PS2 version of the game and the PSP version only has two teams in this extra league.

== Cover ==
Lionel Messi and Andrés Guardado appear as the cover athletes of PES 2009. As part of the new agreement, Messi is featured on the cover of all versions of PES 2009, and also appears in promotional materials for the game.

== Wii version ==
Pro Evolution Soccer 2009 is the second Wii entry of the association football video game Pro Evolution Soccer series by Konami. The Wii version was released in March 2009.

Building on the control system of its predecessor, PES 2009 expands on the basic concept of players controlling both the player with the ball and those around them.

PES 2009 for Nintendo Wii features a number of key additions, with an enhanced shooting system offering more control. The development team has also reworked the defensive elements of the game, with more control over defenders and more ways to close down attacking threats. A new AI system has also been implemented and results in more sophisticated and intuitive movement from teammates according to the player's commands. A new cooperative play system was designed to allow one player to use the Nunchuk and the Wii Remote to control the game at a team level while another player uses the Classic Controller to coordinate individual players. It is also set to receive fresh game modes, like the Master League, an enhanced Champions Road competition, an enhanced Edit Mode, enhanced online gameplay possibilities and a game mode allowing players to train their Mii.

== Demo ==
A playable demo became available for PlayStation 3, Xbox 360 and PC on October 2, 2008. Players are able to select from Manchester United, Liverpool, Real Madrid, FC Barcelona, Italy, or France for a full five-minute exhibition match with a multi-player option.

The demo also includes promotional videos detailing the new game's "Become a Legend" and online "Legends" modes, which see the player controlling just one player within a team and attempting to forge a career in football. Starting as a promising 17-year-old, players must force their way into the first team and produce a series of blistering performances which will ultimately result to a move to one of Europe's biggest sides. Or, on the flip side, poor performances can see a player struggling in the lower leagues and eventually being released.

== Association with Setanta Sports ==
In late September 2008, it was announced that PES 2009 would have Setanta Sports branding.

The link was confirmed when Setanta Sports put logos on their website announcing they were, indeed, in association with the game.

== Commentators ==
- Jon Champion and Mark Lawrenson provide the English commentary.
- Jon Kabira, Tsuyoshi Kitazawa and Masahiro Fukuda provide the Japanese commentary, with Florent Dabadie as pitch reporter.
- Wolff-Christoph Fuss and Hansi Küpper provide the German commentary.
- Christian Jeanpierre and Laurent Paganelli provide the French Commentary.
- Juan Carlos Rivero and Julio Maldonado "Maldini" provide the Spanish commentary for Spain.
- Pierluigi Pardo and José Altafini provide the Italian commentary.
- Christian Martinoli and Luis García provide the Spanish commentary for Latin America.

== Reception ==
Reception

Aggregate scores
Aggregator	Score					
Aggregator	PC	PS2	PS3	PSP	Wii	Xbox 360
GameRankings	76.62%	68.67%	77.27%	77.20%	85.46%	73.54%
Metacritic	79/100	72/100	77/100	75/100	84/100	74/100

Review scores
Publication	Score					
Publication	PC	PS2	PS3	PSP	Wii	Xbox 360
Eurogamer	N/A	N/A	N/A	N/A	8/10	7/10
Famitsu	N/A	N/A	N/A	31/40	N/A	N/A
Game Informer	N/A	N/A	8.5/10	N/A	N/A	8.5/10
GamePro	N/A	N/A	N/A	N/A	4/5	N/A
GameRevolution	N/A	N/A	C+	N/A	N/A	N/A
GameSpot	N/A	N/A	7/10	6.5/10	8/10	7/10
GameTrailers	N/A	N/A	7.6/10	N/A	9/10	7.6/10
GameZone	N/A	N/A	N/A	N/A	N/A	7/10
IGN	N/A	6.8/10	(UK) 8.5/10 (US) 7.2/10	7/10	8.5/10	(UK) 8.5/10 (US) 7.2/10
Official Xbox Magazine (US)	N/A	N/A	N/A	N/A	N/A	6/10
PC Gamer (UK)	87%	N/A	N/A	N/A	N/A	N/A
PlayStation: The Official Magazine	N/A	N/A	4.5/5	N/A	N/A	N/A
411Mania	N/A	N/A	N/A	N/A	8/10	N/A

The game was met with positive to average reception. GameRankings and Metacritic gave it a score of 85.46% and 84 out of 100 for the Wii version; 77.27% and 77 out of 100 for the PlayStation 3 version; 77.20% and 75 out of 100 for the PSP version; 76.62% and 79 out of 100 for the PC version; 73.54% and 74 out of 100 for the Xbox 360 version; and 68.67% and 72 out of 100 for the PlayStation 2 version.

The PS2 version was the 100th best-selling game in Japan in 2008, which sold 135,128 copies, with total lifetime sales of 680,152; while the PS3 version was the 32nd best-selling game that year, which sold 297,896 copies.
