= Pro Evolution Soccer 3 =

2003 video game

- European PlayStation 2 cover art featuring referee Pierluigi Collina
- Developer: Konami Computer Entertainment Tokyo
- Publisher: Konami
- Composer: Norikazu Miura
- Series: Pro Evolution Soccer
- Platforms: PlayStation 2, Microsoft Windows
- Release: PlayStation 2 Original version: JP: August 7, 2003; International: EU: October 17, 2003; NA: February 17, 2004; JP: February 19, 2004; Microsoft Windows; Original version: NA: October 17, 2003; EU: February 17, 2004; JP: February 19, 2004; International: EU: November 21, 2003; KOR: March 25, 2004; NA: April 9, 2004
- Genre: Sports
- Modes: Single-player, multiplayer

Pro Evolution Soccer 3 (known as World Soccer: Winning Eleven 7 in Japan and World Soccer: Winning Eleven 7 International in North America) is a football simulation video game developed and produced by Konami as part of the Pro Evolution Soccer series. Initially released for the PlayStation 2, it is also the first in the series to be released on Microsoft Windows.

While the Japanese version featured Japanese national team coach Zico, the European version cover features the image and signature of iconic Italian referee Pierluigi Collina, who had previously officiated the 2002 FIFA World Cup Final. This was unusual, as football games had come to almost exclusively feature only players and managers on their covers; plus, referees only appear in cutscenes in this game (they would only be integrated to the playing field in the next entry of the series) and Collina didn't feature in the game at all. PES 3 was succeeded by Pro Evolution Soccer 4, which was released in 2004.

== New features ==
- New graphics engine.
- Improved gameplay, control, ball physics, animation and AI.
- New Shop mode, where points can be traded in for hidden items.
- Master League expanded to four divisions, with tons of new players.
- Support for 1–4 players (multitap required for 3 or 4 players).

== Licenses ==
The game does not include any full leagues but 64 clubs from various European countries. 6 clubs are fully licensed, which are the five Italian Serie A clubs Milan, Roma, Juventus, Lazio and Parma, as well as Feyenoord from the Dutch Eredivisie. All other clubs have fictional team names, logos and jerseys. Also player names are fictional, but only if the player is part of an unlicensed national team. Noticeable cases are for example Dutch players (e.g. Von Mistelroum instead of Ruud van Nistelrooy) and German players (e.g. Kalm instead of Oliver Kahn).

Like other Winning Eleven video games before, the J.League license was limited in Japan.

== Reception ==
Reception

Aggregate scores
Aggregator	Score	
Aggregator	PC	PS2
GameRankings	(US) 93% (EU) 89%	(EU) 94% (US) 93%
Metacritic	(US) 92/100 (EU) 86/100	(US) 93/100 (EU) 92/100

Review scores
Publication	Score	
Publication	PC	PS2
Edge	N/A	9/10
Electronic Gaming Monthly	N/A	8.83/10
Eurogamer	8/10	(EU) 10/10 (JP) 9/10
Game Informer	N/A	9.25/10
GamePro	N/A	5/5
GameSpot	9.1/10	9.1/10
GameSpy	N/A	4.5/5
GameZone	9.4/10	9.4/10
IGN	N/A	9.1/10
Official U.S. PlayStation Magazine	N/A	5/5
BBC Sport	90%	90%

In Europe, Pro Evolution Soccer 3 sold 1 million copies on its first day of release, setting a launch sales record. The PlayStation 2 version of Pro Evolution Soccer 3 had surpassed 1 million units sold by November 2003. It was a significant hit in Italy, which purchased more than 200,000 units in under one month, for revenues of €8 million or $9,000,000 (equivalent to $16,000,000 in 2025). The PS2 version went on to sell 1.16 million units in Japan and 1.55 million units in Europe for a combined 2.71 million by the end of 2003. The PlayStation 2 version of Pro Evolution Soccer 3 received a "Platinum" sales award from the Entertainment and Leisure Software Publishers Association (ELSPA), indicating sales of at least 300,000 copies in the United Kingdom. In the United States, it sold 33,403 units by January 2005, adding up to at least 2,743,403 units sold worldwide.

The "International" version of World Soccer: Winning Eleven 7 received "universal acclaim" for both platforms in all regions except the European PC version, which received "favorable" reviews, according to video game review aggregator Metacritic. It received a runner-up position in GameSpot's 2004 "Best Traditional Sports Game" award category across all platforms, losing to ESPN NFL 2K5. During the 8th Annual Interactive Achievement Awards, the Academy of Interactive Arts & Sciences nominated Pro Evolution Soccer 3 for "Console Sports Simulation Game of the Year", which was ultimately awarded to ESPN NFL 2K5.
