= International Superstar Soccer Pro 98 =

1997 video game

- North American cover art featuring Carlos Valderrama
- Developer: Konami Computer Entertainment Tokyo
- Publisher: Konami
- Director: Shingo Takatsuka
- Producer: Kazuhisa Hashimoto
- Composers: Shinji Enomoto; Kosuke Soeda; Nobuhiko Matsufuji; Hideki Kasai; Akira Yamaoka
- Series: International Superstar Soccer; Winning Eleven
- Platform: PlayStation
- Release: J.League Jikkyō Winning Eleven 3: JP: December 11, 1997; International Superstar Soccer Pro 98: JP: May 28, 1998; NA: August 21, 1998; EU: September 1998; JP: November 12, 1998 (Final Ver.)
- Genre: Sports
- Modes: Single-player, multiplayer

International Superstar Soccer Pro 98 (Note: Officially abbreviated as ISS Pro 98, sometimes called International Superstar Soccer '98) (Note: Released in Japan in three editions: J.League Jikkyō Winning Eleven 3 (Jリーグ実況ウイニングイレブン３, J Rīgu Jikkyō Wingu Irebun 3), World Soccer Jikkyō Winning Eleven 3: World Cup France '98 (ワールドサッカー 実況ウイニングイレブン3 〜ワールドカップ フランス'98〜, Wārudo Sakkā Jikkyō Wingu Irebun 3 〜Wārudo Kappu Furansu '98〜) and World Soccer Jikkyō Winning Eleven 3 Final Ver. (ワールドサッカー 実況ウイニングイレブン3 〜Final Ver.〜, Wārudo Sakkā Jikkyō Wingu Irebun 3 〜Final Ver.〜)) is a football video game which follows International Superstar Soccer Pro developed by Konami Computer Entertainment Tokyo. The Japanese version was re-released in late 1998 as Winning Eleven 3: Final Version with some slight improvements, such as a wider camera option. In Japan, a version of the game featuring only J-League clubs was released in December 1998 titled J-League Jikkyō Winning Eleven '98-'99.

The English commentary for the game is provided by Tony Gubba.

Although it lacked FIFPro licence, the European releases featured Italian striker Fabrizio Ravanelli along with German goalkeeper Andreas Koepke (on German, French and Spanish releases) or English midfielder Paul Ince (on British and Italian releases) on the cover, and the North American release featured Colombian player Carlos Valderrama. The game shares the same cover arts and North American release date with the Nintendo 64 game International Superstar Soccer 98 (and Game Boy's International Superstar Soccer) but they are individual iterations of different game franchises, only released with similar name. This is a characteristic also shared with the previous game, ISS Pro.

== Game modes ==
The features six different game modes. Modes existing in previous version have been developed and the two new have been added.

- Exhibition Mode: a friendly match game against computer or another player with a choice of difficulty, stadium, weather and match length and time of a match. It was also possible to play with another player or with computer against computer. Computer versus computer option was available as well.
- League Mode: 16 international teams participate in league playing either half or full season with a free choice of teams.
- Cup Mode: mainly focused on emulation of FIFA World Cup with the real group draw as in the 1998 FIFA World Cup. This mode also included local cups like European Cup, Asian Cup, African Cup, North American Cup and South American Cup, each based on knockout-stage conditions. Konami Cup was the one with the more adjustable settings like the number of teams and tournament basis. It is also possible to try to qualify for the World Cup.
- All Star Match: a friendly match game between the World Stars Players and European Stars Players.
- Penalty Kick Mode: two teams take a five penalty kicks to select the winner. In case of a draw, they undergo sudden death round.
- Training: practice of shooting free kicks and corner kicks with a selected team.

== Teams ==
Although team line-ups were to reflect 1998 FIFA World Cup squads there are some inconsistencies. For example, players named 'Rabanilli' (representing Fabrizio Ravanelli for Italy), 'Romedio' (representing Romario for Brazil), 'Zabie' (representing Zague for Mexico) or 'Ber' (representing Ibrahim Ba for France) did not participate in the final tournament. Some players in the game of both qualified and non-qualified teams had initially retired for their team one year before the 1998 World Cup. For example, Carlos Hermosillo ('Hermoss') of Mexico had retired from international football in 1997.

== Featured teams ==
Europe

- Germany
- Austria
- Belgium
- Bulgaria
- Croatia
- Denmark
- Scotland
- Spain
- France
- Wales
- Greece
- England
- Ireland
- Northern Ireland
- Italy
- Norway
- Netherlands
- Portugal
- Romania
- Sweden
- Turkey
- Yugoslavia (now Serbia)

Africa

- Cameroon
- Morocco
- Nigeria
- Tunisia
- South Africa

South America

- Argentina
- Brazil
- Chile
- Colombia
- Paraguay

North America

- USA
- Jamaica
- Mexico

Asia

- Saudi Arabia
- South Korea
- Iran
- Japan

Oceania

- Australia

Others

- European All-Stars
- World All-Stars

== Winning Eleven 3: Final Ver. ==
The Japanese release, Winning Eleven 3, was re-released in late 1998 as Winning Eleven 3: Final Ver. The major changes and improvements have been focused on graphic and statistical updates rather than on engine itself. The most significant differences from the original are:

- Whole look of the game is less vivid in order to increase the level of realism.
- Some home, away and goalkeepers kits have been updated (including the All Star teams).
- The appearance of goals and nets has been changed.
- Squads have been updated to exactly reflect 1998 FIFA World Cup squads, the number of players in line-ups has been extended to 22 as well.
- Three difficulty levels instead of five: easy, medium and hard.
- The choice of match length has been widen to 30 minutes in spaces of 5.
- Match settings in Exhibition Mode now include the choice of uniforms, extended period, penalty shoot-out and golden goal.
- During the Cup Mode the statistics of scores and assists have been added.
- The imitation of Stade de France, the venue of 1998 FIFA World Cup final, has been added as a new stadium.
- The immediate replays after most interesting moments like missed shots, fouls or offsides have been implemented during the match.
- The most noticeable changes during play covered improved shoot system and added power slide bar during corner kicks.
- A new one-two pass method is added, allowing the first player to pass and run without the second player having to return the ball immediately. This new move added much more variety to the game.

== Konami Code support ==
Every version of ISS Pro 98 / Winning Eleven 3 supports a variation of the Konami Code. When used at the main menu, the player can unlock a special team to be used in Exhibition Matches.

== Reception ==
Reception

Aggregate score
Aggregator	Score
GameRankings	87%

Review scores
Publication	Score
Consoles +	95%
Computer and Video Games	5/5
Electronic Gaming Monthly	8.125/10 (Note: Two critics of Electronic Gaming Monthly gave the game each a score of 8/10, one gave it 9/10, and the other gave it 7.5/10.)
EP Daily	9.5/10
Famitsu	(F.V.) 31/40 (W.S.) 30/40 (J.League) 28/40
Game Informer	8.5/10
Mega Fun	87%
MeriStation	9.3/10
PlayStation Official Magazine – UK	9/10
Official U.S. PlayStation Magazine	4.5/5

The game received favorable reviews according to the review aggregation website GameRankings. In Japan, Famitsu gave it a score of 28 out of 40 for J.League Jikkyō Winning Eleven 3, 30 out of 40 for World Soccer Jikkyō Winning Eleven 3: World Cup France '98, and 31 out of 40 for the latter's Final Version edition. GamePro said, "With their superior all-around package, the FIFA games will still reign supreme for most, but ISS [sic] certainly deserves a look from soccer fans everywhere." (Note: GamePro gave the game 4.5/5 for graphics, 3.5/5 for sound, and two 4/5 scores for control and fun factor.) In December 1998, Arcade called the game the best football game available, preferring it over the Nintendo 64 game.

The game was a bestseller in the UK and Japan.

== See also ==
- International Superstar Soccer Pro
- ISS Series
- Winning Eleven
