= Pro Evolution Soccer 5 =

2005 video game

- European cover art featuring Chelsea's John Terry and Arsenal's Thierry Henry
- Developer: Konami Computer Entertainment Tokyo
- Publisher: Konami
- Series: Pro Evolution Soccer
- Platforms: PlayStation 2, Microsoft Windows, PlayStation Portable, Xbox
- Release: August 4, 2005: PlayStation 2; JP: August 4, 2005; EU: October 21, 2005; NA: February 7, 2006 Windows; JP: August 4, 2005; EU: October 28, 2005; NA: April 28, 2006 PlayStation Portable; JP: September 15, 2005; KOR: October 6, 2005; EU: November 25, 2005; NA: February 7, 2006 Xbox; EU: October 21, 2005; NA: February 7, 2006
- Genres: Sports (football)
- Modes: Single-player, Multiplayer

Pro Evolution Soccer 5 (abbreviated PES 5), known as World Soccer: Winning Eleven 9 in Japan and North America (sometimes mislabeled as World Soccer Winning Eleven 9 International), is a 2005 football sports simulation video game developed and produced by Konami as part of the Pro Evolution Soccer series.

Featuring Arsenal and Chelsea it is the first release of the series which offered fully licensed clubs from the Premier League, which is one of the 3 unlicensed leagues of the game. There are also 3 licensed leagues just like in the predecessor Pro Evolution Soccer 4. The game also includes 3 fully licensed leagues, which are the Spanish Liga Española, the Dutch Eredivisie and the Italian Serie A (with the exception of Cagliari). Like its predecessors, the Japanese J.League license is limited to Japanese version releases.

As with previous versions, the game features an edit mode allowing the player to edit certain elements of the game. It was the last release to feature the German Bundesliga (in the game as German League) before it was replaced by a generic league due to Konami losing the license for subsequent releases.

Pro Evolution Soccer 5 marked the series' first appearance on the PSP. The game was also the first in the series to feature online play for the PlayStation 2 outside of Japan. Within online play, statistics and league points are stored on the server for each game played. These points determine a team's (player's) position within the five online divisions. PES 5 was succeeded by Pro Evolution Soccer 6, which was released in 2006. In line with other online-enabled games on the Xbox, multiplayer on Xbox Live was available to players until 15 April 2010. Pro Evolution Soccer 5 is now playable online again on the replacement Xbox Live servers called Insignia.

The Japanese version features both Zico and Shunsuke Nakamura.

== Reception ==
Reception

Aggregate score
Aggregator	Score			
Aggregator	PC	PS2	PSP	Xbox
Metacritic	(US) 90/100 (EU) 89/100	(EU) 92/100 (US) 89/100	(EU) 79/100 (US) 78/100	(US) 89/100 (EU) 87/100

Review scores
Publication	Score			
Publication	PC	PS2	PSP	Xbox
Electronic Gaming Monthly	N/A	8/10	6.5/10	8/10
Eurogamer	N/A	9/10	8/10	N/A
Game Informer	N/A	8.5/10	7.5/10	8.5/10
GamePro	N/A	4.5/5	N/A	N/A
GameRevolution	N/A	A−	N/A	A−
GameSpot	9.1/10	9.1/10	8.8/10	9.1/10
GameSpy	N/A	4.5/5	4/5	4.5/5
GameZone	N/A	9/10	N/A	9.3/10
IGN	N/A	8.8/10	7.8/10	8.8/10
Official U.S. PlayStation Magazine	N/A	4.5/5	4/5	N/A
Official Xbox Magazine (US)	N/A	N/A	N/A	8.5/10
Detroit Free Press	N/A	N/A	2/4	N/A
USA Today	9.5/10	9.5/10	8.5/10	9.5/10

=== Sales ===
In Japan, Winning Eleven 9 sold 1,125,464 units for the PlayStation 2, making it one of Japan's top five best-selling games of 2005. It went on to sell 1,206,483 units for the PlayStation 2 in Japan. In France, it was the best-selling game of 2005.

In the United Kingdom, the PlayStation 2 version of Pro Evolution Soccer 5 received a "Double Platinum" sales award from the Entertainment and Leisure Software Publishers Association (ELSPA), indicating sales of at least 600,000 copies in the United Kingdom. It sold more than 800,000 copies in the United Kingdom, making it the UK's second best-selling game of 2005 (below rival FIFA 06). This adds up to more than 2,006,483 units sold in Japan and the United Kingdom.

=== Reviews ===
The U.S. PC and European PlayStation 2 versions received "universal acclaim" from critics, while the rest received "generally favorable" reviews on all platforms in both regions according to video game review aggregator Metacritic.

USA Today gave the PS2, Xbox and PC versions a score of nine-and-a-half stars out of ten and said it was "not only the ideal soccer simulation, but perhaps one of the top sports game out there. Accessibility and authentic play will attract both old and new fans alike." However, it gave the PSP version a score of eight-and-a-half stars and said that it "loses a few key features, but retains the fun play and the sport’s overall spirit." The Sydney Morning Herald gave the game four-and-a-half stars out of five and said that the AI "is a harder nut to crack, requiring more thoughtful passing to open up your opponent before you strike. So long as you're thinking like a footballer, you're going to score goals." Maxim also gave it a score of nine out of ten and said that it "returns to the field to affirm its ball-kicking dominance. And thanks to its new online mode, your ears will be ringing 'goooal!' for days." However, Detroit Free Press gave the PSP version a score of two stars out of four and said that "with fewer buttons on the PSP than on a standard console game pad and only one analog stick to play with, the game's hallmark -- its deep, precise controls -- feels a bit muted."
