= ESPN MLS ExtraTime 2002 =

2001 video game

ESPN MLS ExtraTime
- North American cover art for PlayStation 2, featuring Clint Mathis of the NY/NJ MetroStars.
- Developer: KCEA Honolulu Studio
- Publisher: Konami of America
- Director: Shin Kimura
- Programmers: Shin Kimura; Kazuhiko Takata
- Artists: Hitoshi Matsuda; Jun Nakagawa
- Platforms: PlayStation 2, Xbox, GameCube
- Release: PlayStation 2: NA: April 24, 2001; Xbox: NA: March 26, 2002; GameCube: NA: April 3, 2002
- Genre: Sports game
- Modes: Single-player, multiplayer

ESPN MLS ExtraTime is a sports video game released in 2001-2002 by Konami. It is available for PlayStation 2, Xbox, and GameCube. Clint Mathis is on the cover. The original ExtraTime was released for PS2 seven months after ESPN MLS GameNight on the PlayStation, with the GameCube and Xbox versions released in 2002 afterward as ESPN MLS ExtraTime 2002. MLS ExtraTime was the last in the series as the MLS sold its video game license to EA Sports' FIFA series.

== Reception ==
Reception

Aggregate score
Aggregator	Score		
Aggregator	GameCube	PS2	Xbox
Metacritic	68/100	77/100	68/100

Review scores
Publication	Score		
Publication	GameCube	PS2	Xbox
Electronic Gaming Monthly	N/A	5.67/10 (Note: Three critics of Electronic Gaming Monthly gave the PlayStation 2 version each a score of 4.5/10, 5.5/10, and 7/10.)	N/A
Game Informer	7.25/10	6/10	N/A
GameSpot	6.3/10	N/A	6.4/10
GameZone	N/A	N/A	7.8/10
IGN	7.1/10	8.2/10	7.1/10
Next Generation	N/A	4/5	N/A
Nintendo Power	3/5	N/A	N/A
Official U.S. PlayStation Magazine	N/A	2/5	N/A
Official Xbox Magazine (US)	N/A	N/A	8.6/10
PlayStation: The Official Magazine	N/A	4/10	N/A

The PS2 version received "generally favorable reviews", while the GameCube and Xbox versions received "average" reviews, according to the review aggregation website Metacritic. Frank O'Connor of NextGen called the original ExtraTime "one of two near-perfect renditions of the sport. PS2 soccer fans are spoiled indeed."
