= ESPN MLS GameNight =

2000 video game

- The cover art for the NTSC version of ESPN MLS GameNight. Cover art featuring Carlos Valderrama
- Developers: Saffire; Konami Computer Entertainment Tokyo
- Publisher: Konami
- Producer: Daniel Tyrell
- Composers: Shinji Enomoto; Kosuke Soeda; Akira Yamaoka; Hideki Kasai
- Platform: PlayStation
- Release: NA: September 20, 2000
- Genre: Sports
- Modes: Single player, multiplayer

ESPN MLS GameNight is a video game of the sports genre released in 2000 by Konami and Saffire. The game is considered to be an enhanced remake of ISS Pro Evolution, also published by Konami. It is the only MLS game to have been released on the PlayStation other than FIFA 2000. The sequel, ESPN MLS ExtraTime 2002, was released for PlayStation 2 in 2001, and for GameCube and Xbox in 2002.

The game also featured the option of choosing either English commentary (provided by Bob Ley) or Spanish commentary (provided by Luis Omar Tapia).

== Gameplay ==
It has the option of choosing either 12 teams from the MLS or 53 international teams for a quick, friendly Exhibition game. In Season Mode, the player participates in a full 32-game Major League Soccer season where they are tasked with having to deal with realistic injuries, unpredictable weather conditions, and mid-season trades.

There's also a Custom League mode and a custom-player option that lets the player build up to 22 original players.

== Reception ==
Reception

Aggregate score
Aggregator	Score
Metacritic	70/100

Review scores
Publication	Score
AllGame	4/5
Electronic Gaming Monthly	6.5/10
Game Informer	8/10
GamePro	4/5
GameSpot	7.2/10
IGN	7.9/10
Official U.S. PlayStation Magazine	3/5

The game received "average" reviews according to the review aggregation website Metacritic. Game Informer gave it a favorable review, nearly two months before the game's release.
