= Pro Evolution Soccer 2013 =

2012 video game

- European PS3 cover featuring Real Madrid's Cristiano Ronaldo
- Developer: Konami
- Publisher: Konami
- Producer: Kei Masuda
- Series: Pro Evolution Soccer
- Platforms: Microsoft Windows; PlayStation 2 PlayStation 3 PlayStation Portable; Xbox 360; Wii; Nintendo 3DS
- Release: September 20, 2012: PlayStation 3, Windows, Xbox 360; AU: September 20, 2012 (PS3, X360); EU: September 21, 2012; NA: September 25, 2012; AS: October 23, 2012 (PS3, X360); JP: October 4, 2012 (PS3); KOR: October 4, 2012 (PS3, X360) PlayStation 2; NA: September 25, 2012; EU: October 26, 2012 PlayStation Portable; EU: October 26, 2012; JP: November 1, 2012; NA: November 6, 2012 Wii; JP: November 1, 2012; NA: November 6, 2012; EU: November 9, 2012; AU: December 6, 2012 Nintendo 3DS; JP: November 1, 2012; NA: November 20, 2012; EU: November 30, 2012; AU: December 13, 2012
- Genre: Sports
- Modes: Single-player, multiplayer

Pro Evolution Soccer 2013 (PES 2013, known as World Soccer: Winning Eleven 2013 in Japan and South Korea) is an association football video game developed and published by Konami. The game was announced by Konami on April 18, 2012. For the first time of the series, all 20 teams from the Brazilian national league, Campeonato Brasileiro Serie A, are included in the game series. The UEFA Champions League and UEFA Europa League features in the game. PES 2013 was the last game in the series available on the Nintendo Wii and was succeeded by Pro Evolution Soccer 2014.

== Release ==
The demo version was released on July 25, 2012, followed by the retail version on September 20, 2012 in Australia, on September 21, 2012 in Europe, and in North America on September 25, 2012. Cristiano Ronaldo from Real Madrid is featured for the front cover. Also in Japanese Version, Japanese player Shinji Kagawa which his club is Manchester United was featured again in cover art.

The New Data Pack 6.00 was released on March 7, 2013 which includes all the January transfers.

== Reception ==
Reception

Aggregate scores
Aggregator	Score
GameRankings	(PS3) 81.55% (X360) 80.43% (PC) 72.50% (Wii) 55%
Metacritic	(PS3) 82/100 (X360) 82/100 (PC) 80/100 (Wii) 60/100

Review scores
Publication	Score
Eurogamer	9/10
Game Informer	8.75/10
GameRevolution	3.5/5
GameSpot	8/10
GameTrailers	8.5/10
IGN	8.5/10
Joystiq	4/5
Official Xbox Magazine (UK)	8/10
PC Gamer (UK)	65%
PlayStation: The Official Magazine	8/10
Digital Spy	4/5
The Guardian	4/5

Pro Evolution Soccer 2013 was met with generally positive reception. GameRankings and Metacritic gave it a score of 81.55% and 82 out of 100 for the PlayStation 3 version; 80.43% and 82 out of 100 for the Xbox 360 version; 72.50% and 80 out of 100 for the PC version; and 55% and 60 out of 100 for the Wii version.

The Digital Fix gave the PS3 version a score of nine out of ten, stating, "It might have taken a very long time but PES is finally good again." Digital Spy gave the same version four stars out of five and said, "When the whistle blows and the action is go, PES 2013 is easily a match for FIFA, coming closer than ever to winning back its crown." Neil Davey of The Guardian also gave it four stars out of five, stating: "Is this the Pro Evo to convince Fifa [sic] fans to switch? No. Is it an improvement on the last couple of years' PES incarnations? Yes. Will I be loving it and hating it and still playing it until PES 2014 comes out? Absolutely." The Daily Telegraph gave the Xbox 360 version four stars out of five and called it "[a]n excellent and long overdue return to form."

The game sold 399,340 copies in Japan in 2012.
