= Pro Evolution Soccer 2010 =

2009 video game

- British and Irish cover art featuring (from left to right) FC Barcelona's Lionel Messi and Liverpool's Fernando Torres
- Developer: Konami
- Publisher: Konami
- Designers: Dhanush Mahendran (executive); Naoya Hatsumi (producer); Toru Nagai (artistic director); Satoshi Suzuki (game mechanics director); Jon Murphy (European Team Leader); Son Aubramei (North American Team Leader)
- Series: Pro Evolution Soccer
- Engine: joursaint
- Platforms: Microsoft Windows; PlayStation 2 PlayStation 3 PlayStation Portable; Xbox 360 iOS; Wii; Nokia
- Release: 23 October 2009: PS3 and Xbox 360; EU: 23 October 2009; AU: 29 October 2009; NA: 3 November 2009; JP: 5 November 2009 PC; EU: 23 October 2009; AU: 29 October 2009; NA: 31 December 2009 PSP; EU: 6 November 2009; NA: 10 November 2009 PS2; EU: 6 November 2009; NA: 10 November 2009; AU: 12 November 2009 Wii; NA: 10 November 2009; EU: 20 November 2009; AU: 26 November 2009; JP: 10 December 2009
- Genre: Sports
- Modes: Single-player, multiplayer

Pro Evolution Soccer 2010 (officially abbreviated as PES 2010 and known in Asia as World Soccer: Winning Eleven 2010) is the ninth football video game in the Pro Evolution Soccer series. The game was developed and published by Konami for release on Sony's PlayStation 2, PlayStation 3, and PlayStation Portable; Microsoft's Xbox 360 and Windows; Nintendo's Wii; and mobile phones.

PES 2010 was announced on 8 April 2009 and the playable demo for the PC, PS3, and Xbox 360 versions was released on 17 September 2009. The game itself was released on 23 October 2009 in Europe.

Lionel Messi (FC Barcelona and Argentine player) is a key endorsement player for PES 2010, having featured extensively throughout the promotion and development of the game. He features on the cover alongside Fernando Torres (Spanish and Liverpool F.C. player), another endorsement player. PES 2010 was succeeded by Pro Evolution Soccer 2011.

The game was released on IOS in June 2010.

== Features ==
PES 2010 has the following features.

- PES 2010 contains improved visuals, animations and moves, including live player expressions and movements that will change according to conditions on the field. Animations of dribbling and shots on goal, as well as individual skills, have all been reworked.
- Gameplay has been made more realistic. This includes more versatile goalkeepers and greater control over penalties in terms of placing and accuracy.
- There will be an enhanced online experience: a new development team is solely dedicated to improving online play and other aspects, such as downloadable content and more updates.
- The A.I. has been improved thanks to Teamvision 2.0. Referees have been reworked to make more balanced calls during matches.
- PES 2010 introduces greater strategy control: various strategic elements, such as pass frequency and width of play, can be altered.
- The match-day atmosphere gives a better taste of home and away crowds, which will react spontaneously to all the action on the pitch.
- Master League has been enhanced. It has improved managerial aspects, resulting in an increased managerial career lifespan.
- 360-degree control is introduced, available on the PC, PS3, and Xbox 360 versions of the game via the analog sticks on the respective controllers. PS3 owners will also benefit from this when using the DualShock's D-Pad, but the Wii D-Pad is limited to eight-directional control and the Xbox 360 D-Pad to sixteen-directional control due to their hardware.

== Content ==
With an exclusive deal with UEFA both the UEFA Champions League and (for the first time) the UEFA Europa League are fully licensed. The tournaments are integrated into the Master League mode; however, the Europa League is only available on the PC, PS3 and Xbox 360 versions

Double Fusion signed an agreement with Konami for advertising their clients products in the game.

In total, the game includes 258 squads, with 139 of them being officially licensed. Including the empty league, the game has a total of 55 teams that can be changed completely by user editing.

Like previous versions, there is also a separate league with 18 empty teams (Team A, Team B, etc.), each of which can be edited fully. This was initially introduced when Konami failed to get the rights to the German Bundesliga. Since its introduction, it has become very popular amongst the PES community, and as a result, they are usually made into the Bundesliga or another league of one's preference by patch makers. Popular made leagues are the Liga Sagres, Belgian First Division A, Championship, EFL League One, EFL League Two Liga I, Argentine Primera División or Primera División de México, Greek Superleague and Moroccan Botola Pro.

=== Commentators ===
- Jon Champion and Mark Lawrenson provide the English commentary.
- Grégoire Margotton and Christophe Dugarry provide the French commentary.
- Wolff-Christoph Fuss and Hansi Küpper provide the German commentary.
- Jon Kabira, Tsuyoshi Kitazawa and Masahiro Fukuda provide the Japanese commentary.
- Carlos Martínez and Julio Maldonado Maldini provide the Spanish commentary for Spain.
- Pierluigi Pardo and Jose Altafini provide the Italian commentary.
- Pedro Sousa and João Vieira Pinto provide the Portuguese commentary for Portugal.
- Christian Martinoli and Luis García provide the Spanish commentary for Latin America.

== Reception ==
Reception

Aggregate score
Aggregator	Score
Metacritic	PS3: 78/100; X360: 78/100; PC: 78/100; PSP: 72/100; WII: 82/100 iOS: 75/100

Review scores
Publication	Score
1Up.com	B−
Eurogamer	7/10
GameSpot	6.5/10
IGN	8.7/10.0
PSM3	89/100
VideoGamer.com	7/10

=== Critical response ===
The game has received positive reviews. Greg Howson of The Guardian gave PES 2010 a favourable review, stating, "it has quickly became obvious that on the pitch — ultimately where it matters most, of course — PES simply plays the more satisfying and entertaining game of football [in comparison to FIFA 10]. When it comes to the basic on-pitch action there looks to be a clear winner". IGN gave the game an 8.7/10, while PSM3 gave the game an 89. GameSpot, however, gave the PS3 and 360 versions a 6.5.

== Other editions ==
=== World Soccer: Winning Eleven 2010 - Arcade Championship ===
On February 24, 2010, the latest Winning Eleven arcade title was released. Arcade Championship 2010 is the latest entry in the arcade Winning Eleven series, and a followup to Arcade Championship 2008. The game retains many of the features of that title, including nationwide online play and the ability to use PlayStation 2 controllers. PlayStation 3 controllers are supported as well, although only in some cabinets. Outside of a major leap in visuals, updates include 300 added motions, the ability to dribble in all directions, and an update in team count to around 230. New systems include the Icon Chat System for simple communication during matches, and a Real Time Player Substitution system which lets you specify player substitutions whenever you like. These systems use the game's touch screen. The game also includes a Tag Play mode. Two players can use two cabinets to control a single team together. Following the match, the game gives you a "Sychro Rate," indicating your compatibility. Konami will be holding an in-game tournament using the Competition Mode to coincide with the UEFA Champions League tournament. The schedule for the in-game tournament is being worked to match the real tournament.

=== World Soccer: Winning Eleven 2010 - Aoki Samurai no Chousen ===
World Soccer: Winning Eleven 2010 - Aoki Samurai no Chousen
- Developer: Konami Computer Entertainment Tokyo
- Publisher: Konami
- Designers: Shingo 'Seabass' Takatsuka (executive); Naoya Hatsumi (producer); Toru Nagai (artistic director); Satoshi Suzuki (game mechanics director)
- Series: Pro Evolution Soccer
- Platforms: PlayStation 2, PlayStation 3, PlayStation Portable and Wii
- Release: JP: 20 May 2010
- Genre: Sports
- Modes: Single-player, Multiplayer

On 3 February 2010, Konami announced that it will release World Soccer: Winning Eleven 2010 - Aoki Samurai no Chousen - translated to Challenge of Blue Samurai. (stylised WORLD SOCCER Winning Eleven 2010 Aoki Samurai no Chousen) in spring 2010 for PlayStation 3, PlayStation 2, PlayStation Portable and Wii. The new title is the latest installment in the Winning Eleven series which has sold over 56 million copies (as of September 2009) worldwide. In Aoki Samurai no Chosen players can join the Japan national team as it goes toe-to-toe against the top teams from around the world in a bid to be crowned world champion. Officially licensed by the Japan Football Association, the new release features the biggest names in Japanese soccer sporting their national team uniforms. The new title builds on the excitement generated during this official "Year of Sports" in Japan and is sure to score a major goal with soccer fans across the country. The game will be an expanded version of the current PES 2010 game having the same AI engine. The game is set to be released on May 20, 2010.
