= Pro Evolution Soccer 6 =

2006 video game

- European PlayStation 2 cover art featuring Inter Milan's Adriano and Chelsea's John Terry
- Developer: Konami
- Publisher: Konami
- Series: Pro Evolution Soccer
- Engine: RenderWare
- Platforms: Microsoft Windows; PlayStation 2 PlayStation Portable; Nintendo DS; Xbox 360
- Release: PlayStation 2: JP: 27 April 2006; EU: 27 October 2006; AU: 3 November 2006; NA: 6 February 2007; Xbox 360: EU: 27 October 2006; AU: 3 November 2006; JP: 14 December 2006; NA: 6 February 2007; Windows: EU: 27 October 2006; AU: 10 November 2006; NA: June 2007; Nintendo DS: JP: 2 November 2006; AU: 8 December 2006; NA: 6 February 2007; EU: 9 February 2007; KOR: 12 April 2007; PlayStation Portable: EU: 1 December 2006; AU: 8 December 2006; JP: 14 December 2006; KOR: 14 December 2006; NA: 6 February 2007
- Genre: Sports
- Modes: Single-player, Multiplayer

Pro Evolution Soccer 6, known as Winning Eleven: Pro Evolution Soccer 2007 in the United States, (Note: Known in Japan and South Korea as World Soccer: Winning Eleven 10 for PS2, World Soccer: Winning Eleven 10 Ubiquitous Evolution for PSP, World Soccer: Winning Eleven DS for DS, and World Soccer: Winning Eleven X for Xbox 360) is a video game developed and published by Konami. Released in 2006 for the PlayStation 2, Xbox 360, and Microsoft Windows platforms and following on the Nintendo DS and PlayStation Portable afterward, Pro Evolution Soccer 6 is the 6th edition of the Pro Evolution Soccer series for the PlayStation 2, 2nd for the PlayStation Portable and 4th for Microsoft Windows. It is the first game to debut on the Nintendo DS and the Xbox 360. The Xbox 360 version features improved graphics, but retains gameplay similar to the other console versions. The edit mode has been stripped down for the Xbox 360 release, due to time restrictions. The graphics engine on the PC does not utilise the next-gen 360 engine but is once more a direct conversion of the PlayStation 2 engine.

As with previous versions, the game features an edit mode allowing the player to edit certain elements of the game. A Bundesliga license was supposed to be a feature of the game (being present in the original Japanese release of Winning Eleven 10 for the PS2), but due to Germany leaving FIFPRO, Konami were forced to remove the teams, which means the Bundesliga is not present in PES6, not even as a series of unlicensed teams, with the exception of FC Bayern Munich who were fully licensed with the omission of their shirt sponsor T-Home. From then on, no further games featured the Bundesliga, with the participation of German teams restricted to a few of its teams appearing in separate blocks (like the UEFA Champions League teams without their own league). It is also the last Pro Evolution Soccer game to use a sequel number moniker, being replaced with the year featuring in the title from then on. Also it was the first installment released with "Pro Evolution Soccer" name on North America.

PES 6 was succeeded by Pro Evolution Soccer 2008. The Japanese release of PS2 and PSP features both Zico and Shunsuke Nakamura, with the DS release features chibi version of Nakamura, and the Xbox release (known as Winning Eleven X) features Adriano.

== New features ==
=== International Challenge Mode ===
PES6 marks the first time the International Challenge Mode has been included on the PES Series. Usually this is seen on the Japanese version — Winning Eleven — where you play as Japan and take them through the qualifiers of the International Cup and then attempt to win it, under the name "Nippon Challenge". In PES6, however, you have the ability to choose most playable nations on the game, while each zone also has teams that are unavailable for play in any mode. The user can only play the qualifiers from Europe, North/Central America or South America (with the Asian qualifiers available in Winning Eleven 10), and can perform national call-ups between rounds. Although the tournament is not licensed, the qualifiers have a lot of similarities to the FIFA World Cup qualification process, albeit following abridged formats:

- The European qualifiers are played by 32 teams divided in eight groups of four, with matches played in a round-robin format within each group. The group winners advance to the final tournament, while the second places advance to a playoff round to define the remaining places.
- The North and Central American qualifiers are played by six teams in a round-robin league. The top three advance to the final tournament, while the fourth place moves on to an intercontinental playoff round.
- The South American qualifiers are played by 10 teams in a round-robin league. The top four advance to the final tournament, while the fourth place moves on to an intercontinental playoff round.
- The Asian qualifiers are played by 8 teams divided in two groups of four, with matches played in a round-robin format within each group. The top two teams of each group advance to the final tournament, while the third places play off against each other, then move on to an intercontinental playoff. Due to Nippon Challenge still being a separate mode, Japan cannot be selected in International Challenge.

The International Challenge mode is only available in the PlayStation 2 and PC versions of PES6. The Xbox 360 and PSP versions do not include this mode.

== Game Modes ==
=== Random Selection Match ===
Also new to PES6 is the Random Selection Match. In this mode, the user can pick up to either four clubs/nations or one region/league. Once selected, the computer picks a random selection of players from the teams or region for the player's squad. The lineup is selected automatically, although players can choose to let the computer to pick another random selection. This was not included in the PSP and Xbox 360 version, presumably because of time restrictions.

=== PES Shop ===
- Players are available as always, but there have been many more added (all unlicensed, but based on real players). It's not only retired "legendary players" that can be bought, Juan Sebastián Verón (playing for Estudiantes de la Plata by then), Fernando Cavenaghi (then at Spartak Moscow) and Freddy Adu (at D.C. United then) being the most notable cases.
- Costumes can be bought. The Ostrich and Raptor costumes have the players riding them. The Penguin costume has the player in a penguin suit. When riding the raptors, they shoot, header, control, pass and do all the hard work, but their shooting ability is much less than a normal player.
- Gameplay frames, new hairstyles, new goal celebrations, and new stadiums are other new features available in the PES Shop.
- The PES Shop is present on all versions of the game, with the exception of the Xbox 360 version.

=== Network ===
Groups have been introduced on the PES Network. A player can join/create a group that can gain points by playing together. Groups can play each other in rival matches. If a player creates a group, they manage who's in and who's out, the team name, and who else can allow others to join and matches. A player can join a group by applying to join or accepting an invitation from another player. If the leader accepts, they are in the group. Only ten are allowed in one group at first, but there can potentially be 30 in a group at one time. Groups can reach levels with the highest level to progress to is Level 14. When you achieve higher levels, you will unlock different costumes (penguin, dinosaur, and ostrich) and classic national teams. Also, you can achieve extra member spaces in your group when you go up in level.

The Network capabilities have since been relinquished.

== Licenses ==
Ligue 1 was licensed for the first time in the series. The game also included several fully-licensed national teams that participated at the 2006 FIFA World Cup.

== Platform differences ==
The Xbox 360 version is the only version with a fully analogue Manual Pass feature, as well as more sophisticated ball physics compared to the PS2.

== Reception ==
Reception

Aggregate scores
| Aggregator | Score | | | | |
| Aggregator | DS | PC | PS2 | PSP | Xbox 360 |
|---|---|---|---|---|---|
| GameRankings | 64% | 85.80% | 86.31% | 81.36% | 79.13% |
| Metacritic | (US) 64/100 (EU) 63/100 | 88/100 | (EU) 89/100 (US) 86/100 | (US) 82/100 (EU) 81/100 | (US) 80/100 (EU) 79/100 |

Review scores
| Publication | Score | | | | |
| Publication | DS | PC | PS2 | PSP | Xbox 360 |
|---|---|---|---|---|---|
| Electronic Gaming Monthly | N/A | N/A | N/A | N/A | 7.83/10 |
| Eurogamer | N/A | N/A | 8/10 | 8/10 | 8/10 |
| Game Informer | N/A | N/A | 8/10 | N/A | 8/10 |
| GameSpot | 6.9/10 | N/A | 8.7/10 | 8.2/10 | 8.1/10 |
| GameSpy | N/A | N/A | 4.5/5 | 4/5 | 3.5/5 |
| GameTrailers | N/A | N/A | 8.4/10 | N/A | 8.4/10 |
| GameZone | 6/10 | N/A | 8.5/10 | 8.5/10 | 8.5/10 |
| IGN | 6.1/10 | N/A | 8.6/10 | 8.5/10 | 8.3/10 |
| Nintendo Power | 6.5/10 | N/A | N/A | N/A | N/A |
| Official Xbox Magazine (US) | N/A | N/A | N/A | N/A | 8.5/10 |
| PC Gamer (US) | N/A | 77% | N/A | N/A | N/A |
| PlayStation: The Official Magazine | N/A | N/A | 9/10 | 8/10 | N/A |
| Detroit Free Press | N/A | N/A | N/A | N/A | 3/4 |
| The Sydney Morning Herald | N/A | N/A | N/A | N/A | 4.5/5 |

In Japan, the PlayStation 2 and PlayStation Portable versions sold 1,292,472 units in 2006. In Europe, over 3 million units were shipped in its launch weekend. The PlayStation 2 version of Pro Evolution Soccer 6 received a "Double Platinum" sales award from the Entertainment and Leisure Software Publishers Association (ELSPA), indicating sales of at least 600,000 copies in the United Kingdom. ELSPA gave the game's Xbox 360 release a "Platinum" certification, for sales of at least 300,000 copies in the region.

The game was met with positive to mixed reception. For the U.S. port, GameRankings and Metacritic gave it a score of 86.31% and 86 out of 100 for the PlayStation 2 version; 85.80% for the PC version; 81.36% and 82 out of 100 for the PSP version; 79.13% and 80 out of 100 for the Xbox 360 version; and 64% and 64 out of 100 for the DS version. For the European port, Metacritic gave it a score of 89 out of 100 for the PS2 version; 88 out of 100 for the PC version; 81 out of 100 for the PSP version; 79 out of 100 for the X360 version; and 63 out of 100 for the DS version.

The PS2 version got a perfect 10/10 score in Official UK PlayStation 2 Magazine, which beat FIFA 07 (9/10 in the same magazine). However, the PSP version of the game ranked beneath the FIFA 07 PSP version due to slow loading times and an incomplete editor. Hyper's Eliot Fish commended the game for its "tighter dribbling [and] refined Master League" but criticised it for its commentary.

The Times gave the PS2, PC, and X360 versions a score of all five stars and stated that "you can make a sliding tackle and come up with the ball, and the AI has been greatly improved. The passing and shooting have been made harder to master and the players’ movement off the ball is better." In The Sydney Morning Herald, Fish gave the X360 version a score of four-and-a-half stars out of five and stated, "Owners of an Xbox 360 have a right to feel a little miffed that their version isn't identical to the PS2 but Pro Evo 6 is still top of the table." However, George Mathis of Detroit Free Press gave the same version a score of three stars out of four and said, "Unlike the PS2 version, team and player names cannot be changed. This is a problem because many of the world's most famous teams and players are not licensed, meaning you'll be stuck playing generic teams such as the London Soccer Club."

== Legacy ==
Pro Evolution Soccer 6 has retrospectively been regarded as one of the high points of the Pro Evolution Soccer series and of association football video games more broadly. In 2016, FourFourTwo ranked it as the second-greatest football video game ever made, behind Sensible World of Soccer, and described it as producer Shingo Takatsuka's finest work. The publication praised its passing, shooting and artificial intelligence and noted that, for some players, it remained the last great entry in the Pro Evolution Soccer series.

In a 2024 retrospective, French football magazine So Foot described Pro Evolution Soccer 6 as a cult title whose popularity and reputation remained strong 18 years after its release. The publication highlighted the game's gameplay, multiplayer appeal and association with prominent players of the period as contributing to its lasting reputation. It also noted the continuing production of videos and livestreams centred on older Pro Evolution Soccer games, and cited FC Metz's use of imagery inspired by Pro Evolution Soccer 6 to reveal the club's third kit in 2024 as an example of its continued cultural recognition.

In 2026, Operation Sports described Pro Evolution Soccer 6 as one of the leading candidates for the greatest football video game ever made, arguing that its gameplay remained competitive with modern football simulations nearly 20 years after its release. The publication particularly praised its dribbling, passing, defending and Master League mode, and noted that an active community continued to produce unofficial patches adding updated squads, kits and other content.
