= Pro Evolution Soccer 4 =

2004 video game

- Cover featuring Arsenal's Thierry Henry, referee Pierluigi Collina and Roma's Francesco Totti
- Developer: Konami Computer Entertainment Tokyo
- Publisher: Konami
- Series: Pro Evolution Soccer
- Platforms: PlayStation 2 Xbox; Microsoft Windows
- Release: August 5, 2004: PlayStation 2; JP: August 5, 2004; PAL: October 15, 2004; NA: February 1, 2005 Xbox; EU: November 26, 2004; AU: December 3, 2004; NA: February 1, 2005 Windows; PAL: December 3, 2004; NA: February 8, 2005
- Genre: Sports game
- Modes: Single-player, multiplayer

Pro Evolution Soccer 4 (known as World Soccer: Winning Eleven 8 in Japan and World Soccer: Winning Eleven 8 International in North America) is the fourth installment of Konami's Pro Evolution Soccer football simulation video game series. It's the first game of the series to appear on the original Xbox, with online gameplay.

The Japanese version cover features Zico for the second time in a row.

The European version cover features Arsenal striker Thierry Henry, AS Roma forward Francesco Totti, and world-renowned Italian referee Pierluigi Collina. It was the first game in the series to feature licensed leagues.

Winning Eleven 8: Liveware Evolution marked the first game in the PES series to feature online play for the PlayStation 2, while Winning Eleven 8/Pro Evolution Soccer 4 does not feature it. Within online play, statistics and league points are stored on the server for each game played. PES 4 was succeeded by Pro Evolution Soccer 5, which was released in 2005.

== Features ==
- Expanded Master League teams containing up to 72 teams. More elements added to the development and retirement of master league players. Winning a game in Master League will raise the abilities of your players.
- A total of more than 200 club and national teams
- Three fully licensed leagues (Serie A, Eredivisie and Liga Española).
- For the first time, referees are on the pitch during the game. There is also an animated linesman seen after a player is given offside. The referee will not issue a yellow card for the first 'average' tackle, but if a player continues to commit 'average' fouls, a card will be given
- Wear and tear including dirt will be visible on the player's uniforms according to the pitch conditions.
- Improved edit mode allowing changes to be made to league names and the ability to put text on the kits.

== Reception ==
Reception

Aggregate score
Aggregator	Score		
Aggregator	PC	PS2	Xbox
Metacritic	(EU) 92/100 (US) 88/100	(US) 91/100 (EU) 91/100	(EU) 91/100 (US) 90/100

Review scores
Publication	Score		
Publication	PC	PS2	Xbox
Edge	N/A	9/10	N/A
Electronic Gaming Monthly	N/A	8.83/10	8.83/10
Eurogamer	9/10	9/10	9/10
Game Informer	N/A	8.75/10	8.75/10
GamePro	N/A	4.5/5	4.5/5
GameRevolution	A−	A−	A−
GameSpot	8.7/10	9.3/10	9.3/10
GameSpy	N/A	5/5	5/5
GameZone	9.5/10	9.5/10	9.5/10
IGN	N/A	9.4/10	9.4/10
Official U.S. PlayStation Magazine	N/A	4.5/5	N/A
Official Xbox Magazine (US)	N/A	N/A	8.3/10
PC Gamer (US)	89%	N/A	N/A
Detroit Free Press	N/A	N/A	3/4
The Sydney Morning Herald	N/A	5/5	N/A

In Japan, the PS2 version sold 1 million copies on its first day of release, and eventually sold 1.11 million units. In Europe, the PS2 version shipped 1.5 million units on its first day of release, setting a launch sales record. It was a hit in Italy, where more than 400,000 units were sold for over €16 million or $20,000,000 (equivalent to $34,000,000 in 2025) by November 2004. The PlayStation 2 version of Pro Evolution Soccer 4 received a "Double Platinum" sales award from the Entertainment and Leisure Software Publishers Association (ELSPA), indicating sales of at least 600,000 copies in the United Kingdom.

The game received "universal acclaim" on all platforms in all regions except the U.S. PC version, which received "favorable" reviews according to video game review aggregator Metacritic.

The Sydney Morning Herald gave the PS2 version all five stars, stating that "There are myriad ways to score, yet goals are always well-earned." The Times also gave the same version all five stars, stating, "The intuitive control system and [the] fluidity of the movement are of the highest standard and this year’s model includes a bag of new dribbling tricks, which are worth practising in the training mode. Even the referees have received an upgrade." BBC Sport gave the game 95% and said, "Greater emphasis has been placed on one-touch play, and while goals are not all that easy to come by - creating chances requires quick thinking and accurate distribution - when you do manage to make the net bulge, it's all the more satisfying." However, Maxim gave the game a score of eight out of ten and said, "Although it's dogged by Commodore 64-quality music and selective licensing agreements... this new edition more than compensates with killer graphics, new tricks, and an improved dribbling system." Detroit Free Press gave the Xbox version three stars out of four and said that it "really isn't a leap above Winning Eleven 7. Though the variety of play modes is huge, the well-animated visuals could use some polish, the audio sounds rather bland and the number of licensed teams and players is a bit wimpy."

Winning Eleven 8 was a finalist for PC Gamer US's "Best Sports Game 2005" award, which ultimately went to Tiger Woods PGA Tour 06.
