= Jon Kabira =

Japanese television personality

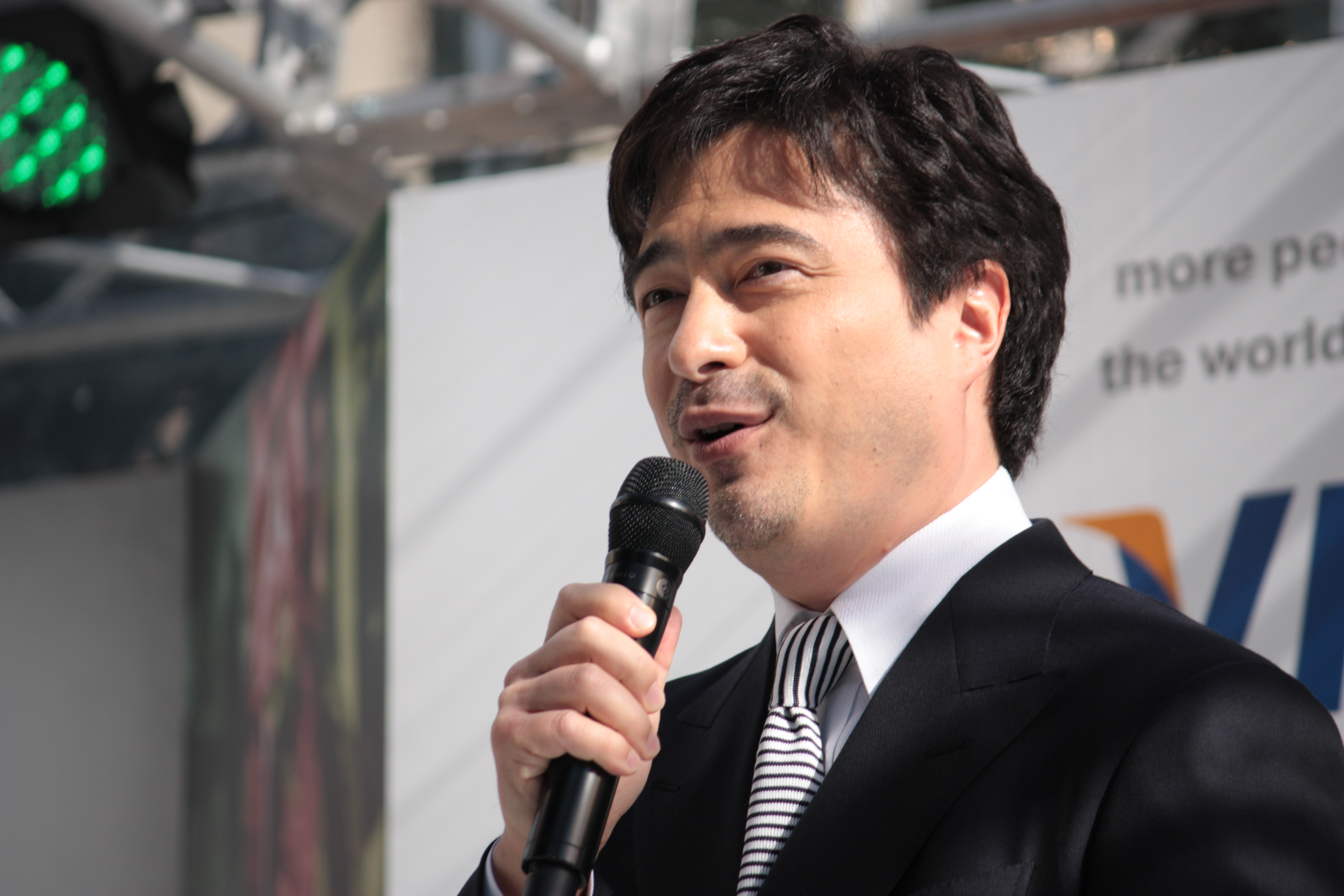
- Kabira at a World Cup 2010 event in Tokyo
- Born: November 1, 1958 (age 67); Naha, USCAR (now Naha, Okinawa, Japan)
- Occupations: Presenter, tarento, radio personality, narrator
- Years active: 1988–present
- Website: Jon Kabira's site (in Japanese)

Jon Kabira (ジョン・カビラ), born Jion Kabira (川平 慈温, Kabira Jion; November 1, 1958 in Naha, Okinawa, Japan), is a Japanese freelance presenter, tarento, radio personality, narrator who is affiliated with Sony Music Artists. He is very popular in Japan having participated in various TV commercials, TV shows, among other Audio-visual-related activities. Kabira is well known in the West due to his narration in the eFootball video game series. He comments alongside former ex-Japanese footballers Tsuyoshi Kitazawa and Hiroshi Nanami, in the past games he also comments alongside other ex-Japanese players like Yasutaro Matsuki, Kozo Tashima, Hiroshi Hayano and Tetsuo Nakanishi.

Kabira is the son of Chosei Kabira (川平朝清), an Okinawan broadcaster who later served as a senior executive of NHK and Showa Women's University, and his wife Wandalee, a Kansas native who worked as a teacher at the American School in Japan. His younger brother Jay Kabira (川平 慈英, Kabira Jiei) is also active as a media personality.

== Filmography ==
=== Movies ===
- Pokémon: Destiny Deoxys (Gurū)
- Shrek 2 (Doris)
- Goal! (Martin Tyler)
- Shrek the Third (Doris)
- Pride (Soichiro Asami)
- Shrek Forever After (Doris)

=== TV ===
- Thomas & Friends (Narrator, 2008–2018)
- Chatty Jay's Sundry Shop (Host, 2016–2019)

=== Video games ===
- Hakunetsu Pro Yakyuu Ganba League (Voice)
- eFootball series (Commentator)
- Hyper Formation Soccer (Supervisor, Voice)

== See also ==
- Eigo de Shabera Night
- J-League Jikkyō Winning Eleven 97
- Pro Evolution Soccer 2010
- Pro Evolution Soccer 2011
