= International Superstar Soccer Pro =

1997 video game

- European cover art
- Developer: Konami Computer Entertainment Tokyo
- Publisher: Konami
- Director: Shingo Takatsuka
- Producers: Kazuhisa Hashimoto; Gozo Kitao
- Composer: Hideo Kinoshita
- Series: International Superstar Soccer; Winning Eleven
- Platform: PlayStation
- Release: NA: May 2, 1997; EU: June 1997; JP: June 5, 1997
- Genre: Sports
- Modes: Single-player, multiplayer

International Superstar Soccer Pro (known in Japan as World Soccer: Winning Eleven '97 (ワールドサッカー ウイニングイレブン'97, Wārudo Sakkā Winingu Ireben '97) and in North America as Goal Storm '97) is a 1997 football video game developed by Konami Computer Entertainment Tokyo and published by Konami for the PlayStation. It is a slightly improved version of the Japan-exclusive J-League Jikkyō Winning Eleven 97.

It features 32 international teams, four different stadia, 13 team formations along with eight unique strategies and a choice of Exhibition Mode, International League, International Cup and a Penalty Kick mode. It can be played as a one or two player game.

== Teams available ==

International Superstar Soccer Pro includes 32 different international teams based on their real equivalents of season 1996/1997 with accurate home, away and goalkeeper kits featuring manufacturer logos and national emblems. The lineup of each team consists of 16 fictional players.

== Reception ==
Reception

Review scores
| Publication | Score |
|---|---|
| Computer and Video Games | 5/5 |
| Edge | 9/10 |
| Electronic Gaming Monthly | 9/10 |
| Famitsu | 26/40 |
| Game Informer | 8.75/10 |
| GameFan | 84% |
| IGN | 6/10 |
| Joystick | 90% |
| Next Generation | 4/5 |
| PlayStation Official Magazine – UK | 8/10 |

The game was met with positive reviews. Critics were particularly pleased with the fluid, lifelike animations, and the simplicity and responsiveness of the controls. In addition, the game was also praised for its strong blend of realism and fun, an aspect which was noted by Kraig Kujawa of Electronic Gaming Monthly. However, the audio was criticized, with the primary complaints being the inconsistency of the announcer and the annoying clicking sound which accompanies players moving down the field. In Japan, Famitsu gave it a score of 26 out of 40.

Next Generation was generally positive to the game. Although the magazine commented that the game cannot be compared with Worldwide Soccer '97 for Sega Saturn in terms of graphics and controls, they appreciated the pace and strategy of the game, and ultimately recommended the game for PlayStation owners. GamePro concluded that it comes in second to FIFA 97, but recommended players rent both games to see which one better suits their tastes. (Note: GamePro gave the game two 4/5 scores for graphics and control, 3/5 for sound, and 3.5/5 for overall fun factor.) In Absolute PlayStation, Martin gave it an 86% and called it "the first soccer game on PSX that has the correct balance between superb graphics and intuitive controls", while co-reviewer Adam gave it an 8/10 and praised the players for being easily recognizable despite the absence of a players' license.

== Legacy ==
International Superstar Soccer Pro was considered a "game-changer" for football games, which had been largely dominated by rival FIFA on home systems for the last several years. Developed by Konami Tokyo, ISS Pro introduced a new 3D engine capable of better graphics and more sophisticated gameplay than its rival. Whereas FIFA had a simpler "arcade-style" approach to its gameplay, ISS Pro introduced more complex simulation gameplay emphasizing tactics and improvisation, enabled by tactical variety such as nine in-match strategy options. It spawned the Pro Evolution Soccer (PES) series, which became known for having "faster-paced tactical play" and more varied emergent gameplay, while FIFA was known for having more licenses. In the late 2000s, EA responded by borrowing gameplay elements from PES to improve FIFA, which eventually pulled ahead commercially by a significant margin in the 2010s and emerged as the world's most successful sports video game franchise. The rivalry between FIFA and PES is considered the "greatest rivalry" in the history of sports video games.

== See also ==
- International Superstar Soccer 64
