= Essentials (PlayStation) =

Sony PlayStation budget range

Official Platinum and Essentials banners used on PlayStation game covers

Essentials is the Sony PlayStation budget range in the PAL region, which covers Europe, the Middle East and Africa, Australia and South Asia. It was launched in 1997 as the Platinum range but was later renamed for PlayStation Portable, PlayStation 3, PlayStation Vita and PlayStation 4. After reaching the required level of sales, Sony often dropped the prices of the original title to Platinum pricing levels (generally about half of the original retail price), as a way to clear inventory for retailers. Similar budget ranges from Sony include the Greatest Hits and The Best labels for the North American and Japanese markets, respectively.

== History and requirements ==
Platinum was introduced in March 1997 and the first titles under it were Air Combat, Battle Arena Toshinden, Destruction Derby, Ridge Racer, Tekken and Wipeout. At launch, a game required a minimum of 100,000 sales across the PAL region and needed to have been on sale for at least one year before qualifying for a Platinum re-release. The criteria was tightened in late 1997, reducing the required time on sale to nine months while raising the sales threshold to 250,000 copies sold in Europe. The threshold was subsequently raised again to 400,000 copies in 1998, and then 500,000 copies in 1999.

As of 2006, the requirements were over 400,000 sales after six months on the PAL market. Games that sell over 400,000 units in another region alone, such as Japan or the US, do not necessarily qualify for a Platinum title. For PlayStation Portable releases, the target is 400,000 unit sales required to achieve Platinum status. As of 2008, any PS2, PSP or PS3 game that sold over 400,000 units on the PAL market qualified for Platinum status.

The Platinum distinction has since been extended. Since 2010, it has been renamed Essentials for the PlayStation Portable, PlayStation 3, PlayStation Vita and PlayStation 4. The first PS3 titles were released on August 1, 2008, namely: Assassin's Creed, Heavenly Sword, MotorStorm, Ratchet & Clank Future: Tools of Destruction, Uncharted: Drake's Fortune and Virtua Tennis 3.

For PlayStation 4 games the name was changed to PlayStation Hits. The first games under the new label were released on 18 July 2018 in PS Store and in retail stores for €19.99 / £15.99 each.

== Design differences ==
Platinum Range titles were recognisable by a platinum/silver coloured band on the game's casing, both the front and the spine. The PlayStation design used the same logo that was introduced in early 1997 for all PAL region game cases, the differences being the colouring and that it indicates itself as Platinum. The PlayStation 2 design of the platinum games had a silver band to act as a border and to contain the game's original cover, which is shrunk to fill about 75% of the platinum cover. The early platinum games that were released prior to 2003 had the PlayStation logo repeated twice on the front case, once on the platinum border, and once on the original game's case. (with the original game's case dropping the PlayStation logo after 2002.) In 2005, a new featured layout was introduced; these have a black border, and silver outlines around the shrunken original game cover. There is also a red orb located at the bottom of the original game cover with the words Platinum The Best of PlayStation 2 and Platinum The Best of PSP (PlayStation Portable) for PlayStation 2 and PlayStation Portable games respectively. The platinum band can also be seen on the manual. The PlayStation 3 Platinum range box art replaces the black background of the PlayStation 3 logo on the left with a yellow background, and has the original box art shrunk slightly, with a grey border, and a yellow rectangle on top of it, with Platinum The Best of PlayStation 3 written on it.

PlayStation and PlayStation 2 platinum game discs do not feature any of the original game disc design; instead, it is replaced with a simple silver design – which, along with the copyright notices around the edges, features the game's name in the centre surrounded by a black outline. PlayStation Portable platinum games use the original UMD games' disc design whilst PlayStation 3 platinum games use the original disc design with a platinum design on the disc.

== List of Platinum range games ==
=== PlayStation titles ===
- 007 Racing
- 007: The World Is Not Enough
- 007: Tomorrow Never Dies
- Ace Combat 3: Electrosphere
- Actua Soccer
- Adidas Power Soccer
- Air Combat
- Alien Trilogy
- Alone in the Dark: The New Nightmare
- Ape Escape
- Atlantis: The Lost Empire
- A Bug's Life
- Battle Arena Toshinden
- Bust-A-Move 2
- C-12: Final Resistance
- Chase the Express
- Colin McRae Rally
- Colin McRae Rally 2.0
- Command & Conquer
- Command & Conquer: Red Alert
- Cool Boarders 2
- Cool Boarders 3
- Cool Boarders 4
- Crash Bandicoot
- Crash Bandicoot 2: Cortex Strikes Back
- Crash Bandicoot 3: Warped
- Crash Team Racing
- Crash Bash
- Croc: Legend of the Gobbos
- Dancing Stage PARTY EDiTiON
- Destruction Derby
- Destruction Derby 2
- Destruction Derby Raw
- Die Hard Trilogy
- Digimon World
- Dinosaur
- Disney's Aladdin in Nasira's Revenge
- Disney's Action Game Featuring Hercules
- Disney's Tarzan
- Disney's Treasure Planet
- Donald Duck: Quack Attack
- Doom
- Driver
- Driver 2
- The Emperor's New Groove
- F1 Championship Season 2000
- Fade to Black
- FIFA Soccer 96
- FIFA: Road to World Cup 98
- FIFA 99
- FIFA 2000
- FIFA 2001
- FIFA Football 2005
- Final Fantasy VII
- Final Fantasy VIII
- Final Fantasy IX
- Formula 1
- Formula 1 97
- Formula One 2001
- G-Police
- Gran Turismo
- Gran Turismo 2
- Grand Theft Auto
- Heart of Darkness
- In Cold Blood
- International Track & Field
- International Superstar Soccer Pro
- ISS Pro Evolution
- The Italian Job
- The Jungle Book Groove Party
- Lilo & Stitch: Trouble in Paradise
- Loaded
- The Lost World: Jurassic Park
- Legacy of Kain: Soul Reaver
- Lucky Luke
- Medal of Honor
- Medal of Honor: Underground
- MediEvil
- MediEvil 2
- Metal Gear Solid
- Mickey's Wild Adventure
- Micro Machines V3
- Monsters, Inc. Scare Island
- Monopoly
- Mortal Kombat Trilogy
- Moto Racer
- Moto Racer 2
- Moto Racer World Tour
- Need for Speed: Road Challenge
- Need for Speed: Porsche 2000
- Oddworld: Abe's Oddysee
- Oddworld: Abe's Exoddus
- Pandemonium!
- Parasite Eve 2
- Peter Pan: Adventures in Never Land
- PGA Tour 96
- Porsche Challenge
- Rayman
- Rayman 2: The Great Escape
- Resident Evil
- Resident Evil 2
- Ridge Racer
- Ridge Racer Revolution
- Ridge Racer Type 4
- Road Rash
- Rugrats in Paris: The Movie
- Sheep, Dog, 'n' Wolf
- Silent Hill
- Soul Blade
- Soviet Strike
- Spider-Man
- Spider-Man 2: Enter Electro
- Spyro the Dragon
- Spyro 2: Gateway to Glimmer
- Spyro: Year of the Dragon
- Star Wars: Rebel Assault II: The Hidden Empire
- Street Fighter EX Plus Alpha
- Stuart Little 2
- Syphon Filter 2
- Syphon Filter 3
- Tekken
- Tekken 2
- Tekken 3
- Tenchu: Stealth Assassins
- Thunderhawk 2: Firestorm
- Tigger's Honey Hunt
- Time Crisis
- Time Crisis: Project Titan
- TOCA Touring Car Championship
- TOCA 2 Touring Cars
- TOCA World Touring Cars
- Tom Clancy's Rainbow Six: Rogue Spear
- Tomb Raider
- Tomb Raider II
- Tomb Raider III
- Tomb Raider: Chronicles
- Tony Hawk's Skateboarding
- Tony Hawk's Pro Skater 2
- Tony Hawk's Pro Skater 3
- Tony Hawk's Pro Skater 4
- Toy Story 2: Buzz Lightyear to the Rescue
- True Pinball
- V-Rally
- V-Rally 2
- Wipeout
- Wipeout 2097
- Worms
- WRC: FIA World Rally Championship Arcade
- WWF SmackDown!
- WWF SmackDown! 2: Know Your Role
- WWF War Zone

=== PlayStation 2 titles ===
- 007: Agent Under Fire
- 007: Everything or Nothing
- 007: Nightfire
- 007: Quantum of Solace
- 24: The Game
- 50 Cent: Bulletproof
- Athens 2004
- Battlefield 2: Modern Combat
- Ben 10: Protector of Earth
- Black
- Bratz: Forever Diamondz
- Bratz: Rock Angelz
- Brothers in Arms: Road to Hill 30
- Burnout
- Burnout 2: Point of Impact
- Burnout 3: Takedown
- Burnout Dominator
- Burnout Revenge
- Call of Duty 2: Big Red One
- Call of Duty 3
- Call of Duty: Finest Hour
- Call of Duty: World at War – Final Fronts
- Canis Canem Edit
- Chicken Little
- Colin McRae Rally 3
- Colin McRae Rally 04
- Colin McRae Rally 2005
- Conflict: Desert Storm
- Conflict: Desert Storm II
- Conflict: Vietnam
- Crash Bandicoot: The Wrath of Cortex
- Crash of the Titans
- Crash: Nitro Kart
- Crash: Tag Team Racing
- Crash: Twinsanity
- Crazy Taxi
- Dead or Alive 2
- Devil May Cry
- Devil May Cry 2
- Disney: Pirates of the Caribbean: At World's End
- Disney•Pixar: Cars
- Disney•Pixar: Ratatouille
- Dragon Ball Z: Budokai
- Dragon Ball Z: Budokai 2
- Dragon Ball Z: Budokai 3
- Dragon Ball Z: Budokai Tenkaichi
- Dragon Ball Z: Budokai Tenkaichi 2
- Dragon Ball Z: Budokai Tenkaichi 3
- Dragon Quest: The Journey of the Cursed King
- DRIV3R
- EA Sports Rugby 08
- Enter the Matrix
- EyeToy: Groove
- EyeToy: Play
- EyeToy: Play 2
- EyeToy: Play 3
- EyeToy: Play: Astro Zoo
- EyeToy: Sports
- FIFA 2001
- FIFA Football 2002
- FIFA Football 2003
- FIFA Football 2004
- FIFA Football 2005
- FIFA 06
- FIFA 07
- FIFA 08
- FIFA 09
- FIFA 10
- FIFA 11
- FIFA 12
- FIFA 13
- FIFA 14
- FIFA Street
- FIFA Street 2
- Final Fantasy X
- Final Fantasy X-2
- Final Fantasy XII
- Finding Nemo
- Formula One 2001
- Formula One 2003
- Formula One 04
- Formula One 05
- Formula One 06
- From Russia with Love
- God of War
- God of War II
- GoldenEye: Rogue Agent
- Gran Turismo 3: A-Spec
- Gran Turismo 4
- Gran Turismo Concept: 2002 Tokyo-Geneva
- Grand Theft Auto III
- Grand Theft Auto: Liberty City Stories
- Grand Theft Auto: San Andreas
- Grand Theft Auto: Vice City
- Grand Theft Auto: Vice City Stories
- Gun
- Happy Feet
- Harry Potter and the Chamber of Secrets
- Harry Potter and the Goblet of Fire
- Harry Potter and the Order of the Phoenix
- Harry Potter and the Prisoner of Azkaban
- Harry Potter: Quidditch World Cup
- Hitman 2: Silent Assassin
- Hulk
- Ice Age 2: The Meltdown
- Jak and Daxter: The Precursor Legacy
- Jak II: Renegade
- Jak 3
- Jak X
- Juiced
- Killzone
- Kingdom Hearts
- Kingdom Hearts II
- Kung Fu Panda
- Lara Croft Tomb Raider: Anniversary
- Lara Croft Tomb Raider: Legend
- Lara Croft Tomb Raider: The Angel of Darkness
- LEGO Indiana Jones: The Original Adventures
- LEGO Star Wars: The Video Game
- LEGO Star Wars II: The Original Trilogy
- Madagascar
- Madagascar: Escape 2 Africa
- Manhunt
- Max Payne
- Max Payne 2: The Fall of Max Payne
- Medal of Honor: European Assault
- Medal of Honor: Frontline
- Medal of Honor: Rising Sun
- Medal of Honor: Vanguard
- Metal Gear Solid 2: Sons of Liberty
- Metal Gear Solid 3: Snake Eater
- Midnight Club: Street Racing
- Midnight Club II
- Mortal Kombat: Deadly Alliance
- MotoGP
- MotoGP 3
- MotoGP 4
- MTV Music Generator 2
- MX vs. ATV Unleashed
- Need for Speed: Carbon
- Need for Speed: Most Wanted
- Need for Speed: ProStreet
- Need for Speed: Underground
- Need for Speed: Underground 2
- Oni
- Onimusha: Warlords
- Over The Hedge
- Pirates of the Caribbean: The Legend of Jack Sparrow
- Prince of Persia: The Sands of Time
- Prince of Persia: The Two Thrones
- Prince of Persia: Warrior Within
- Pro Evolution Soccer
- Pro Evolution Soccer 2
- Pro Evolution Soccer 3
- Pro Evolution Soccer 4
- Pro Evolution Soccer 5
- Pro Evolution Soccer 6
- Pro Evolution Soccer 2008
- Pro Evolution Soccer 2009
- Pro Evolution Soccer 2010
- Pro Evolution Soccer 2011
- Ratchet: Gladiator
- Ratchet & Clank
- Ratchet & Clank 2: Locked and Loaded
- Ratchet & Clank 3
- Rayman: Raving Rabbids
- Rayman: Revolution
- Rayman 3: Hoodlum Havoc
- Red Faction
- Resident Evil 4
- Resident Evil: Code Veronica X
- Resident Evil: Outbreak
- Ricky Ponting International Cricket 2005
- Rugby 2004
- Scarface: The World Is Yours
- Scooby-Doo! Mystery Mayhem
- Shadow the Hedgehog
- Shrek 2
- Shrek The Third
- Silent Hill 2: Director's Cut
- Smash Court Tennis Pro Tournament 2
- Smuggler's Run
- SOCOM: U.S. Navy SEALs
- SOCOM II: U.S. Navy SEALs
- SOCOM 3: U.S. Navy SEALs
- Sonic Heroes
- Sonic: Mega Collection Plus
- Soulcalibur III
- Spider-Man
- Spider-Man 2
- Spider-Man 3
- Spyro: A Hero's Tail
- Spyro: Enter the Dragonfly
- SSX
- SSX 3
- SSX: on Tour
- SSX: Tricky
- Star Wars: Battlefront
- Star Wars: Battlefront II
- Star Wars: Episode III: Revenge of the Sith
- Star Wars: Starfighter
- Star Wars: The Force Unleashed
- State of Emergency
- Stuntman
- Tekken 4
- Tekken 5
- Tekken Tag Tournament
- The Chronicles of Narnia: The Lion, The Witch and The Wardrobe
- The Getaway
- The Getaway: Black Monday
- The Godfather
- The Incredibles
- The Legend of Spyro: A New Beginning
- The Lord of the Rings: The Fellowship of the Ring
- The Lord of the Rings: The Return of the King
- The Lord of the Rings: The Third Age
- The Lord of the Rings: The Two Towers
- The Simpsons Game
- The Simpsons: Hit & Run
- The Sims
- The Sims: Bustin' Out
- The Sims 2
- The Sims 2: Castaway
- The Sims 2: Pets
- The Urbz: Sims in the City
- The Warriors
- This Is Football 2002
- This Is Football 2003
- This Is Football 2005
- Tiger Woods PGA Tour 2004
- Tiger Woods PGA Tour 2005
- TimeSplitters
- ToCA Race Driver
- ToCA Race Driver 2
- ToCA Race Driver 3
- Tom Clancy's Splinter Cell
- Tom Clancy's Splinter Cell: Chaos Theory
- Tom Clancy's Splinter Cell: Double Agent
- Tom Clancy's Splinter Cell: Pandora Tomorrow
- Tony Hawk's American Wasteland
- Tony Hawk's Pro Skater 3
- Tony Hawk's Pro Skater 4
- Tony Hawk's Underground
- Tony Hawk's Underground 2
- Tourist Trophy: The Real Riding Simulator
- Transformers: The Game
- True Crime: New York City
- True Crime: Streets of LA
- Ultimate Spider-Man
- V-Rally 3
- World Rally Championship
- WRC II Extreme
- WRC 3: The Official Game of the FIA World Rally Championship
- WRC 4: The Official Game of the FIA World Rally Championship
- WRC: Avec Sébastien Loeb Édition 2005
- WRC: Rally Evolved
- WWE SmackDown! Here Comes the Pain
- WWE SmackDown! Just Bring It
- WWE SmackDown! Shut Your Mouth
- WWE SmackDown! vs. RAW
- WWE SmackDown! vs. RAW 2006
- WWE SmackDown! vs. RAW 2007
- WWE SmackDown! vs. RAW 2008
- WWE Smackdown! vs. RAW 2009
- WWE Smackdown! vs. RAW 2010
- WWE Smackdown! vs. RAW 2011
- XIII

=== PlayStation 3 titles ===
- Army of Two
- Army of Two: The 40th Day
- Assassin's Creed
- Assassin's Creed II – Game of the Year Edition
- Assassin's Creed: Brotherhood
- Assassin's Creed: Revelations
- Avatar: The Game
- Batman: Arkham Asylum
- Battlefield: Bad Company
- Battlefield: Bad Company 2
- BioShock
- BioShock 2
- Borderlands – Game of the Year Edition
- Burnout Paradise: The Ultimate Box
- Call of Duty 3
- Call of Duty 4: Modern Warfare
- Call of Duty: Modern Warfare 2
- Call of Duty: Black Ops
- Call of Duty: World at War
- Colin McRae: Dirt
- Colin McRae: Dirt 2
- Dante's Inferno
- Dead Space 2
- DiRT 3: Complete Edition
- Dragon Age: Origins
- Driver: San Francisco
- EyePet Move Edition
- Fallout 3
- Far Cry 2
- FIFA 08
- FIFA 09
- FIFA 10
- FIFA 11
- FIFA Street 3
- Fight Night Round 4
- Final Fantasy XIII
- God of War III
- Gran Turismo 5 Prologue
- Gran Turismo 5
- Grand Theft Auto IV: The Complete Edition
- HAZE
- Heavenly Sword
- Heavy Rain: Move Edition
- Homefront – Ultimate Edition
- Infamous
- Infamous 2
- Just Cause 2
- Killzone 2
- Killzone 3
- LittleBigPlanet – Game of the Year Edition
- LittleBigPlanet 2
- Mafia II
- Medal of Honor
- Metal Gear Solid 4: Guns of the Patriots
- Midnight Club: Los Angeles – Complete Edition
- ModNation Racers
- MotorStorm
- MotorStorm: Apocalypse
- MotorStorm: Pacific Rift
- Naruto Shippuden: Ultimate Ninja Storm 2
- Need for Speed: Hot Pursuit
- Need for Speed: ProStreet
- Need for Speed: Shift
- Portal 2
- Prince of Persia
- Pro Evolution Soccer 2009
- Pro Evolution Soccer 2010
- Pro Evolution Soccer 2011
- Pro Evolution Soccer 2012
- Prototype
- Race Driver: Grid – Reloaded
- Ratchet & Clank: Tools of Destruction
- Ratchet & Clank: A Crack in Time
- Ratchet & Clank: All 4 One
- Red Dead Redemption
- Resident Evil 5
- Resistance: Fall of Man
- Resistance 2
- Resistance 3
- Ridge Racer 7
- Saints Row 2
- Sniper: Ghost Warrior
- Soulcalibur IV
- Star Wars: The Force Unleashed
- Street Fighter IV
- Tekken 6
- The Elder Scrolls IV: Oblivion – GOTY Edition
- The Sims 3
- Tom Clancy’s Rainbow Six: Vegas
- Tom Clancy's Rainbow Six: Vegas 2
- Tomb Raider: Underworld
- UFC Undisputed 2009
- UFC Undisputed 2010
- Uncharted: Drake's Fortune
- Uncharted 2: Among Thieves
- Virtua Tennis 3
- WWE SmackDown! vs. Raw 2008
- WWE SmackDown! vs. Raw 2009
- WWE SmackDown! vs. Raw 2010
- WWE SmackDown vs. Raw 2011
- WWE '12 Wrestlemania Edition

=== PlayStation Portable titles ===
- Ace Combat X: Skies of Deception
- Ape Academy
- Armored Core: Formula Front
- Ben 10: Protector of Earth
- Brothers in Arms: D-Day
- Burnout Legends
- Call of Duty: Roads to Victory
- Cars
- Chessmaster: The Art of Learning
- Chili Con Carnage
- Colin McRae Rally 2005
- Crash Tag Team Racing
- Crisis Core: Final Fantasy VII
- Daxter
- Dissidia: Final Fantasy
- Dragon Ball Z: Shin Budokai
- Dragon Ball Z: Shin Budokai 2
- Driver 76
- Everybody's Golf
- FIFA 06
- FIFA 07
- FIFA 08
- FIFA 09
- FIFA 10
- FIFA 11
- FIFA 12
- FIFA 13
- FIFA 14
- FIFA Street 2
- Fired Up
- Formula One 06
- Formula One Grand Prix
- Gangs of London
- Go! Sudoku
- God of War: Chains of Olympus
- God of War: Ghost of Sparta
- Gottlieb Pinball Classics
- Grand Theft Auto: Liberty City Stories
- Grand Theft Auto: Vice City Stories
- Gran Turismo
- Harry Potter and the Order of the Phoenix
- Harry Potter and the Half-Blood Prince
- Jak and Daxter: The Lost Frontier
- James Cameron's Avatar: The Game
- Killzone: Liberation
- Harry Potter and the Goblet of Fire
- Lego Batman: The Videogame
- Lego Indiana Jones: The Original Adventures
- Lego Star Wars II: The Original Trilogy
- Lemmings
- LittleBigPlanet
- LocoRoco
- LocoRoco 2
- Lumines
- Medal of Honor: Heroes
- Medal of Honor: Heroes 2
- MediEvil: Resurrection
- Metal Gear Solid: Peace Walker
- Metal Gear Solid: Portable Ops
- Midnight Club 3: DUB Edition
- Midnight Club: L.A. Remix
- ModNation Racers
- MotoGP
- MotorStorm: Arctic Edge
- MX vs. ATV Reflex
- Namco Museum Battle Collection
- Naruto: Ultimate Ninja Heroes
- Need for Speed Carbon: Own The City
- Need for Speed: Most Wanted 5-1-0
- Need for Speed: ProStreet
- Need for Speed: Shift
- Need for Speed: Undercover
- Need for Speed: Underground Rivals
- Peter Jackson's King Kong: The Official Game of the Movie
- Prince of Persia: Revelations
- Prince of Persia: Rival Swords
- Pro Evolution Soccer 2009
- Pro Evolution Soccer 2010
- Pro Evolution Soccer 2011
- Pro Evolution Soccer 5
- Pro Evolution Soccer 6
- Pursuit Force
- Pursuit Force: Extreme Justice
- Ratchet & Clank: Size Matters
- Resistance: Retribution
- Ridge Racer
- Ridge Racer 2
- Rocky Balboa
- Secret Agent Clank
- Sega Mega Drive Collection
- Smash Court Tennis 3
- SOCOM U.S. Navy SEALs: Fireteam Bravo 2
- Sonic Rivals
- Sonic Rivals 2
- SoulCalibur: Broken Destiny
- Star Wars: Battlefront II
- Star Wars: Lethal Alliance
- Star Wars: The Force Unleashed
- Syphon Filter: Dark Mirror
- Tekken: Dark Resurrection
- Tekken 6
- The Simpsons Game
- The Sims 2
- The Sims 2: Castaway
- The Sims 2: Pets
- TOCA Race Driver 2
- Tomb Raider: Anniversary
- Tomb Raider: Legend
- Tom Clancy's Rainbow Six: Vegas
- Tom Clancy's Splinter Cell: Essentials
- Transformers: The Game
- Virtua Tennis: World Tour
- Wipeout Pulse
- Wipeout Pure
- World Tour Soccer: Challenge Edition
- Worms: Open Warfare
- WRC: FIA World Rally Championship
- WWE SmackDown vs. Raw 2006
- WWE SmackDown vs. Raw 2007
- WWE SmackDown vs. Raw 2008
- WWE SmackDown vs. Raw 2009
- WWE SmackDown vs. Raw 2010

== List of Essentials range games ==
=== PlayStation 3 titles ===
- Ace Combat: Assault Horizon
- Assassin's Creed
- Assassin's Creed II – Game of the Year Edition
- Assassin's Creed III
- Assassin's Creed IV: Black Flag
- Assassin's Creed: Brotherhood
- Assassin's Creed: Revelations
- Assassin's Creed: Rogue
- Avatar: The Game
- Batman: Arkham Asylum – GOTY Edition
- Batman: Arkham City – GOTY Edition
- Battlefield 3
- Battlefield 4
- Battlefield: Bad Company 2 – Ultimate Edition
- Battlefield Hardline
- Bayonetta
- Bioshock Infinite
- Borderlands 2
- Brothers in Arms: Hell's Highway
- Burnout Paradise: The Ultimate Box
- Call of Duty 4: Modern Warfare
- Call of Duty: Modern Warfare 3
- Call of Juarez: Bound in Blood
- Call of Juarez: The Cartel
- Cars 2
- Conflict: Denied Ops
- Crysis 2
- Crysis 3
- DanceStar Party
- Dante's Inferno
- Darksiders
- Dark Souls
- Dark Souls: Prepare to Die Edition
- Dark Souls II
- Dead or Alive 5
- Dead Island Game Of The Year Edition
- Dead Island Riptide Complete Edition
- Dead Rising 2
- Dead Rising 2: Off the Record
- Demon's Souls
- Dead Space 3
- Deus Ex: Human Revolution
- Devil May Cry 4
- Devil May Cry HD Collection
- DiRT 3: Complete Edition
- Dirt: Showdown
- Dishonored
- Dishonored: Game of the Year Edition
- DmC: Devil May Cry
- Dragon Age: Inquisition
- Dragon Age: Origins
- Dragon Age II
- Dragon Ball: Raging Blast 2
- Dragon Ball Z: Ultimate Tenkaichi
- Dragon Ball Xenoverse
- Dragon's Dogma: Dark Arisen
- Driver: San Francisco
- Duke Nukem Forever
- Enslaved: Odyssey to the West
- Eyepet & Friends
- F1 2012
- F1 2013
- F1 2014
- Fallout 3: Game of the Year Edition
- Fallout: New Vegas Ultimate Edition
- Far Cry 2
- Far Cry 3
- Far Cry 4
- Farming Simulator 15
- FIFA 12
- FIFA 13
- FIFA 14
- FIFA 15
- FIFA 16
- FIFA 17
- FIFA 18
- FIFA Street
- Final Fantasy X / Final Fantasy X-2 HD Remaster
- Final Fantasy XIII
- God of War Collection
- God of War Collection – Volume II
- God of War III
- Grand Theft Auto IV: Episodes from Liberty City
- Grand Theft Auto IV: The Complete Edition
- Gran Turismo 5
- Grid 2
- Grid Autosport
- Heavy Rain: Move Edition
- Heavenly Sword
- Hitman: Absolution
- Homefront – Ultimate Edition
- Infamous
- Infamous 2
- Just Cause 2
- Kane & Lynch 2: Dog Days
- Killzone 2
- Killzone 3
- Kingdom Hearts HD 1.5 ReMIX
- Kingdom Hearts HD 2.5 ReMIX
- L.A. Noire: The Complete Edition
- Lego Batman: The Video Game
- Lego Batman 2: DC Super Heroes
- Lego Batman 3: Beyond Gotham
- Lego Harry Potter: Years 1-4
- Lego Harry Potter: Years 5-7
- Lego Indiana Jones: The Original Adventures
- Lego Indiana Jones 2: The Adventure Continues
- Lego Marvel Super Heroes
- Lego Pirates of the Caribbean: The Video Game
- Lego Star Wars: The Complete Saga
- Lego Star Wars III: The Clone Wars
- Lego The Hobbit
- Lego The Lord of the Rings
- LittleBigPlanet – Game of the Year Edition
- LittleBigPlanet 2
- LittleBigPlanet Karting
- Lost Planet 2
- Mafia II
- MAG
- Mass Effect 3
- Max Payne 3
- Medal of Honor: Warfighter
- Medieval Moves
- Midnight Club: Los Angeles – Complete Edition
- ModNation Racers
- Mortal Kombat vs. DC Universe
- Mortal Kombat Komplete Edition
- MotorStorm
- MotorStorm: Apocalypse
- MotorStorm: Pacific Rift
- Move Fitness
- Naruto: Ultimate Ninja Storm
- Naruto Shippuden: Ultimate Ninja Storm 2
- Naruto Shippuden: Ultimate Ninja Storm 3 Full Burst
- Naruto Shippuden: Ultimate Ninja Storm Generations
- Need for Speed: Hot Pursuit
- Need for Speed: Most Wanted – A Criterion Game
- Need for Speed: Rivals – Complete Edition
- Need for Speed: The Run
- Ninja Gaiden Sigma 2
- Ninja Gaiden 3
- Ni No Kuni: Wrath of the White Witch
- One Piece: Pirate Warriors
- One Piece: Pirate Warriors 2
- Payday 2
- PlayStation All-Stars Battle Royale
- Portal 2
- Prince of Persia
- Prince of Persia: The Forgotten Sands
- Pro Evolution Soccer 2013
- Pro Evolution Soccer 2014
- Pro Evolution Soccer 2015
- Prototype
- Race Driver: Grid – Reloaded
- Rage
- Red Dead Redemption: Game of the Year Edition
- Rayman Origins
- Rayman Legends
- Ratchet & Clank: A Crack In Time
- Ratchet & Clank Future: Tools of Destruction
- Remember Me
- Resident Evil 5: Gold Edition
- Resident Evil 6
- Resident Evil Operation Raccoon City
- Resident Evil: Revelations
- Resident Evil: Revelations 2
- Resistance: Fall of Man
- Resistance 2
- Resistance 3
- Saints Row 2
- Saints Row: The Third
- Saints Row: The Third – The Full Package
- SEGA Mega Drive Ultimate Collection
- Shadow of Mordor
- Skate 3
- Sleeping Dogs
- Sniper Elite V2
- Sniper: Ghost Warrior
- Sniper: Ghost Warrior 2
- Sonic & Sega All-Stars Racing
- Sonic & All-Stars Racing Transformed
- Sonic Generations
- Sonic Unleashed
- Sorcery
- Soulcalibur IV
- Soulcalibur V
- South Park: The Stick of Truth
- Sports Champions
- Sports Champions 2
- Start the Party!
- SSX
- Starhawk
- Star Wars: The Force Unleashed – Ultimate Sith Edition
- Star Wars: The Force Unleashed II
- Street Fighter X Tekken
- Super Street Fighter IV Arcade Edition
- Tekken 6
- Tekken Tag Tournament 2
- The Amazing Spider-Man
- The Elder Scrolls IV: Oblivion – GOTY Edition
- The Elder Scrolls V: Skyrim
- The Elder Scrolls V: Skyrim – Legendary Edition
- The Evil Within
- The Lego Movie Videogame
- The Fight
- Thief
- Tomb Raider: Underworld
- Tomb Raider
- Tom Clancy's Ghost Recon Advanced Warfighter 2
- Tom Clancy's Ghost Recon: Future Soldier
- Tom Clancy's HAWX
- Tom Clancy's Rainbow Six: Vegas 2
- Tom Clancy's Splinter Cell: Double Agent
- Tom Clancy's Splinter Cell Blacklist
- Toy Story 3: The Video Game
- Uncharted: Drake's Fortune
- Uncharted 2: Among Thieves
- Uncharted 3: Drake's Deception
- Vanquish
- Viking: Battle for Asgard
- Virtua Fighter 5
- Virtua Tennis 4
- Watch Dogs
- Wolfenstein: The New Order
- WWE 12 Wrestlemania Edition
- WWE 13

=== PlayStation Portable titles ===
- Ace Combat X: Skies of Deception
- Ace Combat: Joint Assault
- Ape Academy
- Ape Escape P
- Army of Two: The 40th Day
- Assassin's Creed: Bloodlines
- ATV Offroad Fury Pro
- Avatar: The Legend of Aang
- Bakugan Battle Brawlers: Defenders of the Core
- Ben 10: Protector of Earth
- Ben 10: Alien Force
- Ben 10 Alien Force: Vilgax Attacks
- Ben 10 Ultimate Alien: Cosmic Destruction
- BlazBlue: Calamity Trigger
- Breath of Fire III
- Brothers in Arms: D-Day
- Burnout Legends
- Burnout Dominator
- Buzz!: Brain Bender
- Buzz! Brain of the UK
- Buzz!: Master Quiz
- Buzz! Quiz World
- Buzz!: The Ultimate Music Quiz
- Capcom Puzzle World
- Capcom Classics Collection Reloaded
- Capcom Classics Collection Remixed
- Cars
- Cars 2
- Cloudy with a Chance of Meatballs
- Crash of the Titans
- Crash: Mind Over Mutant
- Crash Tag Team Racing
- Dante's Inferno
- Darkstalkers Chronicle: The Chaos Tower
- Daxter
- Despicable Me (video game)
- Dissidia: Final Fantasy
- Dissidia 012: Final Fantasy
- Disney Hannah Montana: Rock Out the Show
- Dragon Ball Z: Shin Budokai
- Dragon Ball Z: Shin Budokai 2
- Dragon Ball Z: Tenkaichi Tag Team
- Driver '76
- echochrome
- echoshift
- Everybody's Golf
- Everybody's Golf 2
- Everybody's Tennis
- Exit
- EyePet
- F1 2009
- Fat Princess
- FIFA 09
- FIFA 10
- FIFA 11
- FIFA 12
- FIFA 13
- FIFA 14
- FIFA Street 2
- Fight Night Round 3
- Final Fantasy
- Final Fantasy II
- Final Fantasy IV: The Complete Collection
- Final Fantasy Tactics: The War of the Lions
- Gangs of London
- Gradius Collection
- G-Force
- Generation of Chaos
- Geronimo Stilton in the Kingdom of Fantasy
- Geronimo Stilton: Return to the Kingdom of Fantasy
- Gladiator Begins
- God of War: Chains of Olympus
- God of War: Ghost of Sparta
- Gods Eater Burst
- Gottlieb Pinball Classics
- Gran Turismo
- Guilty Gear XX Accent Core Plus
- Harry Potter and the Goblet of Fire
- Harry Potter and the Order of the Phoenix
- Harry Potter and the Half-Blood Prince
- Invizimals
- Invizimals: The Lost Tribes
- Invizimals: Shadow Zone
- Iron Man
- Iron Man 2
- Jak & Daxter: The Lost Frontier
- Juiced 2: Hot Import Nights
- Key of Heaven
- Killzone: Liberation
- LEGO Batman: The Video Game
- LEGO Harry Potter: Years 1–4
- LEGO Harry Potter: Years 5–7
- LEGO Indiana Jones 2: The Adventure Continues
- LEGO Pirates of the Caribbean: The Video Game
- LEGO Star Wars III: The Clone Wars
- Lemmings
- LittleBigPlanet
- LocoRoco
- LocoRoco 2
- Lord of Arcana
- Marvel Super Hero Squad
- Medal of Honor: Heroes
- Medal of Honor: Heroes 2
- MediEvil: Resurrection
- Mega Minis Volume 1
- Mega Minis Volume 2
- Mega Minis Volume 3
- Mega Man Maverick Hunter X
- Metal Gear Acid
- Metal Gear Solid: Portable Ops
- ModNation Racers
- Monster Hunter Freedom
- Monster Hunter Freedom 2
- Monster Hunter Freedom Unite
- Mortal Kombat: Unchained
- MotorStorm: Arctic Edge
- MX vs. ATV: Reflex
- Namco Museum Battle Collection
- Naruto: Ultimate Ninja Heroes 2: The Phantom Fortress
- Naruto Shippuden: Ultimate Ninja Heroes 3
- Naruto Shippuden: Kizuna Drive
- Naruto Shippuden: Legends: Akatsuki Rising
- Naruto Shippuden: Ultimate Ninja Impact
- NBA Live 09
- NHL 07
- Need for Speed Carbon: Own The City
- Need for Speed: Most Wanted 5-1-0
- Need for Speed: ProStreet
- Need for Speed: Underground Rivals
- Need for Speed: Shift
- Need for Speed: Undercover
- Open Season
- PaRappa The Rapper
- Patapon
- Patapon 2
- Patapon 3
- Peter Jackson's King Kong: The Official Game of the Movie
- Petz My Baby Hamster
- Petz My Puppy Family
- Phantasy Star Portable
- Pocket Racers
- Pirates of the Caribbean: Dead Man's Chest
- Pirates of the Caribbean: At World's End
- Power Stone Collection
- Prince of Persia Revelations
- Prince of Persia Rival Swords
- Prince of Persia: The Forgotten Sands
- Pursuit Force
- Pursuit Force Extreme Justice
- Ratchet & Clank: Size Matters
- Ratatouille
- Resistance: Retribution
- Secret Agent Clank
- Sega Mega Drive Collection
- Sega Rally
- Shaun White Snowboarding
- Sid Meier's Pirates!
- Silent Hill: Origins
- Silent Hill: Shattered Memories
- Skate Park City
- SOCOM U.S. Navy SEALs: Fireteam Bravo 3
- Sonic Rivals
- Sonic Rivals 2
- SoulCalibur: Broken Destiny
- Spider-Man 3
- Spider-Man: Web of Shadows
- Split/Second Velocity
- Space Invaders Extreme
- SpongeBob SquarePants: The Yellow Avenger
- SpongeBob's Truth or Square
- Street Fighter Alpha 3 MAX
- SSX on Tour
- Star Wars: Battlefront II
- Star Wars Battlefront: Renegade Squadron
- Star Wars Battlefront: Elite Squadron
- Star Wars The Clone Wars: Republic Heroes
- Star Wars: The Force Unleashed
- Super Monkey Ball Adventure
- Surf's Up
- Syphon Filter: Dark Mirror
- Syphon Filter: Logan's Shadow
- Tactics Ogre: Let Us Cling Together
- Tekken: Dark Resurrection
- Tekken 6
- Tenchu: Shadow Assassins
- Test Drive Unlimited
- The Mystery Team
- The Sims 2
- The Sims 2: Castaway
- The Sims 2: Pets
- Tiger Woods PGA Tour 10
- TMNT
- Tron: Evolution
- Tomb Raider: Anniversary
- Tomb Raider: Legend
- Tom Clancy's EndWar
- Tom Clancy's Ghost Recon Advanced Warfighter 2
- Tom Clancy's Rainbow Six: Vegas
- Tom Clancy's Splinter Cell: Essentials
- Tony Hawk's Project 8
- Tony Hawk's Underground 2: Remix
- Transformers: Revenge of the Fallen
- The 3rd Birthday
- Tomb Raider: Legend
- Toy Story 3: The Video Game
- UFC Undisputed 2010
- Up
- Valkyria Chronicles II
- WALL-E
- Warhammer 40,000: Squad Command
- Wipeout Pulse
- Wipeout Pure
- Worms: Open Warfare
- Worms: Open Warfare 2
- WWE All Stars
- WWE SmackDown vs. Raw 2011
- X-Men Origins: Wolverine

== List of PlayStation Hits range games ==
=== PlayStation 4 (PAL) ===
- Assassin's Creed IV: Black Flag
- Batman: Arkham Knight
- Bloodborne
- Dishonored 2
- Doom
- Dragon Ball Xenoverse
- Dragon Ball Xenoverse 2
- DriveClub
- Dynasty Warriors 8: Xtreme Legends Complete Edition
- Dynasty Warriors 9
- Earth Defense Force 4.1: The Shadow of New Despair
- Fallout 4
- Fist of the North Star: Lost Paradise
- God of War
- God of War III Remastered
- Gran Turismo Sport
- Gundam Versus
- Horizon Zero Dawn
- Horizon Zero Dawn: Complete Edition
- inFamous: Second Son
- Injustice 2
- Killzone: Shadow Fall
- LEGO Batman 3: Beyond Gotham
- LittleBigPlanet 3
- Mad Max
- Metal Gear Solid V: The Definitive Experience
- Middle-earth: Shadow of Mordor
- Monster Hunter: World
- Mortal Kombat X
- Naruto Shippuden: Ultimate Ninja Storm 4
- Need for Speed
- Need for Speed Payback
- Need for Speed Rivals
- Nioh
- One Piece: Pirate Warriors 3
- Plants vs. Zombies: Garden Warfare 2
- Project Cars
- Ratchet & Clank
- Rayman Legends
- Resident Evil 6
- Resident Evil VII: Biohazard
- Street Fighter V
- Tales of Berseria
- Terraria
- The Evil Within
- The Last of Us Remastered
- UFC 2
- UFC 3
- Uncharted 4: A Thief's End
- Uncharted: The Lost Legacy
- Uncharted: The Nathan Drake Collection
- Until Dawn
- Watch Dogs
- Wolfenstein: The New Order
- Yakuza 0
- Yakuza Kiwami 2
- Yakuza 6: The Song of Life
