= List of Naruto video games =

Naruto video games have appeared for various consoles, PC and mobiles from Nintendo, Sony, Microsoft, Apple and Google, based on Masashi Kishimoto's manga and anime. Most of them are fighting games in which the player directly controls one of a roster of various characters as featured in the series' Parts I and II. The player pits their character against another character controlled by the game's AI or by another player, depending on the mode the player is in. The objective is to reduce the opponent's health to zero using basic attacks and special techniques unique to each character derived from techniques they use in the Naruto anime or manga. The first Naruto video game was Naruto: Konoha Ninpōchō, which was released in Japan on March 27, 2003, for the WonderSwan Color. Most Naruto video games have been released only in Japan. The first games released outside Japan were the Naruto: Gekitou Ninja Taisen series and the Naruto: Saikyou Ninja Daikesshu series, released in North America under the titles of Naruto: Clash of Ninja and Naruto: Ninja Council.

In 2025, Bandai Namco announced that Naruto video games have sold over 37.86 million copies worldwide.

== Series ==
=== Naruto: Clash of Ninja ===
The Naruto: Clash of Ninja series (known in Japan as Naruto: Gekitō Ninja Taisen) is a series of video games developed by Eighting and published by D3 Publisher and Takara Tomy.

Game	Details
Naruto: Clash of Ninja Original release date(s): JP: April 11, 2003; NA: March 7, 2006	Release years by system: 2003 – GameCube
Naruto: Clash of Ninja Original release date(s): JP: April 11, 2003; NA: March 7, 2006	Notes: Features 8 playable-characters.; First Naruto game to be released in North America, and was announced in tandem with Naruto: Ninja Council, which was released on March 22, 2006.
Naruto: Clash of Ninja 2 Original release date(s): JP: December 4, 2003; NA: September 26, 2006; EU: November 24, 2006	Release years by system: 2003 – GameCube
Naruto: Clash of Ninja 2 Original release date(s): JP: December 4, 2003; NA: September 26, 2006; EU: November 24, 2006	Notes: Released as Naruto: Gekitō Ninja Taisen! 2 in Japan.; Released as Naruto: Clash of Ninja – European Version in Europe.; Features 20 playable characters.
Naruto: Gekitō Ninja Taisen! 3 Original release date(s): JP: November 20, 2004	Release years by system: 2004 – GameCube
Naruto: Gekitō Ninja Taisen! 3 Original release date(s): JP: November 20, 2004	Notes: Later released on the Wii under the new title Naruto: Clash of Ninja Revolution; Features 29 characters.
Naruto: Gekitō Ninja Taisen! 4 Original release date(s): JP: November 21, 2005	Release years by system: 2005 – GameCube
Naruto: Gekitō Ninja Taisen! 4 Original release date(s): JP: November 21, 2005	Notes: Final Naruto game to be published by Tomy Dream Energy before merger with Takara.; Features 36 playable characters.
Naruto Shippūden: Gekitō Ninja Taisen! EX Original release date(s): JP: February 22, 2007	Release years by system: 2007 – Wii
Naruto Shippūden: Gekitō Ninja Taisen! EX Original release date(s): JP: February 22, 2007	Notes: First Naruto game for the Wii.; Features 14 playable characters.
Naruto: Clash of Ninja Revolution Original release date(s): NA: October 23, 2007; EU: March 28, 2008; AU: May 8, 2008	Release years by system: 2007 – Wii
Naruto: Clash of Ninja Revolution Original release date(s): NA: October 23, 2007; EU: March 28, 2008; AU: May 8, 2008	Notes: Enhanced port of Naruto: Gekitou Ninja Taisen 3.; Features 20 playable characters.
Naruto Shippūden: Gekitō Ninja Taisen! EX 2 Original release date(s): JP: November 29, 2007	Release years by system: 2007 – Wii
Naruto Shippūden: Gekitō Ninja Taisen! EX 2 Original release date(s): JP: November 29, 2007	Notes: Features 27 playable characters.
Naruto: Clash of Ninja Revolution 2 Original release date(s): NA: October 21, 2008; EU: November 12, 2008; AU: February 13, 2009	Release years by system: 2008 – Wii
Naruto: Clash of Ninja Revolution 2 Original release date(s): NA: October 21, 2008; EU: November 12, 2008; AU: February 13, 2009	Features 36 playable characters.; Story mode features canon content not shown in the Manga or Anime.
Naruto Shippūden: Gekitō Ninja Taisen! EX 3 Original release date(s): JP: November 27, 2008	Release years by system: 2008 – Wii
Naruto Shippūden: Gekitō Ninja Taisen! EX 3 Original release date(s): JP: November 27, 2008	Notes: Features 32 playable characters.
Naruto Shippuden: Clash of Ninja Revolution 3 Original release date(s): NA: November 17, 2009; EU: April 9, 2010	Release years by system: 2009 – Wii
Naruto Shippuden: Clash of Ninja Revolution 3 Original release date(s): NA: November 17, 2009; EU: April 9, 2010	Notes: European version features additional bug-fixes and minor gameplay re-balancing, as well as Japanese voice-acting instead of English.; Features 38 playable characters.
Naruto Shippūden: Gekitō Ninja Taisen! Special Original release date(s): JP: December 2, 2010	Release years by system: 2010 – Wii
Naruto Shippūden: Gekitō Ninja Taisen! Special Original release date(s): JP: December 2, 2010	Notes: Features 38 playable characters.

=== Naruto: Ninja Council ===
Game	Details
Naruto: Ninja Council Original release date(s): JP: May 1, 2003; NA: March 22, 2006	Release years by system: 2003 – Game Boy Advance
Naruto: Ninja Council Original release date(s): JP: May 1, 2003; NA: March 22, 2006	Notes: Second Naruto game to be released in North America, announced in tandem with Naruto: Clash of Ninja.; Developed by Arc System Works
Naruto: Ninja Council 2 Original release date(s): JP: April 29, 2004; NA: October 4, 2006	Release years by system: 2004 – Game Boy Advance
Naruto: Ninja Council 2 Original release date(s): JP: April 29, 2004; NA: October 4, 2006	Notes: Released as Naruto: Saikyō Ninja Daikesshu 2 in Japan.; Developed by Aspect Co.
Naruto: Ninja Council 2 European Version Original release date(s): JP: April 21, 2005; EU: October 3, 2008	Release years by system: 2005 – Nintendo DS
Naruto: Ninja Council 2 European Version Original release date(s): JP: April 21, 2005; EU: October 3, 2008	Notes: First Naruto game for the Nintendo DS.; Released as Naruto: Saikyō Ninja Daikesshu 3 in Japan.; Not released in North America.
Naruto: Ninja Council 3 Original release date(s): JP: April 27, 2006; NA: May 22, 2007; EU: October 5, 2007	Release years by system: 2006 – Nintendo DS
Naruto: Ninja Council 3 Original release date(s): JP: April 27, 2006; NA: May 22, 2007; EU: October 5, 2007	Notes: Released as Naruto: Ninja Council – European Version in Europe.; Released in Japan as Naruto: Saikyō Ninja Daikesshu 4 DS.
Naruto Shippūden: Ninja Council 4 Original release date(s): JP: July 19, 2007; NA: June 2, 2009; EU: September 18, 2009	Release years by system: 2007 – Nintendo DS
Naruto Shippūden: Ninja Council 4 Original release date(s): JP: July 19, 2007; NA: June 2, 2009; EU: September 18, 2009	Notes: Released as Naruto Shippuden: Saikyō Ninja Daikesshu 5 Kessen! "Akatsuki" in Japan.; The only entrie of the Ninja Council series to featured online multiplayer via Nintendo Wi-Fi Connection.
Naruto Shippūden: Naruto vs. Sasuke Original release date(s): JP: July 4, 2008; NA: November 16, 2010	Release years by system: 2008 – Nintendo DS
Naruto Shippūden: Naruto vs. Sasuke Original release date(s): JP: July 4, 2008; NA: November 16, 2010	Notes: Released as Naruto Shippuden: Saikyou Ninja Daikesshu Gekitotsu!! Naruto vs. Sasuke in Japan.
Naruto Shippuden: Shinobi Rumble Original release date(s): JP: April 22, 2010; NA: February 8, 2011	Release years by system: 2010 – Nintendo DS
Naruto Shippuden: Shinobi Rumble Original release date(s): JP: April 22, 2010; NA: February 8, 2011	Notes: Released as Naruto Shippūden: Ninjutsu Zenkai! Cha-Crash!! in Japan.; Features 16 playable characters.; Not released in Europe.
Naruto Shippuden 3D: The New Era Original release date(s): JP: March 31, 2011; EU: June 17, 2011; AU: July 7, 2011	Release years by system: 2011 – Nintendo 3DS
Naruto Shippuden 3D: The New Era Original release date(s): JP: March 31, 2011; EU: June 17, 2011; AU: July 7, 2011	Notes: First Naruto game for the Nintendo 3DS.; Released as Naruto Shippuden Shinobi Rittai Emaki! Saikyô Ninkai Kessen in Japan.; Not released in North America.

=== Naruto: Ninja Destiny ===
Game	Details
Naruto: Ninja Destiny Original release date(s): JP: December 14, 2006; EU: February 15, 2008; NA: February 26, 2008; AU: March 20, 2008	Release years by system: 2006 – Nintendo DS
Naruto: Ninja Destiny Original release date(s): JP: December 14, 2006; EU: February 15, 2008; NA: February 26, 2008; AU: March 20, 2008	Notes: Released in Japan as Naruto: Shinobi Retsuden.; North American and European versions have different story. The original story from the Japanese version (with a new storyline added) was published in Europe as Ninja Destiny 2 European version.; Features 16 playable characters (including 3 extra characters for North American and European versions).
Naruto Shippuden: Ninja Destiny 2 Original release date(s): JP: April 24, 2008; EU: April 3, 2009; NA: September 15, 2009	Release years by system: 2008 – Nintendo DS
Naruto Shippuden: Ninja Destiny 2 Original release date(s): JP: April 24, 2008; EU: April 3, 2009; NA: September 15, 2009	Notes: Released in Japan as Naruto Shippuden: Shinobi Retsuden 2.; Released in Europe as Ninja Destiny 2 European version and takes the story from Naruto: Shinobi Retsuden (with a new story added), features 7 exclusive characters.
Naruto Shippuden: Shinobi Retsuden 3 Original release date(s): JP: April 28, 2009	Release years by system: 2009 – Nintendo DS
Naruto Shippuden: Shinobi Retsuden 3 Original release date(s): JP: April 28, 2009	Notes: Exclusively released in Japan.; Features 30 playable characters.

=== Naruto: Path of the Ninja ===
Game	Details
Naruto: Path of the Ninja Original release date(s): JP: July 22, 2004; NA: October 23, 2007	Release years by system: 2004 – Game Boy Advance; 2007 – Nintendo DS
Naruto: Path of the Ninja Original release date(s): JP: July 22, 2004; NA: October 23, 2007	Notes: With the release of the game, Nintendo released a bundle set which included a limited edition orange Game Boy Advance with a Konoha leaf on it.; Released in Japan as Naruto RPG: Uketsugareshi Hi no Ishi for Game Boy Advance.; Released in North America as Naruto: Path of the Ninja for Nintendo DS.; Developed by Tose
Naruto RPG 2: Chidori vs. Rasengan Original release date(s): JP: July 14, 2005	Release years by system: 2005 – Nintendo DS
Naruto RPG 2: Chidori vs. Rasengan Original release date(s): JP: July 14, 2005	Notes: Exclusively released in Japan.; EN patch fully released 2 September 2024.
Naruto: Path of the Ninja 2 Original release date(s): JP: July 13, 2006; NA: October 15, 2008	Release years by system: 2006 – Nintendo DS
Naruto: Path of the Ninja 2 Original release date(s): JP: July 13, 2006; NA: October 15, 2008	Notes: Released as Naruto RPG 3: Reijū vs. Konoha Shōtai in Japan.; Non-canon story

=== Naruto: Uzumaki Chronicles ===
Game	Details
Naruto: Uzumaki Chronicles Original release date(s): JP: August 18, 2005; NA: August 22, 2006; EU: May 25, 2007; AU: June 15, 2007	Release years by system: 2005 – PlayStation 2
Naruto: Uzumaki Chronicles Original release date(s): JP: August 18, 2005; NA: August 22, 2006; EU: May 25, 2007; AU: June 15, 2007	Notes: Released in Japan as Naruto: Uzumaki Ninden.; Content of North American & European versions was extensively altered to match the airing of the English-dubbed version of the anime in English-speaking territories. Certain characters, missions and cutscenes were either altered or removed entirely.
Naruto: Uzumaki Chronicles 2 Original release date(s): JP: November 16, 2006; NA: September 4, 2007; EU: March 7, 2008; AU: March 2008	Release years by system: 2006 – PlayStation 2
Naruto: Uzumaki Chronicles 2 Original release date(s): JP: November 16, 2006; NA: September 4, 2007; EU: March 7, 2008; AU: March 2008	Notes: Released in Japan as Naruto: Konoha Spirits
Naruto Shippūden: Legends: Akatsuki Rising Original release date(s): EU: September 24, 2009; AU: October 2, 2009; NA: October 6, 2009	Release years by system: 2009 – PlayStation Portable
Naruto Shippūden: Legends: Akatsuki Rising Original release date(s): EU: September 24, 2009; AU: October 2, 2009; NA: October 6, 2009	Notes: Not released in Japan.; You can see titles box art bottom in Chinese.
Naruto Shippūden: Kizuna Drive Original release date(s): JP: July 15, 2010; NA: March 22, 2011; EU: March 25, 2011; AU: March 31, 2011	Release years by system: 2010 – PlayStation Portable
Naruto Shippūden: Kizuna Drive Original release date(s): JP: July 15, 2010; NA: March 22, 2011; EU: March 25, 2011; AU: March 31, 2011	Notes: Non-canon story

=== Naruto: Ultimate Ninja ===
Game	Details
Naruto: Ultimate Ninja Original release date(s): JP: October 23, 2003; EU: June 23, 2006; NA: June 26, 2006; AU: November 17, 2006	Release years by system: 2003 – PlayStation 2
Naruto: Ultimate Ninja Original release date(s): JP: October 23, 2003; EU: June 23, 2006; NA: June 26, 2006; AU: November 17, 2006	Notes: Released in Japan as Naruto: Narutimate Hero.; North American release originally announced on October 10, 2005.
Naruto: Ultimate Ninja 2 Original release date(s): JP: September 30, 2004; NA: June 12, 2007; EU: October 19, 2007; AU: October 26, 2007	Release years by system: 2004 – PlayStation 2
Naruto: Ultimate Ninja 2 Original release date(s): JP: September 30, 2004; NA: June 12, 2007; EU: October 19, 2007; AU: October 26, 2007	Notes: Released as Naruto: Narutimate Hero 2 in Japan.
Naruto: Ultimate Ninja 3 Original release date(s): JP: December 22, 2005; NA: March 25, 2008; AU: September 12, 2008; EU: September 15, 2008	Release years by system: 2005 – PlayStation 2
Naruto: Ultimate Ninja 3 Original release date(s): JP: December 22, 2005; NA: March 25, 2008; AU: September 12, 2008; EU: September 15, 2008	Notes: Released in Japan as Naruto: Narutimate Hero 3
Naruto: Ultimate Ninja Heroes 2: The Phantom Fortress Original release date(s): JP: March 30, 2006; NA: June 24, 2008; EU: July 11, 2008; AU: July 18, 2008	Release years by system: 2006 – PlayStation Portable
Naruto: Ultimate Ninja Heroes 2: The Phantom Fortress Original release date(s): JP: March 30, 2006; NA: June 24, 2008; EU: July 11, 2008; AU: July 18, 2008	Notes: First Naruto game for PSP.; Released in Japan as Naruto: Narutimate Portable Castle of Illusion
Naruto Shippūden: Ultimate Ninja 4 Original release date(s): JP: April 5, 2007; NA: March 24, 2009; EU: May 1, 2009; AU: May 7, 2009	Release years by system: 2007 – PlayStation 2
Naruto Shippūden: Ultimate Ninja 4 Original release date(s): JP: April 5, 2007; NA: March 24, 2009; EU: May 1, 2009; AU: May 7, 2009	Notes: Released in Japan as Naruto Shippūden: Narutimate Accel.
Naruto: Ultimate Ninja Heroes Original release date(s): NA: August 28, 2007; EU: September 14, 2007; AU: November 17, 2007	Release years by system: 2007 – PlayStation Portable
Naruto: Ultimate Ninja Heroes Original release date(s): NA: August 28, 2007; EU: September 14, 2007; AU: November 17, 2007	Notes: Not released in Japan.; First English Naruto game released for PlayStation Portable.
Naruto Shippuden: Ultimate Ninja 5 Original release date(s): JP: December 20, 2007; EU: November 27, 2009; AU: December 3, 2009	Release years by system: 2007 – PlayStation 2
Naruto Shippuden: Ultimate Ninja 5 Original release date(s): JP: December 20, 2007; EU: November 27, 2009; AU: December 3, 2009	Notes: Released as Naruto Shippuden: Narutimate Accel 2 in Japan.; Second and final Naruto Shippuden game released for PlayStation 2.; Not released in North America.
Naruto: Ultimate Ninja Storm Original release date(s): NA: November 4, 2008; EU: November 7, 2008; AU: November 20, 2008; JP: January 15, 2009	Release years by system: 2008 – PlayStation 3 · 2017 – PlayStation 4, Xbox One and Microsoft Windows · 2018 – Nintendo Switch · 2024 – Android, iOS
Naruto: Ultimate Ninja Storm Original release date(s): NA: November 4, 2008; EU: November 7, 2008; AU: November 20, 2008; JP: January 15, 2009	Notes: First Naruto video game to be playable in high-definition.; First Naruto game released for the 7th generation of video game consoles.; Initially an exclusive for the PlayStation 3, later re-released as a part of the compilations Naruto Shippuden: Ultimate Ninja Storm Trilogy/Legacy released on PlayStation 4, Xbox One, PC and Nintendo Switch.; Features 25 playable characters
Naruto Shippuden: Ultimate Ninja Heroes 3 Original release date(s): JP: December 10, 2009; NA: May 11, 2010; EU: May 14, 2010; AU: May 20, 2010	Release years by system: 2009 – PlayStation Portable
Naruto Shippuden: Ultimate Ninja Heroes 3 Original release date(s): JP: December 10, 2009; NA: May 11, 2010; EU: May 14, 2010; AU: May 20, 2010	Notes: Released as Naruto Shippuden: Narutimate Accel 3 in Japan.
Naruto Shippūden: Ultimate Ninja Storm 2 Original release date(s): AU: October 14, 2010; EU: October 15, 2010; NA: October 19, 2010; JP: October 21, 2010	Release years by system: 2010 – PlayStation 3, Xbox 360 · 2017 – PlayStation 4, Xbox One and Microsoft Windows · 2018 – Nintendo Switch
Naruto Shippūden: Ultimate Ninja Storm 2 Original release date(s): AU: October 14, 2010; EU: October 15, 2010; NA: October 19, 2010; JP: October 21, 2010	Notes: Features 42 playable characters.; First Naruto fighting game to feature online-multiplayer.; Re-released as part of the compilations Naruto Shippuden: Ultimate Ninja Storm Trilogy/Legacy
Naruto Shippuden: Ultimate Ninja Impact Original release date(s): NA: October 18, 2011; JP: October 20, 2011; EU: November 11, 2011; AU: November 24, 2011	Release years by system: 2011 – PlayStation Portable
Naruto Shippuden: Ultimate Ninja Impact Original release date(s): NA: October 18, 2011; JP: October 20, 2011; EU: November 11, 2011; AU: November 24, 2011	Notes: Released as Naruto Shippuden: Narutimate Impact in Japan.
Naruto Shippuden: Ultimate Ninja Storm Generations Original release date(s): JP: February 23, 2012; NA: March 13, 2012; AU: March 29, 2012; EU: March 30, 2012	Release years by system: 2012 – PlayStation 3 and Xbox 360
Naruto Shippuden: Ultimate Ninja Storm Generations Original release date(s): JP: February 23, 2012; NA: March 13, 2012; AU: March 29, 2012; EU: March 30, 2012	Notes: Released in Japan as Naruto Shippuden: Narutimate Storm Generations.; Features 72 playable characters and 15 support-only characters.
Naruto Shippuden: Ultimate Ninja Storm 3 Original release date(s): NA: March 5, 2013; EU: March 8, 2013; AU: March 8, 2013; JP: April 18, 2013	Release years by system: 2013 – PlayStation 3, Xbox 360 and Microsoft Windows · 2017 – PlayStation 4, Xbox One · 2018 – Nintendo Switch
Naruto Shippuden: Ultimate Ninja Storm 3 Original release date(s): NA: March 5, 2013; EU: March 8, 2013; AU: March 8, 2013; JP: April 18, 2013	Notes: First Naruto game released for Microsoft Windows.; Features 80 playable characters and 7 support-only characters; A re-release of the game, titled Naruto Shippuden: Ultimate Ninja Storm 3 Full Burst, was released in October 2013.; Re-released in 2017 as part of the compilation Naruto Shippuden: Ultimate Ninja Storm Trilogy/Legacy
Naruto Shippuden: Ultimate Ninja Storm Revolution Original release date(s): JP: September 11, 2014; EU: September 12, 2014; NA: September 16, 2014	Release years by system: 2014 – PlayStation 3, Xbox 360 and Microsoft Windows
Naruto Shippuden: Ultimate Ninja Storm Revolution Original release date(s): JP: September 11, 2014; EU: September 12, 2014; NA: September 16, 2014	Features 100 playable characters and 14 support-only characters.
Naruto Shippuden: Ultimate Ninja Storm 4 Original release date(s): JP: February 4, 2016; EU: February 5, 2016; NA: February 9, 2016	Release years by system: 2016 – PlayStation 4, Xbox One and Microsoft Windows · 2020 – Nintendo Switch
Naruto Shippuden: Ultimate Ninja Storm 4 Original release date(s): JP: February 4, 2016; EU: February 5, 2016; NA: February 9, 2016	Notes: First Naruto game released for the 8th generation of video game consoles.; Features 108 playable characters (not including DLC); support-only characters removed entirely; An expansion titled Road to Boruto was released in February 2017.
Naruto Shippuden: Ultimate Ninja Storm Trilogy/Legacy Original release date(s): JP: July 27, 2017; WW: July 27, 2017	Release years by system: 2017 – PlayStation 4, Xbox One, Microsoft Windows and Nintendo Switch
Naruto Shippuden: Ultimate Ninja Storm Trilogy/Legacy Original release date(s): JP: July 27, 2017; WW: July 27, 2017	Notes: Remastered version of three Naruto: Ultimate Ninja Storm games (Naruto: Ultimate Ninja Storm, Naruto Shippuden: Ultimate Ninja Storm 2, and Naruto Shippuden: Ultimate Ninja Storm 3: Full Burst).; A physical western release, titled Naruto Shippuden: Ultimate Ninja Storm Legacy, contains the three games as well as Naruto Shippuden: Ultimate Ninja Storm 4: Road to Boruto, and was made available for PlayStation 4, Xbox One, and Microsoft Windows (not released on Nintendo Switch) on August 25, 2017.
Naruto x Boruto: Ultimate Ninja Storm Connections Original release date(s): JP: November 16, 2023; EU: November 17, 2023; NA: November 17, 2023	Release years by system: 2023 – PlayStation 4, PlayStation 5, Xbox One, Xbox Series X/S, Microsoft Windows and Nintendo Switch
Naruto x Boruto: Ultimate Ninja Storm Connections Original release date(s): JP: November 16, 2023; EU: November 17, 2023; NA: November 17, 2023	Notes: First Naruto game released for the 9th generation of video game consoles.

== Arcade games ==
Game	Details
Naruto: Ultimate Ninja Card Battle Original release date(s):	Release years by system:
Naruto: Ultimate Ninja Card Battle Original release date(s):	Notes: Released as Narutimate Card Battle in Japan
Naruto Shippūden: Ultimate Ninja Mission Original release date(s): 2007	Release years by system: 2007 – Arcade

== Other games ==
Game	Details
Naruto: Konoha Ninpouchou Original release date(s): JP: March 27, 2003	Release years by system: 2003 – WonderSwan Color
Naruto: Konoha Ninpouchou Original release date(s): JP: March 27, 2003	Notes: The sole Naruto game to appear on a Bandai console.
Naruto: Shinobi no Sato no Jintori Kassen Original release date(s): JP: June 26, 2003	Release years by system: 2003 – PlayStation
Naruto: Shinobi no Sato no Jintori Kassen Original release date(s): JP: June 26, 2003	Notes: Digital tabletop game
Naruto: Konoha Senki Original release date(s): JP: September 12, 2003	Release years by system: 2003 – Game Boy Advance
Naruto: Konoha Senki Original release date(s): JP: September 12, 2003	Notes: Developed by Amedio Co., Ltd.
Naruto: Rise of a Ninja Original release date(s): NA: October 30, 2007; AU: November 1, 2007; EU: November 2, 2007	Release years by system: 2007 – Xbox 360
Naruto: Rise of a Ninja Original release date(s): NA: October 30, 2007; AU: November 1, 2007; EU: November 2, 2007	Notes: First Naruto game released on the Xbox 360.; First Naruto game developed by a non-Japanese company.; Includes non-canon content
Naruto Shippūden: Dairansen! Kage Bunshin Emaki Original release date(s): JP: February 14, 2008	Release years by system: 2008 – Nintendo DS
Naruto Shippūden: Dairansen! Kage Bunshin Emaki Original release date(s): JP: February 14, 2008	Notes: Exclusively released in Japan and Korea.
Naruto: The Broken Bond Original release date(s): NA: November 18, 2008; AU: November 20, 2008; EU: November 21, 2008	Release years by system: 2008 – Xbox 360
Naruto: The Broken Bond Original release date(s): NA: November 18, 2008; AU: November 20, 2008; EU: November 21, 2008	Notes: Second Naruto game developed by a non-Japanese company.; Includes non-canon content.
Naruto Shippuden: Dragon Blade Chronicles Original release date(s): JP: November 26, 2009; NA: November 16, 2010; EU: November 19, 2010	Release years by system: 2009 – Wii
Naruto Shippuden: Dragon Blade Chronicles Original release date(s): JP: November 26, 2009; NA: November 16, 2010; EU: November 19, 2010	Notes: Released as Naruto Shippūden: Ryujinki in Japan.; Non-canon story
Naruto Powerful Shippuden Original release date(s): JP: November 29, 2012; NA: March 5, 2013; EU: March 18, 2013; AU: March 8, 2013	Release years by system: 2012 – Nintendo 3DS
Naruto Powerful Shippuden Original release date(s): JP: November 29, 2012; NA: March 5, 2013; EU: March 18, 2013; AU: March 8, 2013	Notes: Based on the Naruto spin-off series, Naruto SD: Rock Lee no Seishun Full-Power Ninden.
[[ |Naruto Online]] Original release date(s): CHN: 2013; WW: July 20, 2016	Release years by system: 2013 – Microsoft Windows
Naruto Mobile Original release date(s): CHN: 2016	Release years by system: 2016 – Android, iOS
Naruto Mobile Original release date(s): CHN: 2016	Notes: Chinese only game
Naruto x Boruto: Ninja Voltage Original release date(s): November 22, 2017	Release years by system: 2017 – iOS, Android
Naruto x Boruto: Ninja Voltage Original release date(s): November 22, 2017	Notes: It has received 35 million downloads between November 2017 and March 2021.
Naruto to Boruto: Shinobi Striker Original release date(s): WW: August 31, 2018	Release years by system: 2018 – PlayStation 4, Xbox One, Microsoft Windows
Naruto to Boruto: Shinobi Striker Original release date(s): WW: August 31, 2018	Notes: The first Naruto games, featuring Boruto Uzumaki as a main character.
Boruto: Borutical Generations Original release date(s): 2019	Release years by system: 2019 – Mobile Phone

== Related games ==
Game	Details
Jump Super Stars Original release date(s): JP: August 8, 2005	Release years by system: 2005 – Nintendo DS
Jump Super Stars Original release date(s): JP: August 8, 2005	Notes: Features characters from various manga serialized in the Weekly Shonen Jump magazine.
Battle Stadium D.O.N. Original release date(s): JP: July 20, 2006	Release years by system: 2006 – GameCube, PlayStation 2
Battle Stadium D.O.N. Original release date(s): JP: July 20, 2006	Notes: Cross-over fighting game featuring characters from Dragon Ball Z, One Piece and Naruto.
Jump Ultimate Stars Original release date(s): JP: November 23, 2006	Release years by system: 2006 – Nintendo DS
Jump Ultimate Stars Original release date(s): JP: November 23, 2006	Notes: Features characters from various manga serialized in the Weekly Shonen Jump magazine.
J-Stars Victory VS Original release date(s): JP: March 19, 2014; EU: June 26, 2015; NA: June 30, 2015	Release years by system: 2014 – PlayStation 3, PlayStation Vita · 2015 – PlayStation 4
J-Stars Victory VS Original release date(s): JP: March 19, 2014; EU: June 26, 2015; NA: June 30, 2015	Notes: Published by Namco Bandai Games, developed by Spike Chunsoft.; Features characters from various manga serialized in the Weekly Shonen Jump magazine.; North American and European versions feature an additional Arcade Mode.; First Naruto game released on the PlayStation Vita.
Jump Force Original release date(s): JP: February 14, 2019; WW: February 15, 2019	Release years by system: 2019 – PlayStation 4, Xbox One, Microsoft Windows
Fortnite Original release date(s): JP: July 25, 2017; WW: July 25, 2017	Release years by system: 2017 – PlayStation 4, Xbox One, Microsoft Windows / 2018 – Nintendo Switch / 2020 – PlayStation 5, Xbox Series X and Series S
Fortnite Original release date(s): JP: July 25, 2017; WW: July 25, 2017	Notes: Fortnite x Naruto: Shippuden collaboration kicked off on November 16, 2021 and made iconic team 7 skins available (Naruto, Sasuke, Sakura, and Kakashi) in the game.; it's also Fortnite's first crossover with an anime franchise.; a second collaboration "Naruto Shippuden Rivals" was released on June 23, 2022 that added skins for Itachi, Orochimaru, Hinata, and Gaara.
Free Fire Original release date(s): JP: December 8, 2017; WW: December 8, 2017	Release years by system: 2017 – Android, iOS, iPadOS
Free Fire Original release date(s): JP: December 8, 2017; WW: December 8, 2017	Notes: Free Fire (video game) x Naruto: Shippuden collaboration kicked off on January 10, 2025 and made iconic team 7 skins available (Naruto, Sasuke, Sakura, and Kakashi) in the game.
Mobile Legends: Bang Bang Original release date(s): JP: July 14, 2016; WW: July 14, 2016	Release years by system: 2016 – Android, iOS
Mobile Legends: Bang Bang Original release date(s): JP: July 14, 2016; WW: July 14, 2016	Notes: Mobile Legends: Bang Bang x Naruto: Shippuden collaboration kicked off on May 2, 2025 and made 5 legendary character skins available (Naruto, Sasuke, Sakura, Kakashi and Gaara) in the game
eFootball Original release date(s): JP: September 30, 2021; WW: September 30, 2021	Release years by system: 2021 – Microsoft Windows, Xbox One, Xbox Series X/S, PlayStation 4, PlayStation 5; 2022 – Android, iOS
eFootball Original release date(s): JP: September 30, 2021; WW: September 30, 2021	Notes: eFootball x Naruto: Shippuden collaboration kicked off on April 30, 2026 and made 11 character/player cards available, including Naruto (Neymar Jr. and Marcelo), Sasuke (Takefusa Kubo and Gareth Bale), Shikamaru (Martin Ødegaard), Kakashi (Robert Lewandowski), and Minato (Pierre-Emerick Aubameyang) and four AC Milan player cards represent Akatsuki, including Itachi (Luka Modrić), Deidara (Rafael Leão), Obito (Christian Pulisic) and Pain (Alexis Saelemaekers), as well as many skins to custom the stadium such as Kurama and Susano'o giant props, stadium choreo, kick-off projection and goal projection in the game.
Monster Strike Original release date(s): JP: August 8, 2013; WW: October 20, 2014	Release years by system: 2013 – Android, iOS
Monster Strike Original release date(s): JP: August 8, 2013; WW: October 20, 2014	Notes: Monster Strike x Naruto: Shippuden collaboration kicked off on June 12, 2026 and during the event, characters from Naruto Shippuden appeared across collaboration gachas, quests, login rewards, mission clear rewards, and more.
PUBG Mobile Original release date(s): JP: March 19, 2018; WW: March 19, 2018	Release years by system: 2018 – Android, iOS, iPadOS, HarmonyOS
PUBG Mobile Original release date(s): JP: March 19, 2018; WW: March 19, 2018	Notes: PUBG Mobile x Naruto: Shippuden collaboration launched globally on July 9, 2026, bringing an immersive shinobi-themed update to the battle royale game. And collaboration features 9 main characters available (Naruto, Sasuke, Kakashi, Sakura, Hinata, Gaara, Jiraiya, Tsunade and Madara) as playable character outfits and skin sets.
