= Naruto Ninja Council 2 =

2004 video game

- North American cover art featuring main protagonist Naruto Uzumaki
- Developers: Aspect; Tomy
- Publishers: JP: Tomy; NA: D3 Publisher
- Series: Naruto: Ninja Council
- Platform: Game Boy Advance
- Release: April 29, 2004: JP: April 29, 2004; NA: October 4, 2006
- Genre: Beat-'Em-Up
- Modes: Single-player, multiplayer

Naruto: Ninja Council 2 (known as Naruto: Saikyō Ninja Daikesshu 2 (ＮＡＲＵＴＯ－ナルト- 最強忍者大結集2, lit. "Naruto: Great Council of the Strongest Ninja 2") in Japan) is an action video game, released for Game Boy Advance and is the second installment in the Ninja Council series. It is based on the popular manga and anime series Naruto by Masashi Kishimoto and is developed by Aspect and Tomy and published by D3 Publisher and Tomy.

== Gameplay ==
A screenshot from the game featuring Naruto and 2 enemy sound ninja

Naruto: Ninja Council 2 is side-scroller game in which the player has to advance through a 2D level while fighting enemy ninja. The levels vary from the original anime locals like Akagahara and the third exam stadium to some new settings like a cave system. The player is able to double-jump and teleport up and sideways to get to places that are normally out of reach. The game also features special levels in which the character's speed doubles and is asked to run through the whole level while collecting leaf symbols in a specific time. The playable characters are Naruto Uzumaki, Sasuke Uchiha and Sakura Haruno, and it is also possible to unlock Rock Lee. The player is able to swap between characters using the left trigger, and each one has a separate life bar, however when a health package is picked up by one character, it affects the whole party. In certain points of the game however, the player is not able to switch between one or two of the characters, which results in a higher difficulty level.

Combat is performed by using the attack button continuously. Jutsus can be performed by a simple combination of movement and attack buttons. Each character (Besides Lee) has three sets of Jutsus: Naruto can use his sexy jutsu, summoning jutsu and "Uzumaki Barrage". Sasuke is able to use his Sharingan (写輪眼; lit. "Copy Wheel Eye", English manga: "Mirror Wheel Eye"), "Lion Barrage" and Chidori (千鳥; lit. "One Thousand Birds"). Sakura's jutsus are Speed boost, "Chaa!!" Barrage and timed "Chaa!!" Barrage. Ninja tools can also be acquired, and they are thrown using the attack button. Using scrolls that are scattered throughout the levels will result in one of the anime characters to appear and perform one of his Jutsus.

== Plot ==
A cutscene from Naruto: Ninja Council 2

Ninja Council 2 is based on the anime series episodes 22 to 80, however, it also features a new mission in which the three ninjas are asked to deliver a scroll. Orochimaru steals the scroll and while attempting to retrieve the scroll the player finds out that Orochimaru requested the scroll in the first place only to watch Sasuke.
The game's story is told via cut-scenes. In these cut-scenes, the character who is speaking is shown by a large picture of them on the top of the screen while the dialogue is presented as a text on the bottom of the screen. It also features two multiplayer modes which are played via GBA Link Cable: Versus and Co-Op.

== Reception ==
Reception

Aggregate score
Aggregator	Score
Metacritic	55/100

Review scores
Publication	Score
Famitsu	26/40
GameSpy	2/5
GameZone	7.3/10
IGN	5/10
Nintendo Power	5.5/10
Nintendo World Report	6.5/10

The game received "mixed" reviews according to the review aggregation website Metacritic.

== See also ==
- List of Naruto video games
- Naruto anime and manga
