= MotoGP 3 =

- North American box art, featuring Namco's Hitomi Yoshino and Valentino Rossi character in the background
- Developer: Namco
- Publishers: JP: Namco; NA: Namco Hometek; EU: Sony Computer Entertainment
- Composers: Hiroto Sasaki; Tetsukazu Nakanishi; Rio Hamamoto; Go Shiina
- Platform: PlayStation 2
- Release: JP: February 27, 2003; NA: March 18, 2003; EU: May 2, 2003
- Genre: Racing
- Modes: Single-player, multiplayer

MotoGP 3 (often stylized as MotoGP3) is a 2003 racing video game developed and published by Namco for the PlayStation 2. It is the third in Namco's series of MotoGP video games, which coincided with the THQ series for a number of years.

== Gameplay ==
The gameplay is very similar to past games by Namco, like MotoGP (PS2) and MotoGP 2. MotoGP 3 is based on the 2002 Grand Prix motorcycle racing season, but with the introduction of four stroke bikes, the gameplay has some slight differences. The new 990cc 4-stroke bikes are faster but harder to handle, while the 500cc 2-strokes are slower but slightly better to handle.

MotoGP 3 has far more tracks than the previous game, with 15 real world courses which include Phillip Island Grand Prix Circuit, Paul Ricard, Motegi and Mugello. There are also a combination of fantasy layouts. When starting the game up for the first time, players can create a custom rider. After that, they will be brought to the menu screen where they can access a number of options. The first is arcade, where the players can choose the bike they wish to ride, number of laps, weather, difficulty and settings to do a race. Season mode puts them into a season with any team (depending on difficulty) and the player races on a combination of circuits to try and win the championship. Time Trial is like Arcade, except that rather than racing against a number of opponents for a number of laps, the player races against the clock to try to get the best time for as long as desired. Challenge mode is a series of challenges that players can play. They range from beating another rider, riding between cones, setting a specific lap time in Time Trial or winning a race at a specific track. Completing challenges will unlock riders, movies and pictures. Multiplayer allows players to race against up to four other people. Legends mode is, like Time Trial, similar to Arcade mode, except rather than facing riders from 2002, they face riders from past seasons, including the likes of Kevin Schwantz, Wayne Gardner and Mick Doohan to name a few.

== Riders ==
=== 2002 ===
Team	Constructor	Machine	No.	Rider 1	No.	Rider 2
Antena 3 Yamaha d'Antin	Yamaha	Yamaha YZR500	6	Norick Abe	20	Pere Riba
Fortuna Honda Gresini	Honda	Honda NSR500/Honda RC211V	74	Daijiro Kato	None	None
Gauloises Yamaha Tech 3	Yamaha	Yamaha YZR500	19	Olivier Jacque	56	Shinya Nakano
Kanemoto Racing	Honda	Honda NSR500	17	Jurgen van den Goorbergh	None	None
Marlboro Yamaha	Yamaha	Yamaha YZR-M1	3	Max Biaggi	7	Carlos Checa
MS Aprilia Racing	Aprilia	Aprilia RS Cube	55	Régis Laconi	None	None
Pramac Honda	Honda	Honda NSR500	31	Tetsuya Harada	None	None
Proton Team KR	Proton KR	Proton KR3	9	Nobuatsu Aoki	99	Jeremy McWilliams
Red Bull Yamaha WCM	Yamaha	Yamaha YZR500	8	Garry McCoy	21	John Hopkins
Repsol Honda Team	Honda	Honda RC211V	11	Tohru Ukawa	46	Valentino Rossi
Telefónica Movistar Suzuki	Suzuki	Suzuki GSV-R	10	Kenny Roberts	15	Sete Gibernau
West Honda Pons	Honda	Honda NSR500/Honda RC211V (Barros Only)	4	Alex Barros	65	Loris Capirossi

=== Legends ===
Team	Constructor	Machine	No.	Rider
Marlboro Yamaha	Yamaha	Yamaha YZR500	1	Wayne Rainey
Lucky Strike Suzuki	Suzuki	Suzuki RGV500	1	Kevin Schwantz
Repsol Honda Team	Honda	Honda NSR500	1	Mick Doohan
Rothmans Honda	Honda	Honda NSR500	5	Wayne Gardner

=== Fantasy ===
The game also includes fictional riders based on Namco game franchises. Susumu Hori is only available in the PAL and Japanese version of the game.

Team	Constructor	Machine	No.	Rider
Namco Team	Unknown	Unknown	J	Jack Slate
Namco Team	Unknown	Namco-drillmach1	0	Susumu Hori
Namco Team	Unknown	Namco-nfr990h	76	Hitomi Yoshino

== Circuits ==
The game features 15 circuits based on the 2002 season of MotoGP.

Circuit	Country	Grand Prix
Suzuka	Japan	Grand Prix of Japan
Paul Ricard	France	Grand Prix de France (1999)
Jerez	Spain	Gran Premio de España
Donington	United Kingdom	British Grand Prix
Motegi	Japan	Pacific Grand Prix
Mugello	Italy	Gran Premio d'Italia
Catalunya	Spain	Gran Premio de España
Assen	Netherlands	Dutch TT
Le Mans	France	Grand Prix de France (2002)
Sachsenring	Germany	Grand Prix Deutschland
Brno	Czech Republic	Grand Prix České republiky
Estoril	Portugal	Grande Premio de Portugal
Valencia	Spain	Gran Premio de España
Phillip Island	Australia	Australian Grand Prix
Sepang	Malaysia	Malaysian Grand Prix

== Reception ==
Reception

Aggregate score
Aggregator	Score
Metacritic	80/100

Review scores
Publication	Score
Edge	6/10
Electronic Gaming Monthly	8/10
Game Informer	7/10
GamePro	4/5
GameRevolution	B
GameSpot	8.2/10
GameSpy	4/5
GameZone	8.6/10
IGN	8.5/10
Official U.S. PlayStation Magazine	4.5/5

The game received "favorable" reviews according to the review aggregation website Metacritic. MotoGP 3 was successful in Italy: Sony Computer Entertainment Italia reported just under 100,000 sales by March 2004.
