= Lego Indiana Jones: The Original Adventures =

2008 video game

- Cover artwork, featuring the title character wielding his signature whip
- Developers: Traveller's Tales; TT Fusion (DS)
- Publisher: LucasArts
- Director: Jon Burton
- Producer: Steve Wakeman
- Programmer: Glyn Scragg
- Artist: James Cunliffe
- Composer: David Whittaker
- Series: Lego Indiana Jones
- Platforms: Microsoft Windows; Nintendo DS; PlayStation 2; PlayStation 3; PlayStation Portable; Wii; Xbox 360; Mac OS X
- Release: NA: 3 June 2008; AU: 4 June 2008; EU: 6 June 2008; Mac OS X: WW: 28 November 2008
- Genre: Action-adventure
- Modes: Single-player, multiplayer

Lego Indiana Jones: The Original Adventures is a 2008 Lego-themed action-adventure video game developed by Traveller's Tales and published by LucasArts. Based on the Indiana Jones franchise and the eponymous Lego Indiana Jones toy line, it follows the events of the first three Indiana Jones films: Raiders of the Lost Ark (1981), Temple of Doom (1984), and the Last Crusade (1989). The game allows up to two players to play locally at a time, offers puzzle and platformer aspects, and has 84 playable characters with a variety of special abilities. As the players go through the stages, they collect the currency of Lego games known as Studs, avoid traps, assemble Lego constructions, and engage in combat. Climbing, swinging, and throwing objects as weapons were new inclusions not seen in previous Lego video games by Traveller's Tales.

LucasArts announced the game in 2007, with the developers basing its mechanics on their prior Lego Star Wars games. The design of puzzles was altered to fit the Indiana Jones franchise. Any mentions of Nazism from the franchise were removed, as Lego replaced the figures with characters that resemble them visually in its Indiana Jones Lego sets. Traveller's Tales also attempted to make Lego Indiana Jones more family-friendly. The game was advertised at conventions: a game demo, Flash Player web game, and computer-animated short film were published during the development. Lego Indiana Jones was released for Microsoft Windows, Nintendo DS, PlayStation 2, PlayStation 3, PlayStation Portable (PSP), Wii, and Xbox 360 platforms in June 2008, while Feral Interactive released the Mac OS X version in November 2008. It was made available on the Steam digital distribution service in 2009.

Lego Indiana Jones received generally favourable reviews from critics. Its gameplay, retelling of the films, and co-op mode were commended by reviewers. However, they had conflicting opinions about the second player's artificial intelligence and game mechanics. Reviewers also praised the game's graphics, environments, and soundtrack, but disagreed on the sound effects. The Wii and Xbox 360 versions garnered praise, but the PSP version was criticised for its puzzles, excessive loading times, and lack of multiplayer support. A Java platformer Lego Indiana Jones mobile game was released in 2008 and a sequel, Lego Indiana Jones 2: The Adventure Continues, was released in 2009.

== Gameplay ==
A screenshot of The Original Adventures, featuring three playable characters. The Lego video game follows the story of the first three Indiana Jones films, being retold in a humorous manner.

Lego Indiana Jones: The Original Adventures is an action-adventure video game played from the third-person perspective, in which the player controls a Lego figurine in areas inspired by Indiana Jones film scenes. The game also incorporates aspects of the puzzle and platformer game genres. It is a humorous retelling of Indiana Jones' first three films: Raiders of the Lost Ark (1981), Temple of Doom (1984), and the Last Crusade (1989). The game consists of three chapters, each with six stages (a total of eighteen chapters for all three films), which are accessible from the game's hub, Barnett College. The location serves as Indiana Jones's teaching location in the Last Crusade. The player can also unlock additional content, enable cheats, and examine their own accolades and statistics in various classrooms of the game's hub. Upon selecting a stage, a cutscene appears that introduces the player to the segment of the film being played, such as the boulder escape from Raiders of the Lost Ark and the minecart escape from Temple of Doom.

The game's primary mode is a two-player local co-op game, with 84 playable characters; in the absence of a human partner, the game's artificial intelligence controls the second character. While playing for the first time, the player can only use preselected figures to complete missions; after that, the player can use any other unlocked figure when replaying the game in the freeplay mode. Characters can also be bought in Barnett College, where the player can also personalise characters and make their own creations. These figures can then interact with the environment in ways that others cannot do during the story mode, allowing the player to obtain new items or find new puzzles and collectibles.

As the player progresses through Lego Indiana Jones, they must gather Studs, the currency of Lego games, assemble Lego constructions to make specific items, avoid traps, and take part in combat with enemies. The game's mechanics and engine are similar to the Lego Star Wars video games. Players respawn indefinitely upon death. Through certain stages, the player can also use vehicles and animals to navigate. Additionally, the player can collect Extras (a bonus that boosts their Studs total) by collecting parcels and mailing them to Barnett College, and unlock three bonus levels by collecting treasure in each stage.

Lego Indiana Jones features special abilities for characters to solve puzzles and defeat enemies. For example, Indy can wield his whip to attack or tie up enemies, manipulate objects, or swing from the ceiling; the Wii version of the whip is controlled physically by the player. When Indy is near snakes, his fear prevents him from being productive, forcing the second player to assist him out. The same effect applies to other characters, such as Willie Scott. The game features a variety of characters, including shovel-carrying, wrench-using, high-jumping, and crawlable ones. Thuggee characters can communicate with ancient statues and characters who hold books, such as Henry Jones Sr., can decode hieroglyphs. The abilities to carry a shovel, use a wrench, or decode hieroglyphs can be obtained by any figure who acquires the required item. The player can also obtain weapons and rewards by excavating in certain areas or killing foes, however the weapons have limited ammunition. The ability to climb, swing, and throw objects as weapons were new additions to the Lego video game series.

=== Nintendo DS ===
The Nintendo DS version of Lego Indiana Jones underwent changes to meet the DS's memory and size limits, as well as its touchscreen capabilities. Due to constraints, cutscene details were cut and compressed. Using a digital pen (stylus), the player can control characters' special skills, such as Indy's whip or Satipo's shovel, as well as components like switches. The built-in microphone is used by the player to blow out torches, inflate rubber rafts, and launch the player in air when standing on propellers: this is done by the player blowing into the microphone. The player can also play as Indy and Marion Ravenwood's pet monkey, climbing to previously inaccessible areas. The DS version includes a variety of minigames, including action minigames, tangram, and a cooking minigame where monkey brain dishes are prepared, a reference to Temple of Doom.

== Development ==
Lego Indiana Jones: The Original Adventures was developed by Traveller's Tales and published by LucasArts. The Nintendo DS version was developed by TT Fusion, a subsidiary of Traveller's Tales that also worked on the Lego Star Wars: The Complete Saga in 2007, while the Mac OS X version of Lego Indiana Jones was developed by Robosoft Technologies and published by Feral Interactive. Activision was also involved in publishing Nintendo DS, PlayStation 3, and Xbox 360 versions in Europe. Jon Burton served as the game's director, Steve Wakeman as its producer, Glyn Scragg as the lead game programmer, James Cunliffe as the head of art, and David Whittaker as its composer. During the development, Traveller's Tales parent company, TT Games, was acquired by Warner Bros. Home Entertainment. The acquisition had no negative impact on Traveller's Tales relations with LucasArts or Lego.

The game was heavily based on the Lego Star Wars games and their mechanics. According to Nick Ricks, a Traveller's Tales producer, the development team initially experimented with creating the game on top of Lego Star Wars because the Indiana Jones franchise also featured action components, resulting in what Ricks described as "LEGO Star Wars set in 1945". Traveller's Tales then decided to develop Lego Indiana Jones from its foundation, introducing new features absent in previous Lego Star Wars games. The developers adjusted the design of puzzles due to the absence of the Force in the Indiana Jones series. While working on ranged weapons, the developers debated whether ammunition should be limited. In the official release, they opted to limit ammo for enemy weapon drops, differing from the system used in previous Lego games. Jonathan Smith of TT Games said that the team succeeded in developing a recognisable personality for Lego Indiana Jones while retaining well-received game elements from prior Lego video games.

Shawn Storc of LucasArts said their biggest obstacle during the development was aligning the gameplay and its character mechanics with the films, only focusing on replicating the first three films. Scholars noted that the game is an adaptation of the Lego toy set characters. After their debut, Traveller's Tales announced that they would remove mentions of Nazism from Lego Indiana Jones, citing the fact that Lego replaced Nazi characters with similar "genocidal, occultist, trenchcoat-wearing master-race" characters. Burton expressed the belief that "[the studio] doesn't want to change the game so much that we lose the audience". Traveller's Tales also sought to make the game more family-friendly, considering that children were the target group for Lego video games. Ricks said that the developers discussed whether to include the German Iron Cross. Traveller's Tales improved the second player character mechanics and introduced special abilities that any player character could obtain, in contrast to Lego Star Wars games, where a character's ability could only be possessed by a single character. Another addition to the Lego Indiana Jones is the character's fear effect system, which Ricks regarded as a handy utility that emphasises the use of the second player character's powers when the main player is in danger. Storc saw the characters in Lego Indiana Jones as more athletic than in their prior Lego titles.

In February 2008, LucasArts announced that up to four players would be able to play in co-op mode on consoles; this later turned out to be a miscommunication. LucasArts then clarified that while up to four characters could appear on screen, only two at a time could be player-controlled. Lego Indiana Jones's soundtrack is a mix of John Williams compositions featured in the films and a custom soundtrack inspired by them. The game also incorporated music from The Adventures of Young Indiana Jones television series. Skywalker Sound, a division of Lucasfilm, assisted with game's sound effects and voice acting.

== Marketing and release ==
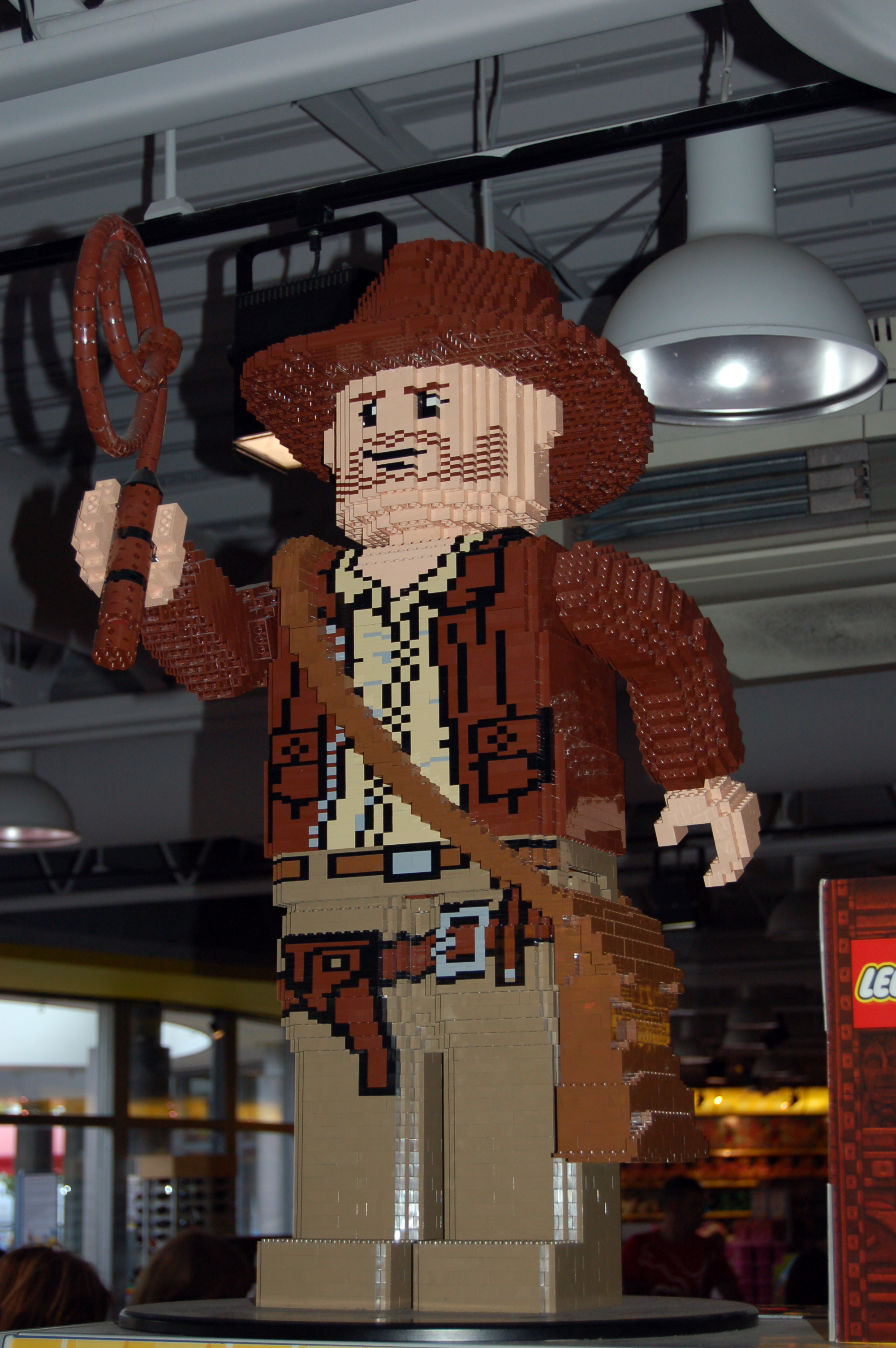
Lego Indiana Jones was extensively promoted at events, through video games, and a short animated film.

The financial success of the Lego Star Wars games series motivated LucasArts to license the Indiana Jones franchise to Traveller's Tales. LucasArts unveiled the game under the working title, Lego Indiana Jones: The Videogame, at San Diego Comic-Con in July 2007, along with the first Indiana Jones Lego toy set for a release of January 2008. To promote the game, Lego Star Wars: The Complete Saga offered Indiana Jones as an unlockable character when it was released in November 2007; the character can be acquired by watching the Lego Indiana Jones trailer in a room next to Cantina. In January 2008, Lego Indiana Jones was announced that it would join the Games for Windows brand line-up. The Lego Group also partnered with the game development studio Three Melons to promote the game by releasing Lego Indiana Jones Adventures, an Adobe Flash Player web game, in February 2008. The game has 2D graphics and auto-scrolling platformer mechanics, with four stages overall, while its menu features a museum where the player could learn about Indy and the stages.

LucasArts also promoted Lego Indiana Jones at several conventions, including the Game Developers Conference in February and the New York Comic Con in April 2008. At the Play.com Live event at Wembley Stadium on 15 and 16 March, Activision made the game playable for attendees. Cartoon Network aired a computer-animated short film, Lego Indiana Jones and the Raiders of the Lost Brick, on 10 May. A demo version of Lego Indiana Jones was released on 13 May 2008, and together with the trailer it was also included in a remastered Paramount Pictures re-release of the first three films in the United States. Although Activision announced that the demo would not be available on PlayStation 3 and Xbox 360, it was made accessible on the Xbox Live Marketplace on 27 June.

The full version of Lego Indiana Jones was released on 3 June 2008 in the United States and Canada for Microsoft Windows, PlayStation 2, PlayStation 3, PlayStation Portable (PSP), Xbox 360, Nintendo DS, and Wii platforms. A day later, Lego Indiana Jones was released in Australia, and on 6 June it was released in Europe. The Xbox 360 version is backward compatible with the Xbox One and the Xbox Series X/S, allowing users to play the game on newer consoles. Shortly prior to its release, the fourth instalment of the Indiana Jones film series, Indiana Jones and the Kingdom of the Crystal Skull, premiered.

In October 2008, Microsoft released a Kung Fu Panda and Lego Indiana Jones bundle for Pro and Elite configurations of Xbox 360. The Mac OS X version of Lego Indiana Jones was internationally released on 28 November. The game, however, does not run on the Mac Mini computers, according to the magazine Macworld. Following its release, Lego Indiana Jones was made available on the Steam digital distribution service on 8 July 2009, on Microsoft's Games on Demand digital distribution service on 27 November 2009, and on PlayStation Now in 2017. Lego Indiana Jones was released in 2014 on PlayStation Vita, the successor of PSP, as part of a package of Lego video games. The game was available for free from 16 to 30 November 2020 for Xbox One, Xbox Series X and Series S users with Xbox Live Gold.

== Reception ==
Reception

Aggregate score
Aggregator	Score
Metacritic	(Xbox 360) 77/100 (PS3) 77/100 (PS2) 77/100 (PSP) 76/100 (PC) 78/100 (Nintendo DS) 80/100 (Wii) 78/100

Review scores
Publication	Score
Eurogamer	7/10
Game Informer	7/10
GamePro	9/10
GameRevolution	8/10
GameSpot	(Xbox 360) 8/10 (PS2) 8/10 (PSP) 7/10 (PC) 8/10 (Nintendo DS) 7/10
Giant Bomb	3/5
IGN	8/10
Official Xbox Magazine (US)	7.5/10
Pocket Gamer	(Nintendo DS) 4.5/5 (PSP) 3.5/5
TeamXbox	8.5/10
The Guardian	4/5
X-Play	4/5
Gry-Online	8/10

Lego Indiana Jones: The Original Adventures received "generally favourable" reviews, according to review aggregator Metacritic. Martin Docherty of GamesRadar+ listed the game as one of the best Indiana Jones video games in 2021, while IGN listed it as one of the best Lego video games in 2023. In a review for MeriStation, Roberto Garcia appreciated the crossover of the Lego and Indiana Jones franchises, adding that the game took advantage of the success of the Kingdom of the Crystal Skull. Paul Freeman, who played the main antagonist René Belloq in Raiders of the Lost Ark, saw Lego Indiana Jones as entertaining.

Reviewers complimented the gameplay of Lego Indiana Jones and its retelling of the films. Writing for IGN, Chris Roper commended the incorporation of characters' phobias and the game's pacing due to the inclusion of new segments not featured in the original films. He highlighted the new segments that have created "bigger separations" between the game and the films than the Lego Star Wars games. In a review for GamePro, Cameron Lewis viewed the minecart escape as one of the most unforgettable parts of Lego Indiana Jones. Reviewers have complimented the game's replayability features. Brad Shoemaker of Giant Bomb saw the gameplay as rough, with Tim Stevens of X-Play saying that it could have been improved with the addition of in-game help for certain puzzles. Reviewers have also praised the co-op mode. Lewis, on the other hand, disliked the absence of an online co-op mode. Writing for GamesRadar, David Houghton saw the first chapter unfavourably due to dull pacing, while the other two he viewed more positively.

Critics had mixed perspectives regarding the game's overall mechanics, commending the overall physics engine, but the AI of the second player and enemies as chaotic. Ben Talbot of Official Xbox Magazine conversely said the AI does its tasks well. Stevens disliked the combat system for not featuring more complex mechanics of Lego Star Wars games, while Andrew Reiner of Game Informer and Shawn Sparks of GameRevolution commended Indy's abilities. Writing for Gry-Online, Marcin Łukański praised the character fear system. Tom McShea of GameSpot complimented the diversity of items that the player can interact with but disliked ranged weapon mechanics. Reviewers have criticised the camera mechanics as troublesome, but had mixed opinions on vehicle missions. Chris Holt of Macworld disliked the respawn system.

The game's graphics have been commended by reviewers, who have primarily commended the environments and characters. Sparks praised Lego Indiana Jones's overall graphics and cutscenes, and commended the addition of Star Wars characters. Reiner also complimented the game's graphics but unfavourably described the game as "Lego Star Wars with an Indiana Jones skin slapped on top of it". A Nintendo Gamer reviewer, however, said that the game is more visually appealing than Lego Star Wars and Lego Batman games. A MeriStation reviewer, Lego Indiana Jones commended the motion blur and dynamic lighting, noting that the looks of original locations in the films retained their identity in the game.

Reviewers also praised Lego Indiana Jones's overall soundtrack but were mixed on the sound effects. Reviewers have commended the film-inspired soundtracks. Regarding sound effects, they were criticised by reviewers. Chea and Neil Davey of The Guardian, however, commended the sound effects. Reiner complimented the snippets of film soundtracks composed by John Williams for "rightfully [burying]" sound effects and characters. Andy Eddy of TeamXbox said that the music is dynamic, changing based on the "intensity of a scene".

=== Console versions ===
Reviewers have commended the looks of the game on the DS version, despite the pixelisation present in textures. Craig Harris of IGN said that despite the loss of graphical quality in cutscenes in the DS version, they provided the appropriate amount of humour that was not present in The Complete Saga. Writing for Pocket Gamer, Mark Walbank praised the design of minigames on the DS version. McShea was not impressed, but still commended them for being well-integrated with the standard gameplay. Garcia also said that actions performed with the stylus in the end become uninteresting and that these same actions can be performed more easily with buttons instead. Martin Robinson of IGN praised the microphone usage in the DS version.

Reviewers criticised the gameplay of the PSP version, with Michael Thomsen of IGN calling it "the worst gameplay-wise" version of the game, due to not featuring multiplayer support, having longer loading times, and because of the PSP's analogue nub controls. McShea said that PSP's small screen size made the gameplay more difficult and foiling. Tracy Erickson of Pocket Gamer criticised the structure of puzzles on the PSP version, saying that each puzzle takes too long to complete.

Thomsen rated the Wii version as the best out of all console versions, due to the console's controls and overall experience. Reviewers reported that the abilities of the Wii Remote were not used to the fullest extent in the game, and have to use the joystick to control the character. Javier Andres Alcala of MeriStation commended the Wii edition's graphics and characters looks.

In comparison with Xbox 360 and PlayStation 3 versions of Lego Star Wars games, Francisco Alberto Serrano Acosta of MeriStation said that the PlayStation 3 version of Lego Indiana Jones is much more spirited and comprehensive. Thomsen complained about framerate issues and screen tearing in the PlayStation 3 version, and instead listed the Xbox 360 version as the best regarding Lego Indiana Jones's graphics, particularly due to the version's lighting, colours, and textures. McShea praised the looks of the Xbox 360, PlayStation 3, and Wii versions of the game.

Thomsen ranked the Xbox 360 and PlayStation 3 versions as the best in regards to Lego Indiana Jones's music and sound effects due to their usage of the Dolby Digital audio compression technology. He ranked the PlayStation 2 and Wii versions lower due to worse compression of Dolby Pro Logic II, and the PSP version behind of the PlayStation and Wii versions. Despite placing the DS version last, Thomsen praised the addition of music despite the low memory of Game Cards, but said that the music sounds worse when played at higher volume. Shaun McInnis of GameSpot commended the sounds of birds and water in the DS version.

=== Sales ===
Shortly after its release, Lego Indiana Jones became the best-selling game in the United Kingdom during the second week of June 2008, surpassing Grand Theft Auto IV, according to Chart-Track. It later returned to being the best-selling game in the United Kingdom in the fourth week of the same month, and again briefly in July 2008. The game's Xbox 360 version received a "Platinum" sales award from the Entertainment and Leisure Software Publishers Association, indicating sales of at least 300,000 copies in the United Kingdom. During June 2008 in the United States, Lego Indiana Jones also sold 267,800 copies on the DS, 294,500 copies on the Wii, and 260,300 copies on the PlayStation 2.

=== Accolades ===
Award	Category	Result	Ref.
IGN Nintendo DS Awards	Best Action Game	Nominated	
IGN Nintendo DS Awards	Best Local Multiplayer Game	Nominated	
IGN Wii Awards	Best Action Game	Nominated	
IGN Wii Awards	Best Local Multiplayer Game	Nominated	
IGN Xbox Game of the Month	June 2008 Game of the Month	Nominated	
2008 Spike Video Game Awards	Best Game Based on a Movie or TV Show	Won	
2008 Develop Awards	Best Use of a Licence	Won	

== Legacy ==
Shortly after the game's release, Storc signalled the creation of a sequel due to the absence of The Kingdom of the Crystal Skull from the first game. A sequel titled Lego Indiana Jones 2: The Adventure Continues was announced in May 2009 by Traveller's Tales and LucasArts. In addition to the first three films, the game also includes and puts emphasis on the fourth film, The Kingdom of the Crystal Skull. It also features a level editor. It was released on 17 November in North America and two days later in Europe. The game received "mixed or average" reviews according to Metacritic. A separate handheld version was also released.

A mobile version of Lego Indiana Jones was announced by THQ Wireless in October 2008. The game, developed by Cobra Mobile with Java, featured platformer elements. Writing for Pocket Gamer, Spanner Spencer unfavourably described it as a Super Mario Bros. clone. It was released for mobile phones in 2008 and the iPhone in 2009.
