= MotoGP 2 =

2001 video game

- North American cover art
- Developer: Namco
- Publishers: JP: Namco; NA: Namco Hometek; EU: Sony Computer Entertainment
- Producer: Takashi Fukawa
- Programmer: Satoru Ouchi
- Platform: PlayStation 2
- Release: JP: 20 December 2001; NA: 22 January 2002; EU: 15 February 2002
- Genres: Racing, sports
- Modes: Single-player, multiplayer

MotoGP 2 is a 2001 racing video game developed and published by Namco for the PlayStation 2. It is an officially licensed MotoGP game and is the sequel to MotoGP (2000). It was followed by MotoGP 3 in 2003.

== Gameplay ==
MotoGP 2 features several courses from the 2001 Grand Prix, including Mugello, as seen above.

MotoGP 2 is based on the 2001 Grand Prix motorcycle racing season. New to the sequel is the legends mode where the player races against famous riders from the past. Other modes are arcade, season, time trial, challenge, and versus. All of the five tracks from the previous game are included, alongside five new ones: Barcelona-Catalunya, Assen, Le Mans, Mugello, and Sachsenring. A new addition is the ability to race in wet weather. One new tuning option has been added. The rider models have more polygons and they have improved animations compared to previous game in the series. MotoGP's graphical problems with aliasing and flickering have been improved.

== Reception ==
Reception

Aggregate scores
Aggregator	Score
GameRankings	78%
Metacritic	71/100

Review scores
Publication	Score
GamePro	4.0/5
GameSpot	8.0/10
GameSpy	84%
GameZone	8.0/10
IGN	7.8/10

MotoGP 2 received generally positive reviews from critics. GameSpot concluded that "[...] MotoGP 2 is a great addition for racing fans who missed the original MotoGP among the sea of more popular launch games such as SSX and Ridge Racer V, and those who do own the original will certainly appreciate all the new changes that this sequel incorporates." IGN said that "MotoGP2 is more like an add-on to the original, with slight tweaks in every category, but retaining the design, feel, and balance of the first." GameSpy summarized: "Challenging superbike races and plenty of variety make MotoGP an enjoyable contest with durable replay value." GameZone said that "[o]verall, the game is definitely a blast to play, but despite the five additional tracks it still gets boring too quickly." GamePro recommended the game "for serious motorcycle sim fans only".
