= Naruto Shippūden 3D: The New Era =

2011 video game

- Developer: Takara Tomy
- Publishers: JP: Takara Tomy; EU: 505 Games
- Series: Naruto: Ninja Council
- Platform: Nintendo 3DS
- Release: March 31, 2011: JP: March 31, 2011; EU: June 17, 2011; AU: July 7, 2011
- Genre: Action
- Mode: Single-player

Naruto Shippūden 3D: The New Era (known as Naruto Shippūden: Shinobi Rittai Emaki Saikyō Ninkai Kessen (ナルト- 疾風伝 忍立体絵巻!最強忍界決戦!) in Japan, and Naruto Shippuden: The New Era in Europe) is a video game developed by Tomy and published by 505 Games for Nintendo 3DS. This title is the eighth and final installment of the Ninja Council series of Naruto videogames. The game was never released in North America.

== Overview ==
The game starts with Naruto Uzumaki training on Mount Myōboku. Soon after his training, he is called back to Konoha by Kakashi Hatake. When he arrives, Naruto finds out that Tsunade has cancelled the pact with Sunagakure, and the hidden villages all seem to be about to go to war. The game features 2.5D graphics like its predecessors in the Ninja Council series.

== Reception ==
Reception

Aggregate scores
Aggregator	Score
GameRankings	51.17%
Metacritic	50/100

Review scores
Publication	Score
Nintendo Life	5/10
Official Nintendo Magazine	62%

The game was met with very mixed reception upon release, as GameRankings gave it a score of 51.17%, while Metacritic gave it 50 out of 100.
