= Naruto Mobile =

- Developer: More Fun Studio
- Publisher: Tencent Games
- Series: Naruto
- Platforms: Android, iOS
- Release: CHN: 2016
- Genres: Side-scrolling, Beat 'em up, fighting
- Modes: Single-player, multiplayer

Naruto Mobile (Chinese: 火影忍者手游; pinyin: Huǒyǐngrěnzhě Shǒuyóu; Naruto Mobairu (ナルトモバイル)) is a free-to-play side-scrolling action fighter mobile game developed by More Fun Studio (a subsidiary of Tencent Games) and published by Tencent Games, created with licensing and IP support from Bandai Namco Games. The game features a strong focus on player-versus-player (PvP) combat and animation effects. Production oversight is provided by Naruto creator Masashi Kishimoto along with the production committee consisting of Shueisha, TV Tokyo, and Studio Pierrot.

The game's art style depicts backgrounds and characters in 2D with character animations. Several older character designs, backgrounds, and non-playable opponent assets were adapted from Naruto Online, as both titles share the same development studios. Unlike Naruto Online, players do not create an original avatar, as the story directly follows the canonical characters from the original manga and anime series. The narrative begins with the first episode of the original Naruto anime and progresses through to the events of Boruto: Naruto Next Generations.

Naruto Mobile was released exclusively in Chinese, featuring original Japanese voice acting for all characters. Access to the game requires mandatory account registration via the Chinese social platforms QQ or WeChat.

== Gameplay ==
Naruto Mobile features beat 'em up style fighting mechanics set along a vertical axis, allowing characters to move up and down across the stage in addition to traditional left-and-right movement.

Progression in the game follows the storyline of the anime. Playable characters are categorized into a tier ranking system of S, A, B, and C based on their strength, rarity, and method of acquisition:

- S-Rank: The strongest and rarest fighters.
- C-Rank: Relatively weaker characters, primarily consisting of minor figures from the series.

Players unlock playable characters by collecting character fragments, winning tournaments, purchasing them with in-game currency or real money, or receiving them through monthly sign-in rewards and gifts. In addition to core combat, the gameplay includes minor narrative missions, such as carrying a dying Zabuza to Haku's body.

== Reception ==
Naruto Mobile has achieved significant commercial success for Tencent Games since its launch in 2016. By 2024, its lifetime cumulative revenue across all mobile platforms surpassed CN¥20 billion (approximately US$3.1 billion). It consistently ranks among the top-performing mobile games in China, placing 7th among all Tencent-published mobile titles in 2024 and 14th overall among all mobile games in China by annual revenue, generating roughly CN¥4.0 billion (approximately US$568 million) in 2024 alone.

In 2023, official data indicated that over 6 million players participated in the game's official e-sports events, drawing a cumulative audience of over 100 million viewers.

The game maintains an active user base, recording peak daily active users (DAU) exceeding 10 million and maintaining a 30-day retention rate above 21%. During the summer of 2024 (June–August), the game registered a 40% year-over-year growth in revenue.

Industry analysts attribute the game's sustained performance to its PvP mechanics, regular content updates, and social features such as Clan Wars and Ninja Leagues, backed by the strength of the underlying Naruto intellectual property.
