= Dragon Ball Z: Shin Budokai =

2006 video game

- European cover art
- Developer: Dimps
- Publishers: JP: Bandai Namco Games (Note: Released under the Bandai brand name.); NA/AU: Atari; EU: Bandai
- Director: Hirotoshi Shiozaki
- Producers: Ryo Mito; Takashi Tsukamoto; Yukata Fujimoto
- Programmer: Ryosuke Nakano
- Composers: Hiroshi Kamo; Kenji Yamamoto
- Series: Dragon Ball; Budokai
- Platform: PlayStation Portable
- Release: NA: March 7, 2006; JP: April 20, 2006; PAL: May 26, 2006
- Genre: Fighting
- Mode: Multiplayer

Dragon Ball Z: Shin Budokai (Note: Japanese: ドラゴンボールZ 真武道会, Hepburn: Doragon Bōru Zetto Shin Budôkai; Dragon Ball Z: True Tournament) is a fighting video game part of the Dragon Ball Z franchise, and was released on March 7, 2006, developed by Dimps. The story mode is based on the events of the Dragon Ball Z movie Fusion Reborn. The players follow the events of the story in which they encounter many Dragon Ball Z characters, including Goku and Vegeta. The choices that you make determine how the story evolves.

The Arcade Mode, is a single-player mode that allows the player to battle computer controlled (CPU) fighters, in order to gain Dragon Balls. A Z Trial mode allows the player to either survive an unending wave of enemies for as long as possible, or to defeat as many enemies possible within an assigned time slot. There are also customization options present, in the form of the "Profile Card". This allows the player to design their own card and customize it with items from the in-game item store.

== Versus mode ==
Dragon Ball Z: Shin Budokai was produced by Osaka-based Japanese video game production company Dimps, who notably produced several other Dragon Ball games, including Dragon Ball: Xenoverse and Dragon Ball: Xenoverse 2.

=== Dragon Road ===
Dragon Road is the title of the game's single-player campaign. The game takes inspiration from the plot of the Dragon Ball movie, entitled "Fusion Reborn". As the player progresses, they will find themselves participating in fights, either for friendly competition or against enemies. The campaign begins with a portal from hell, opening up on the earth, and the dead being resurrected. Goku and his allies must fight their way through, arenas such as the plains of earth, or the ruins of hell. The Dragon Road consists of a total of 5 chapters.

=== Training Mode ===
The training mode allows the players to battle CPU (computer-controlled enemies) to hone their skills.

Several options are afforded to the player which they may tweak as they see fit, these include:

- Health: The amount of health either player begins the fight with, there are 7 total bars of health for each competitor.
- Starting Ki: How much energy the player wishes to begin the battle with. There are 7 bars of Ki for each competitor.
- Check Energy: The amount of Ki needed to teleport behind an enemy to dodge their attack, the default consumption is 3/7 of the Ki bar.

=== Network Battle Mode ===
Network Battle Mode allows the player to have wireless battles with their friends. The player may also add friends to their profile card, which displays their victory ratio. Each battle won will raise the players' power level.

=== Arcade ===
The objective of the arcade mode is to collect all 7 dragon balls. The player is forced to fight 10 opponents in a row, in a ladder-like setting, such as the arcade mode present in Mortal Kombat. Occasionally, depending on the existing in-world relationships between each character, there may be short dialogue scenes.

=== Time Attack ===
In Time Attack, the player must fight 7 courses of enemies and defeat them as fast as possible.

=== Survival ===
Survival allows the player to fight nonstop hordes of enemies until they lose, after a certain number of wins, their health will stop regenerating all 7 bars.

=== Profile Card ===
Here, the player can create a special ID card that is used during Network Battles. It records the players data, battles won, battles lost, Survival Records, Time Attacks, Rankings in Dragon Road, Power Level, Friends, Money, and the players Victory Ratio. The player can also buy stamps from the shop to customize them to their liking.

== Playable characters ==
- Goku
- Vegeta
- Teen Gohan
- Gohan
- Pikkon
- Android 18
- Krillin
- Trunks
- Piccolo
- Frieza
- Cell
- Kid Buu
- Cooler
- Broly
- Gotenks
- Vegito
- Gogeta
- Janemba

== Release ==
Dragon Ball Z: Shin Budokai was published by Bandai in Japan, Namco Bandai Games Europe in Europe, and by Atari in North America and Australia. It was first released in North America on March 7, 2006, followed by Japan on April 20, 2006, and the United Kingdom and Australia on May 26, 2006.

== Reception ==
Reception

Aggregate score
Aggregator	Score
Metacritic	70/100

Review scores
Publication	Score
GameSpot	7.5/10
IGN	7.0/10

The game received "mixed or average" reviews according to review aggregator Metacritic.

IGN writer Chris Roper described the game's fighting system as "limited" and "basic" in nature.
