= MotoGP (2006 video game) =

2006 video game

- Cover art featuring Valentino Rossi
- Developer: Namco Bandai Games
- Publishers: WW: Namco Bandai Games (Note: Released under the Namco label outside North America.); EU: Sony Computer Entertainment
- Director: Fumihiro Tanaka
- Producer: Isao Nakamura
- Designer: Yuji Iizuka
- Programmers: Satoru Ouchi; Kensuke Nakahashi
- Artists: Masaru Tsujiyama; Minori Kubota; Hideomi Hashima; Tatsuo Shioda; Masamoto Katsuyama
- Composers: Tetsukazu Nakanishi; Kazuhiro Nakamura
- Platform: PlayStation Portable
- Release: JP: August 24, 2006; NA: September 26, 2006; AU: October 26, 2006; EU: October 27, 2006
- Genre: Racing
- Modes: Single-player, multiplayer

MotoGP is a 2006 racing video game developed and published by Namco Bandai Games for the PlayStation Portable. It is the last MotoGP game to be released under the license offered to Namco, Namco Bandai's predecessor. MotoGP was developed by Namco Bandai Games and was released in 2006. The game received average reviews with most critics focusing towards the graphics and gameplay.

== Gameplay ==
MotoGP is a racing game featuring motorcycles and riders seen in the 2005 MotoGP season, with 2006 content added in the European release. The game features the game modes Arcade (single race), Time Trial, One on One, Multiplayer, and Season (Career) mode.

== Reception ==
Reception

Aggregate score
Aggregator	Score
Metacritic	69/100

Review scores
Publication	Score
Eurogamer	6/10
Famitsu	31/40
GameSpot	7/10
GameSpy	3/5
IGN	7/10
PlayStation Official Magazine – UK	6/10
PALGN	6.5/10
Play	75%
PSM3	79%
VideoGamer.com	7/10

The game received "average" reviews according to the review aggregation website Metacritic. IGN said: "The season mode is as basic as it gets, and there isn't much besides that. The riding mechanics are fantastic, however, and that's what makes the game a nice pickup for motorcycle racing fans". In Japan, Famitsu gave it a score of two eights, one seven, and one eight, for a total of 31 out of 40.
