= Lego Indiana Jones 2: The Adventure Continues =

2009 action-adventure video game

- Developer: Traveller's Tales
- Publishers: LucasArts; Feral Interactive (OS X)
- Director: Jon Burton
- Producer: Steve Wakeman
- Designer: Jon Burton
- Programmer: John Hodskinson
- Artist: James Cunliffe
- Composer: David Whittaker
- Series: Lego Indiana Jones
- Platforms: Microsoft Windows; PlayStation 3; Wii; Xbox 360; Mac OS X
- Release: NA: 17 November 2009; EU: 20 November 2009; AU: 25 November 2009; Mac OS X: WW: 2 April 2011
- Genre: Action-adventure
- Modes: Single-player, multiplayer

Lego Indiana Jones 2: The Adventure Continues is a 2009 action-adventure video game developed by Traveller's Tales and published by LucasArts. Based on the Indiana Jones franchise, it is the sequel to the 2008 video game Lego Indiana Jones: The Original Adventures. It was released for the Wii, Xbox 360, PlayStation 3, and Microsoft Windows; Feral Interactive published a version for Mac OS X in 2011. TT Fusion developed a handheld version for the Nintendo DS and PlayStation Portable that, although released under the same name, is different in gameplay and amount of content.

The game allows players to play through the first four Indiana Jones films (albeit with different scenes chosen for adaptation than the original), including Indiana Jones and the Kingdom of the Crystal Skull, which was not included in the previous game. The gameplay of Lego Indiana Jones 2 differs in many areas from the original; it includes multiple open world hub worlds where levels are placed, changes character abilities, and implements an offline level creator and "adventure creator", both of which can be used to create new experiences using previously seen content.

Although the game was a commercial success, it received mixed reviews from critics, who commended the level design and level creator features, but panned it for its "confusing" hub worlds and lack of online play at launch, generally believing it to be inferior to its predecessor.

== Gameplay ==
Lego Indiana Jones 2: The Adventure Continues uses a third-person view and lets the player control a Lego figure in areas related to Indiana Jones movie scenes. Each movie in the franchise is contained in a "playset", with the exception of the Kingdom of the Crystal Skull, which is divided into three playsets. Each playset contains five story levels and a unique hub. These hubs are large maps based on locations from the films that function as directories to levels, contain puzzles, purchasable characters, and are traversable by purchasable vehicles. This differs from the original, which had a single hub (Barnett College) where levels could be accessed immediately. Playsets have four types of story levels: one with a boss battle against the movie's main antagonist, vehicular levels (in which the player needs to destroy vehicles using the player's own vehicle), levels where many waves of enemies need to be defeated, and general puzzle levels. Along with the main story levels in each playset, there are additional levels to be found in the hub world. The player can play the additional levels using vehicles and characters also found in the hub world. Vehicles available for purchase include: boats, planes, animals, and automobiles. The character roster contains more than 80 characters. To purchase these, the player can destroy Lego props or complete puzzles at hubs for a currency called Studs.

An example of split-screen multiplayer gameplay

Lego Indiana Jones 2 features special abilities for characters to solve puzzles and defeat enemies. For example, Indiana Jones can use his whip to attack or tie up enemies, manipulate objects, or swing from the ceiling. There are also high-jumping characters, wrench-using characters, shovel-carrying characters, and gun-wielding characters.

Two-player co-op was changed from the original with split-screen; rather than forcing both characters to always be close enough to fit on the same screen, the game seamlessly splits when characters wander apart from one another and merge into one screen when both players are near each other. On 23 November 2009, LucasArts revealed that it was working on a patch for the PlayStation 3 and Xbox 360 versions of the game which enabled online co-op gameplay, including for custom levels.

According to Kellam Eanes, Project Lead of LucasArts, Lego Indiana Jones 2 includes a level builder, the first Lego game to do so, where players can build their own levels using assets unlocked through progression in-game followed by purchase. These items include blocks, traps, animals, vehicles, and programmable characters. In this process, objects and bricks are manually put down. This system can also be used in split-screen co-op. Similarly, there is an "adventure creator", where players can change certain things about a pre-existing level to quickly create a custom level. A character creator is also included, although Lego Indiana Jones 2 is not the first Lego game to include the feature.

== Synopsis ==
Lego Indiana Jones 2 is a humorous retelling of the first four Indiana Jones films: Raiders of the Lost Ark, Temple of Doom, The Last Crusade, and Kingdom of the Crystal Skull. The game's retellings differ in several ways from the original films; for instance, they feature boss battles which are either not present or dissimilar to what is present in the films. Entrance to the story levels also prompts cutscenes, which explain prior events and lend context to the scene unfolding.

Because the original game already adapted the first three films, they are not as prominently featured in the sequel, and their stories were heavily modified to include new scenes and omit others. As a result, the length to complete the campaigns for the first three films is much shorter than in the previous game. The fourth film, however, is divided into three playsets, adding up to a completion length closer to the film's runtime.

== Marketing and release ==
Lego Indiana Jones 2: The Adventure Continues was developed by Traveller's Tales and TT Fusion. The game's development happened primarily in August and September 2009, and 35,000 man-hours were spent play testing the game. Its existence was leaked by accident in March when it was discovered that an animator's publicly visible résumé stated that she had worked "as a Cutscene Animator on LEGO Harry Potter & LEGO Indiana Jones 2: The Kingdom of the Crystal Skull which are both in the early stages of production." The portfolio also alluded to Lego The Hobbit. Although removed shortly after discovery, the leak was not acknowledged by Traveller's Tales, who only announced the game on 29 May, when it was said by LucasArts that the game would offer "a tongue-in-cheek take on all four cinematic adventures of pop culture's most iconic archaeologist." The announcement also made reference to the feature of building custom levels. Game footage was shown off at E3, then the game demoed at Legoland Windsor for the LEGO Indiana Jones Fireworks Extravaganza in October 2009. It was then released to North American markets on 17 November 2009, European markets on 20 November, and Australian markets on 25 November. Feral Interactive distributed the game for Mac worldwide on 2 April 2011.

== Reception ==
Reception

Aggregate score
Aggregator	Score
Metacritic	(PC) 66/100 (PS3) 70/100 (X360) 71/100 (Wii) 72/100

Review scores
Publication	Score
Eurogamer	7/10
Game Informer	6.5/10
GameRevolution	7/10
GameSpot	8/10
GamesRadar+	3.5/5
GameTrailers	7/10
GameZone	9/10
IGN	6/10
The Guardian	5/5
VideoGamer.com	7/10

The game's announcement was subject of skepticism regarding similarity to the original. It was believed that adding another film, the critically disliked Kingdom of the Crystal Skull, would not justify making another game after such a short break, as the previous game released only the previous year.

On release, Lego Indiana Jones 2 generally received mixed reviews. Chris Roper of IGN praised the game's lasting appeal and soundtrack, but he also lamented the lack of secrets in the main levels as well as the disorganized hub worlds. Brian Crescente of Kotaku, however, said the game delivered on many levels and recommended it over the first game. Reviewers commended it for not staying onto the details of the movies and instead focusing on humor, a feature that was present in its predecessor. Tom McShea of GameSpot suggested that the "roll-your-eyes nature of the film found a much better fit in the Lego game adaptation." Some reviewers observed that the final bosses were especially unlike the contents of the films, but that Kingdom of the Crystal Skull's adaptation was more faithful. The share that Kingdom of the Crystal Skull received of the game's runtime was a source of irritation among reviewers. The game's level design was lambasted by critics, who took umbrage with the clarity of hazards, implementation of combat, and finding and proceeding with a level's objective.

Matt Miller of Game Informer proclaimed that the graphics are the best out of any preceding Lego game due to their colors and increased focus on animations.

The inclusion of a level creator was praised by critics, but they took issue with the lack of online sharing. Dan Whitehead of Eurogamer described the tool as "powerful" and that the menus, although a bit "fiddly", were easy to use. However, Miller and The Guardian's Neil Davey commented that the creation of a level is a tedious process on the basis that the user is required to place down elements piece by piece. Lego Indiana Jones 2's inclusion of a level editor despite not having the functionality to share the levels was also a source of criticism. Regarding this perceived redundancy, Roper said "most everyone who buys LEGO Indy 2 will never play content created by another user, despite it including a built-in level creator, and that's a major problem."
