= Naruto Shippuden: Legends – Akatsuki Rising =

2009 video game

Naruto Shippuden: Legends: Akatsuki Rising
- North American box art
- Developer: Racjin
- Publisher: Namco Bandai Games (Note: Released under the Bandai brand name outside North America)
- Composer: Chikayo Fukuda
- Series: Naruto: Uzumaki Chronicles
- Platform: PlayStation Portable
- Release: EU: September 24, 2009; AU: October 2, 2009; NA: October 6, 2009
- Genre: Adventure
- Modes: Single-player, multiplayer

Naruto Shippuden: Legends: Akatsuki Rising is a video game developed by Cavia and published by Namco Bandai games. It is the third adventure game in the Naruto: Uzumaki Chronicles series for the PlayStation Portable (PSP). The previous release on PlayStation 2 was replaced by a handle-console on PlayStation Portable, created by Cavia in this series after it was replaced by Legends: Akatsuki Rising's former name Uzumaki Chronicles. The game was released on September 24, 2009 in Europe, October 2, 2009 in Australia and October 6, 2009 in North America.

== Reception ==
The game received mixed reviews. Ryan Clements of IGN was disappointed, stating that Naruto Shippuden: Legends: Akatsuki Rising follows the same story as Naruto Shippuden: Ultimate Ninja 4 and is no fun. He further commented that the game's battle system can be frustrating, and he described it as "a mediocre game at best". Clements offered the game a score of 5.0 out of 10. Despite praising the game's music and the English voice-over artists' work, Allen Rausch of GameSpot also characterized Naruto Shippuden: Legends: Akatsuki Rising as "mediocre" and offered it a score of 5.5 out of 10. Aaron Birch of Den of Geek liked the presentation and the ample game modes, but he still viewed the game as "dull", with "small, often empty levels", and commented that he had begun to tire quickly when playing the game. Birch offered the game 2 stars out of 5. On Metacritic, Naruto Shippuden: Legends: Akatsuki Rising received a score of 60 out of 100 based on 15 critic reviews and a user score of 6.0 out of 10 based on 11 ratings. Rory Smith of GamesRadar+ said that while fans might enjoy the multiplayer mode, the dialogues are too long and the missions are reduced to "wandering through unremarkable environments". Smith offered the game 3 stars out of 5.
