= Naruto: Ultimate Ninja Heroes =

2007 video game

- Developers: CyberConnect2; MiCROViSion
- Publisher: Namco Bandai Games
- Series: Naruto: Ultimate Ninja
- Platform: PlayStation Portable
- Release: NA: August 28, 2007; EU: September 14, 2007; AU: November 1, 2007
- Genre: Fighting game
- Modes: Single-player, multiplayer

Naruto: Ultimate Ninja Heroes is a North America and PAL region-exclusive fighting game developed by CyberConnect2 and MiCROViSion and published by Namco Bandai Games for PlayStation Portable in 2007. It is the first installment of the Heroes series in the west; it is also essentially an edited version of Naruto: Ultimate Ninja Heroes 2: The Phantom Fortress, serving as a prequel to the next game, as the Japanese dub is not included in this game, essentially turning the game into a scaled down version of Naruto: Ultimate Ninja 2.

== Gameplay ==
Story Mode, Kabuto, Shizune, The Third Hokage, and two stages were removed in this release, while Naruto & Sasuke's secret techniques were modified to prevent spoilers (as the English dub had not reached the Sasuke Retrieval arc yet). To compensate for these removals, the game now has a 3-on-3 battle system, similar to The King of Fighters; where the first team to defeat all three members of the other team wins. The game features 20 characters, eight Stages, and several new features, such as a three-on-three fighting system, wireless two-player battles, and "Hidden Team Skills", which grant special abilities to a certain combination of characters.

== Reception ==
Reception

Aggregate score
Aggregator	Score
Metacritic	70/100

Review scores
Publication	Score
Destructoid	8/10
Game Informer	6.75/10
Gamekult	6/10
GameSpot	6.5/10
GameSpy	2.5/5 stars
GameZone	8/10
IGN	7.7/10
Jeuxvideo.com	14/20
Joystiq	7.5/10
PlayStation: The Official Magazine	8/10

The game received "mixed or average reviews" according to the review aggregation website Metacritic.
