= Lego Indiana Jones 2: The Adventure Continues (handheld video game) =

2009 video game

- Developer: TT Fusion
- Publisher: LucasArts
- Series: Lego Indiana Jones
- Platforms: Nintendo DS; PlayStation Portable
- Release: NA: 17 November 2009; EU: 20 November 2009; AU: 25 November 2009
- Genre: Action-adventure
- Modes: Single-player, multiplayer

Lego Indiana Jones 2: The Adventure Continues is an action-adventure video game developed by TT Fusion and published by LucasArts. Part of the Lego Indiana Jones series, it was released for the Nintendo DS and PlayStation Portable on 17 November 2009 in North America, 20 November 2009 in Europe, and 25 November 2009 in Australia. While having the same name as the PC and console game Lego Indiana Jones 2: The Adventure Continues, it is effectively a different game with regards to gameplay and content.

The game received mixed reviews from critics, who cited its lack of interesting levels or exploration in general, also criticising the fact that its DS version was not designed specifically for that system to make use of its unique features, though the graphics were called impressive for the DS.

== Gameplay ==
Gameplay screenshot

Lego Indiana Jones 2: The Adventure Continues is an action-adventure game played from the third-person perspective, in which the player controls a Lego figurine. Unlike the console version, the game's handheld release covers only the Kingdom of the Crystal Skull, dividing it into three chapters. The release plays akin to a sidescroller, in that the levels primarily move left and right, rather than forward. The version does this while also employing the same design elements in the main release like puzzles, dispersed enemies, and vehicles. It also adapts wholly different scenes for levels. Since it only adapts one film, the version has a single hub, which is set on an island. The release also makes use of local online co-op, where the game is run on multiple nearby devices, instead of running on one device played by multiple people.

== Reception ==
Reception

Aggregate score
Aggregator	Score
Metacritic	(DS) 59/100

Review scores
Publication	Score
GamesRadar+	3/5
IGN	5.2/10
NGamer	63/100
Nintendo Power	5/10

Lego Indiana Jones 2: The Adventure Continues for DS received "mixed or average" reviews, according to review aggregator Metacritic.

Chris Roper of IGN rated the game 5.2/10 points, saying that the series had "lost its charm" by going portable. Saying that the handheld version offered a "completely different, and unfortunately worse" experience than on other platforms, he described it as "simply boring", with "wonky" controls and uninteresting level design. Calling it a "very linear experience", he commented on the game's lack of exploration, while criticising the choice to only include Kingdom of the Crystal Skull. He noted a lack of Nintendo DS-specific controls on that version due to the game's dual-portable development.

Nathan Meunier of GamesRadar+ took issue with the game's controls, especially for its vehicle segments, but praised the graphics. Carolyn G. of Nintendo Power rated the DS version 5/10 points, praising some of the levels as having an impressive sense of scale, but remarking that the puzzles were too easy, and the touch-screen controls overly "finicky". She summed up the story's humour as falling flat most of the time. Nintendo Gamer rated the same version 63/100 points, calling it a "lovely bit of fanservice".
