= MotoGP (2000 video game) =

2000 video game

- North American box art
- Developer: Namco
- Publishers: JP: Namco; NA: Namco Hometek; EU: Sony Computer Entertainment
- Composer: Yoshie Takayanagi
- Platform: PlayStation 2
- Release: JP: October 12, 2000; NA: October 26, 2000; EU: February 16, 2001
- Genre: Racing
- Modes: Single-player, multiplayer

MotoGP is a 2000 racing video game developed and published by Namco for the PlayStation 2. The game is based on Namco's 1998 arcade game 500GP (which was based on the 1998 season) and the company's second MotoGP game. In North America, it was released as a launch title for the PlayStation 2.

MotoGP is based on the 1999 season, although only four of the tracks from that season (and Suzuka Circuit, which was removed from that season's calendar) are featured. Later games in the series went on to fill out the gaps and became more of a true representation of the seasons they covered. The first installment is also notable for the inclusion of Klonoa, the titular character of another Namco series, who appears as a playable guest character, as well as Gun Koma, a character from Bari Bari Densetsu manga. The game was followed by MotoGP 2 in 2001.

== Reception ==
Reception

Aggregate score
Aggregator	Score
Metacritic	77/100

Review scores
Publication	Score
CNET Gamecenter	7/10
Edge	5/10
Electronic Gaming Monthly	8.33/10 (Note: In Electronic Gaming Monthly's review of the game, one critic gave it 9/10, and the rest gave it each a score of 8/10.)
EP Daily	7/10
Famitsu	9/10, 8/10, 8/10, 10/10
Game Informer	7.5/10
GameFan	80%
GameRevolution	B
GameSpot	8/10
IGN	7.3/10
Next Generation	4/5
Official U.S. PlayStation Magazine	4/5

The game received "generally favorable reviews" according to the review aggregation website Metacritic.

David Chen of NextGen said: "It's fast and in-depth enough to satisfy the armchair 500cc-class racer, but it certainly doesn't fit the bill of 'fun for the whole gang.'" Lamchop of GamePro called it "a strong bike sim with great graphics and fast gameplay, and is well worth a weekend rental at the very least." (Note: GamePro gave the game two 4.5/5 scores for graphics and sound, 3/5 for control, and 4/5 for fun factor.)
