= Naruto: Ninja Council =

Video game series

Cover art for Naruto: Ninja Council.

The Naruto: Ninja Council series, known in Japan as Naruto: Saikyō Ninja Daikesshū (NARUTO(ナルト) 最強忍者大結集), is a series of action games based on the manga and anime series Naruto by Masashi Kishimoto. They are developed by Aspect Co. and published by Tomy (with D3 Publisher distributing the first four games in North America, and Atlus distributing Naruto vs. Sasuke and Shinobi Rumble in said region). Various installments of the series have appeared on both Nintendo's Game Boy Advance and Nintendo DS, the first two games in the series available for the former while the rest are available on the latter.

== Game Boy Advance ==
=== Naruto: Ninja Council ===
Naruto: Ninja Council (known as Naruto: Ninjutsu Zenkai! Saikyō Ninja Daikesshū (NARUTO(ナルト) 忍術全開! 最強忍者大結集, "Naruto: Full Throttle Ninjutsu! Great Council of the Strongest Ninja") in Japan) is the first installment in the Ninja Council series. It is an action game for the Game Boy Advance. There are scrolls that the character can obtain to perform abilities at the cost of Chakra, which can be used to attack, break down barriers, or create whirlwinds. The story mode very loosely follows the Land of Waves arc to the Chunin Exam arc.

=== Naruto: Ninja Council 2 ===
Naruto: Ninja Council 2 (known as Naruto: Saikyō Ninja Daikesshu 2 (NARUTO(ナルト) 最強忍者大結集2, "Naruto: Great Council of the Strongest Ninja 2") in Japan) is the second installment in the Ninja Council series for the Game Boy Advance. This game was released on April 29, 2004, with a North America release on October 10, 2006.

This game loosely follows the second through third seasons of the anime, but with some minor differences, such as repeated fights against Dosu Kinuta, Zaku Abumi, Kabuto Yakushi, and Orochimaru, as well as areas that did not appear in the anime. It also features a two-player co-op mode using the link cable, and a four-player battle mode. However, while the first game had voice samples from the cast (carried over from Clash of Ninja), this game does not. The sprites in this game, while not only different from Ninja Council, would become mainstays for this series.

== Nintendo DS ==
=== Naruto: Ninja Council 2 - European Version ===
Naruto: Ninja Council 2 - European Version is the third installment in the Ninja Council series and the first for the Nintendo DS. It was released in Japan on April 21, 2005, as Naruto: Saikyō Ninja Daikesshu 3 for DS (NARUTO(ナルト) 最強忍者大結集3 for DS, "Naruto: Great Council of the Strongest Ninja 3 for DS") and three years later in Europe on October 3, 2008, as Naruto: Ninja Council 2 - European Version. The game is not released in North America.

The game features side-scrolling action gameplay with touch-screen and microphone functionality. There are separate stages in the game much like the first two games in the series. The storyline follows the Sasuke Retrieval story arc, minus the Naruto Uzumaki and Sasuke Uchiha final battle on the Valley of the End. The Sound 4 are also present in the game, but Kimimaro is only featured in a mid-mission minigame, instead adding a final battle with Orochimaru, after defeated Orochimaru, Kabuto appears and escaping together with Orochimaru and then Sasuke will soon betraying on Naruto in the end of the game.

=== Naruto: Ninja Council 3 ===
Naruto: Ninja Council 3 is the fourth installment in the Ninja Council series for the Nintendo DS. It was released in Japan as Naruto: Saikyō Ninja Daikesshu 4 DS (NARUTO(ナルト) 最強忍者大結集4 DS, "Naruto: Great Council of the Strongest Ninja 4 DS"). Character-related content such as Kimimaro, the Sound 4's special attacks and their alternate forms themselves are changed or removed in the international versions. The game includes a Naruto CCG card as an added bonus. It features a "Movie" mode, which allows players to watch secret techniques. In Europe it was released by Nintendo as Naruto: Ninja Council - European Edition

Naruto: Ninja Council 3 has similar gameplay to the last two games in the series. The missions take place on a small map. The touch screen serves as both a map and as a place to perform different jutsu. Animals and ninjas are the typical opponents in the game. On certain missions, the player has to fight bosses, which are usually the antagonists from the series, including Ino. During missions, the player has to defeat the opponent under various conditions (e.g. having the character's health cut in half, protecting an ally, using a certain move to K.O. the opponent, etc.).

=== Naruto Shippuden: Ninja Council 4 ===
Naruto Shippuden: Ninja Council 4 (known as Naruto Shippūden: Saikyō Ninja Daikesshū Kessen! "Akatsuki" (NARUTO(ナルト) 疾風伝 最強忍者大結集5 決戦!"暁", lit. 'Naruto Shippūden: Great Council of the Strongest Ninja 5 - Decisive Battle! "Akatsuki"') in Japan) is the fifth installment in the Ninja Council series.

The game was released on June 2, 2009, in North America. In Europe, it was released by Nintendo as Naruto: Ninja Council 3 - European Edition.

=== Naruto Shippuden: Naruto vs. Sasuke ===
Naruto Shippūden: Saikyō Ninja Daikesshu Gekitotsu!! Naruto vs. Sasuke (NARUTO(ナルト) 疾風伝 最強忍者大結集 激突！！ナルトVSサスケ, "Naruto Shippūden: Great Council of the Strongest Ninja Clash!! Naruto vs. Sasuke") is the sixth installment of the Ninja Council series. It incorporates several tag-team specials. It was released in Japan on July 4, 2008, and in North America on November 16, 2010.

The character's sprites are smaller, allowing for more action on-screen. Most of the special moves no longer use touch screen in order to be performed. Touch screen controls perform certain jutsu. New characters include TS Sasuke and Sai. Online gameplay has been removed, although there is a high score mode available. There are also side-missions which can be completed to unlock more characters. It was released in North America under the title of Naruto Shippuden: Naruto vs. Sasuke.

=== Naruto Shippuden: Shinobi Rumble ===
Naruto Shippūden: Ninjutsu Zenkai! Chakrash!! (NARUTO(ナルト) 疾風伝 忍術全開!チャクラッシュ!!, lit. 'Naruto Shippūden: Full Throttle Ninjutsu! Chakrash!!') is the seventh installment of the Ninja Council series, and the first title in the series since the original to utilize the "Ninjutsu Zenkai!" subtitle in place of "Saikyō Ninja Daikesshu" in Japan. The title, "Chakrash", is a combination of "chakra" and "clash". It was released in Japan on April 22, 2010, and in America on February 8, 2011, under the title of Naruto Shippuden: Shinobi Rumble. It was not released in Europe.

== Nintendo 3DS ==
=== Naruto Shippuden 3D: The New Era ===
Naruto Shippūden 3D: The New Era (known as Naruto Shippūden: Shinobi Rittai Emaki Saikyō Ninkai Kessen (NARUTO(ナルト) 疾風伝 忍立体絵巻!最強忍界決戦!) in Japan) is the eighth and final installment of the Ninja Council series, and It is a side-scrolling adventure game and the first with 3D image projections for the Nintendo 3DS platform. The game starts off with Naruto Uzumaki training on Mount Myōboku. Soon after his training, he is called back to Konoha by Kakashi Hatake, and when he arrives Naruto finds out that Tsunade has cancelled the pact with Sunagakure and the hidden villages all seem to be about to go to war. And this is the last game to be featured in the Ninja Council series. It is a side-scrolling adventure game. This game features 2.5D graphics.

== See also ==
- List of Naruto video games
- List of Game Boy Advance games
- List of Nintendo DS games
