= Naruto: Ultimate Ninja Heroes 2 - The Phantom Fortress =

2006 video game

- Developers: CyberConnect2; Artdink
- Publisher: Namco Bandai Games
- Composer: Chikayo Fukuda
- Series: Naruto: Ultimate Ninja
- Platform: PlayStation Portable
- Release: JP: March 30, 2006; NA: June 24, 2008; EU: July 11, 2008; AU: July 31, 2008
- Genre: Fighting game
- Modes: Single-player, multiplayer

Naruto: Ultimate Ninja Heroes 2 - The Phantom Fortress, known as in Japan as Naruto: Narutimate Portable - Mugenjō no Maki (NARUTO(ナルト) ナルティメットポータブル 無幻城の巻, Naruto: Narutimetto Pōtaburu - Mugenjō no Maki; lit. "Naruto: Narutimate Portable - Castle of Illusions"), is a fighting game developed by CyberConnect2 and Artdink and published by Namco Bandai Games for PlayStation Portable in 2006–2008. It is the second installment of the Heroes series in the west.

== Plot ==
In the game, the player chooses four characters and equips them with skills and items. This release is the full non-modified version of Naruto: Ultimate Ninja Heroes, and contains the three characters that were removed: The Third Hokage, Shizune and Kabuto. Both removed stages and the game's Story Mode are now present as well. Additionally, movesets have been updated. Players can also select whether the characters use Japanese or English voices. Naruto and Jiraiya can use Rasengan, Kakashi can use Lightning Blade and Sasuke can use Chidori without the use of a secret technique.

While some characters retain their old techniques, others, such as Neji, have theirs upgraded. The game contains two original storylines involving moving up a haunted castle in the sky to the 100th floor in "The Mugenjo" mode from Naruto's perspective (or 30 subfloors if playing the "Hidden Mugenjo" mode from Jiraiya's perspective). Each floor has several "blank" rooms where the users place randomly generated scrolls to determine the type of action that will take place in the room. The scrolls include Battle (a player vs. CPU fight) and five mini game scrolls: Tree Climbing (Naruto dashes up a tree and dodges broken branches), Shadow Possession (Simon-style button pressing), Amusement (slot machines), Riddle (answer Naruto trivia) and Clone (the shell game where the player tries to follow the real clone). Non-blank rooms include Treasure Rooms, Healing Rooms and Drama rooms (where the story progresses and cut scenes take place). Other game modes include vs. CPU and ad hoc wireless battle mode where players can fight against a friend using game sharing (only one UMD, but two PSPs).

== Reception ==
Reception

Aggregate score
Aggregator	Score
Metacritic	64/100

Review scores
Publication	Score
Famitsu	30/40
GameSpot	4.5/10
GameSpy	2/5
GamesRadar+	3.5/5
GameZone	7.5/10
Hardcore Gamer	3/5
IGN	7.1/10
Jeuxvideo.com	13/20
Pocket Gamer	4/5
PlayStation: The Official Magazine	3/5

The game received "mixed" reviews according to the review aggregation website Metacritic. In Japan, however, Famitsu gave it a score of one eight, one six, and two eights for a total of 30 out of 40.
