= Platinum Hits =

Line of select Xbox games

Platinum Hits is a branding used by Microsoft for discounted reprints of Xbox video games. The branding is used for reprints of popular, top-selling games for each console in the Xbox family, which are deliberately sold with a lower MSRP than the original production runs of a game, and feature special branding—colored in platinum since Xbox—on their box art, as well as silver-colored cases on Xbox 360, Xbox One, and Xbox Series X/S releases (instead of the traditional clear or green-colored casing). The requirement for being a Platinum Hits title was selling at least 400,000 copies and being on the market for at least nine months after release, and have dropped in price from their original MSRP to a lower price, generally that of $19.99, although multi-game packs may sell for $24.99.

A similar budget range in PAL markets is known as Xbox Classics for £19.99 and Best of Classics for £9.99. In Japan, they are known as Platinum Collection games and generally cost ¥2,800, with certain games such as Grand Theft Auto IV and Dynasty Warriors 6 at a higher price point of ¥3,800. Sales requirements may vary by region.

On September 8, 2006, Microsoft announced the Platinum Collection would be extended to the Xbox 360 platform. On September 20, 2006, at Microsoft's Pre-Tokyo Game Show conference, they announced Platinum Hits for the Xbox 360 in North America, priced at $29.99 and Classics in the UK for £24.99. A second wave of titles was released in early 2007, with additional games being added periodically.

Platinum Family Hits are special Platinum Hits that have been designated appropriate for all ages. All current Platinum Family Hits are rated "E" by the ESRB, except for four E10+ rated games – Sonic the Hedgehog, Sonic Unleashed, Lego Star Wars II: The Original Trilogy and Banjo-Kazooie: Nuts & Bolts. Not all Platinum Hits offerings that receive an E rating are labeled with the Family Hits designation, however. As with Platinum Hits, the new suggested retail (MSRP) is $19.99.

Best of Platinum Hits are select best-selling Platinum Hits that have a suggested retail price of $9.99 and a slightly different "Best of Platinum Hits" logo on the package design. Best of Platinum Family Hits are chosen from the Platinum Family Hits line.

== Original Xbox ==
=== Games in Platinum Hits series ===
- 50 Cent: Bulletproof
- Amped: Freestyle Snowboarding
- Atari Anthology
- ATV: Quad Power Racing 2
- Baldur's Gate: Dark Alliance
- Black
- Blinx: The Time Sweeper
- Blitz: The League
- Blood Wake
- Burnout 3: Takedown
- Burnout Revenge
- Brute Force
- Cabela's Dangerous Hunts
- Call of Duty: Finest Hour
- Call of Duty 2: Big Red One
- Call of Duty 3
- Conflict: Desert Storm
- Counter-Strike
- Crimson Skies: High Road to Revenge
- Dave Mirra Freestyle BMX 2
- Dead or Alive 3
- Dead to Rights
- Def Jam: Fight for NY
- Destroy All Humans!
- Doom 3
- Enter the Matrix
- Fable: The Lost Chapters
- Fight Night 2004
- Fight Night Round 2
- Forza Motorsport
- Fuzion Frenzy
- Full Spectrum Warrior
- GoldenEye: Rogue Agent
- Grand Theft Auto: San Andreas
- Grand Theft Auto: Double Pack
- Greg Hastings' Tournament Paintball
- Halo: Combat Evolved
- Halo 2
- Hitman 2: Silent Assassin
- James Bond 007: Agent Under Fire
- James Bond 007: Everything or Nothing
- James Bond 007: Nightfire
- Juiced
- Marvel: Ultimate Alliance
- Max Payne
- MechAssault
- MechAssault 2: Lone Wolf
- Medal of Honor: Frontline
- Medal of Honor: Rising Sun
- Mercenaries: Playground of Destruction
- Midnight Club II
- Midnight Club 3: DUB Edition Remix
- Mortal Kombat: Deadly Alliance
- Mortal Kombat: Deception
- MVP Baseball 2005
- MX vs. ATV Unleashed
- Namco Museum
- NBA Ballers
- NBA Street Vol. 2
- Need for Speed: Hot Pursuit 2
- Need for Speed: Most Wanted
- Need for Speed: Underground
- Need for Speed: Underground 2
- NFL Street
- Oddworld: Munch's Oddysee
- Pac-Man World 2
- Prince of Persia: The Sands of Time
- Prince of Persia: Warrior Within
- Project Gotham Racing
- Project Gotham Racing 2
- RalliSport Challenge
- Red Dead Revolver
- Return to Castle Wolfenstein: Tides of War
- Silent Hill 2: Restless Dreams
- Soulcalibur II
- Spider-Man
- Spider-Man 2
- Spy Hunter
- SSX Tricky
- Star Wars: Battlefront
- Star Wars: Battlefront II
- Star Wars: Episode III: Revenge of the Sith
- Star Wars: Knights of the Old Republic
- Star Wars: Knights of the Old Republic II: The Sith Lords
- Star Wars: Obi-Wan
- Star Wars: Republic Commando
- Star Wars: Starfighter Special Edition
- Test Drive
- The Chronicles of Riddick: Escape from Butcher Bay
- The Elder Scrolls III: Morrowind
- The Elder Scrolls III: Morrowind - GOTY Edition
- The Godfather: The Game
- The Incredibles
- The Lord of the Rings: The Fellowship of the Ring
- The Lord of the Rings: Return of the King
- The Lord of the Rings: The Two Towers
- The Simpsons: Hit & Run
- The Simpsons: Road Rage
- Tom Clancy's Classic Trilogy
- Tom Clancy's Ghost Recon
- Tom Clancy's Ghost Recon 2
- Tom Clancy's Ghost Recon: Island Thunder
- Tom Clancy's Rainbow Six 3: Raven Shield
- Tom Clancy's Splinter Cell
- Tom Clancy's Splinter Cell: Pandora Tomorrow
- Tom Clancy's Splinter Cell: Chaos Theory
- Tony Hawk's American Wasteland
- Tony Hawk's Pro Skater 3
- Tony Hawk's Pro Skater 4
- Tony Hawk's Project 8
- Tony Hawk's Underground
- Tony Hawk's Underground 2
- True Crime: Streets of LA
- Unreal Championship
- Wreckless: The Yakuza Missions
- WWE RAW
- WWE Raw 2
- WWE WrestleMania 21
- X-Men Legends

=== Games in Best of Platinum Hits series ===
- Call of Duty: Finest Hour
- Counter-Strike
- Fable: The Lost Chapters
- Fuzion Frenzy
- Halo: Combat Evolved
- MechAssault
- Project Gotham Racing 2
- Soulcalibur II
- Spider-Man
- Spider-Man 2
- The Elder Scrolls III: Morrowind
- Tom Clancy's Ghost Recon
- Tom Clancy's Ghost Recon: Island Thunder
- Tom Clancy's Rainbow Six 3: Raven Shield
- Tom Clancy's Splinter Cell
- Tom Clancy's Splinter Cell: Pandora Tomorrow
- Tony Hawk's Pro Skater 4
- Tony Hawk's Underground
- Tony Hawk's Underground 2
- True Crime: Streets of LA

=== Games in Platinum Family Hits series ===
- Crash Bandicoot: The Wrath of Cortex
- Crash Bandicoot: The Wrath of Cortex/Crash Nitro Kart Bundle
- Crash Nitro Kart
- Dance Dance Revolution ULTRAMIX
- Disney/Pixar's Finding Nemo
- Dreamworks Shark Tale
- Harry Potter and the Chamber of Secrets
- Harry Potter: Quidditch World Cup
- Harry Potter and the Prisoner of Azkaban
- Lego Star Wars: The Video Game
- Lego Star Wars II: The Original Trilogy
- Shrek 2
- Shrek 2/Dreamworks Shark Tale Bundle
- Sonic Heroes
- Sonic Heroes/Super Monkey Ball Deluxe Bundle
- Sonic Mega Collection Plus
- Sonic Mega Collection Plus/Super Monkey Ball Deluxe Bundle
- SpongeBob SquarePants: Battle for Bikini Bottom
- SpongeBob SquarePants: Lights, Camera, Pants!
- Teenage Mutant Ninja Turtles
- Thrillville
- The SpongeBob SquarePants Movie
- Yu-Gi-Oh! The Dawn of Destiny

=== Games in Best of Platinum Family Hits series ===
- Madagascar
- Shrek 2

=== Games in Classics series (132) ===
- 50 Cent: Bulletproof
- Amped: Freestyle Snowboarding
- Blinx: The Time Sweeper
- Buffy: The Vampire Slayer
- Burnout
- Burnout 3: Takedown
- Burnout Revenge
- Call of Duty: Finest Hour
- Call of Duty 2: Big Red One
- Cars
- Colin McRae Rally 3
- Colin McRae Rally 04
- Colin McRae Rally 2005
- Conflict: Desert Storm
- Conflict: Desert Storm II
- Conflict: Vietnam
- Conker: Live & Reloaded
- Counter-Strike
- Crash Bandicoot: The Wrath of Cortex
- Crash Nitro Kart
- Crash Tag Team Racing
- Crash Twinsanity
- Dead or Alive 3
- Dead or Alive Xtreme Beach Volleyball
- Doom 3
- Driver 3
- DTM Race Driver 2
- Enter the Matrix
- Fable: The Lost Chapters
- FIFA Football 2003
- FIFA Football 2004
- FIFA Football 2005
- FIFA 06
- FIFA Street
- FIFA Street 2
- Finding Nemo
- Forza Motorsport
- Full Spectrum Warrior
- GoldenEye: Rogue Agent
- Grand Theft Auto: San Andreas
- Gun
- Halo: Combat Evolved
- Halo 2
- Harry Potter and the Chamber of Secrets
- Harry Potter and the Prisoner of Azkaban
- Harry Potter and the Goblet of Fire
- Harry Potter: Quidditch World Cup
- Hitman 2: Silent Assassin
- Hulk
- Ice Age 2: The Meltdown
- Jade Empire
- James Bond 007: Agent Under Fire
- James Bond 007: Everything or Nothing
- James Bond 007: Nightfire
- Juiced
- Lego Star Wars: The Video Game
- Madagascar
- Max Payne
- Medal of Honor: European Assault
- Medal of Honor: Frontline
- Medal of Honor: Rising Sun
- Men of Valor
- Metal Gear Solid 2: Substance
- Midtown Madness 3
- Mortal Kombat: Deadly Alliance
- MotoGP: Ultimate Racing Technology
- MotoGP: Ultimate Racing Technology 2
- Need for Speed: Most Wanted
- Need for Speed: Underground
- Need for Speed: Underground 2
- Ninja Gaiden
- Ninja Gaiden Black
- Oddworld: Munch's Oddysee
- Pirates of the Caribbean
- Prince of Persia: The Sands of Time
- Prince of Persia: The Two Thrones
- Prince of Persia: Warrior Within
- Pro Evolution Soccer 4
- Project Gotham Racing
- Project Gotham Racing 2
- RalliSport Challenge
- RalliSport Challenge 2
- Rayman 3: Hoodlum Havoc
- Return to Castle Wolfenstein: Tides of War
- Ricky Ponting International Cricket 2005
- Rugby League (NRL)
- Shrek 2
- Sonic Heroes
- Sonic Mega Collection Plus
- Spider-Man
- Spider-Man 2
- Spyro: A Hero's Tail
- SSX 3
- SSX Tricky
- Star Wars: Battlefront
- Star Wars: Battlefront II
- Star Wars: Episode III – Revenge of the Sith
- Star Wars: Knights of the Old Republic
- The Chronicles of Riddick: Escape from Butcher Bay
- The Elder Scrolls III: Morrowind
- The Incredibles
- The Lord of the Rings: The Fellowship of the Ring
- The Lord of the Rings: The Return of the King
- The Lord of the Rings: The Third Age
- The Lord of the Rings: The Two Towers
- The Simpsons: Hit & Run
- The Sims Bustin' Out
- The Urbz: Sims in the City
- TimeSplitters 2
- TOCA Race Driver 2
- Tom Clancy's Ghost Recon
- Tom Clancy's Ghost Recon 2
- Tom Clancy's Ghost Recon: Island Thunder
- Tom Clancy's Rainbow Six 3: Raven Shield
- Tom Clancy's Rainbow Six 3: Black Arrow
- Tom Clancy's Splinter Cell
- Tony Hawk's American Wasteland
- Tony Hawk's Pro Skater 3
- Tony Hawk's Pro Skater 4
- Tony Hawk's Underground
- Tony Hawk's Underground 2
- Top Spin
- True Crime: New York City
- True Crime: Streets of LA
- Turok Evolution
- Unreal Championship
- V8 Supercars Australia 2
- V8 Supercars Australia 3
- Worms 3D
- Wreckless: The Yakuza Missions
- WWE WrestleMania 21
- XIII

=== Games in Best of Classics series (11) ===
- Counter-Strike
- Crash Bandicoot: The Wrath of Cortex
- Crash Nitro Kart
- Crash Twinsanity
- Driver 3
- Fable: The Lost Chapters
- Halo: Combat Evolved
- Halo 2
- Project Gotham Racing 2
- Sonic Heroes
- The Simpsons: Hit & Run

=== Games in Platinum Collection series ===
- Atari Anthology
- Buffy the Vampire Slayer: Chaos Bleeds
- Counter-Strike
- Crazy Taxi 3: High Roller
- Dead Man's Hand
- Dead or Alive 3
- Dead or Alive Ultimate
- Dead or Alive Xtreme Beach Volleyball
- Dino Crisis 3
- Dr. Seuss' The Cat in the Hat
- Halo: Combat Evolved
- Halo 2
- Halo: History Pack
- Hitman 2: Silent Assassin
- Hunter: The Reckoning – Redeemer
- Inside Pitch 2003
- Jockey's Road
- Kurenai no Umi
- Links 2004
- Magic: The Gathering - Battlegrounds
- Metal Arms: Glitch in the System
- Murakumo: Renegade Mech Pursuit
- Muzzle Flash
- Ninja Gaiden Black
- Otogi
- Otogi: Hyakki Toubatsu Emaki
- Outlaw Golf
- Outlaw Volleyball
- Panzer Dragoon Orta
- Project Gotham Racing 2
- Rapala Pro Fishing
- Return to Castle Wolfenstein: Tides of War
- Rocky Legends
- Shin Megami Tensei: Nine
- Shrek 2
- Soulcalibur II
- Star Wars Jedi Knight: Jedi Academy
- SWAT: Global Strike Team
- Tao Feng: Fist of the Lotus
- The Simpsons: Hit & Run
- Tony Hawk's Underground: Pro Skater 2003
- Unreal Championship
- Voodoo Vince
- Wakeboarding Unleashed Featuring Shaun Murray
- X-Men Legends

== Xbox 360 ==
=== Games in Xbox 360 Platinum Hits (NTSC) ===
- Ace Combat 6: Fires of Liberation
- Army of Two
- Army of Two: The 40th Day
- Assassin's Creed
- Assassin's Creed II
- Assassin's Creed III
- Assassin's Creed: Brotherhood
- Assassin's Creed Revelations
- Banjo-Kazooie: Nuts & Bolts
- Batman: Arkham Asylum: Game of the Year Edition
- Batman Arkham City Game of the Year Edition
- Battlefield 2: Modern Combat
- Battlefield: Bad Company
- Battlefield: Bad Company 2
- Battlefield 3
- BioShock
- BioShock 2
- BioShock Infinite
- Borderlands
- Borderlands 2
- Bully: Scholarship Edition
- Burnout Paradise
- Burnout Revenge
- Call of Duty 2: Special Edition
- Call of Duty 3
- Call of Duty 4: Modern Warfare
- Call of Duty: Modern Warfare 2
- Call of Duty: Black Ops
- Call of Duty: Black Ops II
- Call of Duty: Black Ops III
- Call of Duty: World at War
- Capcom Platinum Hits Triple Pack
- Cars
- Condemned: Criminal Origins
- Crackdown
- Crysis 2
- Dance Central
- Dante's Inferno
- Dark Souls
- Dead Island: Game of the Year Edition
- Dead or Alive 4
- Dead Rising
- Dead Rising 2
- Dead Space
- Dead Space 2
- Dead Space 3
- Devil May Cry 4
- Dishonored
- Fable II
- Fallout 3: Game of the Year Edition
- Fallout: New Vegas - Ultimate Edition
- Far Cry 3
- Far Cry 4
- Farming Simulator 15
- F.E.A.R.
- Fight Night Round 3
- Final Fantasy XIII
- Forza Horizon
- Forza Motorsport 2
- Forza Motorsport 3
- Forza Motorsport 4
- Game Party: In Motion
- Gears of War
- Gears of War 2
- Grand Theft Auto: Episodes from Liberty City
- Grand Theft Auto IV
- Grand Theft Auto V
- Grand Theft Auto: San Andreas
- Guitar Hero: Aerosmith
- Guitar Hero III: Legends of Rock
- Halo: Combat Evolved Anniversary
- Halo 3
- Halo 3: ODST
- Halo: Reach
- Halo Wars
- Homefront
- Injustice: Gods Among Us - Ultimate Edition
- Just Dance 3
- Just Dance 4
- Kameo: Elements of Power
- Kinect Joy Ride
- Kinect Sports
- Kinectimals
- L.A. Noire
- Left 4 Dead
- Left 4 Dead 2
- Lego Batman: The Videogame
- Lego Batman 2: DC Super Heroes
- Lego Harry Potter: Years 1–4
- Lego Indiana Jones: The Original Adventures
- Lego Indiana Jones 2: The Adventure Continues
- Lego Marvel Super Heroes
- Lego Pirates of the Caribbean: The Video Game
- Lego Star Wars: The Complete Saga
- Lego Star Wars II: The Original Trilogy
- Lego Star Wars III: The Clone Wars
- Lego The Lord of the Rings
- Lost Planet: Extreme Condition Colonies Edition
- Mafia II
- Marvel: Ultimate Alliance
- Mass Effect
- Mass Effect 2
- Medal of Honor
- Medal of Honor: Warfighter
- Mercenaries 2: World in Flames
- Michael Jackson: The Experience
- Midnight Club Los Angeles: Complete Edition
- Mortal Kombat Komplete Edition
- Mortal Kombat vs. DC Universe
- MX vs. ATV Alive
- MX vs. ATV Reflex
- MX vs. ATV Untamed
- Need for Speed: Hot Pursuit
- Need for Speed: Most Wanted
- Need for Speed: Most Wanted - A Criterion Game
- Need for Speed: ProStreet
- Need for Speed Rivals
- Need for Speed: Shift
- Need for Speed: The Run
- Need for Speed: Undercover
- Ninja Gaiden II
- Perfect Dark Zero
- Plants vs. Zombies
- Plants vs. Zombies: Garden Warfare
- Portal 2
- Prey
- Project Gotham Racing 3
- Prototype
- Rage
- Ratatouille
- Red Dead Redemption
- Resident Evil 5
- Resident Evil 6
- Rock Band - Complete Edition
- Rock Band 2 - Premium Edition
- Rock Band 3 - Ultimate Edition
- Rockstar Games Presents Table Tennis
- Saints Row
- Saints Row 2
- Saints Row: The Third
- Saints Row IV National Treasure Edition
- Sesame Street: Once Upon a Monster
- Shrek the Third
- Sniper: Ghost Warrior
- Skate 2
- Skate 3
- Sonic Free Riders
- Sonic Generations
- Sonic the Hedgehog
- Sonic's Ultimate Genesis Collection
- Sonic Unleashed
- Soulcalibur IV
- South Park: The Stick of Truth
- Spider-Man 3
- Spider-Man: Friend or Foe
- Star Wars: The Force Unleashed
- Star Wars: The Force Unleashed II
- Street Fighter IV
- Tekken 6
- Terraria
- The Biggest Loser: Ultimate Workout
- The Elder Scrolls IV: Oblivion Game Of The Year Edition
- The Elder Scrolls V: Skyrim Legendary Edition
- The Evil Within
- The Orange Box
- The Sims 3
- Titanfall
- Tom Clancy's Ghost Recon Advanced Warfighter
- Tom Clancy's Ghost Recon Advanced Warfighter 2
- Tom Clancy's Ghost Recon: Future Soldier
- Tom Clancy's Rainbow Six: Vegas
- Tom Clancy's Rainbow Six: Vegas 2
- Tom Clancy's Splinter Cell: Blacklist
- Tom Clancy's Splinter Cell: Conviction
- Tomb Raider
- Tony Hawk's Project 8
- Top Spin 2
- Transformers: The Game
- UFC Personal Trainer: The Ultimate Fitness System
- UFC 2009 Undisputed
- UFC Undisputed 3
- Viva Piñata
- Watch Dogs
- WWE '12
- WWE SmackDown vs. Raw 2007
- WWE SmackDown vs. Raw 2008
- WWE SmackDown vs. Raw 2009
- WWE SmackDown vs. Raw 2010
- Your Shape: Fitness Evolved
- Your Shape: Fitness Evolved 2012

=== Games in Xbox 360 Classics (PAL) ===
- Army of Two
- Army of Two: The 40th Day
- Assassin's Creed
- Assassin's Creed II
- Assassin's Creed III
- Assassin's Creed IV: Black Flag
- Assassin's Creed: Brotherhood
- Assassin's Creed Revelations
- Assassin's Creed Rogue
- Batman: Arkham Asylum
- Batman: Arkham Asylum - Game of the Year Edition
- Batman: Arkham City
- Battlefield 3
- Battlefield 4
- Battlefield: Bad Company
- Battlefield: Bad Company 2
- Battlefield Hardline
- Beijing 2008
- BioShock
- BioShock 2
- BioShock Infinite
- Borderlands
- Borderlands - Game of the Year Edition
- Brink
- Brothers in Arms: Hell's Highway
- Bulletstorm
- Burnout Paradise
- Burnout Revenge
- Call of Duty 2
- Call of Duty 3
- Call of Duty 4: Modern Warfare
- Call of Duty: Modern Warfare 2
- Call of Duty: World at War
- Colin McRae: Dirt
- Command & Conquer 3: Tiberium Wars
- Condemned
- Crackdown
- Crash of the Titans
- Crysis 2
- Crysis 3
- Dante's Inferno
- Dark Souls - Prepare to Die Edition
- Darksiders
- Darksiders II
- Dead Island - Game of the Year Edition
- Dead Island: Riptide - Complete Edition
- Dead or Alive 4
- Dead Rising
- Dead Rising 2
- Dead Space
- Dead Space 2
- Dead Space 3
- Deus Ex: Human Revolution
- DiRT 3
- Dishonored - Game of the Year Edition
- Disney LEGO Pirates of the Caribbean: The Video Game
- Disney•Pixar: Cars 2
- Disney•Pixar: Ratatouille
- Disney•Pixar: Toy Story 3
- Disney•Pixar: WALL-E
- Disney Universe
- Dragon Age: Origins
- Dragon Age II
- Dragon Ball: Raging Blast
- Dragon Ball: Raging Blast 2
- Dragon Ball Z: Burst Limit
- Dragon Ball Z: Ultimate Tenkaichi
- Driver: San Francisco
- EA Sports Fight Night: Round 3
- EA Sports Fight Night: Round 4
- F1 2012
- Fable II
- Fallout 3
- Fallout 3 - Game of the Year Edition
- Fallout: New Vegas - Ultimate Edition
- Far Cry 2
- Far Cry 3
- Far Cry 4
- Farming Simulator 15
- FIFA 07
- FIFA 08
- FIFA 09
- FIFA 10
- FIFA 11
- FIFA 12
- FIFA 13
- FIFA 14
- FIFA 15
- FIFA 16
- FIFA Street
- FIFA Street 3
- Final Fantasy XIII
- Forza 2 Motorsport
- Forza Horizon
- Forza Motorsport 3 - Ultimate Collection
- Gears of War
- Gears of War 2
- Grand Theft Auto IV
- Grand Theft Auto: Episodes From Liberty City
- Grand Theft Auto: San Andreas
- Halo 3
- Halo 3: ODST
- Halo Wars
- Hitman: Absolution
- Hitman: Blood Money
- James Cameron's Avatar: The Game
- Just Cause 2
- Just Dance 2014
- Just Dance 2015
- Just Dance 3
- Just Dance 4
- Kameo: Elements of Power
- Kane & Lynch: Dead Men
- L.A. Noire
- Left 4 Dead
- Left 4 Dead - Game of the Year Edition
- Left 4 Dead 2
- Lego Batman: The Videogame
- Lego Batman 2: DC Super Heroes
- Lego Batman 3: Beyond Gotham
- Lego Harry Potter: Years 1–4
- Lego Harry Potter: Years 5–7
- Lego Indiana Jones: The Original Adventures
- Lego Indiana Jones 2: The Adventure Continues
- LEGO The Lord of the Rings
- Lego Marvel Super Heroes
- Lego Star Wars: The Complete Saga
- Lego Star Wars II: The Original Trilogy
- Lego Star Wars III: The Clone Wars
- Lego The Hobbit
- LEGO The Movie Videogame
- Lost Planet: Extreme Condition - Colonies Edition
- Mafia II
- Mass Effect
- Mass Effect 2
- Mass Effect 3
- Medal of Honor
- Medal of Honor: Airborne
- Medal of Honor: Warfighter
- Metro 2033
- Midnight Club: Los Angeles - Complete Edition
- Mirror's Edge
- Monopoly Streets
- Mortal Kombat
- MotionSports: Play for Real
- MotoGP'06
- MX vs ATV: Alive
- MX vs ATV: Reflex
- Naruto: Rise of a Ninja
- Naruto Shippuden: Ultimate Ninja Storm 2
- Naruto Shippuden: Ultimate Ninja Storm 3: Full Burst
- Naruto Shippuden: Ultimate Ninja Storm: Generations
- Need for Speed: Carbon
- Need for Speed: Hot Pursuit
- Need for Speed: Most Wanted
- Need for Speed: Most Wanted: A Criterion Game
- Need for Speed: ProStreet
- Need for Speed Rivals
- Need for Speed: Shift
- Need for Speed: The Run
- Need for Speed: Undercover
- Payday 2
- Perfect Dark Zero
- Peter Jackson's King Kong: The Official Game of the Movie
- Portal 2
- Prince of Persia
- Pro Evolution Soccer 6
- Pro Evolution Soccer 2008
- Pro Evolution Soccer 2009
- Pro Evolution Soccer 2010
- Pro Evolution Soccer 2011
- Pro Evolution Soccer 2013
- Project Gotham Racing 3
- Project Gotham Racing 4
- Prototype
- Racedriver Grid
- Racedriver Grid: Reloaded
- Rage
- Raving Rabbids: Alive & Kicking
- Rayman Legends
- Rayman Origins
- Red Dead Redemption
- Red Dead Redemption - Game of the Year Edition
- Resident Evil 5
- Resident Evil 5 - Gold Edition
- Rockstar Games Presents Table Tennis
- Saints Row
- Saints Row 2
- Saints Row: The Third - The Full Package
- SEGA Mega Drive: Ultimate Collection
- Sega Superstars Tennis
- Shrek The Third
- Skate.
- Skate 3
- Sleeping Dogs
- SmackDown vs Raw 2007
- SmackDown vs Raw 2008
- SmackDown vs Raw 2009
- SmackDown vs Raw 2010
- SmackDown vs Raw 2011
- Sniper Elite V2
- Sniper: Ghost Warrior
- Sonic & All-Stars Racing: Transformed
- Sonic & SEGA All-Stars Racing: with Banjo-Kazooie
- Sonic: Generations
- Sonic: Unleashed
- Soulcalibur IV
- South Park: The Stick of Truth
- Spider-Man 3
- SSX
- Star Wars: The Force Unleashed
- Star Wars: The Force Unleashed - Ultimate Sith Edition
- Star Wars: The Force Unleashed II
- Street Fighter IV
- Tekken 6
- Tekken: Tag Tournament 2
- Terraria
- Test Drive Unlimited
- The Elder Scrolls IV: Oblivion
- The Elder Scrolls IV: Oblivion - 5th Anniversary Edition
- The Elder Scrolls IV: Oblivion - Game of the Year Edition
- The Elder Scrolls V: Skyrim
- The Elder Scrolls V: Skyrim - Legendary Edition
- The Outfit
- The Simpsons Game
- The Sims 3
- The Smurfs 2
- The Witcher 2: Assassins of Kings - Enhanced Edition
- Titanfall
- Tom Clancy's EndWar
- Tom Clancy's Ghost Recon: Advanced Warfighter
- Tom Clancy's Ghost Recon: Advanced Warfighter 2 - Legacy Edition
- Tom Clancy's Ghost Recon: Future Soldier
- Tom Clancy's Rainbow Six: Vegas
- Tom Clancy's Rainbow Six: Vegas 2
- Tom Clancy's Rainbow Six: Vegas 2 - Complete Edition
- Tom Clancy's Splinter Cell: Blacklist
- Tom Clancy's Splinter Cell: Conviction
- Tom Clancy's Splinter Cell: Double Agent
- Tomb Raider
- Tomb Raider: Legend
- Tomb Raider: Underworld
- UFC 2009 Undisputed
- UFC Undisputed 2010
- Viva Piñata
- Watch_Dogs
- Your Shape: Fitness Evolved
- Your Shape: Fitness Evolved 2012

=== Games in Xbox 360 Platinum Collection (NTSC[J]) ===
- Ace Combat 6: Fires of Liberation
- Ace Combat: Assault Horizon
- Alan Wake
- Armored Core 4
- Armored Core: For Answer
- Assassin's Creed
- Assassin's Creed II: Special Edition
- Assassin's Creed: Brotherhood Special Edition
- Assassin's Creed: Revelations Special Edition
- Assassin's Creed I + II Welcome Pack
- Atsumare! Pinata
- Atsumare! Viva Pinata 2: Garden wa Dai-Punch
- Banjo to Kazooie no Daibouken: Garage Daisakusen
- Battlefield 2: Modern Combat
- Battlefield 3
- Battlefield: Bad Company
- Battlefield: Bad Company 2 Ultimate Edition
- Bayonetta
- Beautiful Katamari Damacy
- BioHazard 5
- BioHazard 6
- BioShock
- BlazBlue: Calamity Trigger
- Blue Dragon
- Borderlands
- Bullet Witch
- Burnout Revenge
- Call of Duty 4: Modern Warfare
- Call of Duty: Modern Warfare 2
- Chaos;Head Noah
- Chaos;Head Love Chu Chu!
- Chikyū Bōeigun 3
- Chromehounds
- Dance Central
- Dance Central 2
- Dance Evolution
- Dead or Alive 4
- Dead or Alive Xtreme 2
- Dead Rising
- Dead Rising 2
- Dead Rising/Gears of War Platinum Double Pack
- Deathsmiles
- Deathsmiles II
- Dennō Senki Virtual-On Force
- Devil May Cry 4
- DoDonPachi Daifukkatsu Ver 1.5
- DoDonPachi SaiDaiŌJō
- Dragon Age: Origins
- Dragon's Dogma
- Dream Club
- Dream Club Zero
- Earth Defense Force: Insect Armageddon
- End of Eternity
- Espgaluda II Black Label
- Every Party
- Fable II
- Fable III
- Fallout 3
- Fallout 3: Game Of The Year Edition
- Far Cry 2
- Fight Night Round 3
- Final Fantasy XIII
- Final Fantasy XIII-2
- Forza Motorsport 2
- Forza Motorsport 4
- Gears of War
- Gears of War 2
- Gears of War 3
- Gears of War: Judgment
- Gears of War Twin Pack
- Gears of War: Trilogy Pack
- Grand Theft Auto IV
- Gundam Musō International
- Gundam Musō 2
- Gundam Musō 3
- Halo 3
- Halo 3: ODST
- Halo: Reach
- Halo Wars
- Hokuto Musō
- Infinite Undiscovery
- Kinect Disneyland Adventures
- Kinect Rush: A Disney-Pixar Adventure
- Kinect Sports
- Kinect Sports: Season Two
- Kinect Star Wars
- Kingdom Under Fire: Circle of Doom
- Left 4 Dead
- Left 4 Dead 2
- Lollipop Chainsaw
- Lost Odyssey
- Lost Planet: Colonies
- Lost Planet: Extreme Condition
- Lost Planet 2
- MagnaCarta 2
- Mass Effect
- Mass Effect 2
- Mushihimesama Futari Ver 1.5
- Need for Speed: Most Wanted
- Nier Gestalt
- Ninety-Nine Nights
- Ninja Blade
- Ninja Gaiden II
- Oneechanbara VorteX: The Descendants of The Cursed Blood
- Otomedius G
- Perfect Dark Zero
- Prince of Persia
- Project Gotham Racing 3
- Project Gotham Racing 4
- Project Sylpheed
- Riot Act
- Riot Act 2
- Rockstar Games Presents Table Tennis
- Rumble Roses XX
- Sacred 2: Fallen Angel
- Saints Row
- Saints Row 2
- Saints Row: The Third
- Senko No Ronde Rev.X
- Shin Sangoku Musō 5
- Sonic Free Riders
- Soulcalibur IV
- Steins;Gate
- Steins;Gate: Hiyoku Renri no Darling
- Super Street Fighter IV: Arcade Edition
- Super Robot Taisen XO
- Tales of Vesperia
- Tekken 6
- Tekken Tag Tournament 2
- Tenchu Senran
- Test Drive Unlimited
- The Elder Scrolls IV: Oblivion
- The Elder Scrolls IV: Oblivion Game Of The Year Edition
- The Elder Scrolls V: Skyrim
- The Idolm@ster
- The Idolm@ster 2
- The Idolm@ster Live For You!
- The Idolmaster Twins
- The Last Remnant
- Tom Clancy's Ghost Recon Advanced Warfighter
- Tom Clancy's H.A.W.X
- Tom Clancy's Rainbow Six: Vegas
- Tom Clancy's Rainbow Six: Vegas 2
- Tom Clancy's Splinter Cell: Conviction
- Tropico 3
- Trusty Bell: Chopin no Yume Reprise
- Virtua Fighter 5: Live Arena

== Xbox One ==
=== Games in Greatest Hits for Xbox One series ===
- Assassin's Creed IV: Black Flag
- Assassin's Creed: Brotherhood
- Assassin's Creed Unity
- Assassin's Creed Syndicate
- Bioshock: The Collection
- Borderlands 3
- Borderlands: The Handsome Collection
- Bully
- Call of Duty 2
- Call of Duty 3
- Call of Duty: Black Ops
- Call of Duty: Black Ops II
- Call of Duty: Ghosts
- Call of Duty: Modern Warfare Remastered
- Call of Duty: Modern Warfare 2
- Call of Duty: Modern Warfare 3
- The Crew
- Tom Clancy's The Division
- Dead Rising 3
- Dishonored 2
- Doom
- The Elder Scrolls IV: Oblivion
- Far Cry 3
- Far Cry 4
- Forza Horizon 2
- Forza Motorsport 5
- Forza Motorsport 6
- Gears of War: Ultimate Edition
- Halo: The Master Chief Collection
- Halo 5: Guardians
- Killer Instinct
- Kinect Sports Rivals
- NBA 2K20
- Need for Speed Rivals
- Rayman Legends
- Rayman Origins
- Rise of the Tomb Raider
- Ryse: Son of Rome
- Sunset Overdrive
- Tom Clancy's Rainbow Six Siege
- Watch Dogs
- Wolfenstein: The New Order
- Zoo Tycoon

== See also ==
- List of Xbox games
- List of Xbox 360 games
