= Your Shape: Fitness Evolved 2012 =

2011 video game

- Australian cover art
- Developer: Ubisoft Montreal
- Publisher: Ubisoft
- Series: Your Shape
- Platform: Xbox 360
- Release: NA: November 8, 2011; AS: November 10, 2011; EU: November 11, 2011; JP: November 17, 2011; AU: December 15, 2011; Digital release; WW: October 2, 2012
- Genres: Exergaming, aerobics
- Modes: Single-player, multiplayer

Your Shape: Fitness Evolved 2012 is a fitness video game developed by Ubisoft Montreal and published by Ubisoft. The game was released on November 8, 2011, in North America, November 11, 2011, in Europe, November 17, 2011, in Japan, and on December 15, 2011, in Australia for the Xbox 360. The game was released on the Xbox Live Marketplace on October 2, 2012. The game is the sequel to Your Shape: Fitness Evolved and uses the Kinect motion sensor.

== Gameplay ==
The game uses "player projection" technology to capture the player's shape and form, dynamically incorporate them into the in-game environment, and tailor routines for the player. The game has activities, some related to skipping or running, workouts, including a few for the player's abdominal muscles, health, and glutes, and classes, which include yoga and dance courses. The game allows the player to track the calories lost while following personal goals to work for.

== Reception ==
Reception

Aggregate score
Aggregator	Score
Metacritic	77/100

Review scores
Publication	Score
Eurogamer	7/10
GamesMaster	7.9/10
IGN	7.5/10
Jeuxvideo.com	16/20
Official Xbox Magazine (UK)	8/10
Official Xbox Magazine (US)	7.5/10
Game Rant	3.5/5
The Guardian	4/5

Your Shape: Fitness Evolved 2012 received "generally favorable" reviews according to review aggregator website Metacritic.

Daniele Cucchiarelli for Eurogamer.it rated the game 7/10, stating that "if, however, you are a beginner in physical activity but already own the previous chapter, there are not enough reasons to purchase this new software, and for this reason, its rating can only be lower."

Fran Mirabella for IGN rated the game 7.5/10, stating that "this virtual, block-breaking environment is the kind of activity that has the most potential. The standard training is great, but it's not new and not doing much more than watching instructional videos would. The product shines most when it combines a virtual distraction with true, calorie-burning benefits."

Jeuxvideo.com rated the game 16/20, stating that "this new version of Your Shape: Fitness Evolved is not without its flaws, but it nevertheless constitutes for the moment what is best in terms of fitness software using Kinect. The title stands out from its competitors by offering impeccable production, perfect movement recognition, and substantial content."

Jon Blyth for the Official Xbox Magazine (UK) rated the game 8/10, stating that "Your Shape provides decent replacements for both of these things, with all the arbitrary but absorbing nonsense of leveling up, medals, and badges. This might be the first fitness game we'll use after reviewing it,". In contrast, Alaina Yee for the Official Xbox Magazine (US) rated the game 7.5/10, stating that "overall, YSFE 2012 mixes together components from EA Sports Active 2, UFC Personal Trainer, and the first Your Shape mostly well, but its polish and depth can’t hide its irksome design flaw."

Game Rant rated the game 3.5/5 stars, stating that "Fitness Evolved can be a great way to get moving, but only if other exercise advice is taken from somewhere else." Similarly, Mary Hamilton for The Guardian rated the game 4/5 stars, stating that "if you want something simple and light that'll work around a busy schedule, it's great."

The game featured on OutsideXbox's 'Show of the Week: Evolve and 5 Games That Don't Know What Evolution Means,' where the cast comment on it misusing the word "evolved" in its title.

=== Awards and accolades ===
The game won in the category of 'Best Technology' at the Canadian Videogame Awards and was nominated for the category of 'Best Sports/Fitness Game' at the 8th British Academy Games Awards.

List of awards and nominations
Year	Award	Category	Recipient	Result	Ref.
2012	8th British Academy Games Awards	Best Sports/Fitness Game	Your Shape: Fitness Evolved 2012	Nominated	
2012	Canadian Videogame Awards	Best Technology	Your Shape: Fitness Evolved 2012	Won	
