= EA Sports Active NFL Training Camp =

2010 video game

- The box art of EA Sports Active NFL Training Camp
- Developer: EA Canada
- Publisher: EA Sports
- Platform: Wii
- Release: NA: November 16, 2010
- Genre: Fitness
- Modes: Single-player, multiplayer

EA Sports Active NFL Training Camp is an American football-based fitness video game developed by EA Canada and published by EA Sports for the Nintendo Wii. The game was released on the same day as EA Sports Active 2.

The game has the National Football League license, which allows players to work out with any team and player of their choice in a training camp environment.

== Gameplay ==
In NFL Training Camp, players perform various drills that are commonly performed in the NFL Scouting Combine, such as the 40-yard dash. At the end of every drill, a graph displays how many calories the player burned, as well as the player's median heart rate. Players are rewarded with points and achievements for their performance. The player may also participate in the NFL Combine 60-Day Challenge, which lets players work for four days per week for 60 days in the drills performed in the Combine. Points and achievements earned by the player can be compared to other people. who have played on the console, as well as people on the player's friend list. The game also has set up public groups for players to join, and players can contribute their stats to their team.

The game was developed with the collaboration of various NFL strength and conditioning coaches. The game is compatible with the Wii Balance Board. Unlike the past two games, NFL Training Camp has "Total Body Tracking", which uses a heart monitor to measure the player's heart rate during play, along with a wireless motion tracker which goes on the leg, while the heart rate monitor goes on the arm, unlike the other games, which makes use of a leg pouch and the Nunchuck.

The game's online compatibility is used by plugging a USB flash drive into the back of the console, and progress that the player makes in the game is automatically recorded and posted on the player's online profile. EA discontinued the game's online service on April 13, 2012.

== Reception ==
Reception

Review scores
Publication	Score
GameSpot	8.2/10
Operation Sports	7.5/10

Operation Sports gave the game a 7.5/10, praising the drills, workouts, and equipment, but criticized the feedback and motion problems.
