= Your Shape: Fitness Evolved 2013 =

2012 fitness video game

- European cover art
- Developer: Blue Byte
- Publisher: Ubisoft
- Series: Your Shape
- Platform: Wii U
- Release: NA: November 18, 2012; EU/AU: November 30, 2012
- Genres: Exergaming, aerobics
- Modes: Single-player, multiplayer

Your Shape: Fitness Evolved 2013 is a fitness video game developed by Blue Byte and published by Ubisoft. The game was released on November 18, 2012, in North America, and on November 30, 2012, in Australia and Europe for the Wii U. The game is the sequel to Your Shape: Fitness Evolved 2012 for the Xbox 360.

== Gameplay ==
The players can create a personal profile, inputting details such as age, weight, and fitness objectives to customize their workout routines. The game offers a variety of exercises, including cardio, strength training, flexibility exercises, and yoga routines.

Four different gameplay modes are available: Activities, Classes, Programs, and Workouts. They include structured workout programs, basic fitness lessons, dance routines, individual exercises, and multiplayer challenges. Structured programs guide players through predefined workout routines tailored to specific fitness goals, while individual exercises allow users to target specific muscle groups or focus on preferred activities. Multiplayer challenges introduce competitive elements, where the players can take part in events against friends or online users.

Real-time feedback is provided throughout the gameplay, including metrics such as calories burned, heart rate monitoring, and technique corrections. A virtual coach assists players during exercises, offering guidance and motivation.

== Reception ==
Reception

Aggregate score
Aggregator	Score
Metacritic	76/100

Review scores
Publication	Score
Jeuxvideo.com	13/20
Nintendo Life	8/10 stars
Nintendo World Report	7/10
Official Nintendo Magazine	80%

Your Shape: Fitness Evolved 2013 received "generally favorable" reviews according to review aggregator website Metacritic.

Jeuxvideo.com rated the game 13/20, stating that "Your Shape: Fitness Evolved 2013 is a very recommendable software dedicated to fitness, even if movement recognition is very limited. But motivated players, who perhaps already know a few rules allowing them to perform these exercises in complete safety, should find what they are looking for, in particular thanks to the fairly varied and quality content."

Morgan Sleeper for Nintendo Life rated the game 8/10, stating that, "For players that want to add some exercise to their gaming routine, or Wii Fit junkies looking for a next generation fitness fix, Your Shape Fitness is an excellent choice." Also stating that "more than just a tide-over until Wii Fit U, Your Shape Fitness Evolved 2013 takes its place on the Wii U as one of the finest fitness games available anywhere."

Scott Thompson for Nintendo World Report rated the game 7/10, stating that "Your Shape: Fitness Evolved 2013 is a solid game. The variety of things to do as well as the auxiliary features, such as the news feed and recipe section, set it apart from its competitors; whatever you are looking for in your workout routine, Your Shape has something for you."

Joe Skrebels for the Official Nintendo Magazine rated the game 80%, stating that the game is "professional, fully featured and a tad bodacious, (and that the game) undoubtedly sets a high bar for fitness games on Wii U."
