= Your Shape: Fitness Evolved =

2010 video game

- Developer: Ubisoft Montreal
- Publisher: Ubisoft
- Platform: Xbox 360
- Release: NA: November 4, 2010; EU: November 10, 2010; AU: November 18, 2010; JP: December 9, 2010
- Genres: Exergaming, aerobics

Your Shape: Fitness Evolved is a fitness game developed and published by Ubisoft. The game was released in November 2010 as a launch title for Kinect, a motion tracking sensor accessory for the Xbox 360. It is a sequel to Your Shape, making it the second game in the franchise.

== Gameplay ==
The game uses "player projection" technology to capture the player's shape and form, dynamically incorporate them into the in-game environment, and tailor routines for the player. The game also features more emphasis on the use of resistance training, along with exercise programs developed in partnership with the magazines Men's Health and Women's Health. The game allows the player to track the calories loss, while following personal goals to work for.

== Downloadable content ==
The game also features new routines and programs as downloadable content; Ubisoft initially released two programs as DLC in December 2010, The Toned Body Program and Cardio Boxing Platinum, and promised a total of 12 packs would be released for the game. with the third pack coming in January 2011. The game also features integration with Ubisoft's Uplay platform, allowing users to track, share their progress, and send challenges to other players online.

== Reception ==
Reception

Aggregate score
Aggregator	Score
Metacritic	73/100

Review scores
Publication	Score
Destructoid	8/10
Eurogamer	6/10
GameRevolution	C+
GameSpot	7/10
GameZone	7/10
Hardcore Gamer	3.75/5
IGN	7/10
Jeuxvideo.com	13/20
Joystiq	3/5
Official Xbox Magazine (US)	8.5/10
PALGN	7.5/10
Metro	7/10

The game received "mixed or average reviews" according to the review aggregation website Metacritic.

IGN considered that while it was not a "perfect" game (considering it was only an initial title for Kinect, and due to accuracy issues), it was still one of the best health games for Kinect, praising the level of feedback and motivation the game provides for players to perform the exercises correctly, and its futuristic Minority Report-styled graphical look and environments (which set it apart from the more "cartoonish" look of other Kinect games).

== Sequels ==
A sequel was released in 2011, Your Shape: Fitness Evolved 2012. Another sequel was announced at E3 2012, Your Shape: Fitness Evolved 2013, for the Wii U.
