= PlayMotion =

Video game company

PlayMotion, Inc.
- Type: Private
- Industry: Video games
- Founded: July 4, 2003
- Headquarters: Atlanta, Georgia United States
- Key people: Greg Roberts (Chief Designer); Anthony Cowan (EVP); Jeremy Barrett (VP Engineering); Wes Lewison (VP Sales)
- Products: PlaySDK; PlaySDK/pro; CORE
- Website: www.PlayMotion.com www.playSDK.com

PlayMotion! is a company that produces a next generation videogame technology of the same name. Their product applies practical Computer Vision algorithms to the problem of gesture recognition in a wide array of environments, including Education and exergaming.

PlayMotion, in essence, "allows players to use the wall of the room as a videogame surface", while "a graphics engine and video projector turn your actions into digital shapes and patterns on a large screen."

PlayMotion was founded by designer Greg Roberts and noted computer vision scientist Matt Flagg in 2003.

The company has a partnership with Carnegie Mellon's Entertainment Technology Center (ETC) who uses the platform to create next generation videogame and novel live performance concepts.

PlayMotion builds upon the pioneering work done by visionary Myron Krueger in the 1970s and 1980s. Their internal Funlab is an R&D incubator allowing for free thought and autonomous action which has produced many games and technologies throughout the years, including a landmark 5-screen, 250 player experience at Disney's Epcot in Orlando, Florida.

In 2009, PlayMotion released version 1.0 of a comprehensive SDK based on the Python programming language, one of the first software development kits to focus specifically on computer vision for entertainment application design.
