= Playdale Playgrounds =

British playground company

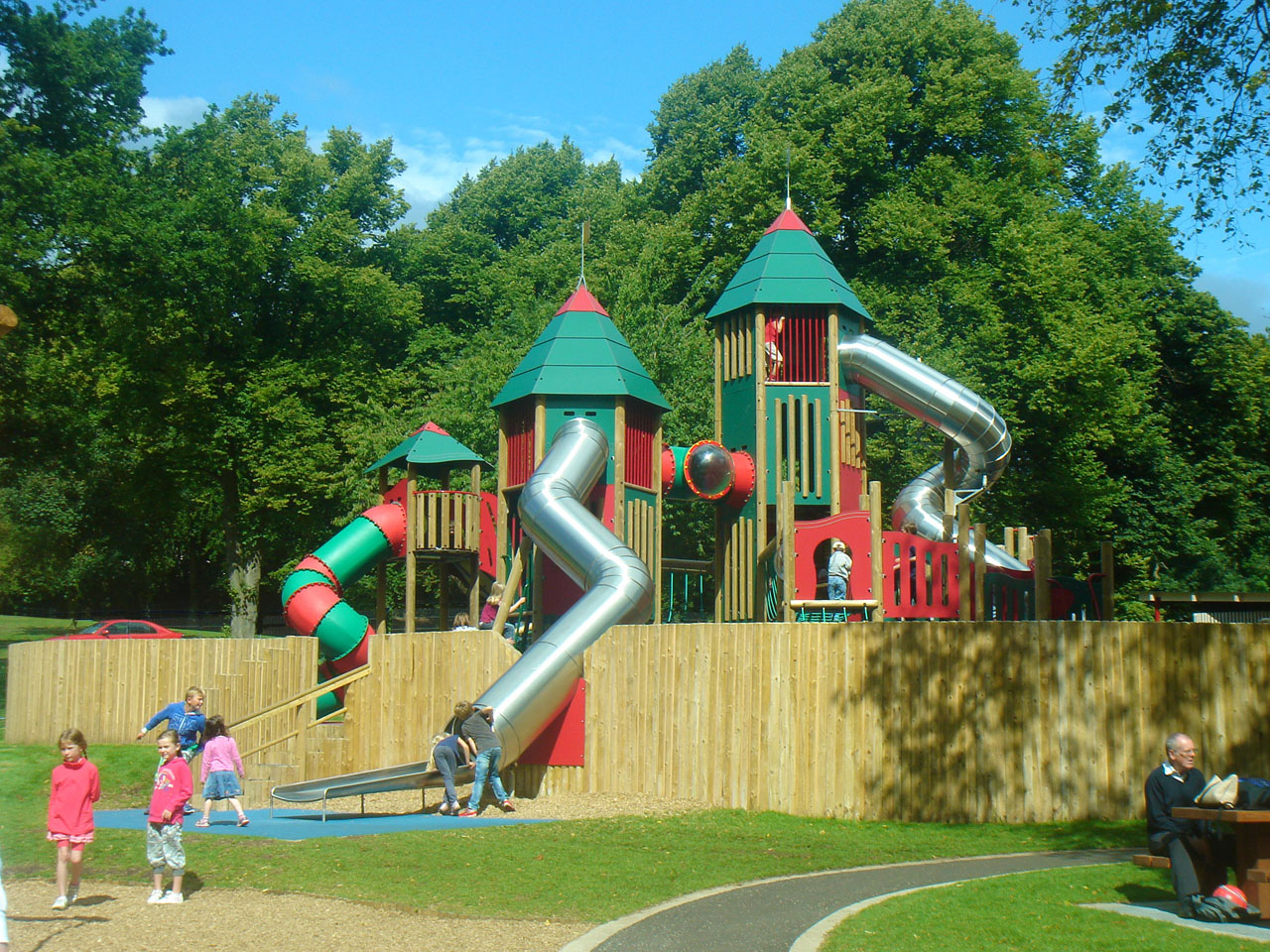
- Playdale's Mountain Tower range
- Industry: Playground design and manufacture
- Founded: 1978; 48 years ago in the Lake District, England
- Founders: Jack Croasdale; John Croasdale
- Headquarters: Haverthwaite, Cumbria, England
- Website: playdale.co.uk

Playdale Playgrounds is a British playground design, manufacturing and installation company founded in 1978 by Jack and John Croasdale. Playdale Playgrounds is based in Haverthwaite, Cumbria.)

== History ==
Playdale Playgrounds is a family-run business. The Croasdale family have worked in the forestry and allied timber trades since 1735. In 1978 Jack and John Croasdale advanced into playground design, manufacturing and installation and established Playdale Playgrounds in the Lake District with four employees. Playdale later had over 140 employees with two factories in Cumbria. In 1981, Playdale Playgrounds designed and launched the Adventure Trail which became a landmark product range, eventually the stainless steel 'City' range followed. In 1996 Sir Chris Bonington opened the company's new factory and offices in Haverthwaite. By 1999 all of Playdale Playgrounds products were Kitemarked to BSEN 1176. Playdale are now owned by BCI Burke.

== Diversification ==
The introduction of the City Stainless Steel Play Equipment in 2003, saw the company diversify from solely producing timber play equipment. The world's first i.play was created in 2007 and opened in Barrow Park, Barrow-in-Furness. This was the first electronic, intelligent play system, designed in collaboration with Progressive Sports Technologies Ltd at Loughborough University.

== Worldwide company ==
In 2010, the company began exporting products and now have a number of overseas distributors. In 2013, Playdale Playgrounds were named as one of the top thirty ‘Export Champions’ for the North West as part of a national campaign ran by UK Trade & Investment. In December 2014 Playdale Playgrounds were awarded the 'Emerging Exporter' award at the Insider Media North West International Trade Awards 2014.
