= Fitness game =

Video games that are also a form of exercise

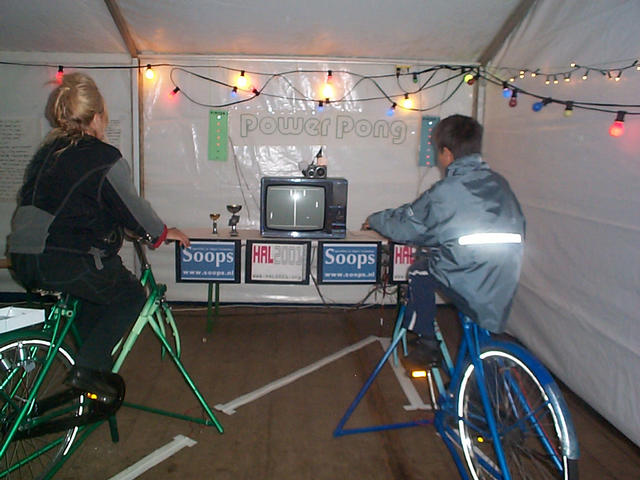
Game of Power Pong (a bicycle powered video game) being played at the "Hackers At Large" conference, held in Enschede, Netherlands

Fitness game, exergame, and gamercise (portmanteaus of "exercise" and "game") are terms used for video games that are also a form of exercise. Fitness games rely on technology that tracks body movement or reaction. The genre has been used to challenge the stereotype of gaming as a sedentary activity, and promoting an active lifestyle among gamers. Fitness games are seen as evolving from technology aimed at making exercise more fun.

== History ==
The genre's roots can be found in game peripherals released in the eighties, including the Joyboard, an Atari 2600 peripheral developed by Amiga and released in 1982, the Power Pad (or Family Trainer) a peripheral for the Nintendo Entertainment System (NES), originally released by Bandai in 1986, and the Foot Craz released for the Atari 2600 in 1987, although all three had limited success. Konami's Dance Dance Revolution (1998) was cited as one of the first major fitness games; when it was ported from the arcade to PlayStation, it sold over three million copies. In the 2000s, a number of devices and games have used the exergame style to much success: the EyeToy camera has sold over ten million units, while Nintendo's Wii Fit has sold in excess of 21 million copies. By June 2009, health games were generating revenues of $2 billion, largely due to Wii Fit's 18.22 million sales at the time. The term exergaming entered the Collins English Dictionary in 2007.

The genre has been promoted as a way to improve users' health through exercise, but few studies have been undertaken to measure the health benefits. Smaller trials have yielded mixed results and have shown that the respective traditional methods of exercise are superior to their video game equivalents. Design considerations for fitness games include the need to balance the physical effectiveness of the exercise with the attractiveness of the gameplay, with both factors needed to be adapted to the abilities of the player, referred to as 'dual flow'.

=== 1980s ===
Fitness games contain elements that were developed in the virtual reality community during the 1980s. The pioneer in this area was Autodesk, which developed two systems, the HighCycle and Virtual Racquetball. The HighCycle was an exercise bike that a user would pedal through a virtual landscape. If the user pedaled fast enough, the virtual bike would take off and fly over the landscape. Virtual Racquetball tracked the position and orientation of an actual racquet that was used to hit a virtual ball in a virtual environment. This environment was shared with another user equipped with another tracked racquet, allowing the two users to play each other over phone lines. In both systems, the users could wear the VPL eyephones, an early head-mounted display (HMD), that would provide more immersion for the user.

The first true attempt at what would later be called Exertainment was the Atari Puffer project (1982). This was an exercise bike that would hook up to an Atari 400/800 or 5200 system. Forward speed was controlled by pedaling while steering and additional gameplay was handled by a handlebar-mounted Gamepad. The machine was nearly ready for production with several games (Tumbleweeds and Jungle River Cruise) when Atari declared bankruptcy and the Puffer project was abandoned. The Joyboard for the Atari 2600 was also released in 1982, by the Amiga Corporation.

In Japan, Bandai dabbled in this space with the Family Trainer pad, released in 1986 for the Family Computer. In 1988, Nintendo acquired the North American rights to the pad, and marketed it for the Nintendo Entertainment System as the Power Pad in North America.

The first fitness game system released to the market was the 1986 CompuTrainer by RacerMate Inc. Designed as a training aid and motivational tool, the CompuTrainer system allowed users to interactively ride on their own bicycle through a virtual landscape generated on an NES or Commodore 64 by connecting their bike trainer unit directly to an external port on the game cartridge. Two trainer units could be connected at a time for 2 players to race virtually on screen while also displaying data such as speed, power, pedaling cadence, heart rate, and distance. As riders raced virtually, the cartridge sent a signal back to the CompuTrainer unit to dynamically change the bicycle's actual resistance based on what was happening on screen in real time with incline, wind, and drafting. The product had a price that was far too high to be considered as an entertainment product, but was affordable by dedicated athletes. RacerMate released the "Racermate Challenge I" cartridge on the Commodore 64 and the "Racermate Challenge II" cartridge on the NES. RacerMate made the CompuTrainer until 2017, where its latest version runs using Microsoft Windows compatible software with extensive graphic and physiological capabilities.

About the same time as the Computrainer, Concept II introduced a computer attachment for their rowing machine. This has become their eRow product and is used for both individual motivation as well as competition in "indoor rowing leagues".

=== 1990s ===
During the 1990s, there was a surge of interest in the application of virtual reality to high-end gym equipment. Life Fitness and Nintendo partnered to produce the Exertainment System; Precor had an LCD-based bike product, and Universal had several CRT-based systems. The Netpulse system provided users with the ability to browse the web while exercising. Fitlinxx introduced a system that used sensors attached to weight machines in order to provide automated feedback to users.

Three issues combined to ensure the failure of these systems in the marketplace. First, they were significantly more expensive than the equivalent models that did not have all the additional electronics. Second, they were harder to maintain, and were often left broken. Lastly the additional expertise required to operate the software was often intimidating to the users, who shied away from the machines out of fear that they would look foolish while trying to master the machine.

Until 1998, nothing significant happened in the field of videogame exercise. Hardware was still too expensive for the average home consumer, and the health clubs were gun-shy about adopting any new technology. As high-performance game console capabilities improved and prices fell, manufacturers once more started to explore the fitness market.

In 1998, Konami's Dance Dance Revolution was released. Pump It Up, a dance game similar to Konami's, was released in 1999 by the company Andamiro.

=== 2000s ===
In 2000, UK startup Exertris introduced an interactive gaming bike to the commercial fitness market.

Fitness games came to the mass media attention at the Consumer Electronics Show when Bill Gates showcased the Exertris Interactive Gaming Bike in 2003, and the following year the same show hosted a pavilion dedicated to video game technology that also worked as sports and exercise equipment.

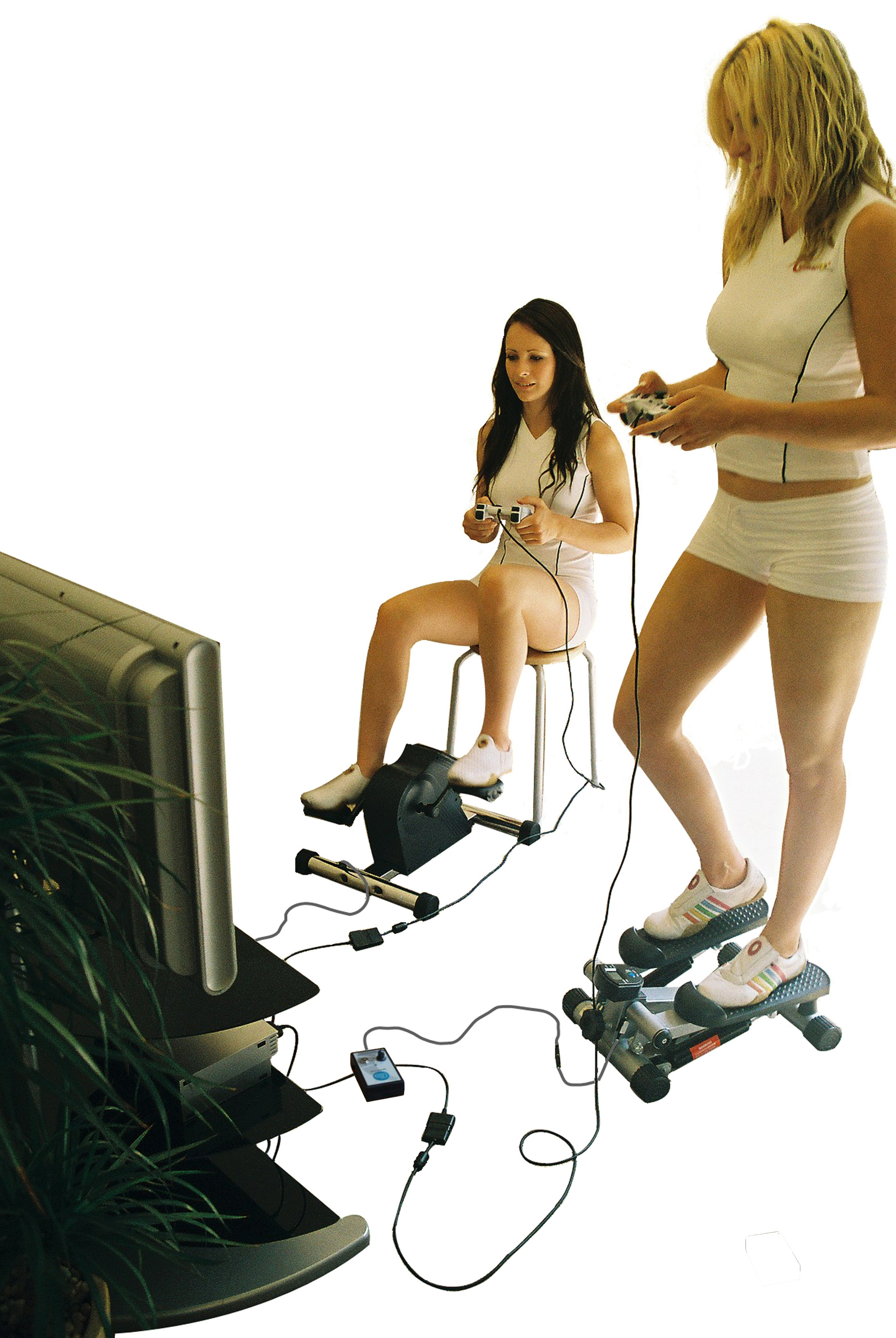
Gamercize played on PlayStation 2

The 2005 release of the EyeToy: Kinetic brought the first multi-function fitness game hardware into the home market. Making the players physical movements into the game's controller. 2006 saw the launch of Gamercize, combining traditional fitness equipment with game consoles. The minimalist approach allows game play to continue only when exercising, turning all game titles into potential fitness games.

Nintendo's Wii in 2006 brought acceleration detection with the Wii Remote. In late 2007, Nintendo released Wii Fit, which utilized a new peripheral, the Wii Balance Board. The popularity of the Wii led to it being used in hospital "Wiihab" rehabilitation programs.

The PCGamerBike appeared at CES in 2007 where it received an Honoree Award. It differs from other fitness game devices in that its pedal motion can be mapped to any key on the keyboard. It also has an optical encoder which detects forward and reverse pedal motion. The Fisher-Price Smart Cycle was another entry in the field.

Other examples of fitness game products include: Positive Gaming iDANCE, iSTEP, Cobalt Flux Blufit, Cyber coach, NeoRacer, Gymkids exercise equipment with interactive technology, some Wii titles such as EA Sports Active, Cybex TRAZER, Powergrid Fitness Kilowatt, Lightspace Play Floor, PlayMotion, Yourself!Fitness, Expresso Fitness S2, i.play, Cyber ExerCycle, VEQTOR Sport Trainer and Sportwall.

=== 2010s ===
Microsoft's Kinect (2010) was the first major consumer-focused body motion tracking hardware. Games such as Just Dance and Nike+ Kinect Training (2012) used Kinect to make physical body motion into a method of control for games. The trend within consoles that started with the Wii peaked with the pedometer-pairing Wii Fit U (2013). These were followed up in the eighth generation by a fitness game push by Microsoft with the Xbox One launch day Xbox Fitness service (2013), which tracked metrics such as heart rate and correct form while synchronising these metrics with the Microsoft Health. By 2017, Microsoft had pivoted away from Kinect and fitness games on consoles. Fitness Boxing was released on December 20, 2018, in Japan, December 21, 2018, in Europe and January 4, 2019, in North America. Ring Fit Adventure was released in North America on October 18, 2019. Both Nintendo Switch games take advantage of the Joy-Con controllers, acting as motion detectors in multiple areas of the body.

Mobile phone apps such as Zombies, Run! (2012), Run An Empire, Ingress (2013), and Pokémon Go (2016) have been described as augmented reality exergames.

Virtual reality (VR) is emerging as a new interface method for fitness games. Games like Beat Saber, Holodance, OhShape, and others allow players to get good exercise while playing a video game.

=== 2020s ===
Fitness games gained in popularity during the COVID-19 pandemic. Ring Fit Adventure (2019) sold-out at most retailers worldwide and saw a price increase from $80 to $300 on reselling websites. Nintendo also released Jump Rope Challenge (2020) for free and for a limited time in an effort to keep Nintendo Switch owners active while in quarantine. However, Nintendo later announced that the game would remain on the Nintendo eShop until further notice. As of September 30, 2020, players of the game had recorded 2.5 billion jumps in total.

The COVID-19 pandemic also caused delays in the industry. One reason Ring Fit Adventure (2019) did not have enough supply to meet demand was that China was hit early by the pandemic, leading to manufacturing shortages. The pandemic also delayed several VR products, such as the Valve Index, and titles such as Marvel's Iron Man VR and Little Witch Academia: VR Broom Racing.

Fitness games also proved to be especially helpful during the COVID-19 pandemic, as they were a great motivator for physical activity, which fought the sedentary lifestyle lockdowns caused. Physical fitness is known to aid in disease prognosis, as it boosts the immune system, shortened the recovery period from COVID-19, and reduced the negative effects of stress from living in isolation.

Overwhelmed medical centers also turned to therapeutic fitness games during the COVID-19 pandemic, as they proved to be more socially distant, required less direct supervision, and used less personal protective equipment. These games can be adjusted for each patients' exercise needs, making them suitable for the COVID-19 patients whose mobility became limited, or elderly patients, who were affected by COVID-19 at an increased rate.

== Effectiveness ==
Laboratory studies have demonstrated that some fitness games can provide light to moderate intensity physical activity.

Recreational fitness games can also be useful for rehabilitation. While they are not always as adjustable as therapeutic fitness games, recreational fitness games can still help maintain an adequate amount of physical activity, can help those without access to traditional rehabilitation, and can prolong the benefits of in-hospital rehabilitation. However, recreational fitness games might require more supervision, as they are less likely to exercise the correct muscles as therapeutic fitness games. Exercise games have also proven to be an effective supplement for rehabilitation programs during the COVID-19 pandemic, including balance rehabilitation for the elderly. Children are oftentimes more receptive to the idea of fitness games, making it an especially helpful tool in motivating ill children in their rehabilitation efforts.

As of 2016, fitness games for those with neurological disabilities had been studied in around 140 small clinical trials in people of all ages, to see if it can help this group get enough physical exercise to maintain their health. This mode of getting exercise appears attractive in this population from a public health perspective because of its low cost and accessibility. Fitness games have the potential to provide moderate intensity exercises in this population, but the evidence was too weak on long-term follow-up to draw strong conclusions.

There is significant evidence across multiple random controlled trials relating fitness games to improved cognitive functioning in healthy older adults (with a mean age of 69), and attenuated deterioration or improvement in adults with cognitive impairment from neurodegenerative diseases such as Alzheimer's disease.

In addition, studies investigated if fitness games can lead to improvements in cognitive performance in clinical and non-clinical populations such as those who have ADHD and depression. There are first encouraging results, but the empirical evidence still is limited.

Studies have shown that fitness games help manage anxiety in several ways. Fitness games help lower anxiety levels in various clinical populations such as patients with Parkinson's disease, enrolled in cardiac rehabilitation, with fibromyalgia, and with systemic lupus erythematosus by introducing more permanent positive physiological changes than methods that do not involve exercise do.

Fitness games are accessible to many disabled patients, as some have settings that allow the game to remember a person's range of motion, whether they have any assistive devices, and general physical ability.

=== Systematic reviews ===
A 2018 systematic review in the Journal of Medical Internet Research of 10 randomized trials studying the "Social Effects of Exergames on Older Adults" found that "the majority of exergame studies demonstrated promising results for enhanced social well-being, such as reduction of loneliness, increased social connection, and positive attitudes towards others".

Another 2018 systematic review of 10 randomised controlled trials of fitness games in overweight children found that they can produce a small reduction in body mass index.

A 2019 systematic review and meta-analysis found that fitness games are effective for improving muscle tension, muscle strength, activities of daily living (ADL), joint range of motion, gait, balance, and kinematics. The review also suggested that fitness games may be more effective at improving dynamic balance control and preventing falls in subacute and chronic stroke patients when compared to current treatment methods.

A 2020 systematic review found that fitness games can be utilized to augment treatment for a variety of patient populations such as geriatrics, and those with Parkinson's disease, cerebral palsy, and spinal cord injuries.

A 2021 systematic review found that exercise games could reduce BMI, and improve body fat percentage and cardiorespiratory fitness.

=== Safety ===
Fitness games have been shown to be safe and cost effective when used for stroke rehabilitation. Virtual environments allow patients to practice skills that would otherwise be unsafe in real world scenarios. A stroke patient with compromised balance, for example, could practice crossing the street in a simulated environment, something that would be risky and unsafe in real time. Fitness games can also make typical rehab exercises safer. Implementing virtual obstacles instead of physical obstacles in balance training exercises, for example, mitigates the risk of falls while increasing a patient's confidence.

== Design trends ==
When making a fitness game system, the manufacturer of a consumer product must make the decision as to whether the system will be usable with off-the-shelf games or if custom software must be written for it. Because it takes longer for a user to move their entire body in response to stimulation from the game, it is often the case that dedicated software must be written for the game to playable. An example of this is Konami's Dance Dance Revolution. Though designed to be played by users moving about on a specially designed dance pad, that game can alternatively be played by pushing buttons with one's fingers using a standard hand-held gamepad. When played with the dance pad at higher levels the game can be quite challenging (and physically exhausting), but if the game is played using the buttons on the hand controller, none of the sequences are physically limited.

Newer systems such as Xbox 360, PlayStation 3 and Wii use alternative input devices such as the Kinect and PlayStation Move. The Move uses inertial sensors in the wand to detect motion while the wand's position is tracked using a PlayStation Eye. A specifically designed exercise game Kinect, superimposes animated objects to be punched, kicked, or otherwise interacted with over a video image of the user. The Wii and PlayStation 3 both incorporate motion sensors such as accelerometers and gyroscopes into the hand-held controllers that are used to direct behaviors within the game.

Research projects such as exertion interfaces that investigate the design aspects of these games explore how the technological augmentation that comes with the digital gameplay component can be nurtured for additional benefits, such as utilizing the social power of exercising together even though players are connected only over a network or scaling the number of players, enabling novel exercise experiences not available without the technological augmentation.

One of the newest trends is using virtual reality immersion. VR systems have several potential advantages for athletic training; environments can be precisely controlled and scenarios standardized, augmented information can be incorporated to guide performance, and the environment can be dynamically altered to create different competitive situations. High frame rate display technologies, for example head-mounted display, can be used to transform the user into any sporting situation e.g. a track cycling velodrome. Natural movements can also be incorporated into the games, for example utilizing an omnidirectional treadmill, such as the Infinadeck. Such a system allows the user to virtually be in the game while allowing 360 degrees of movement. While the technology is new, it is showing promising results in weight management as well as in high participation rates.
