= Your Shape =

2009 video game

- North American box art, branded as Your Shape featuring Jenny McCarthy
- Developer(s): Ubisoft Barcelona
- Publisher(s): Ubisoft
- Platform(s): Wii, Microsoft Windows
- Release: NA: November 24, 2009
- Genre(s): Exergaming, Aerobics

Your Shape is an exercise video game developed by Ubisoft, released for PCs and the Wii in 2009. Utilizing a motion tracking camera released with the game, Your Shape guides the player through various aerobic exercises that can be tailored to target certain parts of the body. A sequel was released in 2010 titled Your Shape: Fitness Evolved for the Xbox 360.

== Development ==
Your Shape was developed as a companion to the Ubisoft Motion Tracking Camera. Ubisoft's design team in Barcelona began developing the camera in 2007 after they had seen a prototype of motion tracking technology developed by PrimeSense, a company who would later provide the motion sensing functionality for Microsoft's "Project Natal" (later released as Kinect) two years later in 2009. The development of the camera also led to the development of a fitness video game to go with the camera, which spawned Your Shape. Your Shape was the first Wii Game to support USB standards higher than 1.0 so the camera could work well. Support for USB 2.0 and higher was later added in a Wii System Update to every system.

The U.S. release of the game would feature an endorsement and appearances by model and comedian Jenny McCarthy, appearing as its in-game "workout buddy" to follow along with and motivate players while performing the exercise routines.

== Reception ==
Your Shape was released to mixed reviews by critics. Its motion tracking camera was met with positive reception for its ease of setup and accuracy; allowing Your Shape to not require any special accessories or controllers for use. However, reviewers also noted that a large play area was required to make the camera function with the game properly.

GameSpot's Brett Todd gave Your Shape a 5.0 out of 10. While its camera was noted as a positive aspect, Your Shape was panned for taking too much of a "no frills" and female-oriented approach in comparison to other games in its category (such as Wii Fit and EA Sports Active); including few customization options and no minigames, bland routines consisting of only straight aerobics with little variation. Todd also criticized the game for containing flattering and off-putting imagery, (such as the 3D image of the player's body used as a menu (compared to an airport scanner), and showing the feed from the camera on-screen during a routine) and concluded that "there isn't much in Your Shape that will get you off the couch."
