= Exertris =

Exercise gaming company

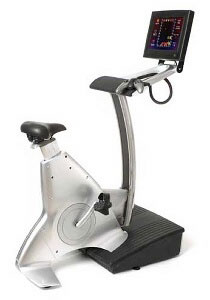
The Exertris Interactive Exercise Bike

Exertris was an exergaming company founded in 2000 by Gareth Davies. Their flagship product was the Exertris Interactive Exercise Bike, an exercise bike that uses several built in video games to motivate users.

== Overview ==
Davies, a Ph.D. physicist and a keen fitness enthusiast, invented the Exertris Interactive Exercise Bike to solve the motivation problem with respect to cardiovascular exercise. Observing that traditional exercise bikes simply discarded the energy input of the cyclist as waste heat and sound, he conceived of a system to put the cyclist's energy to use as well as giving direct feedback of their performance.

The Exertris system combined the addictive qualities of video games with the health benefits of exercise. Unlike previous attempts to 'virtualise' cycling, few of the games on the Exertris bike bore any resemblance to cycling. Instead, the cyclist's energy was virtualised and this virtual energy used to power elements of the games, all of which were designed specifically for the platform. The games also controlled the cycle's resistance in theme with the games.

The Exertris bike was one of the first Windows XP Embedded systems in the world. Bill Gates show-cased the Exertris bike at the Consumer Electronics Show 2003 during his keynote speech. The Exertris bike was also featured on BBC's Tomorrow's World in 2002 and televised on the show again the following year when Davies was nominated for the Tomorrow's World Innovation Awards.

== Features ==
The bike incorporated a gaming platform, an LCD screen, a gamepad and an arm-rest with a patented system that simultaneously raised the screen and arm-rest when the seat was raised ensuring correct posture in a single movement. The system was covered by two other patents: one for a motivational system to convert cycle speed into a virtual energy; a second covered the gearboxed resistance unit that dispensed with the need for a large, separate flywheel.

The bike also had a 'manual' mode which allowed it to operate as a standard exercise bike, complete with a simulated LED control panel.

== Games ==
The Exertris Bike originally shipped with four games:

- Solitaire - the player had to cycle in order to move the cards. Higher value cards represented higher resistance.
- Gems - a Columns-style puzzle game in which the players cycling slow the descent of falling gems. Matching gems of same colour exploded them, allowing players to clear levels in order to complete them. Different colour gems controlled resistance levels.
- Space Tripper - a scrolling shoot-em-up adapted and licensed from PomPom Games. In the ported version, the firepower of the ship was linked to the cyclist pedal speed. The player could also optionally charge the weapons system for increased firepower which also increase pedalling resistance.
- Orbit - a multiplayer video game in which players on linked bikes competed in an arena to collect gems scattered around levels for points.

In a later release of the bike's software two more games were added:

- Maze - a pacman-style game in which the user guides a cartoon ladybug around a mazed trying to avoid being eaten by hungry spiders.
- Light Cycles - a multiplayer game inspired by the famous scene in the 1982 film Tron.

== Demise ==
Although the Exertris Bike was received enthusiastically by consumers and press alike, economic factors at the time led to financial problems early on. The high manufacturing cost of the bike at low volumes combined with a poor funding environment following the dotcom bust and 9/11 meant the company never achieved profitable status and was forced to close in 2004.
