= Joyboard =

Atari 2600 balance board peripheral

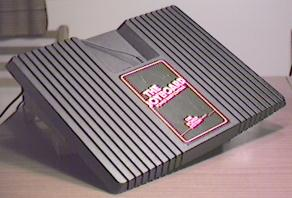
- Amiga Joyboard
- Manufacturer: Amiga Corporation
- Type: Game controller
- Generation: Second generation
- Released: August 1983
- Introductory price: $39 ($126 in 2026)

The Joyboard is a balance board controller for the Atari 2600. It was manufactured by the Amiga Corporation as a front for their development on a 16-bit home computer, eventually released as the Commodore Amiga. It released in August 1983 bundled with the slalom skiing video game, Mogul Maniac for the Atari 2600. Players lean in different directions on top of the Joyboard to simulate the regular output of an Atari joystick. It is also compatible with other platforms that use the Atari joystick port including the Atari 8-bit computers and Commodore VIC-20. A version for the ColecoVision was also released. It was a commercial failure, in part due to the ongoing video game crash of 1983.

Three other games were designed for the Joyboard, Off Your Rocker, Surf's Up, and S.A.C. Alert. Two of which were developed by Video Soft. None of them were released by Amiga, though Off Your Rocker and S.A.C. Alert were eventually sold by collectors. The Joyboard was promoted by Olympic skier Suzy Chaffee. At the Amiga offices, the Joyboard became part of a company ritual where employees would attempt to calm themselves by balancing perfectly on top of the controller. This inspired the Guru Meditation error message that appeared in early versions of the AmigaOS operating system.

Critics generally praised the novelty of the Joyboard as a control device and thought it worked well in games that were designed for it, but it was generally seen as a poor substitute for a joystick in most situations. Electronic Games editor Tracie Forman incorporated it as part of her workout routine, along with The Activision Decathlon. It was also criticized for not working well on carpets and other soft surfaces, necessitating the use of makeshift hard surfaces such as game boards. Critics consider Mogul Maniac to have simplistic graphics but enjoyable gameplay especially when using the accompanying Joyboard.

== Design ==
The Joyboard is a 14" x 12" black platform (about the size of a bathroom scale) designed to hold 250 pounds of weight. On its underside is a disc which allows the board to tilt in various directions. The player activates the four directions of the standard joystick by leaning in the correct direction on top of the board. However, if the player leans to far the disc lifts off the floor, resulting in no input. Players must learn to manipulate their weight to lean just the right amount for best performance. An Atari joystick port in the center of the board allows players to access the action button, allowing full compatibility with any game that uses an Atari joystick. It does not work very well on surfaces that are not hard and flat, such as carpets or rugs. It is also compatible with other platforms that use the Atari joystick port, including the Atari 8-bit computers and the Commodore VIC-20.

Ian Bogost considered the Joyboard to be a precursor of the Wii Balance Board, a peripheral released in 2007 for the Nintendo Wii, although with much less sophisticated technology.

== Release ==
The Amiga Corporation was formed to develop a 16-bit home computer code-named Lorraine, which would eventually release as the Commodore Amiga. In order to raise money and hide production on Lorraine, the company decided to develop peripherals for the Atari 2600. Amiga debuted the Joyboard in early 1983. It was announced along with a number of other peripherals, including a standard joystick design called the Power-Stick, and a RAM expansion module that included an audio cassette adapter (similar to the Starpath Supercharger) called the Power Module. The later of which never released. In August 1983, Amiga released it for the Atari 2600 bundled with Mogul Maniac. It had a launch price of $39.95. On August 22, Amiga released a version compatible with the ColecoVision. The peripheral did not have much commercial success due to the video game crash of 1983.

Olympic skier Suzy Chaffee was hired to promote Mogul Maniac and the Joyboard. She appeared on morning news programs and toy fairs to demonstrate the board in full ski gear. According to Amiga developer RJ Mical, Chaffee left a trophy of hers "that looked like a hood ornament from a 50's car on acid" at the Amiga offices which she never retrieved.

== Software ==
=== Mogul Maniac ===
Mogul Maniac, featuring slalom gates emerging from the horizon.

Mogul Maniac is a first-person slalom skiing video game for the Atari 2600. It was included as a pack-in title with the Joyboard, and is the only game Amiga released to support the peripheral. Players control a skier from a first-person perspective while racing downhill through pairs of poles which create closed gates and zigzagging around single poles which act as open gates. If the player goes too far off course they will encounter trees as hazards. A clock keeps track of the players time, and alternates colors to match the current gate the player must ski through. There are a total of nine courses which vary in maximum speed and the placement of poles. Two runs of a single course make up a complete game with the sum of the two runs making up the players final time. The player can use either the Joyboard or a regular joystick. The black-and-white/color control switch on the Atari 2600 mirrors the controls vertically, allowing the player to turn left by leaning right and vice versa which is meant to simulate how actual skiers turn better.

=== Other games ===
Amiga planned three more Atari 2600 games to support the Joyboard. One was Off Your Rocker, a puzzle game similar to the electronic game Simon. Other games included a first-person surfing game titled Surf's Up and a shooting game titled S.A.C. Alert. Off Your Rocker and S.A.C. Alert were developed by Video Soft, a game company founded by Fairchild Channel F project lead Jerry Lawson. All of them were cancelled before release. Off Your Rocker was complete enough to receive a limited print run of 630 copies, which were eventually discovered and bought by an Ohio-based company called Pleasant Valley Video, who created labeling and instructions for them and sold them in the early 90s. S.A.C. Alert was also sold in limited quantities by collectors in 2010, with permission form Jerry Lawson.

== Guru Meditation ==
Early in the development of the Amiga computer operating system, the company's developers became so frustrated with the system's frequent crashes that, as a relaxation technique, they attempted to sit perfectly still on the Joyboard so not to engage any of the latches on the bottom of it. This inspired the Guru Meditation error message found in early version of the AmigaOS operating system.

In homage to this, Ian Bogost, founder of video game developer Persuasive Games, has developed the video game Guru Meditation in an attempt "to create a legitimate zen meditation game". Although the game may be played using a joystick, if a player uses the Joyboard, they must sit perfectly still on it with their legs crossed. If a player is successful, the on-screen yogi will rise, and once enough time has passed the yogi will begin to float and the timer starts. The time of day changes roughly each hour, and clouds pass in the background. Ian Bogost worked in conjunction with Atari fansite AtariAge to manufacture ten copies of the game in cartridge form.

== Reception ==
Dan Persons at Video Games magazine called the Joyboard "a uniquely physical experience" once he got over the fear the device would "pitch [him] through the TV screen." He didn't consider it to be serious replacement for standard joysticks but did consider it to work well with games like Mogul Maniac which "simulate the physics of movement." Tracie Forman of Electronic Games thought the only drawback was that it was only designed to work well on hard, flat surfaces so players with carpeted gaming spaces would need to use an improvised intermediate such as a game board or a collection of books. Forman thought it made for a perfect pairing with The Activision Decathlon, a pairing she claimed had become part of her regular exercise routine. Mike Wilson of the The Logical Gamer though the Joyboard wasn't worth the money for Mogul Maniac alone and wasn't worth using with other games. Wilson's co-reviewer Alan R. Bechtold called it "an interesting new device that no one needs" though he also thought it worked well with The Activision Decathlon.

Video Games magazine called Mogul Maniac "simple in design" and dominated by "featureless white", but thought it had a good 3D effect and sound effects. They thought it was "a little too easy" when played with a joystick but required "subtle manipulation of weight" when using the Joyboard. The Video Game Update said it had "sparse and simple" graphics but found it to be a "fun-filled, involving game to play." They thought it was more fun when played with a Joyboard which they thought added "a whole new dimension to video game enjoyment." Electronic Games thought Mogul Maniac was the perfect choice for showing off the strengths of the Joyboard. Mike Wilson thought the only thing Mogul Maniac provided was "a game you can play with your feet," although Alan R. Bechtold was more favorable, complimenting the challenge and variety of courses. Electronic Fun with Computers and Games called it "a pretty awful game" with poor graphics and unrealistic physics. JoyStik magazine called the graphics "bare minimum", Brett Weiss in 2007 thought they were "simple, but effective." German magazine TeleMatch thought it was a blast that blurs the line between game and reality due to its physicality.
