= EA Sports Active =

2009 video game

- North American box art
- Developer: EA Canada
- Publisher: EA Sports
- Platform: Wii
- Release: NA: May 19, 2009; EU: May 22, 2009; JP: August 6, 2009
- Genre: Fitness game
- Modes: Single-player, multiplayer

EA Sports Active: Personal Trainer is a video game developed by EA Canada for the Wii console. It was released on May 19, 2009 in North America. The game ships with a strappable pouch to hold the Nunchuk and a resistance band.

The game is the first in a line of EA Sports Active branded games and related peripherals. An expansion, EA Sports Active: More Workouts, was released on November 17, 2009.

A follow-up, EA Sports Active 2, released in November 2010. An NFL-themed version, EA Sports Active NFL Training Camp, was released on the same day.

== Gameplay ==
EA Sports Active is an exercise game consisting of activities that use the motion controls of the Wii platform. Primarily played using the Wii Remote, the game package includes a pouch that allows the player to strap the attached Nunchuk to their legs in order to track their lower body movements. The Wii Balance Board is also supported but is not required for play.

The game features a number of exercise options supervised by a virtual personal trainer, including 20 minute workout regimens and a 30 Day Challenge mode that lets players set workout goals, such as calories burned or a number of sessions while tracking their progress over time. The idea is that the weight loss will happen on its own if the calories burned goals in each workout are met or exceeded.

The game also awards trophies for reaching specific fitness landmarks, such as accumulating ten total workout hours, working out with a friend, and completing all the exercises in the 30 Day Challenge.

Players are also encouraged to create a custom workout session built around either personal favorite exercises, calorie goals (such as burning 100+ calories in one session), or targeting specific body areas. To help aid in creating a balanced workout, a percentage chart displays how much of the routine is devoted to either upper body, lower body, or cardio development. The intensity of the workout can be altered by changing the difficulty levels of either a single exercise or the entire routine.

== Development ==
EA Sports' Peter Moore claims that EA Sports Active was developed to focus more on a higher-impact "Western" philosophy of exercise focused mainly on weight loss, compared to a lower-impact, stretching and balance based "Eastern" approach, as taken by Nintendo's Wii Fit. EA also saw a strong business opportunity in creating a game for people who need to work out yet do not have the time or are not comfortable doing so in public.

Celebrity personal trainer Bob Greene was involved with developing the game.

== Reception ==
Reception

Aggregate scores
Aggregator	Score
GameRankings	81%
Metacritic	81

Review scores
Publication	Score
1Up.com	B+
GameSpot	8.0/10
IGN	7.8/10

EA Sports Active has received generally positive reviews from video game critics and the mainstream media.

One of the biggest critiques on EA's community message boards about the game was the lack of real resistance offered by the supplied elastic band. Many found that folding the band over itself as suggested by the game's tutorial to be ineffective in increasing the resistance level. However, the supplied grips for the elastic band can be used with other elastic bands, specifically those used in pilates, in order to increase the intensity of all upper body exercises.

EA claims that EA Sports Active has sold over 600,000 units worldwide between May 19, 2009 and June 1, 2009, and 1.8 million units in its quarter. It is EA's best selling Wii title.

The lack of an option to switch to left-handed has caused discontent for some left-handed users who have purchased the game as this is not advertised on the outer packaging.

== More workouts ==
After the success the game received, EA Sports released an expansion pack on 17 November 2009, titled EA Sports Active: More Workouts, which, as the name suggests, added several new workouts to the existing program.
