= Amiga Corporation =

Computer company in United States

- The first logo

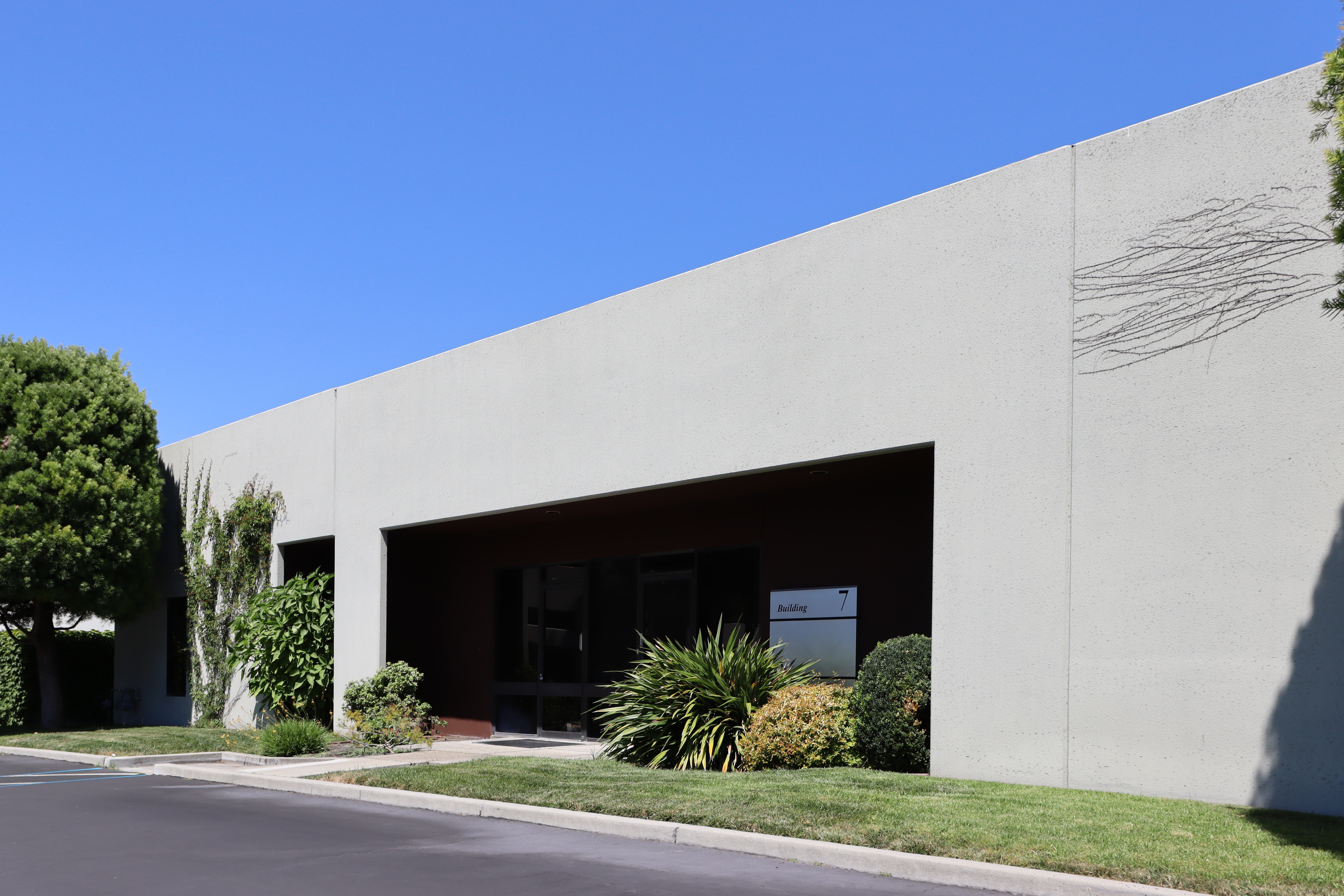
- Amiga's first headquarters in Santa Clara
- Industry: Computer
- Founded: September 1982 (as Hi-Toro)
- Defunct: August 1984
- Fate: Became a subsidiary of Commodore International
- Successor: Commodore-Amiga, Inc.
- Headquarters: Santa Clara, California, United States
- Key people: Jay Miner (founder)
- Products: Amiga
- Website: amiga.com

The 1985 logo

Amiga Corporation was a United States computer company formed in the early 1980s as Hi-Toro. It is most famous for having developed the Amiga computer, code named Lorraine.

== History ==
=== 1982 ===
In the early 1980s Jay Miner, along with other Atari staffers, became fed up with management and left the company.

In September 1982, they set up another chipset project under a new company in Santa Clara, California, called Hi-Toro (meaning "high bull"), later renamed to Amiga, where they could have some creative freedom. The new company's first headquarters was located in Building 7 in a business park at 3350 Scott Boulevard in Santa Clara. They started to create a new 68000-based games console, codenamed Lorraine, that could be upgraded to a full-fledged computer. The initial start-up financing of Amiga Corporation was provided by three dentists in Florida, who later regained their investment once Commodore bought the company.

To raise money for the Lorraine project, Amiga designed and sold joysticks and game cartridges for popular game consoles such as the Atari 2600 and ColecoVision, as well as an input device called the Joyboard, essentially a joystick the player stood on.

=== 1983 ===
During development in 1983, Amiga had exhausted venture capital and was desperate for more financing. Jay Miner approached his former employer, Atari, which then paid Amiga to continue development work. In return Atari was to obtain one-year exclusive use of the design. Atari had plans for a 68000-based machine, code-named "Mickey", that would have used customized chips, but details were sparse.

During this period a downturn started in the video game business that turned into the Video game crash of 1983. By the end of the year, Atari was losing about $1 million a day, and its owner, Warner Communications, sought to sell the company. For some time, no one was interested.

=== 1984 ===
Meanwhile, at Commodore International, a fight was brewing between Jack Tramiel, the president, and Irving Gould, the primary shareholder. Tramiel was pressing the development of a 32-bit machine to replace its earlier Commodore 64 and derived machines, fearing a new generation of machines like the Apple Macintosh would render the 64 completely obsolete. The fighting continued until Tramiel was dismissed on January 13, 1984.

Tramiel formed a holding company, Tramel Technology, Ltd., (a phonetic spelling of "Tramiel") and visited various US computer companies with the intention of purchasing a company for manufacturing and possible technology acquisitions. Tramiel visited Mindset (run by Roger Badersher, former head of Atari's Computer Division), and Amiga. Amiga's talks eventually fell through as Tramiel told Amiga staff that he was very interested in the chipset, but not the staff. In the meantime, he had set his chief engineer (former Commodore engineer Shiraz Shivji) the task of developing a new low-cost, high-end computer system.

Tramiel's design for his next generation computer was 95% completed by June (which only fueled speculation that Shivji and other engineers had taken technology with them from Commodore). Tramiel discovered that Warner Communications wanted to sell Atari, which at that point was losing about $10,000 a day. Interested in Atari's overseas manufacturing and worldwide distribution network for his new computer, he approached Atari and entered talks. After on again/off again negotiations with Atari in May and June 1984, Tramiel had secured his funding and bought Atari's Consumer Division (which included the console and home computer departments) that July; Tramel Technology, Ltd. became Atari Corporation. Commodore filed an injunction against Tramiel and Atari, seeking to bar them from releasing their new computer.

One of Tramiel's first acts after forming Atari Corp. was to fire most of Atari's remaining staff and stop almost all ongoing projects in order to review their continued viability. It was during this time in late July that Tramiel's representatives discovered the original Atari Inc./Amiga contract.

BYTE had reported in April 1984 that Amiga "is developing a 68000-based home computer with a custom graphics processor. With 128K bytes of RAM and a floppy-disk drive, the computer will reportedly sell for less than $1000 late this year". It turned out that Amiga was supposed to deliver the Amiga chipset to Atari Inc. on June 30, 1984, or forfeit the company and its technology. With the deadline fast approaching and still not having enough funds to finish development, the Amiga crew went on alert after having heard rumors that Tramiel was in closed negotiations to complete the purchase of Atari in several days. Remembering Tramiel's visit that Spring during its investor campaign, it began scrambling for another large investor. So, at around the same time that Tramiel was in negotiations with Atari, Amiga wound up entering into discussions with Commodore. The discussions ultimately led to Commodore wanting to purchase Amiga outright, which would (from Commodore's viewpoint) cancel any outstanding contracts — including the contract given to the now defunct Atari Inc. So instead of Amiga delivering the chipset to Atari, Commodore delivered a check of $500,000 to Atari Corp. on Amiga's behalf (right about the time it was discovering the contract), in effect returning the funds invested into Amiga for completion of the Lorraine chipset.

=== Acquisition by Commodore August 1984 ===
Seeing a chance to gain some leverage, Tramiel immediately used the situation to countersue Commodore through its new (pending) subsidiary, Amiga, which was done on August 13, 1984. He sought damages and an injunction to bar Amiga (and effectively Commodore) from producing anything with that technology. The suit tried to render Commodore's new acquisition (and the source for its next generation of computers) useless and do to Commodore what they were trying to do to him.

Meanwhile, at Commodore, the Amiga team (according to conversations by Curt Vendel of Atarimuseum.com directly with Dave Needle of Amiga and also with Joe Decuir of Amiga) was sitting in limbo for nearly the entire summer because of the lawsuit. No word on the status of the chipset, the Lorraine computer system or the team's fate was known. Finally in the fall of 1984 Commodore informed the team that the Lorraine project was active again, the chipset to be improved, the OS developed and the hardware design completed.

From this point on the former Amiga Corporation was a division of Commodore. Over the next few years many employees felt Commodore's management proved to be as annoying as Atari's, and most of the team members left, were laid off, or were fired. Meanwhile, Atari used this time to finish and release the Atari ST computer just months ahead of the release of the Amiga.

Both lawsuits themselves were laid to rest in March 1987, when Commodore and Atari Corp. settled out of court in a closed decision.

== See also ==
- Amiga, Inc.
- Commodore
