= NeoRacer =

Video game console accessory

The NeoRacer is a portable magnetic fitness bike that interacts with video games on several platforms. This includes the Xbox, GameCube, PlayStation, PlayStation 2 and the PC.

== Description ==
The pedal motion controls speed in the game. It comes with a DualShock controller for all of the other functions. The pedal motion can be assigned to any button on the DualShock controller. The NeoRacer works best with driving and racing games.

== Developer ==
NeoRacer was developed by Deep Ridge Ltd. They also hold copyright and licensing of NeoRacer. The company is located in the United Kingdom.
