= EA Sports Active 2 =

2010 video game

- North American Wii box art
- Developer(s): EA Canada
- Publisher(s): EA Sports
- Platform(s): PlayStation 3; Xbox 360; Wii
- Release: NA: November 16, 2010; AU: November 18, 2010; EU: November 19, 2010
- Genre(s): Fitness game

EA Sports Active 2: Personal Trainer is an exercise video game developed by EA Canada. It was released on November 16, 2010, in North America for the Xbox 360, PlayStation 3 and Wii. The Xbox 360 version makes use of Kinect. It is the successor to EA Sports Active, which was released in 2009. On April 13, 2012, EA discontinued the online support for this title.
