= PCGamerBike =

Exercise bike that can interact with computer games

The PCGamerBike is an exercise bike that can interact with computer games. It uses magnets to produce resistance which makes the bike relatively quiet in operation, and comes with software that will automatically logs calories burned, distance and speed to a daily graph.

== Types ==
There are two versions of the PCGamerBike; the PCGamerBike Mini and the PCGamerBike Recumbent. The PCGamerBike Mini is a compact exercise bike, and the PCGamerBike Recumbent is a full-sized recumbent exercise bike.

== Use ==
The PCGamerBike is configurable and, as a result, can interact with a broad range of PC games. They are typically used to control character(s) in a game, or a character's vehicle, such as a car, bike or boat, by pedaling forward or backward, to move the character in those directions. Side to side controls require the use of a keyboard or mouse, which can be used in accompaniment with the bike. When used with driving and racing games, character speed is proportional to pedal speed. The PCGamerBike Mini can be used with any game that supports a keyboard, as it is connected via a USB port as a game controller. The resistance of the pedals on the PCGamerBike Recumbent can be adjusted to the player's preference and will also vary depending on certain in-game situations, for example, in a situation when the character is going up or down hill.

== Awards ==
The PCGamerBike received the 2007 International CES Innovations Design and Engineering Award.
