= I.play =

i.play, also known as the Intelligent Play System is an interactive playground designed in collaboration between Progressive Sports Technologies Ltd and Playdale Playgrounds.

The i.play has switches and lights which light up and make sounds, requiring participants to push them to earn points.

The development and evaluation of the i.play system is being conducted by Phil Hodgkins as part of a Ph.D. in sports technology at Loughborough University.

The world's first i.play system was opened to the public at Barrow Park, Barrow-in-Furness, UK on 20 July 2007.

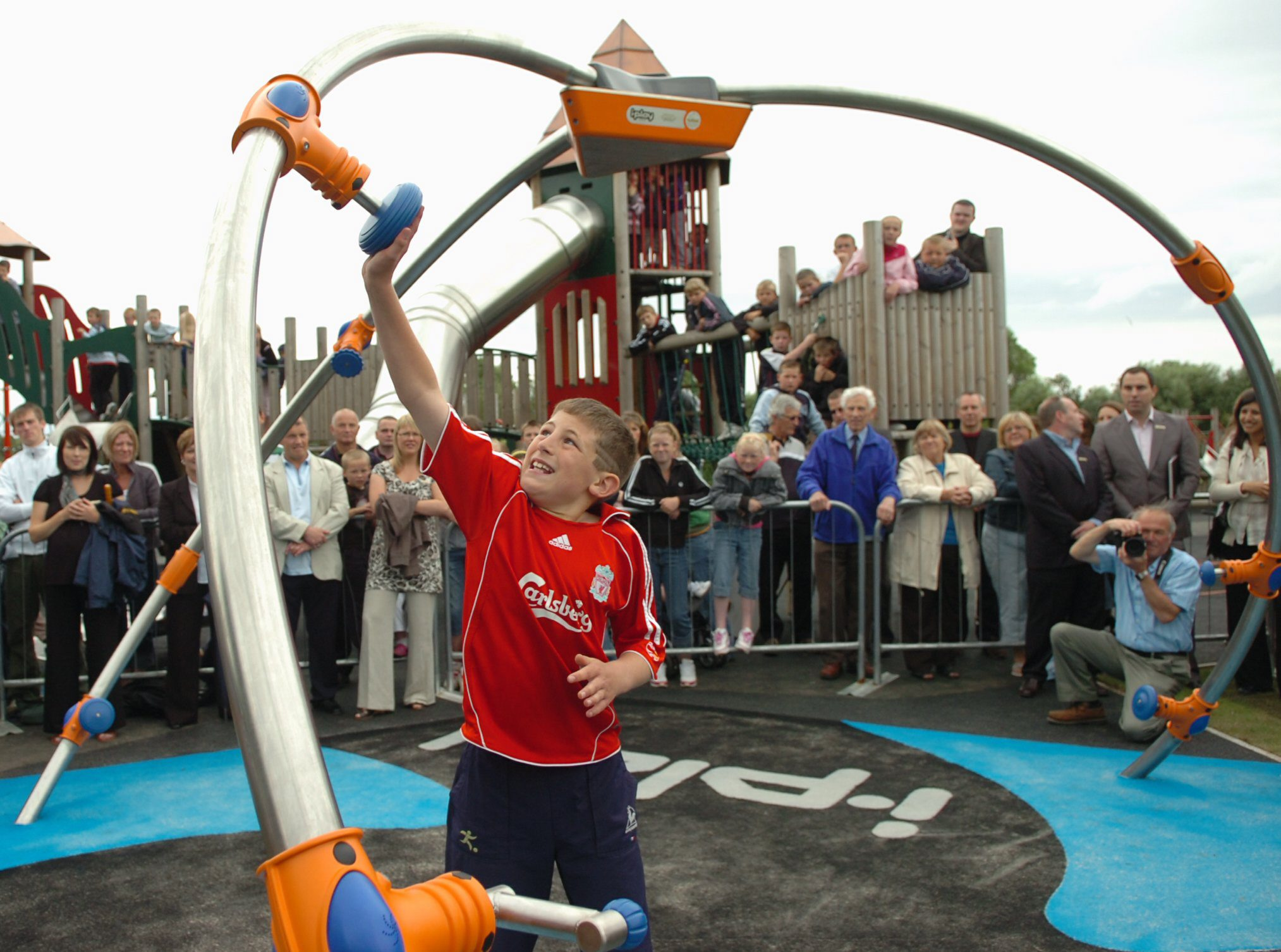
i.play tournament, Barrow Park July 2007

Children celebrate the launch of i.play at Barrow Park, July 2007
