= Holodance =

2016 video game

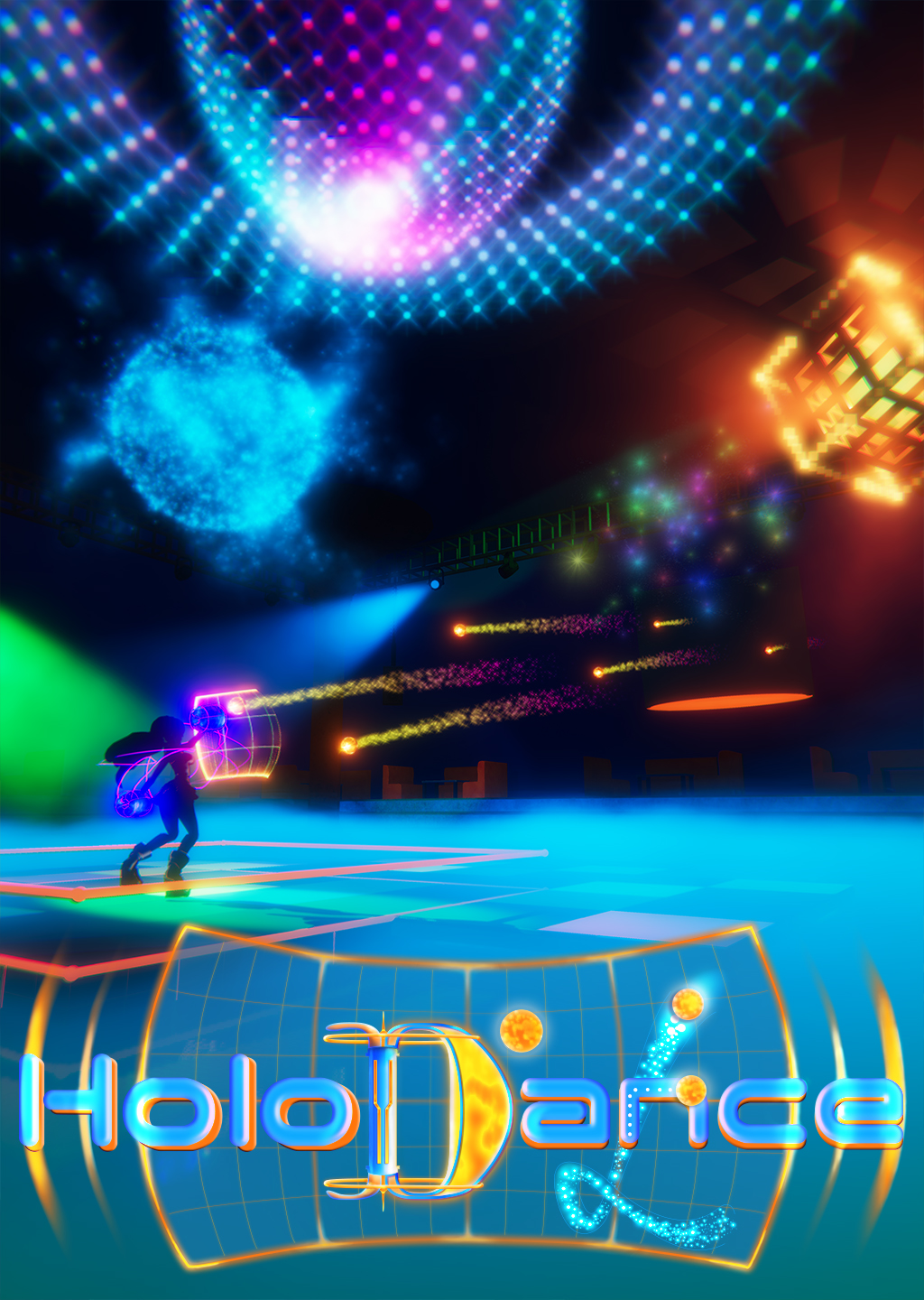
- Developer: Narayana games
- Publisher: Narayana games
- Platforms: HTC Vive, Oculus Rift
- Release: April 5, 2016
- Genre: Music / rhythm
- Mode: Single-player

Holodance is a collaborative multiplayer virtual reality rhythm video game developed and published by Narayana games for Microsoft Windows. The standard version of the game features 12 songs where people can dance to. The game has been available as an Early access title on Steam since April 5, 2016.

== Gameplay ==
Players interact with the rhythm of a song using their hands, which are tracked using motion controllers.

=== Catching Orbs ===
A mechanism used for percussion instruments, Catching Orbs puts attention on the timing of catching an orb. For each note of the instrument track currently played, one orb flies towards the player from a greater distance and arrives in hands' reach in front of the player at the exact moment that the note starts playing in the song. This location is marked by the outline of a sphere that glows up and down so that players know when they have to catch the note with their hand, and where. If players catch the note, they receive a score depending on how precisely they matched the rhythm, plus a bonus based on how fast they moved their hand before catching the note, and another bonus based on the rotation speed of their hand before catching the note. The locations where the orbs arrive can be used to create a dance choreography for the player. However, this mechanic only defines where the players have to have their hands at certain times. How the player gets there is up to the player, so it can be dancing, but it can also just be hitting orbs, allowing the players to find their way of expressing themselves in the game. When the player misses a note, that specific instrument is muted until they catch the next. This mechanic that has since been used by many other Virtual Reality rhythm games was inspired by a game jam project called E-Motion and first made public by Holodance in July 2015.

=== Following Splines ===
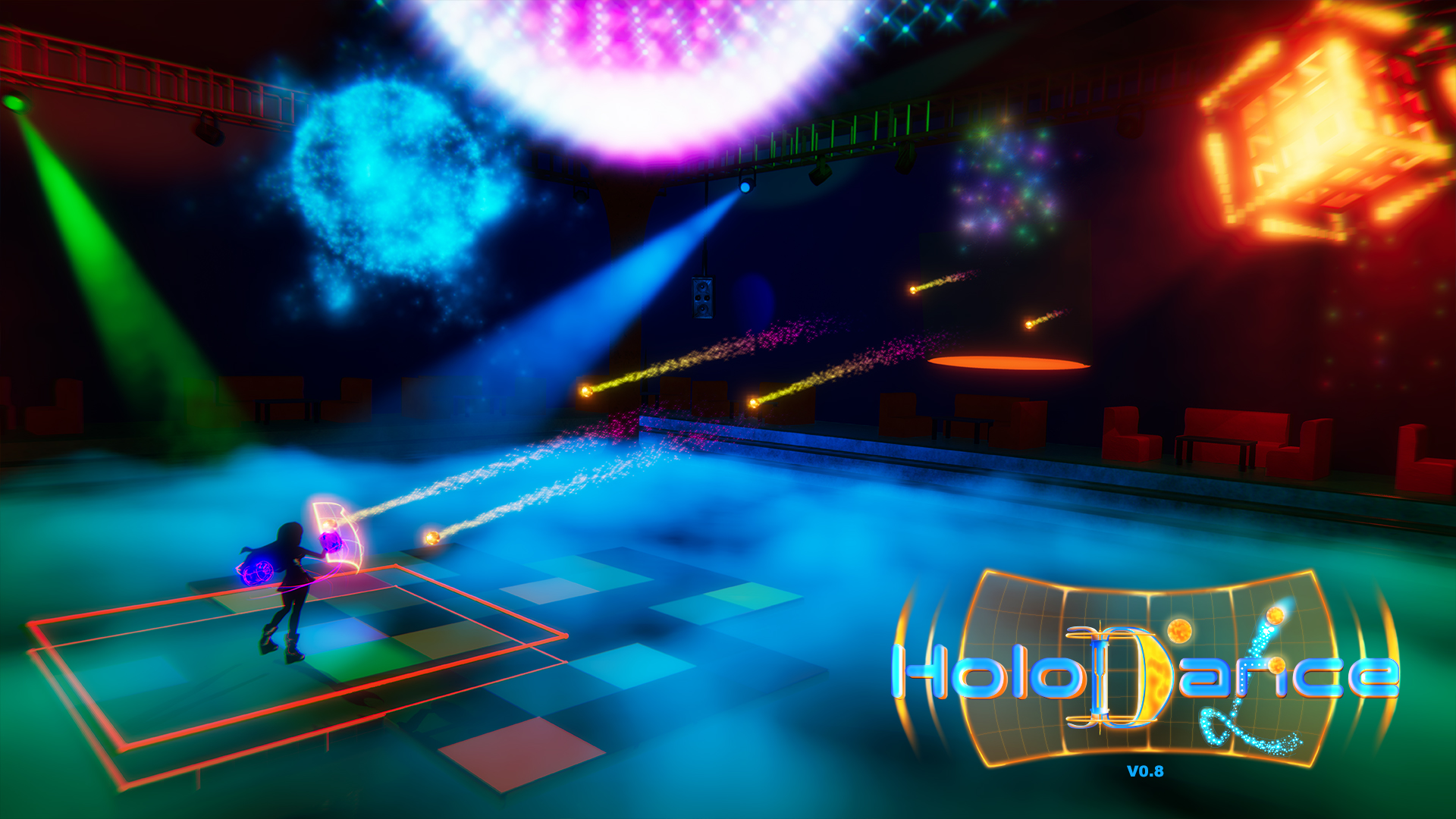
Key screenshot of Holodance V0.8, in the environment "Virtual Clubbing", with gameplay (anime girl catching orbs).

Following Splines is a mechanic introduced in Level 4 of the story mode of Holodance. It is used for sustained instruments. The way this mechanic works is similar to catching orbs in the initial phase until a note starts: The floating spline flies towards the player from a distance and arrives near the player when the note starts. Once the note has started and is sustained, the player now has to keep following an orb that keeps moving along the spline path, which is synchronized with the duration of the given note. That path starts when the note starts, and it ends when the note ends. The full spline path is visualized from the beginning, so the player knows where to move and by an orb following that path with the correct speed, the player also knows at what pace to move. This way, any hand movement could be choreographed. The score that players receive is calculated using how much of the time of the note their hand was actually inside the sphere while it moved along the path. This mechanic was first revealed in August 2015.

=== Spinning Spinners ===
Spinning Spinners is a mechanic inspired by osu! Spinners and implemented so that all mechanics of osu! Beat maps are also supported in Holodance. The main difference is that instead of moving their mouse, players need to spin the controller.

=== Combo Multipliers ===
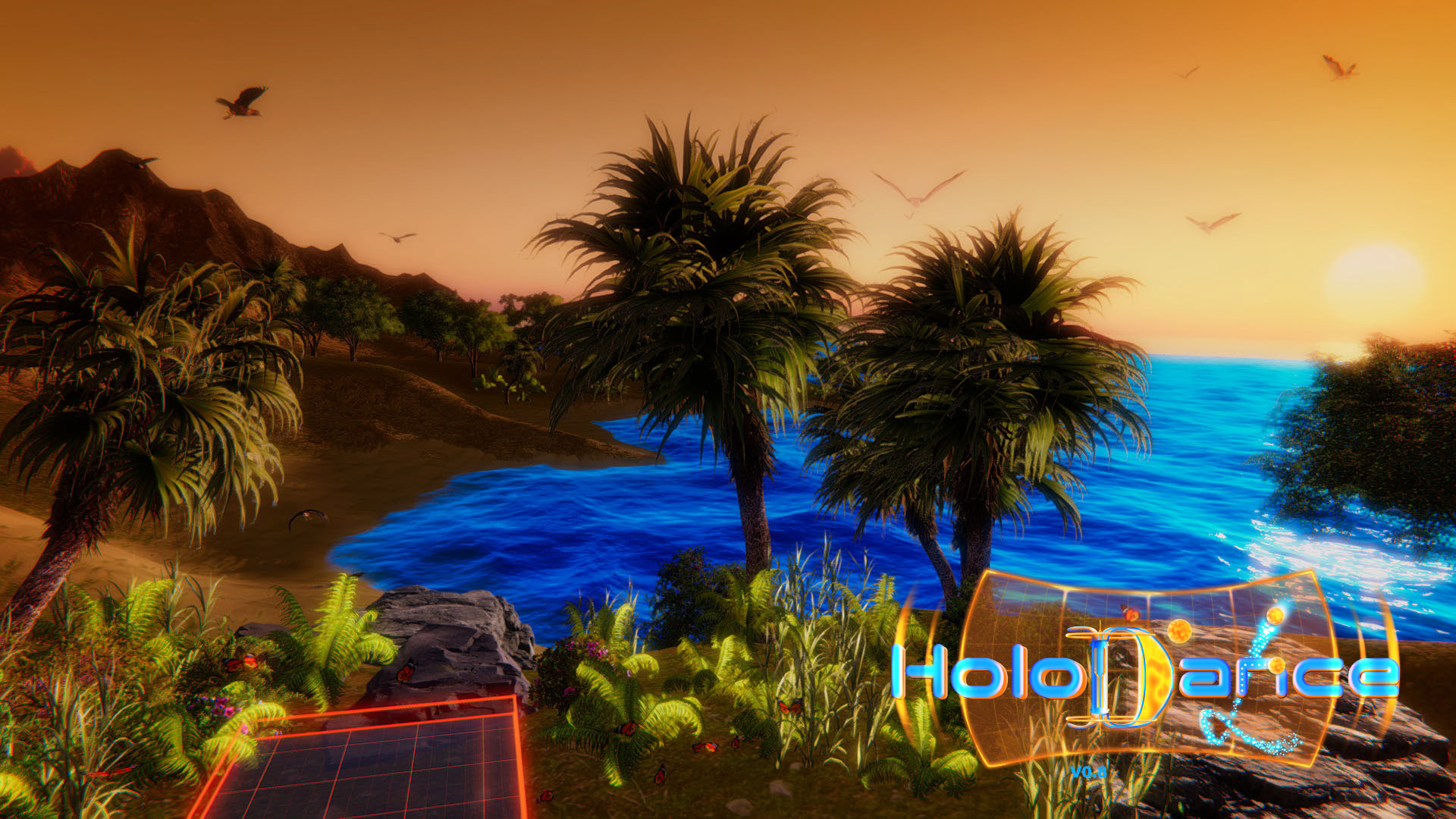
Official Holodance V0.8 screenshot of the beach level (Level 01 in story mode).

When players catch multiple notes without missing one, they receive combo multipliers. After eight notes, the score of each successive note is multiplied by two. After sixteen notes, the multiplier is increased to three. Finally, after 48 notes without missing a single one, players receive the 4x multiplier. The game also has events after not missing a single note and catching 30% and 80% of the notes. How these effects are visualized is depending on the selected environment, and not all environments support these events. Finally, a full combo, which means not missing a single note of the complete song triggers both an event and an achievement called No Note Missed.

== Story and Environments ==
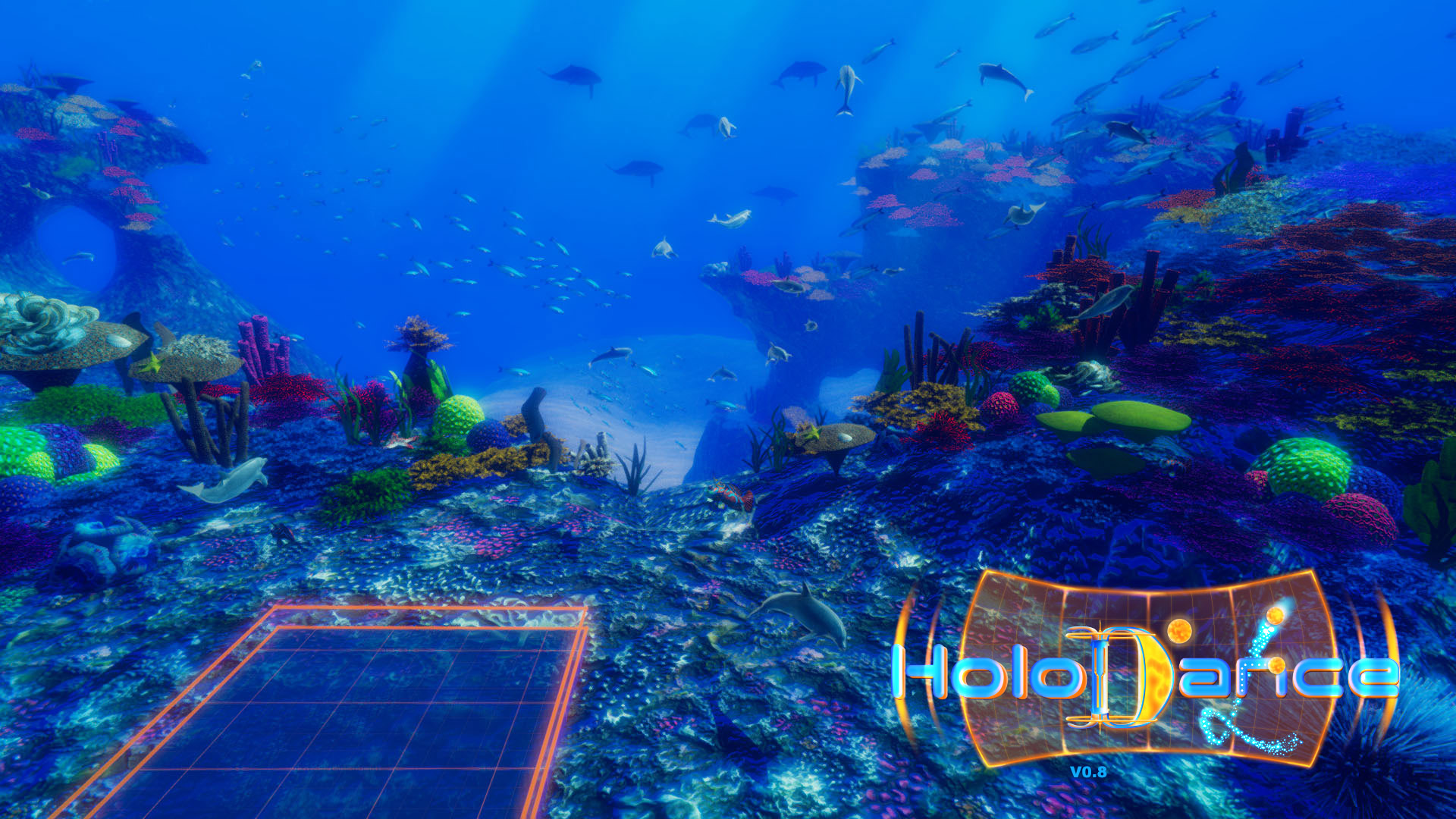
Official Holodance V0.8 screenshot of the first water level (Level 03 in story mode).

In Holodance's story mode, players experience land, air, and underwater environments in undergoing various levels of environmental pollution. In the first three levels, the environment has not been touched by human influence. Levels four, five and six illustrate mild pollution and the next three levels show the severe impact of the influence of an industrialized human civilization. Other virtual reality projects use a similar approach (see).

== Reception ==
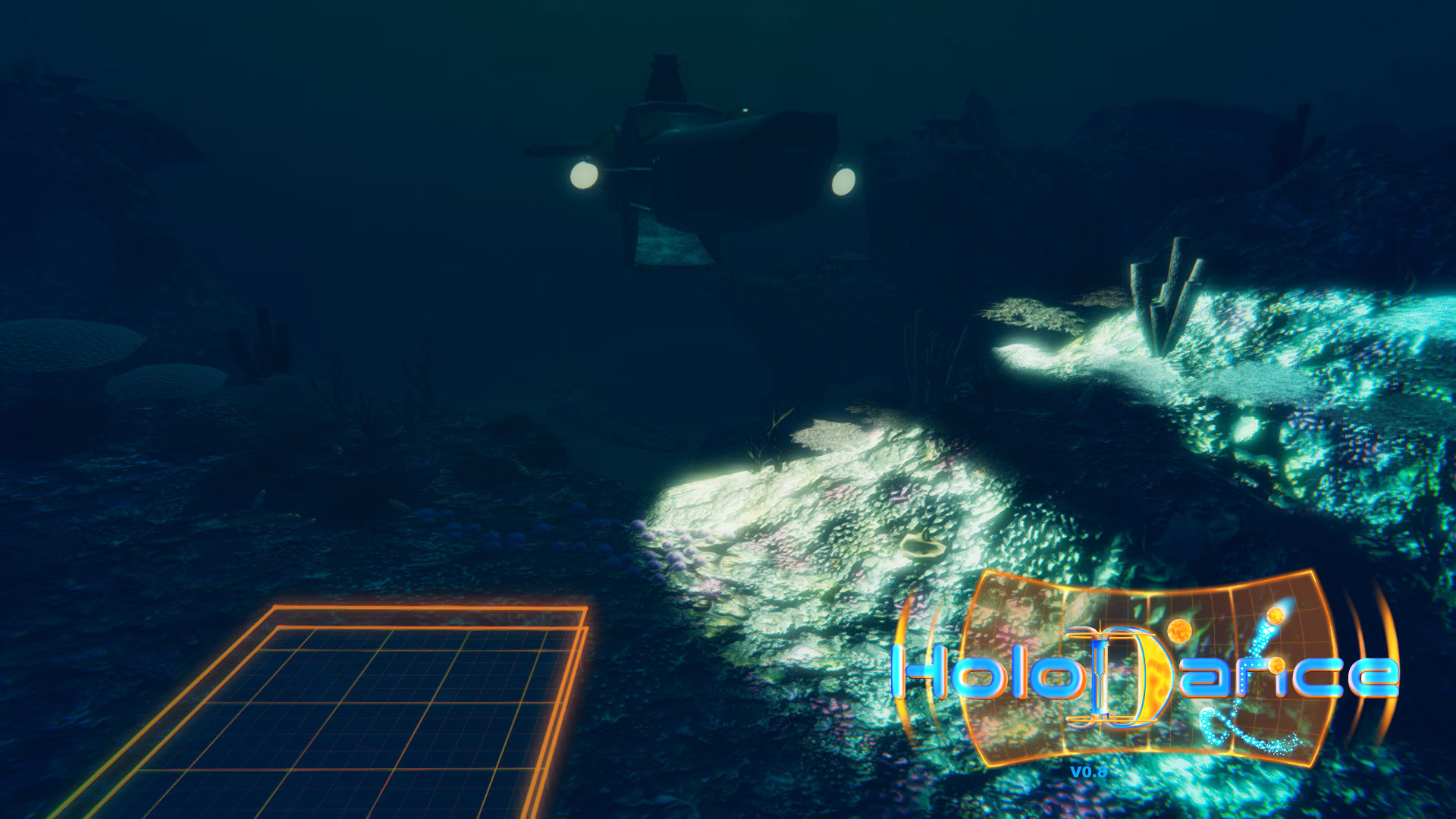
Official Holodance V0.8 screenshot of the last water level (Level 07 in story mode).

Upon release Holodance received a very positive reception, with an 85% positive rating on steam and multiple critic reviews praising the game:

UploadVR wrote after testing an early pre-alpha build that “the game was pretty darn fun ... both for me and those watching.”

“With plenty of music variety, your workout is only limited by your music choice. For those who like to dance or like the challenge of sliding and spinning notes this game can become addicting quickly.”

8.5/10 – VR Fitness Insider
