= UFC Personal Trainer =

2011 video game

UFC Personal Trainer: The Ultimate Fitness System
- Developer: Heavy Iron Studios
- Publisher: THQ
- Platforms: PlayStation 3, Xbox 360, Wii
- Release: PlayStation 3 & Xbox 360: NA: June 28, 2011; EU: July 1, 2011; AU: July 7, 2011; Wii: NA: July 12, 2011; AU: July 13, 2011; EU: July 22, 2011
- Genres: Sports, fighting
- Mode: Single-player

UFC Personal Trainer: The Ultimate Fitness System is a fighting and fitness video game created by THQ, based on the Ultimate Fighting Championship. The game requires the Kinect accessory for the Xbox 360 version and the PlayStation Move and PlayStation Eye Camera for the PlayStation 3 version. The Wii version does not require any additional accessories to play.

== Gameplay ==
The game consists of training instructions within three separate sections from three champion UFC fighters and trainers: Muay Thai kickboxer Mark DellaGrotte, Greg Jackson, and Javier Mendez. They start with a warm up, followed by stretching, and then the workout the player has selected from the menu under their section, ending with a cool down stretching period. The instructors give tips, instructions, and encouragement throughout the entire workout. There are also occasionally jokes, such as when Javier Mendez asks if you "need time to wipe your tears" when you pause the game mid-workout. The player can work out alone or side-by-side with a partner.

The player sets up their account using their height and weight and fitness level during a sequence called "The Official Weigh In with Dana White". This includes a short fitness test which can be retaken. There are workouts under each of the three UFC fighters as well as preset 30 or 60 day workouts. The game also contains an option to make customized workouts called "The Customized Workout with Dana White".

As the player progresses, there are prizes and trophies they earn and instructional and motivational videos that they unlock. There are also separate activities they can choose for fun or as a break from their work out.

== Development ==
Initially, the development team approached UFC president Dana White, wanting to make a UFC-based exercise product, who suggested they consult with the National Academy of Sports Medicine to learn how to exercise safely. He then proposed his three top coaches to work with. Motion capture technology was used to capture movements of professional fighters and coaches. Greg Jackson, a UFC trainer, was involved, responsible for the game's mixed martial arts (MMA) and jujitsu elements. Muay Thai kickboxer Mark DellaGrotte and MMA coach Javier Mendez were responsible for the game's kickboxing segments. Scott Ramsdell, working for the National Academy of Sports Medicine, was responsible for the exercise routines. While the game is "not exclusively for men, it is tailored for men," THQ director of production William Schmidt explained.

== Reception ==
Reception

Aggregate score
Aggregator	Score		
Aggregator	PS3	Wii	Xbox 360
Metacritic	65/100	54/100	70/100

Review scores
Publication	Score		
Publication	PS3	Wii	Xbox 360
Eurogamer	N/A	N/A	6/10
Game Informer	N/A	N/A	5/10
GameRevolution	N/A	N/A	B
GamesMaster	N/A	N/A	72%
GameSpot	N/A	N/A	6/10
IGN	4.5/10	4/10	6.5/10
NGamer	N/A	50%	N/A
Official Nintendo Magazine	N/A	71%	N/A
PlayStation Official Magazine – UK	6/10	N/A	N/A
Official Xbox Magazine (US)	N/A	N/A	9/10
Digital Spy	N/A	N/A	4/5

The game received "mixed or average reviews" on all platforms according to the review aggregation website Metacritic. GameSpot's review stated that the Xbox 360 version offers the most exhausting workout in video games, but bugs, repetitive programs, and overlong stretching periods cause the player to "tire for the wrong reasons."
