= UEFA Champions League video games =

Video game series

UEFA Champions League
- Genre: Sports
- Developers: Krisalis Software; Silicon Dreams Studio; Konami; EA Vancouver; Sports Interactive
- Publishers: Virgin Interactive; Eidos Interactive; Konami; EA Sports; Sega
- Platform: Various
- First release: UEFA Champions League 1996/1997; 1996
- Latest release: EA Sports FC 26; Football Manager 26; 2025

The UEFA Champions League video game license has been used by five different companies. Debuting in 1996, the series has only had five games published so far, and after being in the hands of Krisalis Software, Silicon Dreams Studio and Konami, the license now lies in the hands of EA and Sega.

== Krisalis (1996–1998) ==
Krisalis Software had a strong history of football video games in the past, and inclusively released European Club Soccer, a game that simulated the old knockout format in 1992. With the official branding, Krisalis worked on a 3D engine, fitted with the Tacti-grid and gameplay in the line of their older games. It had all 16 teams present in the 1996/1997 Champions League with the actual groups, plus national teams. Only one title was produced, distributed by Philips Media.

== Silicon Dreams (1998–2002) ==
With Silicon Dreams Studio, who also developed the World League Soccer series, Champions League had four titles, 98–99, Season 1999–2000, Season 2000–2001 and 2001–2002 released, aimed mostly at the PlayStation, but PC releases existed for the games. It replaced the national teams with finalists of all competitions since 1960, also including scenarios (in 98–99, with fake settings, in 1999–2000, based on the previous finals, including the 1999 final's last minutes). The first two games were published by Eidos Interactive, whilst the last two were published by Take-Two Interactive.

== EA Sports (2004–2007, 2018–present) ==
In November 2004, Electronic Arts acquired a licensing deal and further development of the game, which was published before the second round of the 2004–05 competition started. It used the same FIFA engine, and was now the fourth licensed football title EA has in its catalogue.

UEFA Champions League 2004–2005 was released in early 2005 for the PlayStation 2, Xbox, Nintendo GameCube and Windows and had licenses to many leagues in Europe, stadiums including Stamford Bridge and Anfield and also licenses to the players for the clubs. Clive Tyldesley and Andy Gray did the commentary for the game and the graphics and gameplay were taken from FIFA Football 2005, released in 2004. A career mode was made into the game where a player had to win the Champions League with various scenarios. EA Sports Talk Radio - a feature previously featured in games such as Madden NFL 2005 - was incorporated into the career mode, and was presented by Patrick Kinghorn and ex-footballer Tony Cascarino. It was also the only UEFA-based video game to be released for the GameCube.

UEFA Champions League 2006–2007 was released by EA Sports in March 2007, for the PS2, PSP, PC and Xbox 360. The PSP, PS2 and PC versions were developed by HB Studios while the Xbox 360 version was developed by EA Canada.

The UEFA Champions League returned to EA Sports in FIFA 19, as EA secured the license after the deal between Konami and UEFA expired. The tournament is available as a standalone tournament mode, in The Journey, Career Mode and in FIFA Ultimate Team related content, with Derek Rae and Lee Dixon as commentators for the tournament.

Despite the game was changed to EA Sports FC following the split between EA and FIFA, EA still has the license for all UEFA club competitions, and UEFA Champions League returned in EA Sports FC 24. Also, EA Sports FC Mobile featured UEFA Champions League tournament mode after it appeared in the predecessor FIFA Mobile as a Live Event only.

== Konami (2008–2018) ==
In September 2008, Konami secured a four-year deal for the rights of the Champions League beginning with Pro Evolution Soccer 2009 and ending with Pro Evolution Soccer 2012. The deal allowed Konami to use the details of the UEFA Champions League in a separate game mode within the game. The deal was later extended in the following years, and UEFA Champions League appeared in other Pro Evolution Soccer games, until 2018.

== Sega (2022–present) ==
In 2022, Sega officially released Football Manager 2023 with the new license of all UEFA club competitions, including UEFA Champions League, UEFA Europa League, UEFA Europa Conference League and UEFA Super Cup. This marks the first time UEFA Champions League appeared in a football management game.

== See also ==
- UEFA European Championship video games
- FIFA World Cup video games
- AFC Champions League#Video game
- Copa Libertadores
- Pro Evolution Soccer series
- FIFA series
- EA Sports FC
- Football Manager
