= EA Sports FC 27 =

2026 video game

- Ultimate Plus edition cover art featuring Kylian Mbappé and Jude Bellingham
- Developers: EA Vancouver; EA Romania
- Publisher: EA Sports
- Series: EA Sports FC
- Engine: Frostbite
- Platforms: Nintendo Switch; Nintendo Switch 2; PlayStation 4; PlayStation 5; Windows; Xbox One; Xbox Series X/S
- Release: WW: 25 September 2026
- Genre: Sports
- Modes: Single-player, Multiplayer

EA Sports FC 27 is an association football simulation video game developed by EA Vancouver and EA Romania and published by EA Sports. It was released on 25 September 2026 for Windows, PlayStation 4, PlayStation 5, Xbox One, Xbox Series X/S, Nintendo Switch, and Nintendo Switch 2. The Asian version was released on 2 October 2026 in South Korea, and is scheduled to be released for Thailand and Vietnam markets in the following weeks and China markets in two weeks later. It is the fourth installment in the EA Sports FC series, succeeding EA Sports FC 26, and the 34th overall installment of EA Sports' football simulation games. The Standard and Ultimate Edition cover features Kylian Mbappé, while the Ultimate Plus Edition cover features both Mbappé and Jude Bellingham.

== Gameplay ==
EA Sports FC 27 introduces more fluid player movement, dynamic corner kicks, improved attacking awareness, player-focused defending designed for competitive play, and additional gameplay refinements based on community feedback. New gameplay updates include enhanced manual defending, rebalanced PlayStyles that place greater emphasis on player attributes, off-balance dribbling for agile players, smarter CPU behaviour, more realistic physical interactions, improved environmental effects, and expanded gameplay sliders for greater control over match settings.

=== Career mode ===
Manager Career has been overhauled with a rebuilt transfer market featuring more realistic valuations through TransferRoom's Expected Transfer Value system, multi-stage negotiations, smarter AI club behaviour, expanded deal structures, and a redesigned Transfer Hub. Dynamic Overall Ratings now change throughout the season based on form, morale, fitness, injuries, and playing time. Career Mode also introduces deeper scouting, improved player development, more realistic squad building, expanded simulation options, unexpected events, and new customization features.

=== Ultimate Team ===
Ultimate Team introduces the FUT Gallery, allowing players to collect and display Player Items, increase their Gallery Level, unlock rewards and further customize their club throughout the season. The mode also adds the Gallery Hub, a customizable showcase for player collections, Holographic Player Items, rarer variants of special cards with unique visual designs, Gallery Tokens redeemable for cosmetic and player rewards, and streamlined Squad Building Challenges (SBCs) with a simplified score-based submission system. It also introduces the Hall of FUT, a new Player Item type celebrating FUT community favorites, featuring inaugural inductees Adebayo Akinfenwa, Marouane Fellaini, Loïc Rémy, Eljero Elia and Giovani dos Santos.

== Development ==
EA Sports FC 27 introduces The Grounds, a social football hub where players can take part in Kickabouts, 1v1 matches, and team up with friends in Clubs mode, while interacting with football mentors, improving their abilities, and customizing their player. The mode is available exclusively on the PlayStation 5, Xbox Series X/S, Windows, and Nintendo Switch 2 versions of the game.

The Grounds is divided into three districts inspired by different football cultures: Montclair (Paris), Zeiza (Buenos Aires), and Parkside (suburban Britain). The central hub, The Terrace, connects the districts and provides access to social spaces, the Clubhouse, stores, and activities. Players can compete in various match formats including 5v5 Rush, play football-themed minigames including Bucket Ball, complete challenges, unlock rewards, and use temporary boosts known as "Amps". The mode features seasonal updates with new events and objectives.

The Grounds features the return of Alex Hunter, the protagonist of The Journey, as one of the mode's football mentors. His inclusion marks his debut in the EA Sports FC series and his first appearance in an EA football title since FIFA 20, where he made a cameo in the Volta Football story mode. The mode also features Kylian Mbappé, Chloe Kelly and Paulo Dybala as football mentors who guide players through the different districts of The Grounds.

The Grounds also features the return of Ted Lasso and A.F.C. Richmond, first featured in FIFA 23, with the addition of the club's women's team.

== Release ==
EA Sports FC 27 was officially announced on 23 July 2026. Pre-orders opened on the same day and remained available until 31 August. Players who purchase the Ultimate Edition or Ultimate Edition Plus receive up to seven days of early access beginning on 18 September, ahead of the worldwide release on 25 September.

Players who pre-order the game receive various in-game bonuses. The Standard Edition includes Career Mode rewards, player items, and cosmetic content for The Grounds, while the Ultimate Edition and Ultimate Edition Plus include additional content such as early access, FC Points, Premium Season Passes and exclusive Ultimate Team rewards. EA Sports FC 27 is rated "16" by PEGI, previously all released games were rated "3".

== Features ==
=== Partnerships ===
On 11 December 2025, European Football Clubs (EFC) and EA Sports FC announced a multi-year partnership intended to strengthen collaboration between the publisher and European football clubs. The agreement aims to support clubs through community initiatives while increasing their visibility across the franchise.

On 27 August 2026, the Bundesliga extended its long-standing partnership with EA Sports FC, first established in 1998, continuing the Bundesliga and 2. Bundesliga in FC 27 and FC Mobile. The agreement is reportedly set to run for seven years and be worth €250 million. On 2 September, Electronic Arts announced a renewed partnership with the ROSHN Saudi League (RSL) for EA Sports FC 27. The agreement was renewed for four years, continuing the inclusion of all RSL clubs and players in EA Sports FC through the 2029–30 season.

=== Licenses ===
EA Sports FC 27 features more than 21,000 licensed players representing over 800 clubs and national teams across more than 140 stadiums and 35 leagues, supported by over 300 football partners worldwide.

On 7 May 2026, the AFC appointed EA Sports FC as an Official Licensed Product of the 2027 AFC Asian Cup, with the tournament set to be integrated into the game.

On 3 June 2026, EA Sports had a partnership deal with the Vietnam Football Federation to adding the Vietnam national football team into the game, as well as FC Online and FC Mobile.

Among the newly licensed additions are the return of Liga MX, marking its first appearance in the EA Sports FC series and its first appearance in an EA football title since FIFA 22, and the inclusion of the Polish Army Stadium, home of Legia Warsaw, making its debut in the series. The game also features the return of Stade Louis II, home of AS Monaco. Additional stadiums include Estadio Carlos Tartiere, home of Real Oviedo, while Emirates Stadium and MHPArena were reconstructed.

Bahia and Botafogo appeared in the game's reveal trailer following their addition to EA Sports FC Mobile through individual licensing agreements with EA. Lazio returned fully licensed to the game for the first time since FIFA 22. Atalanta, Inter Milan and AC Milan will be once again absent due to license issues, and they are instead named Bergamo Calcio, Lombardia FC and Milano FC, respectively.

Among the newly added clubs, Ludogorets made its series debut, becoming the first Bulgarian club to feature in the franchise. Omonia Nicosia was also added to the men's Rest of World selection. The women's teams of BK Häcken, SK Brann, Breiðablik, and FC Twente were added to the game, marking their first appearances in the series as women's teams.

New icons were added to the game, including Christine Sinclair, Ellen White, Formiga, Hege Riise, Tobin Heath, Yuki Nagasato, Karl-Heinz Rummenigge, Sergio Agüero, Pepe and Raphaël Varane. Two additional FUT heroes were elevated to icons, being Lúcio and Yaya Touré.

== Technical improvements ==
EA Sports and TRACAB introduced Project Assist, an early pilot that uses real-time match data and the Frostbite engine to create dynamic, animated visualisations of live football matches. The technology was demonstrated during a La Liga broadcast as "EA SPORTS View", but was not available as a feature in EA Sports FC.

EA Sports FC 27 introduces several PC-specific improvements, including reduced startup times, new Performance and Balanced graphics presets, new High and Ultra specification targets, automatic Steam Friends integration through EA Connect, a VRAM usage indicator, redesigned keyboard controls with WASD and arrow-key layouts, and optional Enhanced Ultra Visuals. The game also includes performance and responsiveness optimizations aimed at reducing the effects of high CPU load.

== Tournaments ==
The inaugural edition of the Red Bull Wings Cup, launched through a partnership between EA Sports and Red Bull, is an EA Sports FC 27 tournament, with regional qualifiers beginning in September 2026 and the World Final scheduled to take place in Miami in January 2027. Limited-edition Red Bull cans feature codes for exclusive FC 27 in-game rewards.

=== Tribute ===
The FC Pro World Championship trophy was renamed in honor of Diogo Jota following approval from his family, recognizing his career in football and achievements in competitive gaming.

== Reception ==
Reception

Aggregate scores
Aggregator	Score
Metacritic	(PS5) 74/100
OpenCritic	68% recommend (Note: Based on 41 reviews.)

The PlayStation 5 version of EA Sports FC 27 received generally favorable reviews from critics, according to the review aggregation website Metacritic. Fellow review aggregator OpenCritic assessed that the game received decent approval, being recommended by 68% of critics.

EA Sports FC 27 received a nomination for "Best Sports/Racing Game" at The Game Awards 2026.
