= Ultimate Team =

Game mode in EA Sports video games

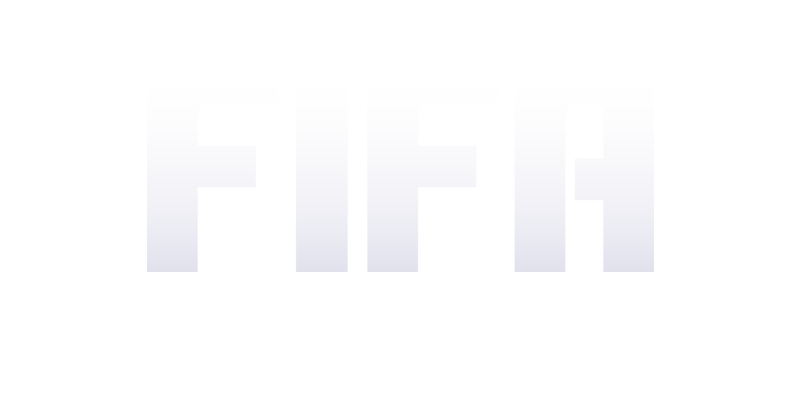
The logo for Ultimate Team used from FIFA 18 to FIFA 20

Ultimate Team, also known as FC Ultimate Team, Football Ultimate Team, and formerly FIFA Ultimate Team – commonly abbreviated as FUT – is an online game mode within the EA Sports association football simulation video game franchises of FIFA and EA Sports FC. It was introduced in the 2008 game FIFA 09 and allows gamers to build an all-star team featuring footballers from different teams in order to compete against other gamers or the game's computer AI. Playing reaps in-game bonuses.

Ultimate Team has been described as "the most important strand of the globe-spanning [EA Sports] mega-franchise" in The Athletic. Streaming matches and pack openings in Ultimate Team is popular among influencers and often watched by younger gamers. Engaging in the Ultimate Team virtual economy is also popular in itself. The mode has been often criticized for its reliance on loot box packs, considered a controversial form of gambling. EA describes Ultimate Team as predominantly a game of skill.

== History ==
Ultimate Team was introduced in the 2008 game FIFA 09. In this edition it was downloadable content only available on PlayStation 3 and Xbox 360, and similar to a mode in the previous EA Sports game UEFA Champions League 2006–2007, as well as FIFA Online series. It allowed gamers to create a team through opening card packs and buying, selling and auctioning cards. With the team they could play against other gamers, offline as well as online. Card packs were bought with Microsoft Points or in-game coins.

The features of Ultimate Team on Nintendo Switch were limited until the 2023 game EA Sports FC 24.

The Ultimate Team also appeared in the mobile version of FIFA and FC, starting from FIFA 13 for iOS, while FIFA 14 is the first game have Ultimate Team for Android and Windows Phone. After that, EA removed all offline features for the future games, so that the mobile version of the next two games were renamed as FIFA 15 Ultimate Team and FIFA 16 Ultimate Team. Since FIFA 17, EA renamed the game once again as FIFA Mobile, now as EA Sports FC Mobile. Similar to the Nintendo Switch versions until EA Sports FC 24, the features of Ultimate Team in the mobile version were limited.

The Ultimate Team also appeared in the online free-to-play EA Sports FC Online series, such as FIFA Online 3 and FIFA Online 4 (later renamed as EA Sports FC Online). Unlike Nintendo Switch and mobile, FC Online have more features that did not found in the Ultimate Team mode in console and PC versions of FIFA/FC.

== Features ==
=== Game modes ===
Ultimate Team game modes all feature the gamer controlling their all-star team in a match. In Squad Battles, the gamer competes against the computer AI and can choose a difficulty setting. In other modes, including Division Rivals and Champions, the gamer competes online against other gamers; difficulty in these modes is managed by gamers increasing in rank through winning and generally only being fielded against similarly-ranked opponents through a ladder and streak system introduced in 2021 game FIFA 22.

It is easier to find online opponents on current-generation consoles (with more gamers) than on older generation consoles and Nintendo Switch. Though competing against other gamers is seen as the main appeal of Ultimate Team, Squad Battles (which also requires an online connection) is an alternative for gamers using platforms with fewer players; it is also considered easier than playing against online opponents, and so is useful for gamers who do not wish to spend to build up coins and rewards in the early stages of the game.

Another way to play and earn rewards in Ultimate Team is through the Moments, though this is not considered a gaming mode and is a form of in-game skills training. Moments is also played against the AI, and it does not typically have gamers play through a full match (instead only moments).

Playing matches provides the gamer with a certain number of coins and – depending on the game mode and the player cards in the team that was used – can count towards objectives that may provide XP (to level up for other rewards), coins, packs, or cards. Rewards can also be won for completing certain in-match requirements, like scoring a certain number of goals.

=== Packs and cards ===
A representation of the squad building user interface in FIFA 21 and eleven Icon player cards arranged in a team. This was the best overall team possible to use in the game, dubbed the "dream team", and a subject of pay-to-win controversy.

Packs and cards in Ultimate Team have been compared to their tangible equivalents in trading cards, though player cards in Ultimate Team include a figure of the footballer that the gamer can control during in-game matches, and packs can also contain manager cards as well as other items and consumables. All teams in the game must have a manager, represented by a manager card. Items are options for aesthetic customization (e.g. kits for the team to wear, stadiums to play in, tifos, and many others) and consumables are single-use cards to boost or maintain player cards (including contracts, healing, manager leagues, and chemistry styles).

Consumables can also be traded in the game. Player figures may be injured in matches, which healing resolves; manager cards may have their league changed to improve chemistry with the rest of the team; and player cards can have generic stats boosted by a chemistry style that relates to a certain playing attitude. Previously, position modifiers were available as consumables, allowing gamers to change the playing position of a player card to improve chemistry, but these were removed in EA Sports FC 24 with the chemistry changes. Chemistry styles (which affect individual player cards) are not directly related to team chemistry, but a chemistry style will have more of an influence if the player card is on maximum team chemistry.

There are player cards for active players in the leagues that are included in each version of the game, as well as special cards, which have higher stats. Special cards include those for retired legendary players, e.g. the Icons cards, and those for active players that have performed well (or are expected to perform well) in competitions during a game's release, e.g. European club competition and Team of the Week cards.

As pack content can be entirely randomized or provide random items meeting certain broad requirements, they are considered loot boxes. Packs can be bought with microtransactions or earned through completing match objectives or Squad Building Challenges (SBCs); specific cards can only be purchased through in-game coins, which cannot legally be purchased with real currency. Other ways to obtain specific cards are through completing match objectives which have individual cards as rewards, or through completing SBCs. In June 2021, an option to preview one pack per day before being given the option to purchase it was added.

With Ultimate Team's launch in 2008, Electronic Arts (EA) became the first major video game developer to include loot boxes in a game, and by 2022 Ultimate Team was still the most recognizable use of them. Microtransactions used to purchase the packs are more lucrative than the sale of the video game, with the revenue generated from Ultimate Team "appraised at $1.6 billion in 2021". In 2022, EA reported that only 10% of packs opened in 2021 game FIFA 22 had been paid for; this raised concerns about whales, gamers who disproportionately spend on microtransactions.

In 2020, NME's Jordan Oloman described the pack opening sequence as featuring "glitz and pomp" and being a "glamorous runway that is engineered to give me dopamine."

==== Highest-rated release roster cards ====
Game	Players	Overall rating	Ref.
FIFA 09	Lionel Messi	90	
FIFA 10	Cristiano Ronaldo	93	
FIFA 11	Lionel Messi	90	
FIFA 12	Lionel Messi	94	
FIFA 13	Lionel Messi	94	
FIFA 14	Lionel Messi	94	
FIFA 15	Lionel Messi	93	
FIFA 16	Lionel Messi	94	
FIFA 17	Cristiano Ronaldo	94	
FIFA 18	Cristiano Ronaldo	94	
FIFA 19	Cristiano Ronaldo, Lionel Messi	94	
FIFA 20	Lionel Messi	94	
FIFA 21	Lionel Messi	93	
FIFA 22	Lionel Messi	93	
FIFA 23	Kylian Mbappé, Karim Benzema, Robert Lewandowski, Kevin De Bruyne, Lionel Messi	91	
FC 24	Alexia Putellas, Erling Haaland, Kevin De Bruyne, Kylian Mbappé	91	
FC 25	Kylian Mbappé, Rodri, Aitana Bonmatí, Erling Haaland	91	

=== Chemistry ===
Building an all-star team in Ultimate Team is reliant not only on the individual quality (overall rating) of the player cards, but also on the game's chemistry system. The team chemistry is affected by manager and player cards' nationalities, leagues and teams – and is default higher for higher-rated cards. Player cards must be used in a correct position to have chemistry. Teams with more connections will have higher chemistry, and teams with higher chemistry are boosted in-game to play better.

The chemistry system was significantly changed in FIFA 23 (2022) and then again in EA Sports FC 24 (2023). The changes focused on removing the previous need to have player cards with connections in adjacent positions for chemistry to be applied. As a way of doing this while still keeping some restrictions on playing position, the changes ultimately allowed gamers to assign player cards to any of their realistic alternative positions (based on how the footballers played in real life).

=== Squad Building Challenges ===
A Squad Building Challenge (SBC) is an item swapping option that allows gamers to swap player cards they own in exchange for packs or specific items, which can include player cards and other items. SBCs typically have an expiration date, making specific items obtainable through them limited. SBCs require gamers to swap anywhere between a single card and multiple complete starting XIs of cards in exchange for the reward, and typically have the "challenge" of one or more of the cards needing to meet certain requirements (e.g. in rating, containing specific leagues, etc.).

The benefit of SBCs is the ability to swap unwanted player cards directly for desirable limited edition ones, which Screen Rant said was the "easiest and cheapest way" to acquire good cards. Player cards acquired directly from SBCs cannot be traded in the game's market (not including those in packs acquired from SBCs, which may be able to be traded). There are introductory Squad Building Challenges available early in the game, with low-value player cards swapped for low-value packs, to introduce new players to the feature, as well as some advanced fundamental challenges that do not expire.

SBCs are popular enough that there are many websites dedicated to discovering the best ways to complete them, using the lowest-rated or cheapest possible player card combinations; however, following such recommendations may require gamers to pay for suitable player cards they do not already own to then swap, incurring additional cost, rather than swapping better cards they already own.

=== Evolutions ===
A new feature was added to Ultimate Team for EA Sports FC 24 in Evolutions, which allows gamers to "evolve" certain player cards to improve the attributes of the player figures for matches. Radio Times compared the feature to an RPG, and suggested it would be most popular among gamers who wanted to play as their favorite footballers from lower divisions in the game and could make such player cards better. Gamers can layer different Evolutions on certain player cards to improve them even further. Sports Illustrated wrote that the feature allowed for player cards to stay relevant for longer – rather than become obsolete as higher-rated cards were released later in the game – and so gamers would not need to buy as many packs to have good cards.

== Reception ==
=== Streaming ===
It is common for influencers as well as regular gamers to stream videos of themselves either playing matches in Ultimate Team or, commonly, opening lots of packs. Streaming is often done on YouTube and Twitch.

Streamers for the game include IShowSpeed, Erbz, El Xokas and TheGrefg.

=== Pay-to-win criticisms ===
According to Oloman, as Ultimate Team streaming became more popular, this encouraged gamers to focus less on building an ultimate team of their choosing and to instead engage with the highest-priced player cards or on trading within the game's virtual economy. In his research on the relationship of gamers to Ultimate Team, academic Jeroen Lemmens determined that "opening loot boxes generally improves [gamers'] perceived competence, autonomy and relatedness", and that the amount of money spent on loot boxes (pay-to-win) was not the best measure of achievement in the game.

In 2021, Twitch streamer and YouTuber ScudzTV wrote a viral Twitter thread criticizing the in-game encouragement, and apparent need, of pay-to-win in Ultimate Team. ScudzTV modeled a "dream team" of the best player cards for each position in FIFA 21 (see #Packs and cards); if not opening packs to acquire the cards, the squad would have cost around 100 million in-game coins at the time, which ScudzTV calculated as requiring 22,000 hours to earn through grinding matches or 1,650 hours through trading. The thread saw many responses in agreement that it did not feel possible to have a competitive edge in the game without paying for packs, with the alternative being impossibly time-restrictive. Website Goal used a similar squad to make the same calculations shortly afterwards, resulting in similar (and longer) periods of time, as well as calculating that it would cost around $50,000/£40,000 of money in packs to trade to make enough coins. EA responded to the thread with a spokesperson telling the media that the time calculations were based on assumptions and that gamers did not need the best player cards to be successful, adding "In the real world, no football club has the world's highest-rated players in each of the 11 positions."

Attempting to summarize views of the gaming community, ScudzTV said that monetization itself was not an issue, but over-monetization and paying for the chance of an item rather than the item itself were. ScudzTV suggested that if EA wanted to show commitment to not requiring pay-to-win, they could change the pack weight – generally, odds – so that acquiring better cards in any pack was more likely. Besides making these player cards easier to acquire without paying for packs, more of them would also make them cheaper on the resale market.

=== Gambling criticism ===
The random nature of packs and the ability to buy them with real currency has caused them to be negatively compared to gambling "for as long as they've been around". Gamers are incentivized to continue opening more packs through intermittent reinforcement schedules – being irregularly vindicated in their behavior – due to packs providing better content irregularly, with "the mechanisms underlying the effectiveness of loot boxes [...] considered similar, if not identical, to the reward schedules that are used in the design of slot machines, making them addictive by design." Various research has argued that the similarities to gambling make loot boxes more motivational than the rewards already are, increasing engagement, and that the similarities to gambling make gamers perceive gambling to be more effective than it is, leading to gamers developing habitual gambling behavior. Research has shown that problem loot box use is more closely related to gambling addiction than it is to video game addiction. People who have video game addiction are likely to suffer financial harm as games become increasingly monetized.

The issues related to loot box packs "are considered especially problematic for the younger generation of [gamers]". Though EA has said only gamers aged 13 or older can play Ultimate Team, there are no enforced restrictions on gamers who are children accessing the packs. Young people are more susceptible to developing gambling addiction, and the group that spends the most time playing Ultimate Team is younger people with traits of video game addiction.

Ultimate Team has also had issues facing gambling legislation in various, typically European, nations. After packs were banned in Belgium and EA initially fined in the Netherlands, two separate lawsuits were filed in France in 2020, alleging that packs are a "gambling game" embedded within Ultimate Team that is "an illusionary and particularly addictive system." The British government spent nearly two years debating whether to regulate loot boxes as betting, before deciding to allow the video game industry to continue regulating them in 2022 due to "significant implementation challenges" in doing so itself. In 2023, the district court of Hermagor in Austria ruled that the packs were a form of "illegal gambling" in violation of Austria's gambling laws, and that gamers should be refunded; the lawsuit had been filed by PlayStation gamers against its manufacturer, Sony, due to packs being bought on the platform-specific PlayStation Store. Advocacy groups in the United States requested in 2022 that the Federal Trade Commission investigate Ultimate Team.
