= FIFA 06 =

2005 video game

- British and Irish cover art with Manchester United's Wayne Rooney (left) and Barcelona's Ronaldinho
- Developers: EA Canada, Exient Entertainment (DS/GBA)
- Publisher: Electronic Arts
- Series: FIFA
- Platforms: Windows Consoles: GameCube PlayStation 2 Xbox; Handheld: PlayStation Portable Nintendo DS Game Boy Advance; Mobile: Java ME Mobile phone
- Release: AU: 27 September 2005; EU: 30 September 2005; AU: 3 October 2005 (GC, DS); NA: 4 October 2005; AU: 10 October 2005 (PC); Game Boy Advance: PAL: 30 September 2005; NA: 11 October 2005; PlayStation Portable: NA: 11 October 2005; EU: 21 October 2005; AU: 24 October 2005; Mobile: NA: 2005
- Genre: Sports
- Modes: Single-player, multiplayer

FIFA 06, known as FIFA Soccer 06 in North America, is a football simulation video game developed by EA Canada and published by Electronic Arts under the EA Sports label. It was released in the United States on 4 October 2005 for the PlayStation 2, Xbox, GameCube, Microsoft Windows, and Nintendo DS. It was later released for PlayStation Portable, Game Boy Advance and mobile phones.

FIFA 06 was the thirteenth game in the FIFA series and the tenth in 3D. This was the last and only FIFA edition to be released exclusively on sixth-generation consoles. The taglines for the game were "You play. They obey." and "The total soccer experience".

Ronaldinho and Wayne Rooney were featured on the cover of the game in the European, Australian, and Brazilian markets. Freddy Adu and Omar Bravo joined Ronaldinho on the North American cover, while Lukas Podolski was partnered with Ronaldinho on the German release of the game and Park Chu-Young was on the South Korea cover.

== Game features ==
Developers of the FIFA series made a complete overhaul of the game's engine for the 2006 installment of the game, asserting it has improved the control of play, having rewritten more than half the programming code for the game. In addition to a renovation of the game engine which discards the "ball" system, developers boast a significantly more involved career mode and the introduction of "chemistry" which will determine how good teams play together.

=== Career mode ===
Career mode spans 15 in-game seasons as the manager of a club of the player's choice. The user starts by filling in basic details such as their name, date of birth, and country. From here, the player gets to choose which team they would like to manage; however, only clubs with a 4-star rating or below are selectable unless the player has bought the "Career Teams" bundle from the in-game fan shop. In a new addition to the game players now must manage a minimum budget to build the club around. The budget can be spent on players, upgrading staff and coaches at the club and transfer budgets. Players must now also use their best managerial skills to negotiate a sponsor to the club. Sponsors, a new addition to career mode, provide a weekly payment to the club as well as extra bonuses through winning cups and meeting expectations of the club. If the manager does not meet these expectations, they may risk losing their sponsor at the end of the season. Some sponsors within the game are real organisations while others are simply made up.

Management requires balancing board expectations, player morale, team chemistry, and supporter satisfaction. Success in these areas is primarily driven by match results. Fulfilling board objectives ensures a manager's tenure for the following season, whereas failing to meet them can result in contract termination. Accumulating multiple dismissals eventually ends the managerial career mode.

Player morale becomes a large issue to the future of the player's club and their managerial future. Players must keep their squad happy to maintain them at the club and to keep them at their best performances. An unhappy squad can result in players refusing new contracts with the club and eventually leaving, which can be vital to the success of the club. Team chemistry is a result of the squad's morale and how often the current squad plays together. If the team is happy and are regularly playing together, team chemistry will be high. If the current squad is unhappy and hasn't played a game in seasons, team chemistry will be low therefore it is important to keep a balanced squad while maintaining success.

FIFA 06 also introduces staff which help the club. By upgrading the staff, this helps the club to improve depending on the area that has been upgraded. For example, if the user upgrades the negotiator to a higher level, the negotiator will be able to bring better players to the club for less money. Staff upgrades cost money which comes out of the budget.

Career mode also features a "manager history" section which shows your statistics as a manager for each season you play. It includes your season record, where your team finished in the ladder, and any cups the team won. Statistics for the current season are available including leading goalscorers, card recipients, team stats, league standings, and cup competition fixtures. It features three European Cup Competitions: ECC, EFA, and the European Super Cup. The ECC is the game's equivalent to the UEFA Champions League. The EFA is the equivalent to the UEFA Cup. The European Super Cup is of the same name in UEFA competition, which pits the winners of the ECC and EFA in a match right before the following season.

=== FIFA 06 Lounge ===
The FIFA 06 Lounge is a new introduction into the game. It is an upgraded form of multiplayer mode which allows up to eight human players to compete to see who is the best player over a series of matches. Each player selects a name to be identified as and a team to play as. Players can also change the rules of the game to suit their playing style. Depending on who wins and loses, players are given advantages and disadvantages to play with. Featured styles of matches in the lounge are:

- Winner Stays On: The winner of the previous game plays on and faces a new challenger.
- Winner vs. Highest Ranked: The winner of the previous game plays the best ranked player in the rankings
- Winner vs. Lowest Ranked: The winner of the previous game faces the worst ranked player in the competition
- Rematch: A rematch between the two players that just played
- Rematch Switch: A rematch between the two players that just played with the home team and away team switched
- Best vs. Worst: The best player vs. the worst team according to team star rating
- Catch-Up: Players can set a handicapped score on one player and the disadvantaged player must attempt to catch up to the handicapped player before the game ends

The mode also includes a leaderboard featuring leading point ratings, points, wins, goals, bookings, clean sheets, offsides, longest winning streak, longest undefeated streak, and longest losing streak. League standings are featured as well as the ability to save the session so players can play at a later date.

=== Team management ===
Team management gives the player the ability to edit the game to suit themselves. The mode provides the ability to create a player and edit any player, kit number, squad, and kick takers in the game as well as the ability to transfer players to other clubs and the ability to select players for their international teams.

=== Retro and extras ===
One of the new features in FIFA 06 is a special "retro" mode which features nostalgia of the game. Inside it features an unlockable classic biographies section, a memorable moments video compilation which features ten of the most memorable moments as judged by the FIFA 06 developers, and a video compilation with a retrospective view at all the games in FIFA series with "Cobrastyle" by Teddybears featuring Mad Cobra playing as the background music.

Like NHL 06, and NBA Live 06, the game also has a classic 16-bit game in the PS2 version, FIFA International Soccer, which was the original game in the series. In the extras section is:

- A video interview with Barcelona striker Samuel Eto'o.
- A series of tutorial videos on how to use the new features in the game.
- Video previews for NBA Live 06, FIFA Street 2, and Madden NFL 06
- Unlockable season highlights from the 2004–05 seasons of the German Bundesliga, Premier League, French Division 1, and Italian Serie A

=== Challenges and unlockables ===
FIFA 06 has introduced challenges for the player to achieve in order to win points and unlock prizes. The challenges are divided up into 10 regions of ten to twelve challenges based on the countries they can be achieved in. There are more than 100 different challenges for the player to achieve on all four difficulty levels, although a fifth difficulty can be achieved, which is legendary.

With the points earned in the challenges, prizes can be unlocked. Such unlockables in the game include classic player biographies, new camera angles, alternate club kits, stadiums, and videos.

==== Classic XI & World League XI ====
The game also features a Classic XI team, assembled by EA Sports, consisting of great football legends, and a World XI team, consisting of current superstars, chosen by FIFPro. Both teams have the Cardiff Millennium Stadium as their primary ground. These clubs must be unlocked in the "Fan Shop" with "FIFA Points".

=== Commentary ===
This installment broke a short tradition of commentating from John Motson and Ally McCoist, replaced by ITV's Clive Tyldesley and Sky Sports pundit Andy Gray for the game's English-language version.

== FIFA 06: Road to FIFA World Cup ==
The Xbox 360 version, titled FIFA 06: Road to FIFA World Cup, featured only national teams and a brand-new engine taking advantage of the Xbox 360's graphical capabilities. It was the first FIFA game on a seventh-generation console.

== Reception ==
Reception

Aggregate scores
Aggregator	Score						
Aggregator	DS	GBA	GameCube	PC	PS2	PSP	Xbox
GameRankings	66.22%	49.50%	80.50%	80.69%	78.29%	73.33%	79.80%
Metacritic	75/100	70/100	80/100	78/100	80/100	77/100	80/100

Review scores
Publication	Score						
Publication	DS	GBA	GameCube	PC	PS2	PSP	Xbox
Eurogamer	N/A	N/A	N/A	N/A	N/A	N/A	7/10
Game Informer	N/A	N/A	8/10	N/A	8/10	7.5/10	8/10
GamePro	N/A	N/A	N/A	N/A	4/5	4/5	4/5
GameRevolution	N/A	N/A	N/A	N/A	B−	N/A	B
GameSpot	7.6/10	N/A	N/A	8.9/10	9/10	8.7/10	9.2/10
GameSpy	N/A	N/A	N/A	N/A	4/5	N/A	4.5/5
GameZone	N/A	N/A	9/10	N/A	8.7/10	6.9/10	9.3/10
IGN	8.1/10	N/A	8.5/10	8.7/10	8.7/10	7.4/10	8.7/10
Nintendo Power	8/10	7/10	9/10	N/A	N/A	N/A	N/A
Official Nintendo Magazine	75%	N/A	74%	N/A	N/A	N/A	N/A
Official U.S. PlayStation Magazine	N/A	N/A	N/A	N/A	4.5/5	4.5/5	N/A
Official Xbox Magazine (US)	N/A	N/A	N/A	N/A	N/A	N/A	7.9/10
PC Gamer (UK)	N/A	N/A	N/A	83%	N/A	N/A	N/A
Detroit Free Press	N/A	N/A	N/A	N/A	N/A	3/4	4/4
The Times	N/A	N/A	4/5	4/5	4/5	N/A	4/5

At the time it was the highest-selling game of the FIFA series, ahead of its predecessor FIFA 2005 by over 100,000 copies. In total, FIFA 06 has sold more than 3.6 million copies.

The PlayStation 2 version of FIFA 06 received a "Double Platinum" sales award from the Entertainment and Leisure Software Publishers Association (ELSPA), indicating sales of at least 600,000 copies in the United Kingdom. Across all platforms, it sold more than 1 million copies in the United Kingdom, making it the UK's best-selling game of 2005, above rival Pro Evolution Soccer 5 in second place.

The game was met with positive to very mixed reception. GameRankings and Metacritic gave it a score of 80.69% and 78 out of 100 for the PC version; 80.50% and 80 out of 100 for the GameCube version; 79.80% and 80 out of 100 for the Xbox version; 78.29% and 80 out of 100 for the PlayStation 2 version; 73.33% and 77 out of 100 for the PSP version; 66.22% and 75 out of 100 for the DS version; and 49.50% and 70 out of 100 for the Game Boy Advance version.
