= FIFA (video game series) =

- Logo used from 2020 to 2023
- Genres: Sports simulation (football)
- Developers: Extended Play Productions (1993–1997); EA Vancouver (1997–2022); EA Romania (2016–2022); ENVER (2026); Refactor Games (2026)
- Publishers: EA Sports (1993–2023); ENVER (2026); Delphi Interactive (2026)
- Platforms: Mega Drive/Genesis, Amiga, MS-DOS, N-Gage, 32X, Mega-CD/Sega CD, Master System, Game Gear, Saturn, GameCube, Gizmondo, PlayStation, PlayStation 2, PlayStation 3, PlayStation 4, PlayStation 5, PlayStation Portable, PlayStation Vita, Super NES, Nintendo 64, Nintendo DS, Nintendo 3DS, Wii, Wii U, Nintendo Switch, Nintendo Switch 2, Game Boy, Game Boy Color, Game Boy Advance, 3DO, Windows, iOS, Java Platform, Micro Edition, Android, Xperia Play, Xbox 360, Xbox, Xbox One, Xbox Series X/S, Windows Phone, macOS, Zeebo, Stadia
- Original release: Annually, 1993–2022
- First release: FIFA International Soccer; 15 December 1993
- Latest release: FIFA Heroes; 24 June 2026

FIFA is an association football simulation video game franchise. Between 1993 and 2022, it was developed by EA Vancouver and EA Romania and published by EA Sports. After a four-year hiatus, it returned in 2026 with three games: FIFA Super Soccer, developed by Gamefam and published on Roblox, FIFA Heroes, developed and published by ENVER, and FIFA World Cup: Launch Edition released on Netflix.

As of 2011, the FIFA franchise has been localised into 18 languages and available in 51 countries. Listed in Guinness World Records as the best-selling sports video game franchise in the world, the FIFA series has sold more than 325 million copies as of 2021. On 10 May 2022, it was announced that EA and FIFA's partnership of 30 years may come to an end upon the termination of their licensing agreement, making FIFA 23 the last entry to the franchise under the FIFA name. As a successor to the FIFA series, EA launched the EA Sports FC franchise, with EA Sports FC 24 being the first installment under the new name.

Football video games such as Tehkan World Cup, Sensible Soccer, Kick Off and Match Day had been developed since the late 1980s, and were already competitive in the games market when EA Sports announced a football game as the next addition to their EA Sports label. When the series began with FIFA International Soccer on the Mega Drive in late 1993, it was notable for being the first to have an official license from FIFA, the world governing body of football. The main series has been complemented by additional installments based on single major tournaments, such as the FIFA World Cup, UEFA Champions League, UEFA Europa League and UEFA European Football Championship, as well as a series of football management titles. Since the 1990s, the franchise's main competitor has been Konami's eFootball series (formerly known as Pro Evolution Soccer, or PES).

FIFA 12 holds the record for the "fastest selling sports game ever" with more than 3.2 million games sold and more than $186 million generated at retail in its first week of release. The franchise's final release under EA Sports, FIFA 23, was released worldwide on 27 September 2022. It is available for multiple gaming systems, including the PlayStation 4 and Xbox One.

== History ==
Release timeline
1993	FIFA International Soccer
1994	FIFA Soccer 95
1995	FIFA Soccer 96
1996	FIFA 97
1997	FIFA: Road to World Cup 98
1997	FIFA 64
1998	FIFA World Cup 98
1998	FIFA 99
1999	FIFA 2000
2000	FIFA 2001
2001	FIFA Football 2002
2002	2002 FIFA World Cup
2002	FIFA Football 2003
2003	FIFA Football 2004
2004	FIFA Football 2005
2005	FIFA Street
2005	FIFA 06
2006	FIFA Street 2
2006	2006 FIFA World Cup
2006	FIFA 07
2007	FIFA 08
2008	FIFA Street 3
2008	FIFA 09
2009	FIFA 10
2010	2010 FIFA World Cup South Africa
2010	FIFA 11
2011	FIFA 12
2012	FIFA Street
2012	FIFA 13
2013	FIFA 14
2013	FIFA World
2014	2014 FIFA World Cup Brazil
2014	FIFA 15
2015	FIFA 16
2016	FIFA 17
2016	FIFA Mobile
2017	FIFA 18
2018	FIFA 19
2019	FIFA 20
2020	FIFA 21
2021	FIFA 22
2022	FIFA 23

While FIFA 95 did not add much other than the ability to play with club teams, FIFA 96 pushed the boundaries. For the first time with real player names by obtaining the FIFPro license, the PlayStation, PC, 32X and Sega Saturn versions used EA's "Virtual Stadium" engine, with 2D sprite players moving around a real-time 3D stadium. FIFA 97 improved on this with polygonal models for players and added an indoor soccer mode, but an early pinnacle was reached with FIFA: Road to World Cup 98. This version featured much improved graphics, a complete World Cup with qualifying rounds (including all national teams) and refined gameplay. Months later, World Cup 98 was EA's first officially licensed tournament game.

John Motson was the first commentator for the FIFA series, and has worked alongside Ally McCoist, Andy Gray, Des Lynam, Mark Lawrenson and Chris Waddle. Motson first joined the franchise for FIFA 96; he and McCoist were replaced by Gray and Clive Tyldesley for FIFA 06 but later returned for FIFA Manager 08. Martin Tyler was the default commentator for the FIFA series from 2006 to 2020, alongside Andy Gray between 2006 and 2010 and Alan Smith from 2011 to 2020. Derek Rae and Lee Dixon appear in FIFA 19 as commentators for UEFA competitions, and alternate with Tyler and Smith in all competitions in FIFA 20. Rae and Dixon became the sole English-language commentators in FIFA 21, replacing Tyler and Smith. In FIFA 22 and FIFA 23, Stewart Robson serves as Derek Rae's co-commentator, replacing Dixon. Guy Mowbray and Sue Smith were introduced as a new commentary duo in EA Sports FC 24, alternating with Derek Rae and Stewart Robson.

FIFA games have been met with some minor criticism, such as improvements each game features over its predecessor. As the console market expanded, FIFA was challenged directly by other titles, most notably Konami's Pro Evolution Soccer (PES) series. The rivalry between both franchises since the 1990s has been considered the "greatest rivalry" in the history of sports video games. While FIFA initially had a more "arcade-style" approach, PES was more of a football simulation video game series with "faster-paced tactical play" and more varied emergent gameplay, which led to PES rivaling FIFA in sales during the 2000s. EA responded by borrowing gameplay elements from PES in order to improve FIFA, which led to FIFA pulling ahead commercially by a significant margin in the early 2010s. Both FIFA and Pro Evolution Soccer have a large following, but FIFA sales were rising by as much as 23 percent year-on-year in the early 2010s.

By 2000, the FIFA series had sold more than 16 million units worldwide, making it the best-selling association football video game series. In 2010, the FIFA series had sold more than 100 million copies, making it the best-selling sports video game franchise in the world and the most profitable EA Sports title. With FIFA 12 selling 3.2 million copies in the first week after its 27 September North American debut in 2011, EA Sports dubbed it "the most successful launch in EA Sports history".

In 2012, EA Sports signed Lionel Messi to the FIFA franchise, luring him away from the competitor Pro Evolution Soccer. Messi's likeness was then immediately placed on the cover of FIFA Street. In 2013, the Spanish professional women's footballer Vero Boquete started a petition on Change.org, which called upon Electronic Arts to introduce female players in the FIFA series. The petition attracted 20,000 signatures in 24 hours. FIFA 16, released on 25 September 2015, included female national teams.

In 2018, Steve Boxer of The Guardian called FIFA 18 "the slickest, most polished and by far the most popular football game around" and "football [video] games' equivalent of the Premier League". He praised the game's FIFA Ultimate Team, which "encourages you to purchase Panini-sticker-like player packs to build up a dream team", adding the series has "an excellent Journey mode that lets you control an aspiring pro and build him up to an international superstar, and a Career mode that lets you control your favourite team on and off the field." The sixth best-selling video game franchise, by 2021, the FIFA series had sold more than 325 million copies.

The latest installments in the series contain many exclusively licensed leagues including leagues and teams from around the world, including the German Bundesliga and 2. Bundesliga, English Premier League and EFL Championship, Italian Serie A and Serie B, Spanish La Liga and La Liga 2, French Ligue 1 and Ligue 2, Portuguese Primeira Liga, Turkish Süper Lig, Dutch Eredivisie, Scottish Premiership, the Swiss Super League, Russian Premier League, Polish Ekstraklasa, Mexican Liga MX, American Major League Soccer, South Korean K-League, Japanese J1 League, the Chinese Super League, Saudi Professional League, Australian A-League, Chilean Primera División, Brazilian Campeonato Brasileiro Série A, Argentine Liga Profesional de Fútbol, allowing the use of real leagues, clubs and player names and likenesses within the games. Popular clubs from around the world, including some teams from Greece, the Indian Super League, Ukraine and South Africa, are also included, without those nations' entire leagues. They are available in the "Rest of World" section.

=== Discontinuation and future ===
As EA Sports and FIFA had failed to reach an agreement over licensing fees for the use of the FIFA name, FIFA 23 became the last installment of the game developed by EA Sports under the name. EA Sports continued to release football games under the title EA Sports FC beginning in 2023, while FIFA has stated an intention to enter a partnership with a new developer to produce a FIFA game in 2024. FIFA president Gianni Infantino stated, "I can assure you that the only authentic, real game that has the FIFA name will be the best one available for gamers and football fans." He added that "the FIFA name is the only global, original title. FIFA 23, FIFA 24, FIFA 25 and FIFA 26, and so on – the constant is the FIFA name and it will remain forever and remain the best." In October 2024, FIFA partnered with Konami to host two FIFAe World Cup editions in Konami's eFootball. EA Sports FC 24 featured exclusive partnerships with the Premier League, La Liga, Ligue 1, Bundesliga, Serie A, and MLS. In October 2025, FIFA announced the release of FIFA Heroes, their first non-EA Sports video game title.

== Games in the series ==
=== 1990s ===
==== FIFA International Soccer ====
- Cover athlete: David Platt and Piotr Świerczewski (Packie Bonner and Ruud Gullit in some versions)
- Released for: Mega Drive/Genesis, MS-DOS, Amiga, Sega CD (as FIFA International Soccer Championship Edition), 3DO, Super NES, Master System, Game Gear, Game Boy
- Release dates: 15 December 1993 (Mega Drive), 1994 (ports)

Known as EA Soccer during development and sometimes subsequently also known as FIFA '94, the first game in the series was released for the Mega Drive in the weeks leading up to Christmas 1993. This greatly hyped football title broke with traditional 16-bit era games by presenting an isometric view rather than the more usual top-down view (Kick Off), side view (European Club Soccer), or bird's eye view (Tehkan World Cup and Sensible Soccer). It only includes national teams, and real player names are not used. A notorious bug allows the player to score by standing in front of the goalkeeper so that the ball rebounds off him into the net. The game was number one in the UK charts, replacing Street Fighter II Special Champion Edition, and staying there for a full six months. Mega placed the game at #11 in their Top 50 Mega Drive Games of All Time. The Mega-CD version was released under the title "FIFA International Soccer Championship Edition" it includes some features used in the next title, and is a highly polished version of the original. This version was ranked No. 7 on the Mega list of the "Top 10 Mega CD Games of All Time". The game on the 3DO console sported pseudo-3D cameras and it was the most graphically advanced version. The game is also playable on the PlayStation 2 version of FIFA 06. It was made in celebration for the 1994 FIFA World Cup held in the United States – especially noticeable in the Super NES version which, despite having a smaller team selection than the Genesis version, had three exclusive teams which qualified for the real-life tournament: Bolivia, Saudi Arabia and South Korea. The game was called International Soccer so EA could sell the game successfully in Europe, after assuming Americans would have no interest in the game.

==== FIFA 95 ====
- Cover athlete: Erik Thorstvedt (Alexi Lalas in some versions)
- Released for: Mega Drive/Genesis
- Release date: 10 November 1994

Using the same engine with only minor touch-ups, FIFA 95 introduced club teams to the series within eight national leagues: Brazil, Germany's Bundesliga, Italy's Serie A, Spain's La Liga, England's Premier League, France's Ligue 1, Netherlands' Eredivisie and the United States. Most of the leagues have team lineups based on the 1993–94 season, and the teams, although recognisably real, all still have generic players, many of them even returning from the previous game. The USA League consists of teams and players from the A-League, the country's second division – subsequent editions would feature "artificial" division one leagues, a feature not corrected until the 2000 edition, when Major League Soccer was included for the first time. In addition, the Brazilian league contained only teams from São Paulo and Rio de Janeiro states, with the exception of Internacional, from Rio Grande do Sul—it would not be until FIFA 07 that Campeonato Brasileiro represented the country. The game eliminates the one-touch passing seen in the original FIFA International Soccer. This was also the only game in the main series not to be released in more than one platform (counting spin-offs, only FIFA 64 and certain versions of the FIFA Manager series share this distinction).

==== FIFA 96 ====
- Cover athlete: Ioan Ovidiu Sabau and Jason McAteer (European version)
- Released for: MS-DOS, Windows, PlayStation, Saturn, 32X, Super NES, Mega Drive/Genesis, Game Gear, Game Boy
- Release date: 30 September 1995

This is the first FIFA game with real-time 3D graphics on the Saturn, PlayStation, MS-DOS, and Windows, using technology called "Virtual Stadium". It is also the first in the series to present players with real player names and positions, with ranking, transfer and team customisation tools. However, the Brazilian teams had mostly inaccurate rosters, some of them even featuring long-retired players (this would only be corrected in FIFA 99), and the American league consisted of entirely fictitious teams and rosters (Major League Soccer had been inaugurated for only a few months as of the game's release, but it would only start to appear in the games as of FIFA 2000). The Super NES and Mega Drive versions use an updated version of FIFA 95's engine with new teams and graphics. It is also the first FIFA game to contain a player/team editor (in the Mega Drive and fifth-generation versions only). Also, in addition to the eight national leagues of the previous game, three leagues debuted in the game: Scottish Football League Premier Division, Allsvenskan and Super League Malaysia, a lineup that would stay for the next two editions as well. This was also the first FIFA game to have a proper introduction.

==== FIFA 97 ====
- Cover athlete: David Ginola (European version); Bebeto (rest of the world)
- Released for: MS-DOS, Windows, PlayStation, Saturn, Mega Drive/Genesis, Super NES, Game Boy
- Release date: 30 November 1996

The biggest change in FIFA '97 was the inclusion of 6-a-side indoor soccer mode and polygonal players, with motion capture provided by David Ginola. The game features a much higher number of playable leagues from England, Spain, France, Italy, the Netherlands, Germany and Malaysia. These versions also feature commentary by John Motson, partnered by Andy Gray, with Des Lynam introducing the matches.

==== FIFA: Road to World Cup 98 ====
- Cover athlete: Roy Lassiter (USA); David Beckham (UK); Paolo Maldini (Italy); David Ginola (France); Andreas Möller (Germany); Raúl (Spain)
- Title song: "Song 2" by Blur
- Released for: Windows, PlayStation, Nintendo 64, Saturn, Super NES, Mega Drive/Genesis, Game Boy
- Release date: 8 November 1997

This game marks the start of an upward trend in the series. It boasts a refined graphics engine, team and player customisation options, 16 stadia, improved artificial intelligence, a "Road to World Cup" mode with all FIFA-registered national teams, and a licensed soundtrack featuring popular musical artists of the time. The game features many accurate team squads for national call up when playing in the round robin qualification modes. Another new feature was the ability to manually change the referee's strictness, allowing some fouls to go un-noticed or without punishment.

Additionally, for the first time in a FIFA game, the offside rule is properly implemented. In previous games, when a player was in an offside position doing anything except running, that player was penalised for offside even when the ball was passed backwards. The 32-bit version of FIFA 98 corrects this so that the game would only award a free kick for offside if the ball was passed roughly to where the player in the offside position was.

FIFA 98 was also the first of the series to feature a licensed soundtrack, with "Song 2" by Blur used as the intro track for the game. It was the last FIFA game to be released on the 16-bit consoles that the series had originated on.

==== FIFA 99 ====
- Cover athlete: Dennis Bergkamp (World), Kasey Keller (USA), Fabien Barthez (France), Hidetoshi Nakata (Japan); Olaf Thon (Germany); Rui Costa (Portugal); Christian Vieri (Italy); Ahn Jung-hwan (South Korea); Fernando Morientes (Spain); Jason Kreis (USA beta)
- Title song: "The Rockafeller Skank (Remix)" by Fatboy Slim
- Released for: Windows, PlayStation, Nintendo 64
- Release date: 30 November 1998. No description.

==== FIFA 2000 ====
- Title song: "It's Only Us" by Robbie Williams
- Cover athlete: Hidetoshi Nakata (Japan); Sol Campbell (UK); Vincenzo Montella (Italy); Pep Guardiola (Spain); Emmanuel Petit (France); Jaap Stam (Netherlands); Vasilios Tsiartas (Greece); Mehmet Scholl (Germany); Simão (Portugal); Eddie Pope (US); Raí (Brazil); Pär Zetterberg (Sweden); Đovani Roso (Israel); Kim Byung-ji (South Korea); Kiatisuk Senamuang (Thailand);
- Released for: Windows, PlayStation, Game Boy Color
- Release date: 26 October 1999

This version of the FIFA series contained over 40 "classic" teams, so that gamers could play as retired football legends.

It marked the introduction of Major League Soccer, replacing the fictitious "American" league previously included, as well as national leagues from Denmark, Greece, Israel, Norway and Turkey (though Galatasaray is not present in the game), albeit removing the Portuguese Liga.

The game received mixed reviews due to its cartoonish graphic engine and shallow gameplay, a brand new engine was implemented in an attempt to give more "emotion" to the 3D player models. The game was generally considered to be much inferior than its rival.

The opening video for FIFA 2000 features Sol Campbell performing motion capture duties for the game, then having his likeness computer-generated to play against a retro side from 1904, the year of the inauguration of FIFA. The game also included Port Vale, the club supported by Williams, in the "Rest of the World" section (they were in the Football League First Division at the time, and while the concept of post-season promotion and relegation was introduced in this edition, teams from lower league tiers were only selectable starting with FIFA 2004).

=== 2000s ===
==== FIFA 2001 ====
- Title song: "Bodyrock" by Moby
- Cover athlete: Edgar Davids (Netherlands); Paul Scholes (UK); Gheorghe Hagi (Romania) (Turkey); Ben Olsen (US); Ricardo Sá Pinto (Portugal); Gaizka Mendieta (Spain); Filippo Inzaghi (Italy); Lothar Matthäus (Germany); Hidetoshi Nakata (Japan); Thierry Henry (France); Leonardo (Brazil); Shimon Gershon (Israel); Ko Jong-soo (South Korea)
- Released for: Windows, PlayStation 2, PlayStation
- Release date: 8 November 2000

This title had a new graphics engine from FIFA Soccer World Championship which allows each team to have its own detailed kit, and for some players, their own unique faces. Doing away with ordinary coloured pennants as club emblems, the license includes official club emblems for the first time, although certain leagues, like the Dutch league, are unlicensed. Slightly tweakable physics made the game a modding favorite for its fan community. The game also includes the entire Austrian Bundesliga and Korean K-League as playable leagues for the first time, albeit removing the Turkish Premier League. A "hack" feature is included, where the player can press R1 to attempt an intentional foul, such a high sliding tackle. This title was the first game of the series with a power bar for shooting (such a feature already existed in the Super NES version of the first game, but it was not in all versions of the game). FIFA 2001 was the first version (for the PC) that could be played online, which was revolutionary, and the first game in the franchise on a 6th generation video game console in USA and Europe.

The PlayStation version of FIFA 2001 received a "Gold" sales award from the Entertainment and Leisure Software Publishers Association (ELSPA), indicating sales of at least 200,000 copies in the United Kingdom.

==== FIFA Football 2002 ====
- Title song: "19-2000 (Soulchild Remix)" by Gorillaz
- Cover athlete: Hidetoshi Nakata (Japan); Thierry Henry (France, UK, USA); Zlatan Ibrahimović (Sweden); Nuno Gomes (Portugal); Francesco Totti (Italy); Ruud van Nistelrooy (Netherlands); İlhan Mansız (Turkey); Gerald Asamoah (Germany); Lampros Choutos (Greece); Hong Myung-bo (South Korea); Sibusiso Zuma (South Africa & Denmark); Nawaf Al-Temyat (Saudi Arabia); Tomasz Radzinski (US); Roberto Carlos (Brazil); Iker Casillas (Spain); Tomasz Frankowski (Poland); Haim Revivo (Israel)
- Released for: Windows, PlayStation 2, GameCube, PlayStation
- Release date: 1 November 2001

For FIFA Football 2002, power bars for passes were introduced, and dribbling reduced in order to attain a higher challenge level. The power bar can also be customised to suit the gamer's preference. The game also includes club emblems for many more European clubs as well as for major Dutch clubs such as PSV, Ajax and Feyenoord, although there was no Dutch league of any kind (they were under the "Rest of World" header). This game also features, for the first time, the Swiss Super League, at the cost of excluding the Greek League. A card reward system licensed from Panini was also introduced where, after winning a particular competition, a star player card is unlocked. There is also a bonus game with the nations that had automatically qualified for the 2002 World Cup (France, Japan and South Korea), in which the player tries to improve the FIFA ranking of their chosen team by participating in international friendlies. Playing with other national teams will allow the player to play through their respective zones' qualifying rounds (except for Oceania and Africa, whose confederations are not represented in full).

FIFA Football 2002 was the final game in the main series to feature the Japanese national team, as the Japan Football Association would sell its exclusive rights to Konami during 2002, thereby depriving not only FIFA, but all other football games in the market (with the exception of EA's World Cup spin-offs), from using its lineup and likeness (Japanese players in foreign markets continued to be featured in the series, though) until FIFA 17.

==== FIFA Football 2003 ====
- Cover athlete: Roberto Carlos, Ryan Giggs, and Edgar Davids (in the United States, only Landon Donovan appeared)
- Title song: "To Get Down (Fatboy Slim remix)" by Timo Maas
- Released for: Windows, PlayStation 2, Xbox, GameCube, PlayStation, Game Boy Advance, Mobile phone
- Release date: 5 November 2002

FIFA Football 2003 added features completely new gameplay from the previous titles. EA revamped the outdated DirectX 7 graphics used in FIFA 2001 and 2002, and introduced new graphics featuring more detailed stadia, players, and kits. Club Championship Mode was introduced with the feature of playing against 17 of Europe's top clubs in their own stadia and the fans singing their unique chants and songs. A TV-style broadcast package gave highlights at half-time and full-time, as well as comprehensive analysis. One of the most anticipated new features was EA Sport's "Freestyle Control" which allows the user to flick the ball on and lay it off to teammates. Other additions include greater likenesses of players such as Thierry Henry and Ronaldinho, as well as realistic player responses. An Xbox version was added to the Windows and PlayStation 2, whereas the original PlayStation version was dropped. FIFA Football 2003 was also the first game in the series to use the EA Trax. EA Trax is the exclusive music menu system that has been used ever since in all FIFA titles.

==== FIFA Football 2004 ====
- Cover athlete: Thierry Henry, Alessandro Del Piero and Ronaldinho
- Title song: "Red Morning Light" by Kings of Leon
- Released for: Windows, PlayStation 2, Xbox, GameCube, PlayStation, Game Boy Advance, Nokia N-Gage, Mobile phone
- Release date: 18 October 2003

While not adding much to the game engine, the biggest new inclusion in FIFA Football 2004 is secondary divisions, which allow the player to take lower ranked teams into the top leagues and competitions (a promotion/relegation system was present since the 2000 edition, but none up until this one featured second-tier leagues). Taking advantage of this, Season Mode was revamped into Career Mode, which became a mainstay of the series. A new gameplay feature dubbed "off the ball" was introduced, which is the ability to simultaneously control two players, in order, for example, to move a second player into the box in anticipation of a pass. The online mode was touted as the main feature. Another key feature is "Football Fusion", which allows owners of both FIFA 2004 and Total Club Manager 2004 to play games from TCM in FIFA 2004. This is also the first FIFA game to feature Latin American club teams aside from those of the Brazilian League; there are four from Mexico (América, Toluca, Monterrey and UNAM; a fifth team, Tigres UANL, is present only in the Game Boy Advance version) and two from Argentina (Boca Juniors and River Plate). The title sequence, featuring Ronaldinho, Thierry Henry and Alessandro Del Piero, was filmed at St James' Park, the home ground of Newcastle United.

==== FIFA Football 2005 ====
- Cover athlete: Patrick Vieira, Fernando Morientes and Andriy Shevchenko (in North America, Oswaldo Sánchez replaced Patrick Vieira)
- Released for: Windows, PlayStation 2, Xbox, GameCube, PlayStation, PlayStation Portable (America only), Game Boy Advance, Nokia N-Gage, Gizmondo, Mobile phone
- Release date: 11 October 2004

FIFA Football 2005 was released much earlier than the usual late October date to obtain a head start over Pro Evolution Soccer 4 and avoid clashing with EA Sports' own FIFA Street. The game features the return of the create-a-player mode, as well as an improved Career mode. The biggest difference compared to previous titles in the series is the inclusion of first-touch gameplay which provides gamers with the ability to perform real-life tricks and passes. It is also the first version to feature the full Mexican League. The game has no opening video, but its soundtrack is headlined by British DJ Paul Oakenfold, who composed the FIFA Theme especially for the game, using some sounds from the game such as artificial crowd noise and commentary. This was the last title released for the original PlayStation in the US. The game also features authentic crowd chants edited by producer Dan Motut.

==== FIFA 06 ====
- Cover athlete: Wayne Rooney and Ronaldinho (in North America, Omar Bravo and Freddy Adu joined Ronaldinho on the cover)
- Released for: GameCube, Windows, Nintendo DS, PlayStation 2, Xbox, Game Boy Advance, PlayStation Portable, Xbox 360
- Release date: 4 October 2005

FIFA's developers made a complete overhaul of the game engine for this installment of FIFA, claiming a dramatic increase in the control of play, having rewritten more than half the game's code. In addition to a renovation of the engine, which discards the "off the ball" system, the developers boasted a significantly more involved Career mode and the introduction of "team chemistry" which determines how well team members play together. This installment breaks with the long tradition of commentary from Match of the Day's John Motson and (more recently) Ally McCoist, who are replaced by ITV's Clive Tyldesley and former Sky Sports pundit Andy Gray, who had already worked in the series as guest commentator.

One of the new features in FIFA 06 was a special "retro" which features nostalgia of the game. Inside it includes an unlockable classic biographies section, a memorable moments video compilation, which features ten of the most memorable moments as judged by the FIFA 06 developers, a video compilation with a retrospective view of every game in the FIFA series and the chance to play the first ever game in the FIFA series which was titled as "FIFA 94". The game also features for the first time a Classic XI team consisting of great football legends and a World XI team consisting of current great superstars. Both teams have the Cardiff Millennium Stadium as their primary ground. These clubs must be unlocked in the "Fan Shop".

The Xbox 360 version, titled FIFA 06: Road to FIFA World Cup, featured only national teams and a brand-new engine taking advantage of the Xbox 360's graphical capabilities. It was the first FIFA game on a seventh-generation console.

==== FIFA 07 ====
- Slogans: This Is The Season
- Cover athlete: Wayne Rooney and Ronaldinho (worldwide); Ronaldinho and Lukas Podolski (Germany); Ronaldinho, Landon Donovan and Francisco Fonseca (North America); Ronaldinho and Juninho Pernambucano (France); Ronaldinho and David Villa (Spain); Kim Nam-il (South Korea)
- Released for: Windows, Xbox 360, PlayStation 2, Xbox, GameCube, PlayStation Portable, Nintendo DS, Game Boy Advance, Java ME
- Release date: 25 September 2006

The main differences from the previous game are a new "Interactive Leagues" function, new stadia such as the new Wembley Stadium and Emirates Stadium, and the ability to create custom teams and Süper Lig returns after seven years of absence from the series. The game's front-end and graphics engine remain largely the same. The Xbox 360 version, now a full-fledged conversion of the game, uses a completely new game engine which was created from scratch for the system. This Xbox 360 version also features a much reduced team line-up, completely removing all lower division teams and focusing on the four main European leagues, plus the Mexican Clausura and national teams. This was the last title released for the GameCube, Xbox and Game Boy Advance.

==== FIFA 08 ====
- Slogans: Can You FIFA 08?
- Cover athlete: Wayne Rooney and Ronaldinho (worldwide); Ronaldinho and Miroslav Klose (Germany); Ronaldinho and Sergio Ramos (Spain); Ronaldinho, Jozy Altidore and Guillermo Ochoa (North America); Ronaldinho and Ebi Smolarek (Poland);
- Title song: "Sketches (20 Something Life)" by La Rocca
- Released for: Windows, Xbox 360, PlayStation 3, Wii, PlayStation 2, PlayStation Portable, Nintendo DS, Java ME
- Release date: 27 September 2007

FIFA 08 introduced a new game mode called "Be a Pro", in which the player controls only a single player on the field. This version also introduced a larger club section including the League of Ireland, and the Hyundai A-League of Australia, for the first time. Unlike FIFA 06 and 07 however, FIFA 08 does not include any memorable moments or season highlights. This edition introduced the Practice Arena Feature that allowed training and improving the dribbling, shooting, or practicing free kicks and penalties while on the practice pitch.

It was the first game in the franchise for PlayStation 3 and Wii, the latter introducing motion controls for shooting, as well as three mini-games that make use of the Wii Remote.

==== FIFA 09 ====
- Slogans: Are You Ready for FIFA 09?
- Cover athlete: Wayne Rooney and Ronaldinho (worldwide); Ronaldinho and Petr Čech (Czech Republic); Wayne Rooney and Sergio Ramos (Spain); Ronaldinho and Kevin Kuranyi (Germany); Ronaldinho and Balázs Dzsudzsák (Hungary); Ronaldinho and Daniele De Rossi (Italy); Ronaldinho, Maurice Edu and Guillermo Ochoa (North America)
- Released for: Windows, PlayStation 3, Xbox 360, Wii, PlayStation 2, PlayStation Portable, Nintendo DS, Java ME, Zeebo
- Release date: 3 October 2008

FIFA 09 features a revamped collision system and an option for 10 versus 10 "Be a Pro" online matches, and the new "Adidas Live Season" feature, which updates all the players' stats in a particular league based on the player's form in real life. Although the feature is activated through microtransactions, gamers have access to one free league of their choice from the moment they activate the service to the end of the 2008–09 season. Online play has also been improved in FIFA 09, with a feature called "FIFA 09 Clubs" allowing players to form or join clubs and field their strongest team online. The game is the first in the FIFA series to feature user-controlled goal celebrations. FIFA 09 was met with generally positive reception from reviewers.

Clive Tyldesley and Andy Gray again provide the commentary in the English version. However, in the PS3 and Xbox 360 versions of the game, Tyldesley is replaced by Martin Tyler. For the first time, users can also purchase extra commentator voices in different languages from the PlayStation Store (PlayStation 3) and Xbox Live Marketplace (Xbox 360). Another option for the English language is Tyldesley and Andy Townsend.

=== 2010s ===
==== FIFA 10 ====
- Slogans: Let's FIFA 10
- Cover athlete: Theo Walcott, Frank Lampard and Wayne Rooney (UK); Wayne Rooney and Tim Cahill (Australia); Wayne Rooney and Andreas Ivanschitz (Austria); Wayne Rooney and Balázs Dzsudzsák (Hungary), Wayne Rooney and Robert Lewandowski (Poland); Ronaldinho and Giorgio Chiellini (Italy); Karim Benzema, Steve Mandanda and Guillaume Hoarau (France); Wayne Rooney and Bastian Schweinsteiger (Germany); Frank Lampard and Simão (Portugal); Karim Benzema and Xavi (Spain); Frank Lampard; Sacha Kljestan and Cuauhtémoc Blanco (North America); Sergei Semak (Russia)
- Released for: Windows, Xbox 360, PlayStation 3, Wii, PlayStation 2, PlayStation Portable, Nintendo DS, iOS, Android, Java ME
- Release date: 2 October 2009 (Europe), 20 October 2009 (USA)

FIFA 10 has an extended Manager Mode which includes a new Assistant Manager that can be used to take care of the team's line-up and to rotate the squad based on importance of the upcoming match and improved finances. The "Player Experience and Growth System" has changed. Player growth will now be determined by in-game performance, demands placed on the player, and achievements based on the player's particular position. The games also features 50 stadia and 31 leagues, among which the Russian Premier League is introduced to the series (except for the PlayStation 3 and Xbox 360 versions). It also includes 360 degrees player control instead of the 8-direction control in previous games.

==== FIFA 11 ====
- Slogans: We Are 11
- Cover athlete : Kaká (World), Wayne Rooney (United Kingdom, Republic of Ireland & Australia), Mesut Özil & René Adler (Germany), Tim Cahill (Australia), Jakub Błaszczykowski (Poland); Sergei Semak (Russia);
- Released for: Windows, Xbox 360, PlayStation 3, Wii, PlayStation 2, PlayStation Portable, Nintendo DS, iOS, BlackBerry OS, Java ME
- Release date: 28 September 2010 (USA), 1 October 2010 (Europe)

FIFA 11 was released 28 September 2010 in North America and 1 October 2010 in Europe. It features a new replacement to Manager Mode called Career Mode; the player is able to play a career as a Manager, Player or a new feature as a Player Manager. Other new features include an improved passing system, improved player likenesses, the ability to play as a Goalkeeper for the first time, and other various other tweaks and additions. The English commentary is provided for the fourth time by Martin Tyler and Andy Gray. Landon Donovan, Kaká and Carlos Vela feature on the cover of the North American version of the game, while Kaká and Wayne Rooney feature on the cover of the UK and Irish version. Aside from Kaká and Rooney, Petr Čech and Andrés Iniesta are also prominently featured in the game, appearing in in-game screens like the menus of the PC version.

==== FIFA 12 ====
- Slogans: Love Football, Play Football
- Cover athlete: Wayne Rooney and Jack Wilshere (UK and Republic of Ireland), Landon Donovan and Rafael Márquez (North America), Lukas Podolski and Mats Hummels (Germany), Jakub Błaszczykowski (Poland); Kaká and Vasili Berezutski (Russia);
- Released for: Windows, OS X, PlayStation 3, Xbox 360, Wii, PlayStation 2, PlayStation Vita, Nintendo 3DS, PlayStation Portable, iOS, Android, Java ME
- Release date: 27 September 2011 (USA), 30 September 2011 (Europe)

David Rutter, the line producer for FIFA 12, has promised "a revolutionary year for FIFA... especially in the gameplay department." The first screenshot was revealed on 11 April, featuring Brazilian midfielder Kaká running through the field.

FIFA 12 is the first edition of the series to feature Arabic commentary. The Czech First League and Turkish Süper Lig are removed from the game (though Turkish side Galatasaray is still featured) and a third Argentine team, Racing Club de Avellaneda, is added to the Rest of World bracket. The Xbox 360 and the PlayStation 3 were the main consoles for the game, and for the first time, the PC version was feature-identical. In May, EA announced that a Nintendo 3DS version would be available, including career mode, 11 vs 11, street mode and Be a Pro, but excluding any online mode. On 27 May, it was confirmed that FIFA 12 would be released on PlayStation 2. On 7 June, it was confirmed that the iPhone, iPad and iPod Touch will also be included and others are to come in the next few months. On 11 July, photos of the Career Mode were released. During the demo launch on 13 September 2011, both FIFA 12 and Xbox Live were trending on social networking site Twitter. For the first time in the series, the game has been officially ported to the Mac OS X operating system by TransGaming. In March 2012, FIFA Football was released as a launch title for the PS Vita, which despite the different name was a port of FIFA 12.

New features include:

- Player Impact Engine – a physics engine built to deliver real-world physicality in every interaction on the pitch
- Precision Dribbling – delivers a higher fidelity of touch on the ball for attacking players
- Tactical Defending – places equal importance on positioning, intercepting passes and tackling
- Pro Player Intelligence (only for CPU players)

==== FIFA 13 ====
- Slogans: Join the Club
- Cover athlete: Lionel Messi (World, Joe Hart and Alex Oxlade-Chamberlain also feature in the UK version), Jakub Błaszczykowski (Poland); Tim Cahill (Australia);
- Released for: Windows, Wii U, PlayStation 3, Xbox 360, Wii, PlayStation 2, PlayStation Vita, Nintendo 3DS, PlayStation Portable, iOS, Windows Phone, Java ME
- Release date: 25 September 2012 (USA), 27 September 2012 (Australia), 28 September 2012 (Europe)

On Xbox 360 and PlayStation 3, the game is the first of the series compatible with Kinect and PlayStation Move, respectively. The game also features the Saudi Professional League, the first time Arabic football is represented in the series (while FIFA 2000 did include club teams from the Arab world, it was generic teams with non-distinctive uniforms). It is the only FIFA title to be released on the Wii U.

New features include:

- Attacking Intelligence – Players automatically analyse space and think ahead making it potentially easier to break down the defence, with Goalkeeping Intelligence also improved in similar ways.
- Complete Dribbling – Precise 360-degree mobility with the ball allowing players to be more dangerous and creative during 1-on-1 confrontations.
- 1st Touch Control – Eliminates near-perfect touches for all players, allowing defenders to take advantage of the loss of focus and poor touches to win back possession.
- EA SPORTS Football Club – Earn rewards, level up, enjoy live challenges and play with friends. Rewards and items can be unlocked from EA SPORTS Catalogue and climb up to 100 levels. Support Your Club in every area of the game and play through the real-world season. The new app allows fans to connect to Ultimate Team and EA SPORTS Football Club on the game.

==== FIFA 14 ====
- Slogans: We Are FIFA 14
- Cover athlete: Lionel Messi (World), Javier Hernández (North America), Stephan El Shaarawy (Italy), Arturo Vidal and Radamel Falcao (Argentina, Chile, Panama, Venezuela), Gareth Bale (United Kingdom, Republic of Ireland), Michal Kadlec (Czech Republic), Robert Lewandowski (Poland), Balázs Dzsudzsák (Hungary), Xherdan Shaqiri (Switzerland), David Alaba (Austria), Tim Cahill (Australia), Maya Yoshida and Makoto Hasebe (Japan), Mustafa Al-Bassas (Middle East)
- Released for: Windows, PlayStation 4, Xbox One, PlayStation 3, Xbox 360, Wii, PlayStation 2, PlayStation Vita, Nintendo 3DS, PlayStation Portable, iOS, Windows Phone, Android, Java ME.
- Release date: 24 September 2013 (USA), 27 September 2013 (Europe)

For the newest generation of video game consoles, PlayStation 4 and Xbox One, the game uses a new engine, Ignite, which allows for graphical enhancements, like shifting weather conditions and dynamic environment, and for changes in gameplay, with features like Human Intelligence (which brings the AI closer to real player behavior) and True Player Motion (which gives the players more realistic animations). Also, all versions have an all-new Co-op Seasons online mode, in which two players can play a season for the same team. As for the team selection, the game features, for the first time, the top leagues from Argentina, Chile and Colombia, the first time South American leagues other than the Brazilian one are featured in a FIFA game.

The Windows version uses the Impact engine, the same as used in the PlayStation 3 and Xbox 360 versions (which the Windows versions have been using since 12), with minor improvements. This is reportedly due to Electronic Arts' claims that most PC players do not own a machine powerful enough for the Ignite engine, therefore it would only be used in the next edition. This is the last FIFA game to be released for the PlayStation Portable and FIFA 14 would eventually become the last PlayStation 2 game produced and released in South America. The game features new signature goal celebrations from a number of players including Cristiano Ronaldo, Gareth Bale and Lionel Messi, among others.

==== FIFA 15 ====
- Slogans: Feel the Game
- Cover athlete: Lionel Messi (World), Eden Hazard (United Kingdom, Republic of Ireland, France, Belgium, Netherlands), Gonzalo Higuaín (Italy), Clint Dempsey (USA), Tim Cahill (Australia), Robert Lewandowski (Poland), David Alaba (Austria), Xherdan Shaqiri (Switzerland), Javier Hernández (Mexico), Arturo Vidal (South America), Michal Kadlec (Czech Republic), Arda Turan (Turkey), Atsuto Uchida (Japan), Yahya Al-Shehri (Arabian Peninsula).
- Released for: Windows, PlayStation 3, PlayStation 4, PlayStation Vita, Nintendo 3DS, Wii, iOS, Android, Xbox 360, Xbox One, Windows Phone 8.1, Java ME
- Release date: 23 September 2014 (USA), 25 September 2014 (Europe), 26 September 2014 (UK)

This is the last title for the Wii and handhelds. The Windows version used the new engine (Ignite Engine) for the first time, which is the same as PlayStation 4 and Xbox One. The first edition released during EA's deal with the English Premier League as Official Sports Technology Partner. This deal allows all 20 Premier League stadiums to be included in the game as well as official Premier League scoreboards and television graphics. FIFA's exclusive access to Premier League clubs allowed detailed photography of all 20 stadiums so they could be authentically recreated, with the cheers, chants and sounds of more than 20 Premier League matches also recorded. Since this game any club promoted to the Premier League has had their stadium added. Due to licensing troubles with Brazilian players, this was the first game in the main series that did not feature a Brazilian league in any form. FIFA 15 also brought back the Turkish Süper Lig to the series after it was initially removed with the release of FIFA 12.

==== FIFA 16 ====
- Slogans: Play Beautiful
- Cover athlete: Lionel Messi (World), Jordan Henderson (UK and Republic of Ireland), Shinji Kagawa (Japan), David Alaba (Austria), Oscar (Brazil), Antoine Griezmann (France), Eden Hazard (Belgium), Yann Sommer (Switzerland), Juan Cuadrado (Latin America), Marco Fabián (Mexico), Steph Catley & Tim Cahill (Australia), Alex Morgan (USA), Christine Sinclair (Canada), Mauro Icardi (Italy), Arkadiusz Milik (Poland), Arda Turan (Turkey), Omar Hawsawi (Arab world), Sebastian Giovinco (USA; MLS edition)
- Released for: Windows, PlayStation 3, PlayStation 4, Xbox 360, Xbox One, iOS, Android, Java ME
- Release date: 22 September 2015 (North America), 24 September 2015 (Europe), 1 October 2015 (Brazil), 8 October 2015 (Japan)

FIFA 16 was the first title in the series to include female athletes and national teams. After the complications in the previous edition, some Brazilian teams - except for those which had exclusivity deals with Konami's rival Pro Evolution Soccer series - agreed to lend their visual identities (badges, names and kits) to the game, but no such agreement was reached with players due to the decentralization of player image rights in Brazil; as a result, the Brazilian teams are placed in the Rest of World block (being given their own incomplete league slot in subsequent editions), with their rosters comprised completely by fictional players (although real players were featured until the March 2016 updates), unlike all other clubs and most national teams.

==== FIFA 17 ====
- Slogans: Football Has Changed
- Cover athlete: Marco Reus (World, chosen by popular vote over Anthony Martial, Eden Hazard and James Rodríguez)
- Released for: Windows, PlayStation 3, PlayStation 4, Xbox 360, Xbox One
- Release date: 27 September 2016 (North America), 29 September 2016 (worldwide)

FIFA 17 is the first video game in the FIFA series to use the Frostbite game engine and also the first to implement a story mode, namely, "The Journey". It also features the Japanese J1 League for the first time, the first time ever a football game for the international market features the league.

==== FIFA 18 ====
- Slogans: More Than A Game
- Cover athlete: Cristiano Ronaldo (World), Ronaldo (Icon edition)
- Released for: Windows, PlayStation 4, Xbox One, Nintendo Switch, PlayStation 3 and Xbox 360
- Release date: 29 September 2017

FIFA 18 is the first title to feature Ultimate Team ICONS on all systems including PlayStation 4, Xbox One, Nintendo Switch, and PC. The game also features the third tier of German football, 3. Liga, the Iceland and Saudi Arabia national football teams, both the men's and women's national New Zealand teams and has the Turkish Super League after EA renewed its licence with them. EA Sports introduced Quick Subs into FIFA 18 where the player can make a substitute when the ball goes out of play. The Cruyff turn – a feint named after 1970s Dutch star Johan Cruyff – is one of the four new skills added to the game. A post-launch update for the Xbox One, PS4, Windows, and Switch versions added the 2018 FIFA World Cup, with the inclusion of World Cup Ultimate Team to the FIFA series, in which it's a separate mode from the main Ultimate Team mode.

==== FIFA 19 ====
- Slogans: Champions Rise
- Cover athlete: Cristiano Ronaldo (World), Cristiano Ronaldo and Neymar (Champions edition)
- Released for: Windows, PlayStation 4, Xbox One, Nintendo Switch, PlayStation 3 and Xbox 360.
- Release date: 28 September 2018

FIFA 19 introduces all UEFA club competitions to the game. Martin Tyler and Alan Smith return as regular commentators, while the new commentary team of Derek Rae and Lee Dixon feature in the UEFA Champions League. Composer Hans Zimmer and rapper Vince Staples recorded a new remix of the UEFA Champions League anthem specifically for FIFA 19, and it featured in the reveal trailer. The character Alex Hunter (who first appeared in FIFA 17) returns for the third and final instalment of "The Journey." The game includes the Chinese Super League, the first FIFA title to do so. The game is programmed with new kick off modes – house rule, survival mode, no rules, long range, header and volley, and first to mode.

=== 2020s ===
==== FIFA 20 ====
- Slogan: Break New Ground
- Cover athlete: Eden Hazard (Standard Edition), Virgil van Dijk (Champions Edition), and Zinedine Zidane (Ultimate Edition)
- Released for: Windows, PlayStation 4, Xbox One and Nintendo Switch.
- Release date: 27 September 2019

A new feature in FIFA 20 titled Volta Football brings back previous FIFA Street-style elements, providing a variance on the traditional Pro Clubs gameplay. It will include the ability to play 3v3 Rush (no goalkeepers), 4v4, 4v4 Rush, 5v5 and professional futsal modes. The game places an emphasis on skill and independent play, rather than tactical or team-play. The player is also able to customise their own player; aside from selecting gender, the players will also have a variety of clothes and accessories to choose from, ranging from shoes and clothes to hats and tattoos. The Pro Clubs mode has also changed, with more 1-on-1s encouraged, more off-the-ball space creation, as well as new penalty and free-kick mechanics. Juventus were not in FIFA 20 as they signed a partnership deal with PES 2020; they were called Piemonte Calcio in FIFA 20. Liverpool announced a "long-term" partnership with FIFA. Since the start of the 2020 season, EA Sports signed the deal with CONMEBOL to become the latest exclusive partner of the CONMEBOL club competitions which include the CONMEBOL Libertadores and Recopa as well as the second-tier CONMEBOL Sudamericana, available on the content update in March 2020.

==== FIFA 21 ====
- Slogan: Win As One (Windows, PS4, Xbox One, Stadia), Feel Next Level (PS5, Xbox Series X/S)
- Cover athlete: Kylian Mbappé (Standard, Champions & Ultimate Editions). Trent Alexander-Arnold, João Félix, and Erling Haaland will become three ambassadors.
- Released for: Windows, PlayStation 4, Xbox One, Nintendo Switch, PlayStation 5, Xbox Series X/S and Stadia.
- Release date: 9 October 2020

==== FIFA 22 ====
- Slogan: Powered by Football
- Cover athlete: Kylian Mbappé (Standard and Ultimate Editions)
- Released for: Windows, PlayStation 4, Xbox One, Nintendo Switch, PlayStation 5, Xbox Series X/S and Stadia.
- Release date: 1 October 2021

Following a November 2020 announcement by Canadian actor Ryan Reynolds and American actor Rob McElhenney that they would be taking over the club through the RR McReynolds Company LLC, Wrexham were included in as part of the "Rest of World" section, becoming the first ever non-League team to be featured in the series. They were last in FIFA 08 when they were relegated from League 2 to the National League. A post-launch update allows players on Xbox Series X/S, PS5 and Stadia to test out the cross-play feature as well as the inaugural UEFA Europa Conference League to the latest list of the UEFA club competitions.

==== FIFA 23 ====
- Slogan: The World's Game Powered by Football
- Cover athlete: Kylian Mbappé (Standard Edition), Sam Kerr (Standard Edition (Australasia version)), Kylian Mbappé and Sam Kerr (Ultimate Edition)
- Released for: Windows, PlayStation 4, Xbox One, Nintendo Switch, PlayStation 5, Xbox Series X/S and Stadia
- First FIFA game to feature Cross-Play
- Release date: 30 September 2022

The last game in the series under the partnership with EA Sports and FIFA, FIFA 23 features World Cup and Women's World Cup modes available post-launch. It keeps modes such as Ultimate Team and Career, and licenses to the major European leagues and players, clubs, and stadiums. This latest installment features playable women's domestic leagues for very first time in the franchise history, such as the FA Women's Super League in England, Frauen-Bundesliga in Germany, Division 1 Féminine in France and the National Women's Soccer League in the U.S. Cross-play between Xbox Series X/S, PS5, Windows, and Stadia players, as well as Xbox One and PS4 players, is supported at launch. It released on 30 September 2022. The game features fictional club AFC Richmond from the Apple TV+ series Ted Lasso. On 22 September 2023, EA Sports launched EA Sports FC, serving as the direct successor to their former FIFA series.

==== After EA ====
The games FIFA Heroes and FIFA World Cup: Launch Edition both released in 2026, as the first two FIFA games after the split with EA.

== Other titles ==
FIFA Soccer 64
The first FIFA game on the Nintendo 64 console, released in early 1997. It is similar to the 32-bit versions of FIFA 97, and was initially announced under the same title. High numbers of pre-orders for FIFA 64 led Electronic Arts to reverse its recent decision to withdraw from Nintendo 64 software development, instead announcing plans to release several EA Sports games for the Nintendo 64 over the next year.
FA Premier League Stars series
Two games, in 2000 and 2001, FIFA was based primarily around the Premier League, though localised versions of the second game were released in Germany, France, Spain and South Korea.
FIFA Soccer World Championship (FIFAサッカー ワールドチャンピオンシップ)
Released only in Japan on 25 May 2000, this PlayStation 2 exclusive, a prototype of FIFA 2001, was the first installment of the series on a 6th generation video game console. The game contains under-23 national teams like Australia national under-23 soccer team, and Japan national under-23 football team, due to Japan U-23 having qualified to the quarter-finals at the Sydney Olympics, just like a Japanese version of ISS Pro Evolution 2, but it sold only in Japan by Electronic Arts Square.
UEFA Champions League series
Two games were released in the series: UEFA Champions League 2004–2005 and UEFA Champions League 2006–2007.
FIFA Total Football (FIFAトータルフットボール)
Released in Japan in March 2004 on the PlayStation 2, it was based on FIFA 2004.
FIFA Superstars
This is a Facebook game developed for EA Sports by Playfish. The game operates on a similar premise to the "Ultimate Team" mode that appears in the main FIFA games. Users collect trading cards that represent different players; each card has a statistical rating of the player's skills, contributing to an average team skill rating. The skill rating is augmented by a "training" rating, and the combination of the two ratings gives the overall team rating. These ratings determine the outcomes of matches played by the team; a team must win a certain number of matches to progress through a series of leagues, culminating with the "Superstars" league. Users may purchase new player cards with in-game "coins", which are acquired through playing matches, winning leagues and as gifts from friends; the cards come in bronze, silver and gold packs, with bronze containing low-rated players and gold containing the best players in the game, although gold packs cost more coins. Coins may also be used to purchase training and stadium upgrades, such as training cones and seating. The game requires match credits, which can be earned by playfish cash, penalty shootouts, playing against your friends or simply waiting over time. The game was released in February 2010. The game has gone offline at the end of March 2013, with very lousy service and many user complaints on the forum.
FIFA World
A free-to-play massively multiplayer online FIFA game, this time distributed by EA Sports themselves. Based on FIFA 14, the game offers both match and FIFA Ultimate Team gameplay. Announced on 9 August 2013, an open beta was released on 12 November 2013 in Brazil and Russia, before being made globally available on 20 May 2014. The game went offline on 14 July 2015.

=== FIFA Online games ===
A series of free-to-play massively multiplayer online FIFA games specifically for the Asian market.

- FIFA Online
- FIFA Online 2
  - FIFA Online (western version)
- FIFA Online 3
  - FIFA Online 3 M
- FIFA Online 4
  - FIFA Online 4 M

=== FIFA World Cup licensed games ===
In 1997, Electronic Arts purchased the licence from FIFA to publish official FIFA World Cup video games prior to each tournament. Starting from FIFA 18, the World Cup mode was included as downloadable content inside the main game.

- World Cup 98
- World Cup '98 France: Road to Win
- 2002 FIFA World Cup
- 2006 FIFA World Cup
- 2010 FIFA World Cup South Africa
- 2014 FIFA World Cup Brazil (standalone game for PS3 and Xbox 360, but an expansion pack for FIFA 14 and FIFA Online 3)
- 2014 FIFA World Cup Brazil World-class Soccer (A collectible card game for Android and iOS which is released in Japan and mainland China only.)
- 2018 FIFA World Cup Russia (not a standalone game, but an expansion pack for FIFA 18, FIFA Mobile and FIFA Online 4)
- 2022 FIFA World Cup Qatar (not a standalone game, but an expansion pack for FIFA 23, FIFA Mobile and FIFA Online 4)
- FIFA World Cup: Launch Edition, a Netflix game made for the 2026 FIFA World Cup.
- FIFA Super Soccer, a Roblox game made by Gamefam.

=== UEFA European Championship licensed games ===
Similar to FIFA World Cup games, in 2000, EA purchased the license from UEFA to publish official European Championship video games prior to each tournament.

- UEFA Euro 2000
- UEFA Euro 2004
- UEFA Euro 2008
- UEFA Euro 2012 (not a standalone game, but an expansion pack for FIFA 12)
- UEFA Euro 2024 (not a standalone game, but an expansion pack for EA Sports FC 24)

=== UEFA Champions League licensed games ===
In 2002, EA acquired the license for the UEFA Champions League. Two games were released, in 2005 and 2007 when EA weren't due to release an international title, before Konami bought the licence in 2008. In April 2018 Konami lost the official license. In June 2018 it became official that EA bought the license for FIFA 19.

- UEFA Champions League 2004–2005
- UEFA Champions League 2006–2007
- FIFA 19
- FIFA 20
- FIFA 21
- FIFA 22
- FIFA 23
- Football Manager 2023

=== Street football games ===
FIFA Street is a spin-off franchise introduced in 2005 which focuses on flair, style and trickery, reflecting the cultures of street football and freestyle football played on the streets and backlots across the world.

- FIFA Street (2005)
- FIFA Street 2 (2006)
- FIFA Street 3 (2008)
- FIFA Street (2012)

=== Management games ===
Since 1997, EA Sports have regularly released football management games, most of which have made use of their FIFA or FA Premier League licenses in their titles. Some of these games were developed by EA themselves, though some have been developed by third parties such as Krisalis Software and Bright Future GmbH.

- FIFA Manager series
  - FIFA Soccer Manager (1997)
  - The FA Premier League Football Manager 99
  - The FA Premier League Football Manager 2000
  - The FA Premier League Football Manager 2001
  - The FA Premier League Football Manager 2002
  - Total Club Manager 2003
  - Total Club Manager 2004
  - Total Club Manager 2005
  - FIFA Manager 06
  - FIFA Manager 07
  - FIFA Manager 08
  - FIFA Manager 09
  - FIFA Manager 10
  - FIFA Manager 11
  - FIFA Manager 12
  - FIFA Manager 13
  - FIFA Manager 14

=== FIFA Mobile ===
- Cover Athlete: Marco Reus (11 October 2016 – 23 December 2016); Eden Hazard (24 December 2016 – 31 October 2017); Cristiano Ronaldo (1 November 2017 – 5 November 2018); Neymar, Paulo Dybala, Kevin De Bruyne (6 November 2018 – 26 September 2019); Virgil Van Dijk, Eden Hazard (27 September 2019 – 2020) Kylian Mbappe (2020 – 2023); Vinícius Júnior, Erling Haaland (26 September 2023 – 24 September 2024); Jude Bellingham (24 September 2024 – present)
- Released for: iOS, Android, Windows 10 Mobile
- Release date: 11 October 2016

FIFA Mobile is the first mobile game of FIFA to use the new attack mode, live events, leagues, player plans, and program packs. It features seasonal programs for players to obtain different packs and players by completing different plans, live events, and achievements. EA later reworked attack mode to VS Attack on their 6.0.1 update on 19 May 2017. Beginning 1 November 2017, a new mode called "campaign" was introduced, where players face different teams from around the world, from tiny amateur clubs to the best professional clubs in the world. The ability to improve players by "training" them was also introduced. The game also features Live Events themed on recent real world events, as well as mini games based on skills such as shooting, passing, dribbling and goalkeeping.

== FIFA English commentary ==
Commentary team
Games	Commentary team
FIFA Soccer 96	John Motson
FIFA 97	John Motson and Andy Gray
FIFA: Road to World Cup 98	John Motson and Andy Gray
FIFA 99	John Motson and Chris Waddle
FIFA 2000	John Motson and Mark Lawrenson (UK); Phil Schoen and Julie Foudy (US)
FIFA 2001	John Motson and Mark Lawrenson
FIFA Football 2002	John Motson and Andy Gray
FIFA Football 2003	John Motson and Ally McCoist
FIFA Football 2004	John Motson and Ally McCoist
FIFA Football 2005	John Motson and Ally McCoist
FIFA 06	Clive Tyldesley and Andy Gray
FIFA 06: Road to FIFA World Cup	Martin Tyler and Andy Gray
FIFA 07	Clive Tyldesley or Martin Tyler and Andy Gray
FIFA 08	Clive Tyldesley or Martin Tyler and Andy Gray
FIFA 09	Clive Tyldesley or Martin Tyler and Andy Gray
FIFA 10	Clive Tyldesley or Martin Tyler and Andy Gray
FIFA 11	Clive Tyldesley or Martin Tyler and Andy Gray
FIFA 12	Martin Tyler and Alan Smith & Clive Tyldesley and Andy Townsend
FIFA 13	Martin Tyler and Alan Smith & Clive Tyldesley and Andy Townsend
FIFA 14	Martin Tyler and Alan Smith & Clive Tyldesley and Andy Townsend
FIFA 15	Martin Tyler and Alan Smith & Clive Tyldesley and Andy Townsend
FIFA 16	Martin Tyler and Alan Smith & Clive Tyldesley and Andy Townsend
FIFA 17	Martin Tyler and Alan Smith & Clive Tyldesley and Andy Townsend
FIFA 18	Martin Tyler and Alan Smith
FIFA 19	Martin Tyler and Alan Smith & Derek Rae and Lee Dixon
FIFA 20	Martin Tyler and Alan Smith & Derek Rae and Lee Dixon
FIFA 21	Derek Rae and Lee Dixon
FIFA 22	Derek Rae and Stewart Robson
FIFA 23	Derek Rae and Stewart Robson

== See also ==
- Pro Evolution Soccer
- List of best-selling video game franchises
