= FIFA 08 =

2007 video game

- British and Irish cover featuring Manchester United's Wayne Rooney and Barcelona's Ronaldinho
- Developer: EA Canada
- Publisher: EA Sports
- Designers: Joe Booth; Jonathan Gallina; Darren Hedges; David Hoffmann; Kaz Makita; Gary Paterson; Jamie Toghill
- Series: FIFA
- Platforms: Microsoft Windows Consoles: Xbox 360 Wii PlayStation 2 PlayStation 3; Handhelds: PlayStation Portable Nintendo DS N-Gage 2.0 Java ME
- Release: AU: 27 September 2007; EU: 28 September 2007; NA: 8 October 2007 (PSP); NA: 9 October 2007; JP: 29 October 2007
- Genre: Sports
- Modes: Single-player, multiplayer

FIFA 08 (titled FIFA Soccer 08 in North America) is a football simulation video game developed by EA Canada and published by Electronic Arts under the EA Sports label. It was released on all popular gaming formats in September 2007 in Europe, Australia and Asia, and in October 2007 in North America. The PlayStation 3 and Xbox 360 versions of the game feature an improved game engine with superior graphics and different commentators and are dubbed "next-generation" by EA. On all other platforms—including the PC—the game utilizes an older engine. The Nintendo DS version features fewer teams, stadiums, game modes and kits due to the limitations of the machine's storage medium.

Commentary in the English-language version comes from Sky Sports' Martin Tyler and Andy Gray on next generation consoles. However, ITV Sport's Clive Tyldesley partners Gray on the then current generation consoles, and the PC version of the game. On the Nintendo DS version of the game, Tyldesley commentates solo. It also marked the first time the GameCube has been excluded from the FIFA lineup since FIFA 2001 and the first time the original Xbox and Game Boy Advance has been excluded from the FIFA lineup since FIFA Football 2002.

The tagline for the game is "Can You FIFA 08?". The theme song is "Sketches (20 Something Life)" by La Rocca, from the album The Truth.

== New features ==
New features that were not in FIFA 07 include "Be a Pro Mode", where the player plays as only one player (the player can be changed) throughout the entire match. However, this mode is not available for goalkeepers.

New features for the PlayStation 3 and Xbox 360 included cooperative online play and a change of controls, which features the right stick as a way of selecting which player is to be on defense. However, this control setting can be changed back to the FIFA 07 configuration as well as other preset control configurations. In addition, the online mode has a new addition with interactive leagues, where players choose a league, a team, and play against real-life opponents. While not an entirely new feature, FIFA 08 includes new trick moves that can be used by using the right analog stick, which were, for the most part, absent in FIFA 07. In general, the speed of game also has decreased in FIFA 08.

In the PlayStation 2 version of the game, two new features were added. The first being goalkeeper AI, which meant when in a one-on-one situation with a forward and goalkeeper, one could push the right analog stick and have complete control of the goalkeeper. The second of these was when taking a free kick you were able to push the R3 (right stick) to lock the position of the ball, while you used the stick to determine exactly where you wanted the free kick to go. These were two features that have not been used in any FIFA games since, although many users and fans have requested them.

== Manager Mode ==
The Manager Mode on FIFA 08 has few enhancements from its predecessor. Some of the new features include the chance to schedule training on certain dates, via the manager's calendar, and the option to play up to four pre-season friendlies.

== Leagues and teams ==
FIFA 08 includes 621 licensed teams, 43 national teams, with 30 leagues and more than 15,000 licensed players. It is the first game in the series to feature the League of Ireland. Several teams from other leagues also appear in a "Rest of World" category. Of the 621 teams that comprise the game, 29 appear unlicensed, 13 of them being national teams.

=== National teams ===
FIFA 08 has 44 teams in its international division. The most notable exclusion is Japan, who made it into the round of 16 in the 2002 World Cup, but whose licensing rights belonged to Konami at the time.

== Soundtrack ==
EA Sports officially announced FIFA 08's soundtrack on 11 September 2007. It featured many Latin music acts including Ivy Queen and Pacha Massive.

== Reception ==
Reception

Aggregate score
Aggregator	Score
Metacritic	(PC) 77/100 (PS3) 81/100 (X360) 82/100 (PS2) 83/100 (WII) 65/100 (PSP) 79/100 (DS) 77/100

Review scores
Publication	Score
GameSpot	(PS3/X360) 8.5/10 (PS2) 8/10 (WII) 6.5/10 (PSP) 7.5/10
IGN	(PC/PS3/X360) 7.9/10 (PS2) 8.7/10 (WII) 7/10 (PSP) 8.2/10
Nintendo Life	(WII) 8/10 (DS) 6/10
Nintendo World Report	(WII) 6/10 (DS) 7/10

The PlayStation 2 version of FIFA 08 received a "Double Platinum" sales award from the Entertainment and Leisure Software Publishers Association (ELSPA), indicating sales of at least 600,000 copies in the United Kingdom. ELSPA gave the Xbox 360 and PlayStation 3 releases each a "Platinum" certification, for sales of at least 300,000 copies per version in the region.

=== Awards ===
In 2008, FIFA 08 was nominated for BAFTA Children's Kids Vote Award. During the 11th Annual Interactive Achievement Awards, FIFA 08 received a nomination for "Sports Game of the Year" by the Academy of Interactive Arts & Sciences.

== See also ==
- Pro Evolution Soccer 2008, its competitor football game
