= EA Sports FC Online (series) =

FC Online
- Genre(s): Sports
- Publisher(s): Electronic Arts, Neowiz, VTC Game, NEXON, Tencent, Garena
- First release: EA Sports FIFA Online; May 25, 2006
- Latest release: EA Sports FC Online; May 17, 2018

EA Sports FC Online (formerly FIFA Online) is a series of online sports games developed by Electronic Arts (EA) based on FIFA series of games. It is released with a free-to-play model with a focus on the Asian video game market. The first entry in the series was released in May 2006.

== Series ==
Release timeline
2006	EA Sports FIFA Online
2007	EA Sports FIFA Online 2
2008
2009
2010
2011
2012	FIFA Online 3
2013
2014
2015
2016
2017
2018	EA Sports FC Online

=== EA Sports FIFA Online (2006) ===
EA Sports FIFA Online, developed as a partnership between EA and Neowiz, was released in an open beta on May 25, 2006. By June, the game had 100,000 concurrent players.

=== EA Sports FIFA Online 2 ===
EA Sports FIFA Online 2, developed by EA and Neowiz, was released in Asia on October 1, 2007. VTC Game published the game in Vietnam in 2008.

==== FIFA Online (2010) ====
A Western version of FIFA Online 2, titled FIFA Online, was developed by EA's EA Singapore and EA Canada studios.

=== FIFA Online 3 ===
A partnership between EA and NEXON for a third FIFA Online game in South Korea was announced in July 2012, with the game set to be released by NEXON later that year. Tencent published the game in China in 2013, and Garena published the game in Southeast Asia in the same year.

==== FIFA Online 3 M ====
A mobile version of the game was released for iOS and Android on May 29, 2014.

=== EA Sports FC Online (formerly FIFA Online 4) ===
FIFA Online 4 entered its open beta phase on May 17, 2018, and was released on May 17, 2018. On September 22, 2023, the game was changed as EA Sports FC Online, following the split between EA and FIFA.

==== FC Online M (formerly FIFA Online 4 M) ====
A sequel to the 2014 mobile version was released in July 2018.
