= FIFA Street 2 =

2006 video game

- Cover art featuring Manchester United's Cristiano Ronaldo
- Developers: EA Canada; HB Studios (PSP); Exient Entertainment (DS); Distinctive Developments (mobile)
- Publisher: EA Sports BIG
- Series: FIFA Street
- Platforms: GameCube; PlayStation 2; Xbox; Nintendo DS; PlayStation Portable; Mobile phone
- Release: February 28, 2006: NA: February 28, 2006; AU: February 28, 2006 (PSP); EU: March 3, 2006; AU: March 6, 2006 (PS2, Xbox) Mobile phone; EU: July 2006
- Genre: Sports (street football)
- Modes: Single-player, multiplayer

FIFA Street 2 is the 2006 sequel to the EA Sports video game FIFA Street. A new "trick stick beat" system was introduced and new authentic tricks were also introduced. The game was released for the GameCube, PlayStation 2, Xbox, PlayStation Portable, Nintendo DS, and mobile phones. The player on the game cover is Portugal international Cristiano Ronaldo.

The home console editions of the game received average reviews for the improvements on the first FIFA Street. However, the hand-held versions, particularly on the DS, were received poorly for not including those innovations.

== Gameplay ==
Gameplay of FIFA Street 2. Each team's score in points is at the top of the frame, and the score in goals at the bottom.

The game is a street soccer game in which the player can take control of 4-a-side versions of national football teams in matches where the object is to win by scoring a set number of goals or points via tricks, or within a time limit. In the career mode "Rule the Streets", one creates a player and competes in tournaments around the world to obtain "Skill Bills" to buy clothing and upgrade his rating. As the player improves, he can captain his own street soccer team and eventually become an international. The best players have special moves often named after their nickname.

Legends of soccer such as Zico, Carlos Alberto Torres and Abedi Pele are unlockable during the game.

The game has its own in-game radio station, presented by Zane Lowe formerly of BBC Radio 1 and featuring music by artists such as Roots Manuva, Sway, Pendulum, Editors and The Subways.

== Reception ==
Reception

Aggregate score
Aggregator	Score
Metacritic	(Xbox) 63 / 100 (GC) 63 / 100 (PS2) 59 / 100 (PSP) 58 / 100 (DS) 43 / 100

Review scores
Publication	Score
Eurogamer	6 / 10
Game Informer	6 / 10
GamePro	2.5/5
GameRevolution	C−
GameSpot	7.5 / 10 (PSP) 5.8 / 10 (DS) 3.6 / 10
GameSpy	2.5/5 (PSP) 2/5 (DS) 1.5/5
GameZone	7 / 10
IGN	(PSP) 6.2 / 10; 6 / 10 (DS) 4.8 / 10
Nintendo Power	(GC) 7 / 10 (DS) 6 / 10
Official U.S. PlayStation Magazine	2.5/5
Official Xbox Magazine (US)	6 / 10
The A.V. Club	B
The Times	3/5

The game received "mixed" reviews on all platforms except the DS version, which received "unfavorable" reviews, according to video game review aggregator Metacritic.

The A.V. Club gave the game a B and stated, "Defending against tricks can be like a clumsy piece of physical comedy. When you aren't paralyzed, you fall flat on your face." However, The Times gave the PS2 and Xbox versions three stars out of five and said that it "falls down in one vital aspect — namely[,] the art of defending."
