= FIFA Football 2005 =

2004 video game

- British and Irish cover art with (left to right) Arsenal's Patrick Vieira, Real Madrid's Fernando Morientes and Milan's Andriy Shevchenko
- Developers: EA Canada; Exient Entertainment (GBA, N-Gage, Gizmondo)
- Publisher: EA Sports
- Series: FIFA
- Platforms: Windows, PlayStation, PlayStation 2, GameCube, Xbox, Game Boy Advance, PlayStation Portable, N-Gage, Gizmondo, Mobile phone
- Release: 8 October 2004: Game Boy Advance, GameCube, PS2, Windows, Xbox; EU: 8 October 2004; NA/AU: 12 October 2004 PlayStation; NA: 12 October 2004; PAL: 15 October 2004 Mobile; NA: 23 October 2004 N-Gage; PAL: 27 October 2004; NA: 10 November 2004 PlayStation Portable; NA: 25 April 2005 Gizmondo; PAL: 15 September 2005; NA: 22 October 2005
- Genre: Sports
- Modes: Single-player, multiplayer

FIFA Football 2005, also known as FIFA Soccer 2005 in North America, is a football simulation video game released in 2004. It was developed by EA Canada and published by Electronic Arts. It was released for the PlayStation, PlayStation 2, Microsoft Windows, Xbox, PlayStation Portable (as simply FIFA Soccer), GameCube, mobile phone, Gizmondo, N-Gage and the Game Boy Advance. The tagline for the game was: "A great player needs a great first touch". FIFA 2005 is the twelfth game in the FIFA series, the ninth in 3D and the final game in the series for the PlayStation. FIFA Football 2005 marks the first time to include the seventh-generation handheld game consoles. The Japanese version of the game went by the name of FIFA Total Football 2 and was released on 9 December 2004. FIFA Football 2005 is the last licensed game to be released for the PlayStation in North America.

== Gameplay ==
Improving the career mode, the game was extensively advertised and released much sooner than the usual late October dates to avoid proximity with the release of Pro Evolution Soccer 4 and the EA Big release FIFA Street.

The game featured a return of create-a-player mode, as well as an improved, 15-season-long career mode. The game's biggest difference compared to previous titles was the inclusion of first-touch gameplay which provided gamers the ability to perform real-life tricks and passes. It was also the first version to feature the full Mexican League, which boosted sales in the United States. The soundtrack was headlined by British DJ Paul Oakenfold, who composed the "FIFA Theme" especially for the game. The soundtrack was Faithless, Ivete Sangalo, Marcelo D2, Oomph!, Scissor Sisters and Seeed.

The main cover for the game featured Patrick Vieira, Fernando Morientes and Andriy Shevchenko. On the North American cover Oswaldo Sánchez replaced Vieira.

John Motson provides commentary with Ally McCoist on special comments in the English version of the game.

In most territories, FIFA 2005 was the last game to release on the PlayStation console.

The game's online servers were closed some time before August 1, 2007.

== Reception ==
Reception

Aggregate scores
Aggregator	Score						
Aggregator	GBA	GameCube	N-Gage	PC	PS2	PSP	Xbox
GameRankings	82%	80.99%	77.90%	78.25%	81.46%	74.36%	82.07%
Metacritic	75/100	78/100	79/100	77/100	81/100	73/100	81/100

Review scores
Publication	Score						
Publication	GBA	GameCube	N-Gage	PC	PS2	PSP	Xbox
Electronic Gaming Monthly	N/A	8.33/10	N/A	N/A	8.33/10	7.83/10	8.33/10
Eurogamer	N/A	N/A	N/A	N/A	N/A	N/A	8/10
Game Informer	N/A	7.75/10	N/A	N/A	7.75/10	8.25/10	7.75/10
GamePro	N/A	N/A	N/A	N/A	4.5/5	N/A	4.5/5
GameRevolution	N/A	B	N/A	N/A	B	N/A	B
GameSpot	N/A	8.6/10	8.2/10	8.9/10	8.8/10	8.3/10	8.9/10
GameSpy	N/A	3.5/5	N/A	3/5	4/5	4/5	4/5
GameZone	8/10	9/10	N/A	9/10	9/10	8.2/10	9/10
IGN	N/A	8.6/10	N/A	8.6/10	8.6/10	7/10	8.6/10
Nintendo Power	3.7/5	4.2/5	N/A	N/A	N/A	N/A	N/A
Official U.S. PlayStation Magazine	N/A	N/A	N/A	N/A	5/5	4/5	N/A
Official Xbox Magazine (US)	N/A	N/A	N/A	N/A	N/A	N/A	8.4/10
PC Gamer (US)	N/A	N/A	N/A	83%	N/A	N/A	N/A

According to Electronic Arts, FIFA Football 2005 sold above 4.5 million units worldwide by the end of 2004.

The PlayStation 2 version of FIFA Football 2005 received a "Double Platinum" sales award from the Entertainment and Leisure Software Publishers Association (ELSPA), indicating sales of at least 600,000 copies in the United Kingdom.

The game was met with positive to average reception. GameRankings and Metacritic gave it a score of 85.33% for the Mobile version; 82.07% and 81 out of 100 for the Xbox version; 82% and 75 out of 100 for the Game Boy Advance version; 81.46% and 81 out of 100 for the PlayStation 2 version; 80.99% and 78 out of 100 for the GameCube version; 78.25% and 77 out of 100 for the PC version; 77.90% and 79 out of 100 for the N-Gage version; and 74.36% and 73 out of 100 for the PSP version.

GameSpot gave the Mobile version a score of 8.4 out of 10 and said, "It doesn't supersede the console versions in any way, but the fact that it comes reasonably close says a lot about the quality of this game as well as about how far mobile gaming has come along." IGN gave the same version 7.5 out of 10 and called it "unnecessarily hard". It received a runner-up placement in GameSpot's 2004 "Best N-Gage Game" award category, losing to Colin McRae Rally 2005.
