= EA Sports FC Online =

2018 video game

- Developer: EA Spearhead
- Publishers: Nexon (Korea); Garena (Thailand and Vietnam); Tencent Gaming (China)
- Directors: 1st: Park Jung-moo; 2nd: Park Sang-won
- Series: FIFA, FIFA Online; EA Sports FC
- Engine: Ignite
- Platforms: Microsoft Windows iOS; Android
- Release: KOR: 17 May 2018; THA: 12 June 2018; VIE: 14 June 2018; CHN: 11 June 2018
- Genres: Sports, football simulation
- Modes: Single-player, multiplayer

EA Sports FC Online (formerly known as FIFA Online 4) is a free-to-play massively multiplayer online football game developed by EA Spearhead and published by Nexon, Garena and Tencent. The game was released on 17 May 2018 in South Korea, then for China, Thailand and Vietnam markets in the following month.

== Development ==
In December 2017, the first closed beta test was launched, and plenty have been held. In South Korea, it was released into open beta on 17 May 2018. In Vietnam, the closed beta test started on 22 March 2018.

=== EA Sports FC Online M ===
In July 2018, EA Sports FC Online M (formerly FIFA Online 4 M) was released in Korea for iOS and Android. It is a mobile version and sequel to FIFA Online 3 M. It was later released in November 2018 in Vietnam and Thailand.

=== FIFA license ===
With the announcement that FIFA would no longer be licensing its name and brand to EA, Nexon assured fans that the end of the partnership would not affect the service of the game on both PC and mobile. On 22 September 2023, FIFA Online 4 was updated to rebranding name EA Sports FC Online, following the split between EA and FIFA.

== Gameplay ==
The game engine is not part of the Frostbite engine series because of hardware requirements. EA Sports FC Online is mostly based on FIFA 16 which runs on the Ignite Engine and incorporates animations and other components from FIFA 18. The gameplay and AI engine are from FIFA 17.

The game allows players to play regular matches with 2v2 or 3v3 matches like the main series as well as the Ultimate Team feature seen in other games. The game allows the ability to buy players from a marketplace and help build their stats by purchasing items. FC Online have several updates of game modes for the next seasons following the next traditional FC (previously FIFA) games such as House Rules from FIFA 19, UEFA Champions League and VOLTA Live, which was the online version of VOLTA Football from FIFA 20, as well as PlayStyles in EA Sports FC 24.

== Game mode ==
=== World Cup and UEFA Euro Modes ===
On 24 May 2018, the "World Cup Mode" was announced to be released on 31 May 2018. Two new game modes were introduced, Vs Com FIFA World Cup and Vs User 16 Tournaments. The group stage mode is against computer, while the knockout stage mode are against other players.

This "World Cup Mode" was returned on 31 October 2022 following 2022 FIFA World Cup.

When the game was renamed as EA Sports FC Online, the mode was renamed as "UEFA Euro Mode" on 31 May 2024 following UEFA Euro 2024.

=== League game mode ===
In league mode, the player selects a club and play the league in which that club belongs. It is a classic content that has existed since its previous work.

=== House Rules ===
House Rules is a mode that firstly appeared in a 2019 roster update. This mode was similar to the same name mode that firstly appeared in FIFA 19, in which it offer unique and customizable match types with various rule alterations, including "No Rules", "Survival", "Long Range", "First to...", and "Headers & Volleys". These modes allow players to tailor their gameplay experience with custom win conditions, scoring rules, and even the removal of standard game mechanics like offsides and fouls.

=== VOLTA Live ===
VOLTA Live is a street/futsal football mode that firstly appeared in a 2020 roster update. This mode was the multiplayer version of VOLTA Football that firstly appeared in FIFA 20.

While the VOLTA Football was replaced by Rush Mode since EA Sports FC 25, the VOLTA Live mode was still retained in the latest update of EA Sports FC Online.

== Reception ==
As of 2022, FIFA Online 4 is the fifth-most popular esport in South Korea.

== See also ==
- EA Sports FC Mobile: mobile version, also published by Nexon, Garena and Tencent in several Asian countries.
