= FIFA Street (2005 video game) =

2005 video game

- North American cover art with FC Barcelona's Ronaldinho
- Developer: EA Canada
- Publisher: EA Sports BIG
- Series: FIFA Street
- Platforms: PlayStation 2, Xbox, GameCube
- Release: NA: February 22, 2005; PAL: March 11, 2005; KOR: March 24, 2005 (PS2); JP: July 21, 2005 (PS2)
- Genre: Sports (Football)
- Modes: Single-player, Multiplayer

FIFA Street is a sports video game developed by EA Canada and published by Electronic Arts under the EA Sports BIG label. It is commentated on by MC Harvey of the So Solid Crew. It was released in February 2005 for PlayStation 2, Xbox, and GameCube. The cover features Brazilian international footballer Ronaldinho.

It was followed by FIFA Street 2, which was released in February 2006.

== Gameplay ==
The game is a spin-off of EA's FIFA series of football games, following the same formula as their other "Street" titles, NFL Street and NBA Street, by reducing the more complete version of the game into a simpler arcade style game. It focuses on flair, style and trickery, as opposed to what FIFA Football focuses on team play and tactics, reflecting the culture of freestyle football played in the streets and backlots across the world. Using reputation and respect gained from playing 4-on-4 games with tricks and flair, the aim of FIFA Street is to build a team up of well-known and recognised players including Ronaldo and Ronaldinho to progress through street venues across the world.

== Reception ==
Reception

Aggregate score
Aggregator	Score		
Aggregator	GameCube	PS2	Xbox
Metacritic	60 / 100	59 / 100	60 / 100

Review scores
Publication	Score		
Publication	GameCube	PS2	Xbox
Electronic Gaming Monthly	6.5 / 10	6.5 / 10	6.5 / 10
Eurogamer	N/A	N/A	8 / 10
Game Informer	6.5 / 10	6.5 / 10	6.5 / 10
GamePro	N/A	3.5/5	3.5/5
GameSpot	6.5 / 10	6.7 / 10	6.7 / 10
GameSpy	2/5	2/5	2/5
GameZone	6.5 / 10	5.5 / 10	6 / 10
IGN	5.5 / 10	5.5 / 10	5.5 / 10
Nintendo Power	3.3 / 5	N/A	N/A
Official U.S. PlayStation Magazine	N/A	2.5/5	N/A
Official Xbox Magazine (US)	N/A	N/A	5.4 / 10
Cube	4.1/10	N/A	N/A
Detroit Free Press	N/A	2/4	N/A

The game received "mixed" reviews on all platforms according to video game review aggregator Metacritic.

The PlayStation 2 version of FIFA Street received a "Platinum" sales award from the Entertainment and Leisure Software Publishers Association (ELSPA), indicating sales of at least 300,000 copies in the United Kingdom.
