= Clive Tyldesley =

English television sports broadcaster

Clive Tyldesley OBE
- Born: 21 August 1954 (age 72); Radcliffe, Lancashire, England
- Occupation: Football commentator
- Employers: Former: Radio Trent (1975–1977); Radio City (1977–1989); Granada Television (1989–1992); BBC Sport (1992–1996); ITV Sport (1998–2024); Current: CBS Sports (2020–present); Rangers TV (2020–present)

Clive Robert Tyldesley (born 21 August 1954) is an English television sports broadcaster. He was ITV's senior football commentator from 1998 until 2020. In that role, he led the ITV commentary team at five World Cups and five European Championships and was lead commentator on seventeen UEFA Champions League finals and nine FA Cup finals for ITV.

He currently serves as the lead commentator for CBS/Paramount Plus live UEFA Champions League coverage in the United States.

In 2021, his first book was published by Headline: the semi-autobiographical Not for me, Clive. He was appointed Officer of the Order of the British Empire (OBE) in the 2026 New Year Honours for services to Sports Broadcasting and to Charity.

== Radio ==
Tyldesley's career began as a teaboy at Nottingham's Radio Trent in 1975, joining the sports team within weeks, and began covering Brian Clough's Nottingham Forest.

In the spring of 1977, he joined Radio City in Liverpool, eventually becoming head of sport. Tyldesley commentated on four European Cup finals involving Liverpool, reporting live on the Heysel Stadium disaster before the final in 1985.

Tyldesley also chronicled Everton's successes in the mid-1980s and reported extensively on the aftermath of the Hillsborough disaster.

== Early television career ==
Tyldesley's first television opportunity came during the 1986 FIFA World Cup at ITV, when the producers decided a London-based standby commentator was required should any technical problems occur. During their first live match between Brazil and Spain, the connection to the commentators in Guadalajara went down and host Brian Moore handled the commentary from London.

Tyldesley did record a commentary on the match, but failed to notice that a Spanish shot that hit the underside of the bar and crossed the line had not been given as a goal and did not realise that a Brazilian goal had been disallowed. He reported that the half-time score was 1–1 rather than 0–0 and, having prepared for a month away, was sent home the following day.

In 1987, he began to work on Sportsweek, a late-night Granada Television sports programme featuring Elton Welsby and Robert McCaffrey. During the next two years, Tyldesley began to split his working time between Radio City and Granada.

His television commentary debut came in May 1988, covering an indoor football tournament in Australia which was broadcast on ITV. Tyldesley also commentated on the 1989 FIFA U-16 World Championship for Eurosport.

Tyldesley joined Granada full-time in 1989, initially as a reporter and occasional presenter on their Kick Off and Granada Soccer Night programmes before succeeding Martin Tyler as their main football commentator in 1990. He was also a regular voice on rugby league, with Granada beginning live coverage of the Stones Bitter Championship that season.

Tyldesley's first ITV football commentary was on the opening day of the 1989-90 season, covering Liverpool's victory over Manchester City at Anfield. This was five weeks prior to the match often described as his television debut, Manchester City's 5–1 win over Manchester United in September 1989.

Granada also utilised Tyldesley as a presenter and commentator in their coverage of Roses cricket, whilst he became part of the ITV network team as a reporter on Saint and Greavsie. Tyldesley's first network football commentaries came at the 1990 World Cup.

Screensport hired Tyldesley to commentate on live coverage of the 1991 Copa América and 1992 African Cup of Nations. His first live ITV commentary was in October 1991, when a dispute between Atlético Madrid and a Spanish TV company knocked their match with Manchester United off the air and second half coverage of Tottenham Hotspur v FC Porto was shown instead.

Tyldesley's final work for ITV during his first spell was as a reporter and standby commentator at UEFA Euro 1992.

== BBC (1992–1996) ==
Tyldesley received an offer to join the BBC's sports department in London in the summer of 1992, a need for new voices driven by the return of Match Of The Day to a weekly slot after the acquisition of rights to show highlights of the new Premier League.

He made his BBC debut on the opening day of the 1992-93 season, reporting on the match between Everton and Sheffield Wednesday for Match of the Day. The first match commentary Tyldesley delivered was on 5th September 1992, covering Queen's Park Rangers v Ipswich Town.

For the next four years, Tyldesley would contribute commentaries and reports across the BBC's football output, working at the 1994 World Cup, the 1995 FIFA Women's World Cup and the 1996 European Championship as a commentator.

Because of the pre-eminence of John Motson and Barry Davies, he only commentated on four live matches in as many years with the BBC, and in 1996 he was offered a chance to return to ITV. Tyldesley's final weeks with the BBC were spent commentating on basketball and football at the 1996 Olympic Games in Atlanta.

== Return to ITV (1996–2024) ==
Tyldesley rejoined ITV in August 1996 as an understudy to Brian Moore. The move occurred so close to the start of the season that he was billed in newspapers and the Radio Times as the BBC's commentator on the Charity Shield, though Tony Gubba covered the game instead.

The first assignment on his return to commercial television was highlights of a UEFA Cup tie between Arsenal and Borussia Mönchengladbach on 10th September. His live match debut was the UEFA Champions League match between Fenerbahçe and Manchester United on 16 October 1996.

Just before Christmas 1996, senior commentator Brian Moore revealed to ITV Sport management his intention to retire after the 1998 World Cup. John Motson was immediately approached for the role as his successor, but declined the offer to remain at the BBC having secured an improved contract. Subsequently, Tyldesley became the network's lead football commentator.

During his first season in that role, he commentated, alongside Ron Atkinson, on all of Manchester United's games in their successful Champions League campaign, in addition to their FA Cup final victory in that treble season of 1999.

Tyldesley commentated on every Champions League final between 1998 and 2015 for ITV. He was ITV's lead commentator at the European Championships from 2000 to 2016 and the World Cup finals between 2002 and 2018. His regular co-commentators, after Atkinson's resignation in 2004, were David Pleat, Jim Beglin, Andy Townsend, Glenn Hoddle and Ally McCoist.

In July 2020, Tyldesley said he was "upset", "baffled" and "annoyed" when ITV promoted Sam Matterface to be senior commentator in his place. This decision sparked public controversy, but later that year, he joined CBS Sports to be their lead commentator for the UEFA Champions League. He is also a regular commentator on Amazon Prime Video's live coverage of the Premier League.

Tyldesley carried out his final commentary work for ITV at UEFA Euro 2024, specifically, the last-16 match between Germany and Denmark. The network declined to offer him a new contract.

In July 2023, Tyldesley stepped down from his role as a commentator on Talksport, later revealing he did so due to the station's betting links.

He has been a patron of the Bobby Moore Bowel Cancer Fund since 2010.

Amongst his other broadcast activities, Tyldesley has been a regular voice on Ant & Dec's Saturday Night Takeway and has been host of the International Electronic Games Conference at the Edinburgh Festival on two occasions.

== Other media ==
=== Video games ===
Tyldesley has provided commentary for a number of video games, including the EA Sports FIFA series starting with FIFA 06 and running until FIFA 17. From 2011 to 2017 he mostly partnered Andy Townsend (PS2 and PSP (Only FIFA 12 to FIFA 14), PC, PS3 & PS4 - International Friendly (FIFA 12 - FIFA 17), Wii, 3DS, iOS and Android (FIFA 12 - FIFA 15)) who also appeared before in the DS version of FIFA 11, FIFA World Cup 2006, UEFA Champions League 2006–2007, UEFA Euro 2008, 2010 FIFA World Cup South Africa, UEFA Euro 2012 and 2014 FIFA World Cup Brazil and options in commentary for FIFA 12 to FIFA 13. He also provided commentary for Championship Manager 2, the last in the franchise to feature verbal analysis, and the PlayStation video games This is Football and FA Premier League Stars 2001.

=== Podcast ===
In June 2024, Tyldesley began co-hosting 'The Football Authorities' podcast alongside his close friend Martin O'Neill. The podcast provides an in-depth analysis of football's major stories. The podcast also features a segment where listeners' questions are addressed.

== Commentary Charts ==
Tyldesley's own detailed research notes, dubbed his 'commentary charts', are published as commemorative prints.
