= EA Sports FC 26 =

2025 video game

- Ultimate edition cover art featuring Zlatan Ibrahimović
- Developers: EA Vancouver; EA Romania
- Publisher: EA Sports
- Series: EA Sports FC
- Engine: Frostbite
- Platforms: Nintendo Switch; Nintendo Switch 2; PlayStation 4; PlayStation 5; Windows; Xbox One; Xbox Series X/S
- Release: 26 September 2025
- Genre: Sports
- Modes: Single-player, multiplayer

EA Sports FC 26 is an association football simulation video game developed by EA Vancouver and EA Romania and published by EA Sports. It was released worldwide on 26 September 2025 for Microsoft Windows, PlayStation 4, PlayStation 5, Xbox One, Xbox Series X/S, Nintendo Switch, Nintendo Switch 2, and Amazon Luna. It is the third installment in the EA Sports FC series following EA FC 24 and EA FC 25 and the 33rd overall installment of EA Sports' football simulation games. The ultimate edition has Zlatan Ibrahimovic on the cover whilst the standard edition sees the return of Jude Bellingham and the introduction of Jamal Musiala.

== Gameplay ==
EA Sports FC 26 introduces significant gameplay innovations which include a complete overhaul of dribbling mechanics, enhanced artificial intelligence for player positioning, and more lifelike goalkeeper animations. The game also features two distinct gameplay presets: Competitive, tailored for Ultimate Team and Clubs with faster-paced action and smarter AI; and Authentic, designed for Career Mode with realistic football behaviors and tactics based on real-world data.

Various changes were also done to Career Mode, especially Manager Career. Manager Live Challenges were added, which allowed players to choose specific challenges to complete, such as winning the Treble, or being on top of the league by Christmas. Another new feature was Unexpected Events, which meant events similar to real-life scenarios such as players being home sick could affect your club. Player career also received some changes, notably the addition of Archetypes. That feature allowed players to choose a specific path or playing style for their player to progress, which enabled more personalization to the experience.

Swedish former footballer Zlatan Ibrahimović appears as the cover athlete of the Ultimate Edition, while Jude Bellingham and Jamal Musiala feature on alternate covers of the standard editions.

They removed the positions LWB and RWB and replaced them with a role (Wingback)

== Ultimate Edition ==
Standard and Ultimate versions of FC 26 were made available. In addition to extra in-game perks, players who bought the Ultimate Edition were granted seven days of early access. Instead of waiting for the launch date, players were able to play access the game 7 days earlier than the Standard Edition. Some benefits include 6000 FIFA Points, which are points that helped players in Ultimate Team get various benefits, such as stadium customization and Player Evolution Slots. Other benefits include extra Evolution Slots, which allows you to update and change your players, Archetype Consumables and more.

== Features ==
=== Licenses ===
FC 26 features more than 20,000 licensed players across over 750 clubs, 35 leagues, and national teams. FC 26 contains the UEFA Champions League, UEFA Women's Champions League, UEFA Super Cup, UEFA Conference League, and the UEFA Europa League all fully licensed. It is also home to the Premier League, LALIGA EA SPORTS, Bundesliga, Barclay's Women Super League, etc. Certain national football teams, such as Brazil and Japan, were absent due to licensing restrictions. However, the Brazil national team returned to the game following a multi-year licensing partnership between the Brazilian Football Confederation (CBF) and EA Sports FC announced in May 2026. Inter Milan, A.C. Milan, Atalanta and Lazio, are all once again absent, and are instead named Lombardia FC, Milano FC, Bergamo Calcio, and Latium, respectively.

At the game's release, the game contained 28 male national teams, with New Zealand being dropped. The game also contained 17 women national teams, with Mexico, Poland and Denmark getting added. In an update of FC 26, the Saudi Arabian national team, was also added.

New icons were also added to the game. They were available for pre-order up until August 26, 2025. The icons were; Alex Morgan, Zlatan Ibrahimovíc, Marcelo, Andrés Iniesta, Caroline Seger, Francesco Totti, Toni Kroos, Oliver Kahn, Giorgio Chiellini, Cha Bum-kun, Sissi, and Steffi Jones.

Several stadiums make their first appearance in FC 26, including; Everton's new Hill Dickinson Stadium, Stadio Diego Armando Maradona (Napoli), Tüpraş Stadyumu (Beşiktaş), Holstein-Stadion (Holstein Kiel), Stade de la Beaujoire (FC Nantes), Red Bull Arena (RB Salzburg), Stadion Wankdorf (BSC Young Boys), St. Jakob-Park (FC Basel), and the renovated Stadion am Böllenfalltor (SV Darmstadt 98). The Allianz Arena (Bayern Munich), absent since FIFA 20, also returns. In addition, Chase Stadium in Fort Lauderdale, Florida, home of Inter Miami CF, makes its debut. Several existing venues have also undergone rebuilds for FC 26, including Estadi Mallorca Son Moix (RCD Mallorca), Fratton Park (Portsmouth), and Stamford Bridge (Chelsea).

Thai League 1 club Buriram United was added to the game on April 7 following a new update. The Indonesia national team was later added to the game following a partnership deal with the Football Association of Indonesia.

=== Unlicensed additions ===
In May 2026, it was announced that an unlicensed 2026 FIFA World Cup mode, titled The World's Game, would be added to the game on June 4, 2026, with 53 fully licensed and playable national teams (41 of which are competing in the World Cup), two non-licensed teams with authentic players (Egypt and Japan), five non-licensed generic squads (Algeria, Curaçao, Iran, Iraq, and Jordan), and new World Cup stadiums.

== Release ==
=== FC Showcase ===
FC 26 Showcase, a free preview version of the game, was also released on 26 September 2025. It is available on the PlayStation 5, PlayStation 4, Xbox One, PC, and Xbox Series X|S. The modes available are Kick-Off where can you play with against teams, Learn to Play, where you can play learn the basics of FC 26, and Clubs, a 5V5 mode. In Mexico and the United Arab Emirates, a limited version of Ultimate Team is available.

== Ultimate Team ==
The Ultimate Team gamemode for FC 26 included many new additions, like a new Playstyles Lab for certain card types, 5 Game Tournaments named gauntlets, where players must change their team every game to compete, and a token store where players can exchange tokens earned from objectives to spend them in a shop.

== Reception ==
Reception

Aggregate scores
Aggregator	Score
Metacritic	(PC) 78/100 (PS5) 77/100 (XSX) 78/100 (NS2) 78/100
OpenCritic	83% recommend

Review scores
Publication	Score
GameSpot	7/10
GamesRadar+	4/5
IGN	7/10
PC Gamer (US)	77/100
Push Square	7/10
The Guardian	4/5
IGN Spain	8/10

FC 26 received "generally favorable" reviews according to review aggregation website Metacritic. OpenCritic determined that 83% of critics recommended the game.

The game was nominated for "Best Sports/Racing Game" and "Innovation in Accessibility" at The Game Awards 2025, as well as for "Sports Game of the Year" at the 29th Annual D.I.C.E. Awards, but did not win in any of those categories.

=== Sales ===
In September 2025, the game debuted as the best-selling game in the United Kingdom. By October 2025, FC 26 sold more than 12 million copies, whereas 8 millions of those copies were for PlayStation consoles, with 88% going to PS5, and 12% for PS4, though sales on other platforms are currently unknown.
