= EA Sports FC Mobile =

- EA Sports FC Mobile cover during the early stages of its release, featuring Real Madrid's Vinícius Júnior
- Developers: EA Mobile; EA Canada
- Publishers: WW: EA Sports; CHN: Tencent Games; KOR: Nexon; VIE: Garena
- Producer: Matt Lafreniere
- Series: FIFA (2016–2023); EA Sports FC (2023–present)
- Engine: FIFA 08 (2016–2018); Impact (2018–present)
- Platforms: iOS iPadOS; Android
- Release: WW: 11 October 2016; EA Sports FC Mobile: WW: 25 September 2023
- Genre: Sports
- Modes: Single-player, Multiplayer

EA Sports FC Mobile (commonly known as EA FC Mobile and formerly known as FIFA Mobile until 25 September 2023) is an association football simulation video game developed by EA Mobile and EA Vancouver and published by EA Sports for global version, Tencent Games for Chinese version, Nexon for Japanese and Korean versions and Garena for Vietnamese version for iOS and Android. It was released on 11 October 2016 which came back in someday of October 2025 as a replacement to the FIFA Ultimate Team mobile games, for iOS and Android. Microsoft Windows was also included until 2017. It was announced on 16 August 2016, during Gamescom 2016.

The Japanese version of FC Mobile was removed from app stores on 9 July 2025 and online servers were shut down on 9 October 2025, due to the success of eFootball in the home country.

== Gameplay ==
The player begins by creating a personal team, in which the players correspond to real players whether present or past. Players are obtained by competing in and completing daily quests, games, or events, or can be purchased on the transfer market, exchange market, or in-game store. Alongside these ways of obtaining players; the in-game currency of coins, gems, and seasonal tokens can all also be obtained, which can be spent in the previously mentioned markets. The personal team is used for PvP matches in Division Rivals and some Live Events. Other Live Event matches and Tournament matches have the player use a real team to play.

=== Division Rivals ===
There are different types of Division Rivals matches, with them being VS Attack, Head to Head, Manager Mode, and Quick Match.

VS Attack: The game has a "VS Attack" mode, better known as VSA, in which players play the different offensive stages of a match only, and the difficulty level of the chances is decided by the team OVR. The VS Attack mode features an asynchronous turn-based multiplayer. Apart from VS Attack, there are also other Division Rivals multiplayer gamemodes, being Head to Head and Manager Mode.

Head to Head: Head to Head, or more commonly known as H2H, is a PvP match in which a player plays a full 90-minute match. However, the time is sped up, so fulltime will take about six to eight minutes. If the score is tied by the end of the match, the game will not go into extra time. The only gamemode where it is possible to go into extra time is when the player is playing against the AI or another player in Tournaments or PvP.

Manager Mode: Manager Mode (MM) is a gamemode where the AI will play against each other instead of the player manually controlling the players on the pitch. The idea of MM is more focused on tactics than skill, while you are the manager acting as the head coach, changing formations, making strategies, etc. all in real time.

Quick Match: There is also another section called Quick Match where the player can play a VSA or H2H match against an added FC Mobile friend.

As the name suggests, there are different divisions in Division Rivals. This is so as to split the players of different levels of gameplay. When the player reaches a certain number of stars, the division will increase. Lose matches and you will lose stars, and you can get demoted. Every 28 days, the divisions will reset.

With VS Attack, Head to Head, and Quick Match as of the June 11th, 2025 a new Rivals update has changed the way the ranking system works. A new UI has been made, with loads of new features such as rewards. A brand new star ranking system has been introduced to make promotion easier.

=== Live Events ===
The game features events, some being in the real world that includes the following:

- UEFA Champions League (since FIFA Mobile 19)
- CONMEBOL Libertadores (since FC Mobile 24)
- FIFA World Cup (appeared only in FIFA Mobile 18 and FIFA Mobile 23)
- UEFA European Championship (since FC Mobile 24)
- Copa América (since FC Mobile 24)
- AFC Asian Cup (since FC Mobile 27)
- Premier League
- La Liga
- Ligue 1
- Bundesliga
- Major League Soccer
- Team Of The Season
- Aqua VS. Inferno
- Ragnarok
- Grassroot Greats
- Captains
- Anniversary Event FC26
- Footyverse
- A Nation's Story
- Glorious Eras
- Record Breakers
- Festive Fixtures
- Team Of The Year (more commonly referred as TOTY)
- Songkran Splash (newest event contains openable packs and a mini pass)
- and other different leagues throughout the world.

Starting from FIFA Mobile 23, the game featured Tournament Mode, themed on several real life football events, such as the 2022 FIFA World Cup, the UEFA Champions League, the UEFA Euro 2024 (the latter two events appeared in EA Sports FC Mobile 24), 2026 FIFA World Cup (as The World's Game, appeared in FC Mobile 26) and 2027 AFC Asian Cup (possibility added in FC Mobile 27).

== Development and release ==
EA announced the game on 16 August 2016, during Gamescom 2016 and the game was released worldwide on October 11, 2016, for iOS, Android, and Microsoft Windows. In November 2017, EA ended support for FIFA Mobile on Windows devices. In 2018, Tencent Games released the Chinese version of the game. In 2020, Nexon released the Korean and Japanese version of the game. In 2025, Garena released the Vietnamese version of the game.

=== Version overview ===
Released versions of the game
Title	First release	Engine	Handheld
FIFA Mobile 17	11 October 2016	Old Engine (based on FIFA 08)	Android, iOS, Windows 10 Mobile
FIFA Mobile 18	16 September 2017	Old Engine (based on FIFA 08)	Android, iOS
FIFA Mobile 19	8 November 2018	Impact Engine (1st generation)	Android, iOS
FIFA Mobile 20	18 September 2019	Impact Engine (1st generation)	Android, iOS, iPadOS
FIFA Mobile 21	2 November 2020	Impact Engine (1st generation, 2nd generation in Asian version)	Android, iOS, iPadOS
FIFA Mobile 22	18 January 2022	Impact Engine (2nd generation)	Android, iOS, iPadOS
FIFA Mobile 23	8 November 2022	Impact Engine (2nd generation)	Android, iOS, iPadOS
EA Sports FC Mobile 24	21 September 2023	Impact Engine (3rd generation)	Android, iOS, iPadOS
EA Sports FC Mobile 25	24 September 2024	Impact Engine (3rd generation)	Android, iOS, iPadOS
EA Sports FC Mobile 26	25 September 2025 (worldwide) 16 October 2025 (Vietnam)	Impact Engine (3rd generation)	Android, iOS, iPadOS
EA Sports FC Mobile 27	24 September 2026 (worldwide) 15 October 2026 (Vietnam)	Impact Engine (3rd generation)	Android, iOS, iPadOS

=== FIFA Mobile 17 ===
On 23 June 2016, EA Sports announced that the J1 League and J.League Cup would be featured in the game for the first time. On 4 September 2016, EA Sports announced at Brasil Game Show 2016 that 19 Campeonato Brasileiro Série A teams will be featured in their respective league (Corinthians and Flamengo, who signed an exclusivity deal with Konami for Pro Evolution Soccer, do not appear). Five Série B teams are also in the game. The Brazilian teams in the game have generic player names which the user cannot change.

=== FIFA Mobile 18 ===
FIFA Mobile 18 was announced by EA Sports for Global version in 2017 and Tencent Games for Chinese version in 2018. It features the third tier of Germany's Bundesliga, the 3. Liga, and has again included the Turkish Süper Lig after EA renewed its licence with them. The Chinese version have several differences compared to the Global version, such as the introduction of Head to Head, which later adopted in FIFA Mobile 19 Global version.

=== FIFA Mobile 19 ===
FIFA Mobile 19 introduces the UEFA Champions League. It was confirmed that the game would have a licensed Serie A. The game will include the CSL, the first FIFA title to do so. However, it was confirmed that the game will not include the Russian Premier League, as it did in FIFA Mobile 18 and previous FIFA Mobile versions. The Russian Premier League teams PFC CSKA Moscow, Spartak Moscow, and Lokomotiv Moscow were kept, while Dinamo Zagreb, Dynamo Kyiv, Slavia Praha, and Viktoria Plzen were added to the game. Boca Juniors appears as Buenos Aires FC in the game since the club signed a deal with Konami; for the same reasons, Colo-Colo appears as CD Viñazur. Once again, due to Konami securing deals with certain Brazilian clubs, the Campeonato Brasileiro Série A is featured in an incomplete form, this time with only 15 clubs, with the notable omissions of São Paulo, Palmeiras, Corinthians, Flamengo and Vasco da Gama, all of which are Konami partners. The remaining Brazilian clubs, while appearing with licensed branding, do not have any of their players licensed due to an ongoing judicial dispute over image rights, which are negotiated individually with each player, unlike other countries.

After the two previous games used the old FIFA 08 engine, the game changed to Impact Engine for the first time, which was previously used for the mobile version of FIFA 16 Ultimate Team.

=== FIFA Mobile 20 ===
The game featured more than 30 official leagues, over 700 clubs and over 17,000 players. It included for the first time the Romanian Liga 1 and its 16 teams and also the Indian Super League (ISL) with all of its 11 clubs, as well as UAE club, Al Ain, who were added following extensive requests from the fans in the region.

In 2020, Nexon announced the Korean and Japanese version of FIFA Mobile, which differ in terms of graphics and gameplay like the Chinese version.

=== FIFA Mobile 21 ===
FIFA Mobile 21 was released on 2 November 2020. This season of FIFA Mobile saw the addition of the League Matchups mode. The Chinese, Japanese and Korean version also have another major changes in terms of graphics and new Impact Engine gameplay, which later adopted to FIFA Mobile 22 Global version.

=== FIFA Mobile 22 ===
EA Sports announced the arrival of FIFA Mobile 22 for Android and iOS devices. This season of FIFA Mobile made more changes in terms of graphics and gameplay similar to the Chinese, Japanese and Korean version of FIFA Mobile 21. A new market system was introduced. Regions were also added based on location, with players only being able to play with others in their region. The 2022 update also saw the removal of 'Stamina'. Clubs such as Ferencvárosi TC, Hajduk Split, Wrexham FC, and APOEL FC were added to the game. EA released its FIFA Mobile 22 on January 18, 2022.

=== FIFA Mobile 23 ===
The final FIFA Mobile 23 cover, featuring (from left to right) Raúl, Javier Zanetti and Steven Gerrard, respectively

In November 2022, FIFA Mobile 23 (the final season until the game was changed as EA Sports FC Mobile) was released as a season update of FIFA Mobile 22, with several changes such as Advanced Passing and the Squads would not be reset after season update. FIFA Mobile 23 was the first and only version that featured the 2022 FIFA World Cup tournament mode.

In 2023, the Chinese, Japanese and Korean version had another update in terms of gameplay graphics, which later were adopted to the successor EA Sports FC Mobile.

=== EA Sports FC Mobile 24 ===
In 2023, EA Sports FIFA Mobile was renamed to EA Sports FC Mobile due to their licensing fee being too expensive for them, almost double of the annual pay, being $300 million per year from the $150 million per year. In the launch of EA Sports FC Mobile 24 on September 21, for the Chinese version, September 22 for the Korean version, September 23 for the Japanese version, and 25 September for the global version. Following the split between EA and FIFA, features included cross-regional play, power shots, new skills, the return of a global market, and a new UEFA Champions League tournament mode. FC Mobile also included CONMEBOL Libertadores for the first time as a Live Event.

In April 2024, the game had another major update, which included a gameplay graphics improvement and new Spectator Mode.

On 11 June 2024, the game had another new update, which featured UEFA Euro 2024 tournament mode and Live Event. Later, FC Mobile also included 2024 Copa América for the first time as a Live Event.

=== EA Sports FC Mobile 25 ===
EA Sports FC Mobile 25 is the season update of EA Sports FC Mobile 24 to celebrate first anniversary since FIFA Mobile was renamed as EA Sports FC Mobile, launched on 24 September 2024. Just like FIFA Mobile 23, the Squads would not be reset after season update. This season saw the addition of new mode called Club Challenge, in which player compete against other users in head to head matches like Head to Head mode, except with clubs from several leagues around the world, such as Premier League, La Liga and CONMEBOL Libertadores. In 2025, several modes such as League and Division Rivals got major revamped.

=== EA Sports FC Mobile 26 ===
EA Sports FC Mobile 26 (also called as EA Sports FC Mobile 26 Update) is the season update of EA Sports FC Mobile 25 to celebrate second anniversary since FIFA Mobile was renamed as EA Sports FC Mobile. Several changes of FC Mobile 26 such as new fresh UI, gameplay update, new formations, team badge system and PlayStyles. A complete currency overhaul was made, removing Dudek and Mascherano tokens, which were used to rank up players. Just like previous season, the Squads would not be reset after season update. This season update was launched on September 25, 2025.

On 5 September 2025, Garena announced the Vietnamese version of EA Sports FC Mobile, using the same graphics and gameplay from the global version, except with the addition of several live events that featured some notable football players from Vietnam national football team. The closed beta of the Vietnamese version was released on 18 September 2025 and was launched on 16 October, 2025. The Chinese and Korean version originally still using same graphics and gameplay from EA Sports FC Mobile 25, before changed to the current one like the global and Vietnamese versions since April 2026.

As a side note, this was the first season of FC Mobile that adding the year in the game title to officially known as the mobile version of EA Sports FC 26 instead of being a separate mobile game, similar to Madden NFL Mobile since the 2020–21 season.

=== EA Sports FC Mobile 27 ===
EA Sports FC Mobile 27 is the season update of EA Sports FC Mobile, launched on September 24, 2026. Several changes of FC Mobile 27 such as updated UI, gameplay update, live game plan formation, updates PlayStyles and new Gauntlet Kick Off mode. In Vietnam, FC Mobile 27 will be released on October 15, 2026 to celebrate the first anniversary for the Vietnamese version of the game. The 70th Anniversary Ballon d'Or event launched on October 22, 2026, following the 3rd Anniversary event. The event features new players with maximum ratings of 124 OVR.
