= UEFA Champions League 2006–2007 (video game) =

2007 video game

- Developer: EA Canada
- Publisher: EA Sports
- Series: UEFA Champions League
- Platforms: Microsoft Windows; PlayStation 2 PlayStation Portable; Xbox 360
- Release: Microsoft Windows: EU: 22 March 2007; PlayStation 2, PlayStation Portable, Xbox 360: NA: 20 March 2007; EU: 23 March 2007
- Genre: Sports
- Modes: Single-player, Multiplayer

UEFA Champions League 2006–2007 is the official video game of the 2006–07 season of the UEFA Champions League. Developed by EA Canada, it is published by Electronic Arts worldwide under the EA Sports label. It was released on 20 March 2007 in North America, 22 March in Australia, and 23 March in Europe.

This was the last game by EA Sports to include the Champions League until FIFA 19 over eleven years later. Konami held the Champions League license in the interim, with the competition featuring in all its Pro Evolution Soccer games from Pro Evolution Soccer 2009 to Pro Evolution Soccer 2018.

== Overview ==
UEFA Champions League 2006–2007 was developed with the same engine used in FIFA 07, with slight graphical and gameplay adjustments, as well as the option to play a new manager mode named The Treble. The in-game commentators are Clive Tyldesley and Andy Townsend. Ultimate Team was introduced for the first time on the Xbox 360 version.
