= FIFA Online 3 =

2012 video game

- Developers: Electronic Arts, EA Spearhead
- Publishers: KOR: Nexon; CHN: Tencent Games; SEA: Garena
- Series: FIFA Online
- Engine: Impact
- Platforms: Microsoft Windows iOS, Android
- Release: KOR: December 18, 2012; THA: 25 July 2013; VIE: 11 September 2013; SIN: 25 October 2013; MYS: 25 October 2013; IDN: 25 February 2014; CHN: 28 April 2014
- Genre: Sports
- Modes: Single-player, multiplayer

FIFA Online 3 was a free-to-play massively multiplayer online football game which was announced on 13 August 2012 and entered the 1st closed beta on 20 September 2012 to 23 September of that same year in South Korea. On December 18, 2012, it was released in South Korea.

FIFA Online 3 shut down all of its services on June 7, 2021.

== Development ==
FIFA Online 3 was originally developed for PC multi-player by Electronic Arts Seoul Studio based on the FIFA 11 engine. It has been launched through licensing agreements in South Korea (published by Nexon), Thailand (published by Garena), Indonesia (published by Garena), Vietnam (published by Garena), Singapore, Malaysia (published by Garena), and China (published by Tencent).

Each version's interface and commentaries had been localised into the local language.

On 25 July 2013 it was released into Open Beta in Thailand. FIFA Online 3 was released into open beta in Vietnam, on 11 September 2013. In Indonesia, it was released on 25 February 2014. In China it was released into open beta on 28 April 2014.

English Version

The Singapore and Malaysia version of FIFA Online 3 was the game's first available English version and is published by Garena Online. It was released on 10 October 2013. The game was accessible through the Garena Plus platform by changing the platform's region setting to Singapore/Malaysia.

FIFA Online 3 Mobile

On 29 May 2014, FO3 M was released in South Korea. It was released in Singapore and Malaysia on 3 May 2016. It was available on iOS and Android mobile phones.

== Gameplay ==
In FIFA Online 3, players could choose to play and customize a team from any of over 30 leagues and 15,000 real world players. Players could either play single-player through a season, or play against other online players. Playing matches earned EP, which was the in-game currency used to buy players and items.

FIFA Online 3's gameplay was similar to FIFA 11 in the beginning, but had switched to Impact engine which is similar to FIFA 14 since 2015. The game added support for multiplayer online play. Players could play custom matches of up to 3 players a side. An online transfer market to buy or sell players, a club system and a premium (real world cash) item shop were also available.

FIFA Online 3 featured several game modes that are similar to the ones that were in FIFA Online 2. League Mode had not been significantly changed, while the online modes have been slightly edited. Players can now play friendly games against players of similar skill (Quick 1vs1) or random players (VS Random), and can also play against their friends (VS Custom). Players also had the option to play as the manager by controlling the team's tactics and formation (VS Manager).

The FIFA Online 2 World Tour had been upgraded to a ranking system (Ranking Mode), where every player started with 1500 point,s and can play against players who have a similar number of points. Winning a match was rewarded with 10 points, with more points added/deducted on to each consecutive win/loss and the difference in the number of goals scored/conceded in each match. Rewards were given out at the end of every in-game season to all players based on their points.

FIFA Online 3 was playable using a keyboard using certain keys to play, and arrows on the keyboard or a gamepad.

== Reception ==
FIFA Online 3 was the second-most popular game in South Korea as of October 2013.
