= 2014 World Cup (disambiguation) =

The 2014 World Cup was the 20th edition of the FIFA international association football tournament.

2014 World Cup may also refer to:

== Association football ==
- 2014 FIFA U-20 Women's World Cup
- 2014 FIFA U-17 Women's World Cup
- 2014 FIFA Club World Cup
- 2014 ConIFA World Football Cup, for nations not affiliated to FIFA

== Video games ==
- 2014 FIFA World Cup Brazil (video game)

== Other sports ==
- 2014 Alpine Skiing World Cup
- 2014 Archery World Cup
- 2014 Canoe Slalom World Cup
- 2014 Cricket World Cup Qualifier
- 2013–14 UCI Track Cycling World Cup
- 2014 FIBA Basketball World Cup
- 2014 IAAF Continental Cup, in athletics
- 2014 ICC World Twenty20
- 2014 Men's Hockey World Cup
- 2014 Women's Hockey World Cup
- 2014 UCI Women's Road World Cup, in cycling
- 2014 Women's Rugby World Cup, in rugby union
