= 2014 FIFA World Cup Brazil (video game) =

2014 video game

- Game cover
- Developer: EA Canada
- Publisher: EA Sports
- Series: FIFA World Cup
- Platforms: PlayStation 3, Xbox 360
- Release: NA: 15 April 2014; EU: 17 April 2014
- Genre: Sports
- Modes: Single-player, multiplayer

2014 FIFA World Cup Brazil is the official video game for the 2014 FIFA World Cup, published by EA Sports for PlayStation 3 and Xbox 360. It was released on 15 April 2014 in North America, and 17 April 2014 in Europe, as was the case with the 2010 edition.

== Gameplay ==
Gameplay improvements from FIFA 14 include dribbling and increased accuracy in passing and first-touch mechanics.

The game's campaign mode, Road to Rio de Janeiro, allows players to play through qualification and the actual FIFA World Cup. For only the third time in the history of World Cup video games, the entire qualification series is playable. The 2010 version only presented the UEFA and CONMEBOL groups in their true to life form. Another mode, Road to Rio de Janeiro, allows players to compete in an online tournament across the 12 venues of the 2014 FIFA World Cup. It is similar in format to Seasons in FIFA 14 and Expedition mode from UEFA Euro 2012.

Captain Your Country, Online FIFA World Cup, Story of Qualifying, and Story of the Finals modes (the latter two integrated with EA Sports Football Club) from the 2010 edition returned to the 2014 edition.

For the first time in the FIFA series, coaches as well as spectators, either in the stadium or through FIFA Fan Fest and generic viewing events worldwide, are included to improve the immersive feeling. Coaches and spectators will react to happenings on the pitch, from scoring a goal to getting a card and winning the World Cup. Then-FIFA president Sepp Blatter even appears to present the World Cup trophy to the captain of the winning team at the final.

== Teams and venues ==
The game contains all of the 203 national teams that took part in the 2014 FIFA World Cup qualification process. The national teams of Bhutan, Brunei, Guam, Mauritania, Mauritius and South Sudan, all of which did not participate in World Cup qualifying, despite being FIFA members, do not feature in the game. Most teams have licensed kits as well as kits worn during the World Cup for all 32 teams that qualified in real life plus other selected teams that did not, while other teams have generic unlicensed kits which resemble their official kits. As with the 2010 game however, all teams contain fully licensed players and stats.

The game includes all 12 venues used at the 2014 FIFA World Cup, as well as stadiums from each qualifying region and a range of generic stadiums.

== Soundtrack ==
The official song of the World Cup, "We Are One (Ole Ola)" by Pitbull, Jennifer Lopez and Claudia Leitte, was included in the game's soundtrack.

Additionally, the game features EA Sports Talk Radio, where players can choose one of two channels, each featuring a pair of pundits commenting on user-controlled teams' progress and answering e-mails, texts, and tweets. Andy Goldstein of Talksport and Ian Darke of ESPN host one channel, while the Men in Blazers (Michael Davies and Roger Bennett – both of ESPN at the time but now with NBC Sports) host the second channel

The game includes 34 tracks from artists all over the world including Australia, Canada, Israel, Mexico, the United States and Brazil.

== Reception ==
Reception

Aggregate score
Aggregator	Score
Metacritic	(PS3) 73/100 (X360) 74/100

2014 FIFA World Cup Brazil received "mixed or average" reviews from critics, according to Metacritic.

=== Platforms criticism ===
The game was criticised for being available on only a few platforms. Despite releasing the game during the eighth generation of video game consoles, Electronic Arts decided against developing versions of the game for the PlayStation 4, the Xbox One or PC, as there were several major regions in the world where such systems were not adopted widely enough, especially the host country, Brazil.

Due to this criticism, on 29 May 2014, EA released 2014 FIFA World Cup as a new game mode for the PlayStation 4 and Xbox One versions of FIFA 14. For the PC, EA released 2014 FIFA World Cup as an update for FIFA Online 3 on 27 May 2014.
