= 2014 FIFA World Cup venues =

List of venues used in the 2014 FIFA world cup

Twelve venues (seven new and five renovated) in twelve Brazilian cities were selected for the 2014 FIFA World Cup. The cities also housed the 32 teams and fan-zones for spectators without tickets for the stations. Around 3 million tickets were put on sale of which most were sold out in a day. Eighteen locations were presented as potential host cities with the twelve successful candidates announced on 31 May 2009: Belém, Campo Grande, Florianópolis, Goiânia and Rio Branco were rejected, while Maceió had already withdrawn in January 2009.

FIFA proposed that no more than one city could use two stadiums, and the number of host cities was limited between eight and ten. However, FIFA subsequently accepted the Brazilian Football Confederation's suggestion to use twelve host cities in "the interest of the whole country". The twelve selections – each the capital of its state – covered all the main regions of Brazil and created more evenly distributed hosting than the 1950 finals in Brazil provided, when matches were concentrated in the south-east and south. Consequently, the tournament required significant long-distance travel for teams. Statistics show that nearly 10 million passengers used around 20 Brazilian airports in 31 days of the tournament.

== Stadiums ==
The 64 matches were staged at the following 12 stadiums:

Rio de Janeiro, RJ	Brasília, DF	São Paulo, SP	Fortaleza, CE
Estádio do Maracanã	Estádio Nacional Mané Garrincha	Arena de São Paulo	Estádio Castelão
22°54′43.8″S 43°13′48.59″W	15°47′0.6″S 47°53′56.99″W	23°32′43.91″S 46°28′24.14″W	3°48′26.16″S 38°31′20.93″W
Capacity: 74,738; Renovated; 4 Group/1 R_{16}/1 QF/Final	Capacity: 69,432; New stadium 4 Group/1 R_{16}/1 QF/3rd place	Capacity: 63,321; New stadium 4 Group/1 R_{16}/1 SF	Capacity: 60,348; Renovated; 4 Group/1 R_{16}/1 QF
Belo Horizonte, MG	2014 FIFA World Cup venues is located in Brazil		Porto Alegre, RS
Estádio Mineirão	2014 FIFA World Cup venues is located in Brazil		Estádio Beira-Rio
19°51′57″S 43°58′15″W	2014 FIFA World Cup venues is located in Brazil		30°3′56.21″S 51°14′9.91″W
Capacity: 58,259; Renovated; 4 Group/1 R_{16}/1 SF	2014 FIFA World Cup venues is located in Brazil		Capacity: 43,394; Renovated; 4 Group/1 R_{16}
Salvador, BA	2014 FIFA World Cup venues is located in Brazil		Recife, PE
Arena Fonte Nova	2014 FIFA World Cup venues is located in Brazil		Arena Pernambuco
12°58′43″S 38°30′15″W	2014 FIFA World Cup venues is located in Brazil		8°2′24″S 35°0′29″W
Capacity: 51,708; New stadium 4 Group/1 R_{16}/1 QF	2014 FIFA World Cup venues is located in Brazil		Capacity: 42,583; New stadium 4 Group/1 R_{16}
Cuiabá, MT	Manaus, AM	Natal, RN	Curitiba, PR
Arena Pantanal	Arena da Amazônia	Arena das Dunas	Arena da Baixada
15°36′11″S 56°7′14″W	3°4′59″S 60°1′41″W	5°49′44.18″S 35°12′49.91″W	25°26′54″S 49°16′37″W
Capacity: 41,112; New stadium 4 Group	Capacity: 40,549; New stadium 4 Group	Capacity: 39,971; New stadium 4 Group	Capacity: 39,631; Renovated; 4 Group

=== Construction ===
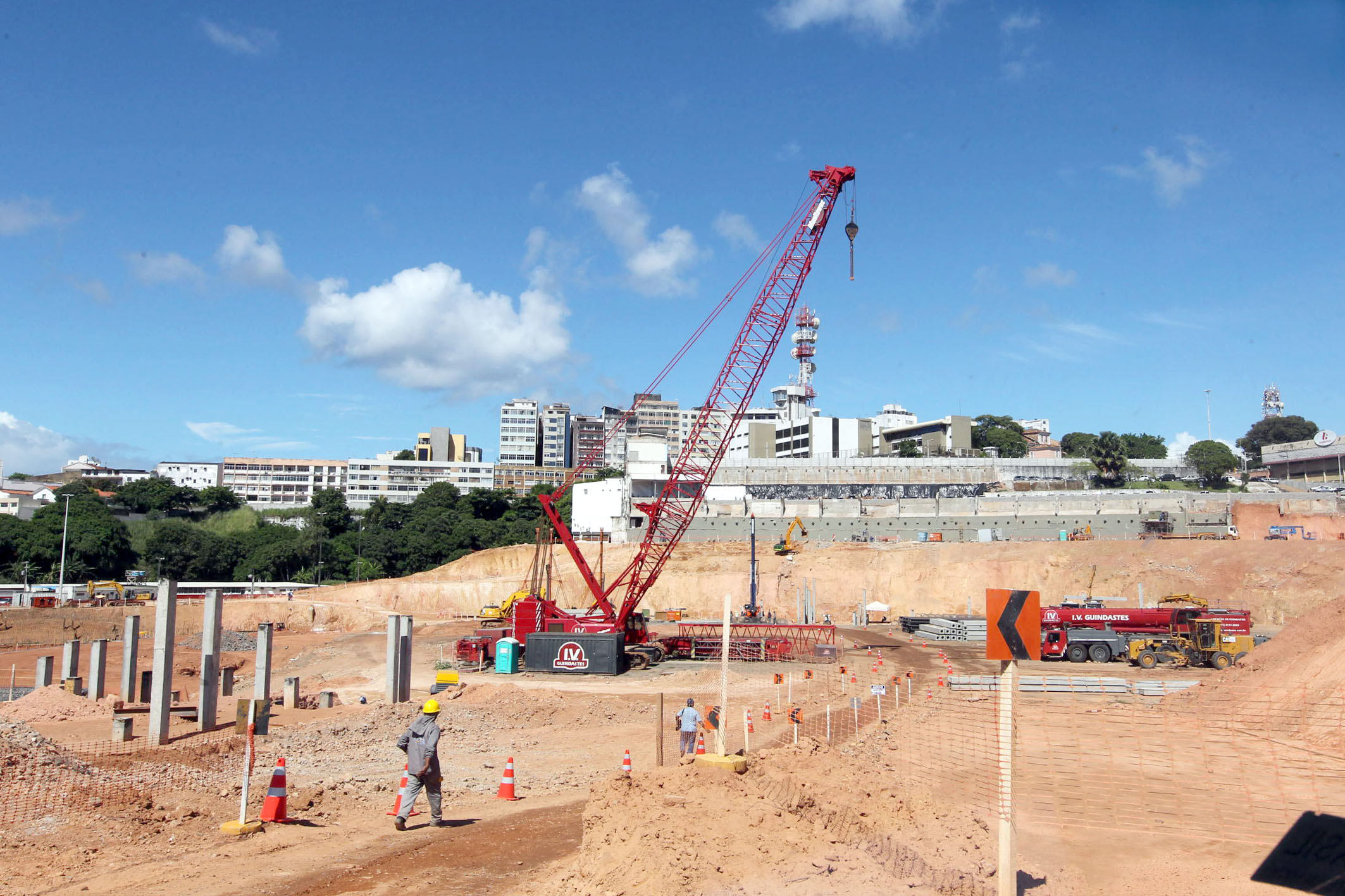
Arena Fonte Nova (2011)

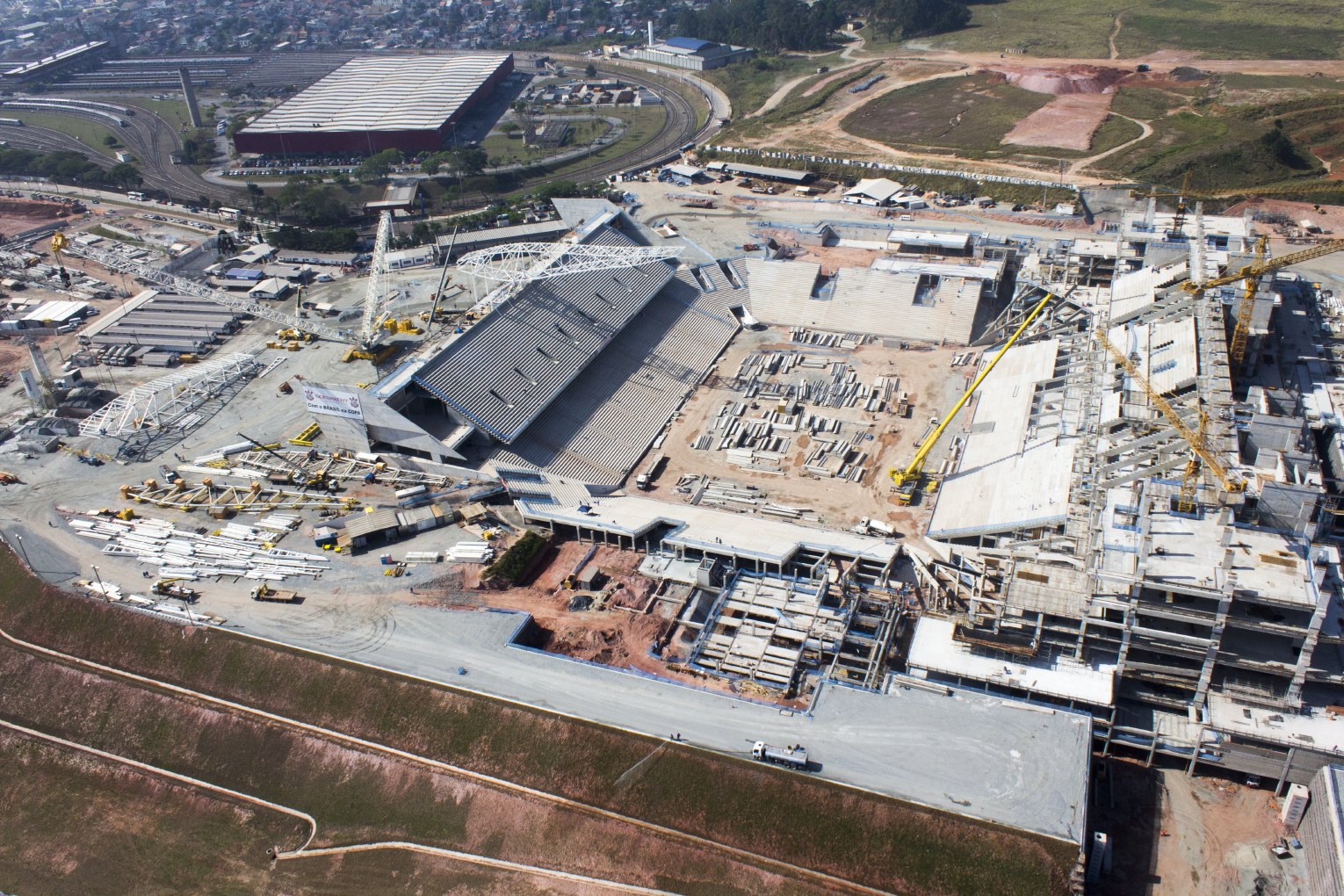
Arena de São Paulo (2012)

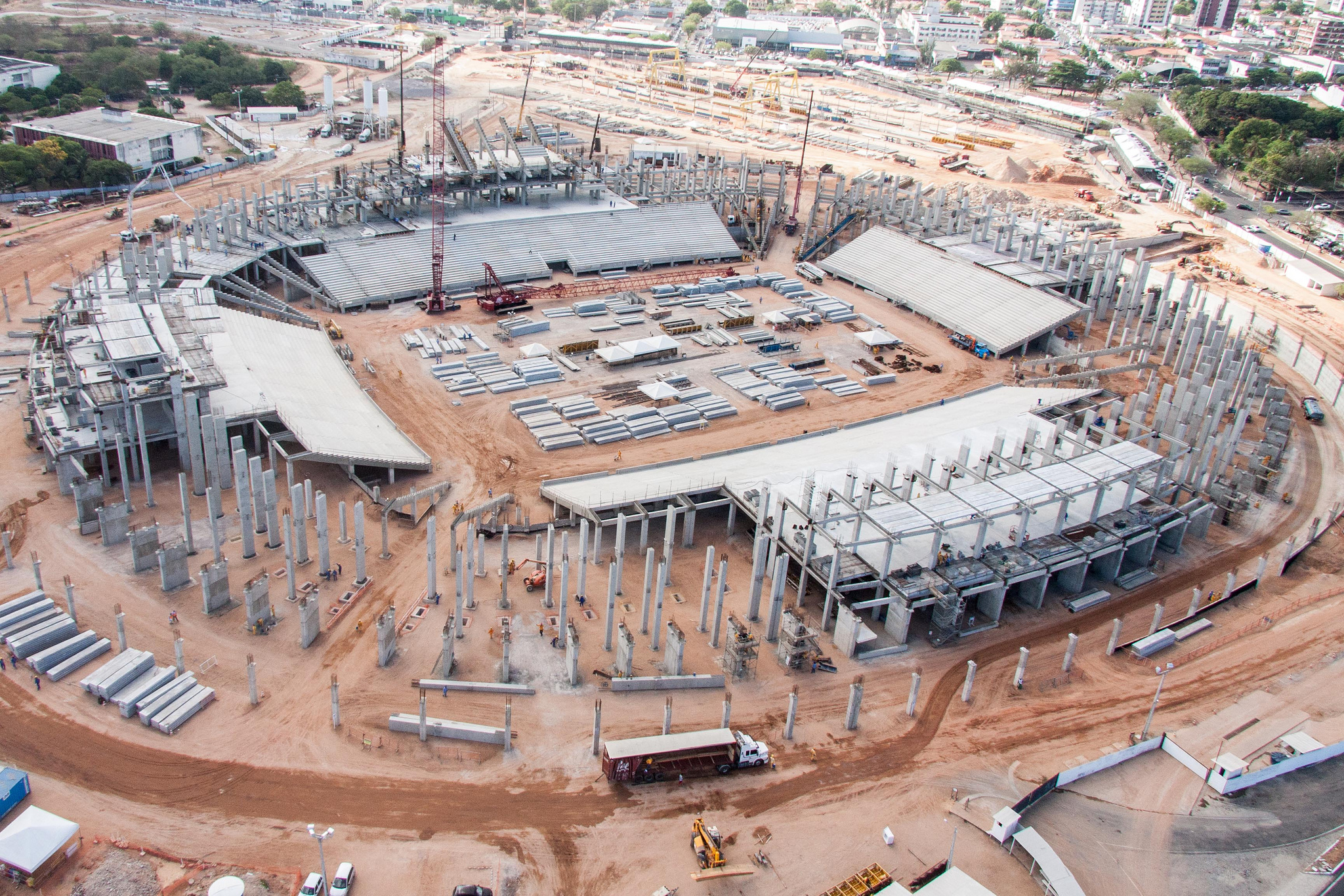
Arena das Dunas (2012)

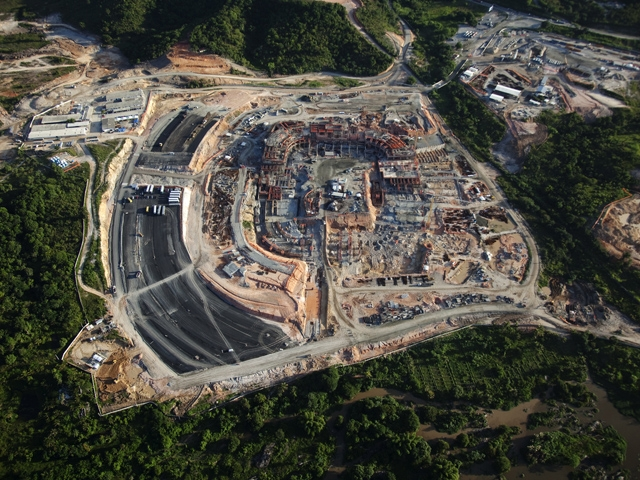
Arena Pernambuco (2012)

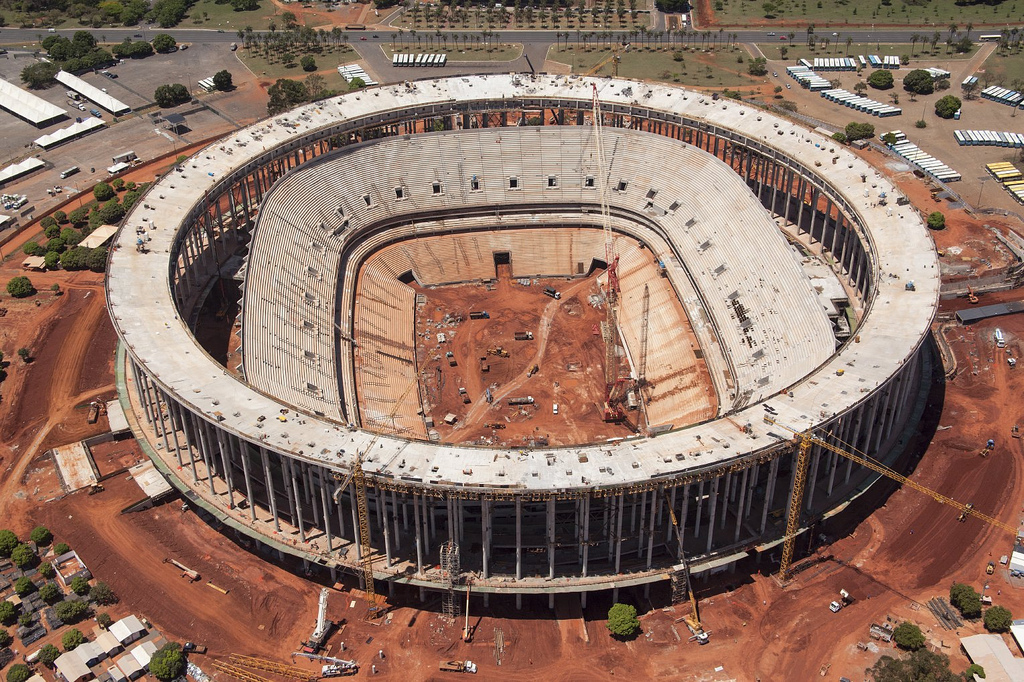
Estádio Nacional (2012)

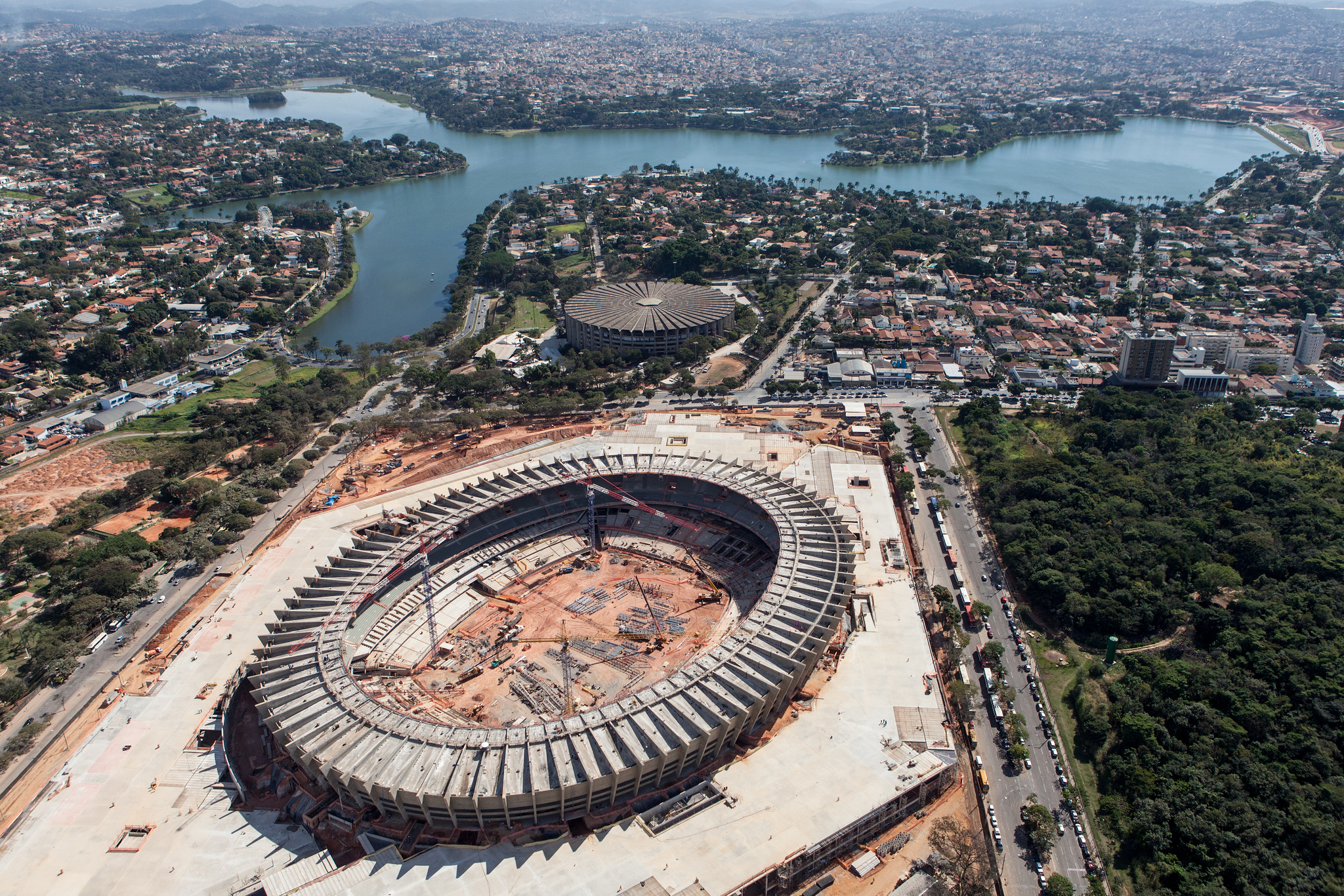
Estádio Mineirão (2012)

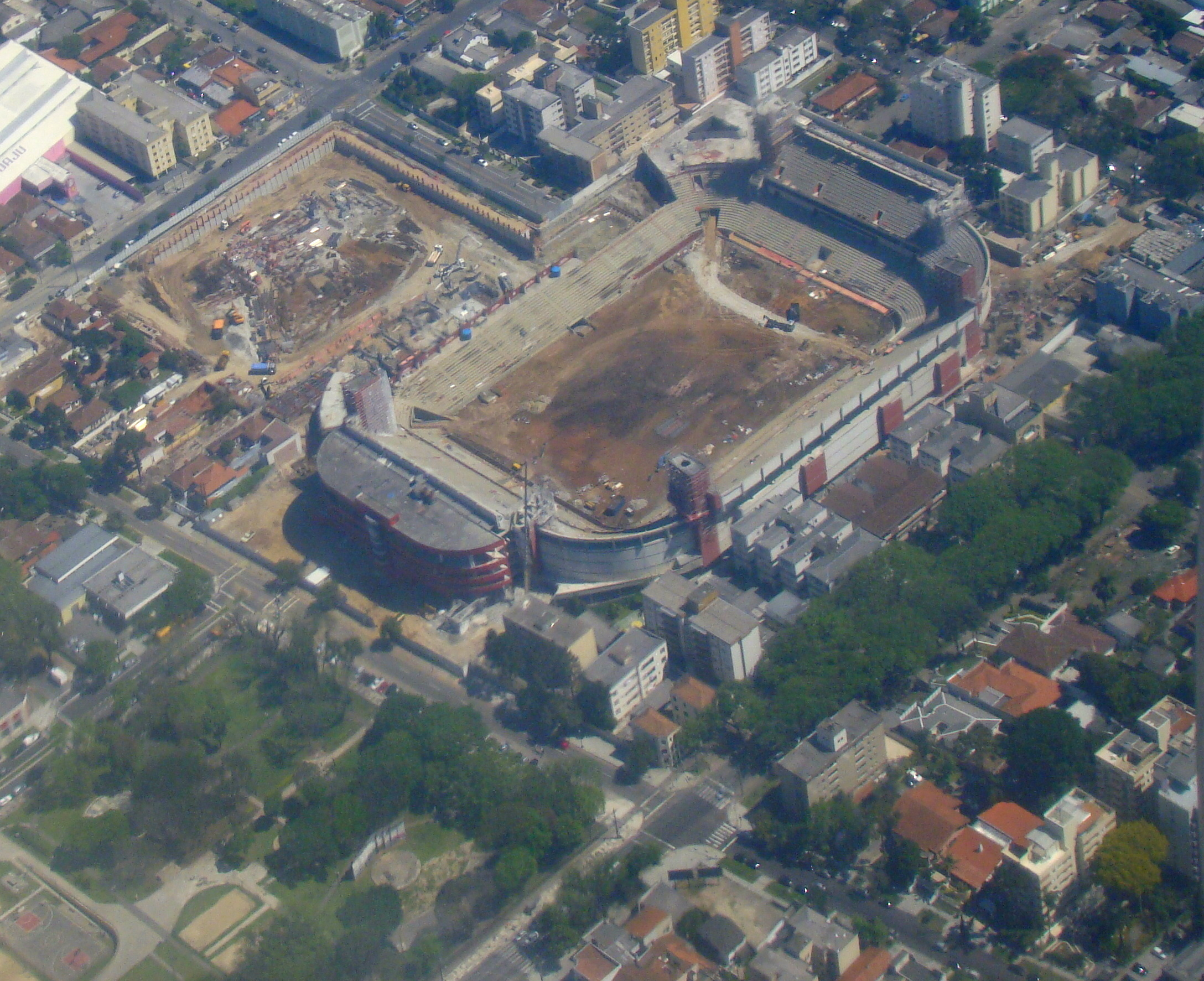
Arena da Baixada (2012)

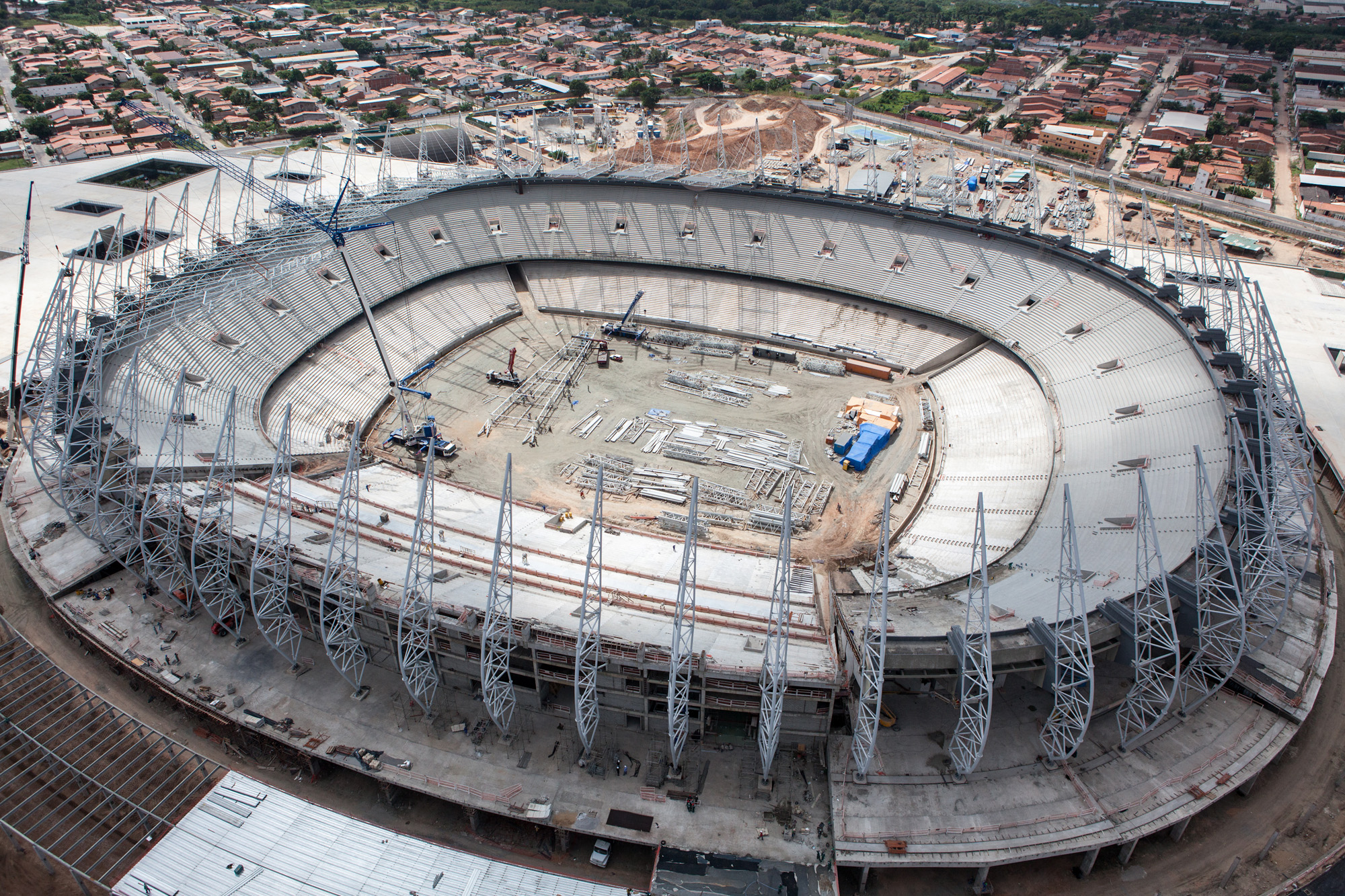
Arena Castelão (2012)

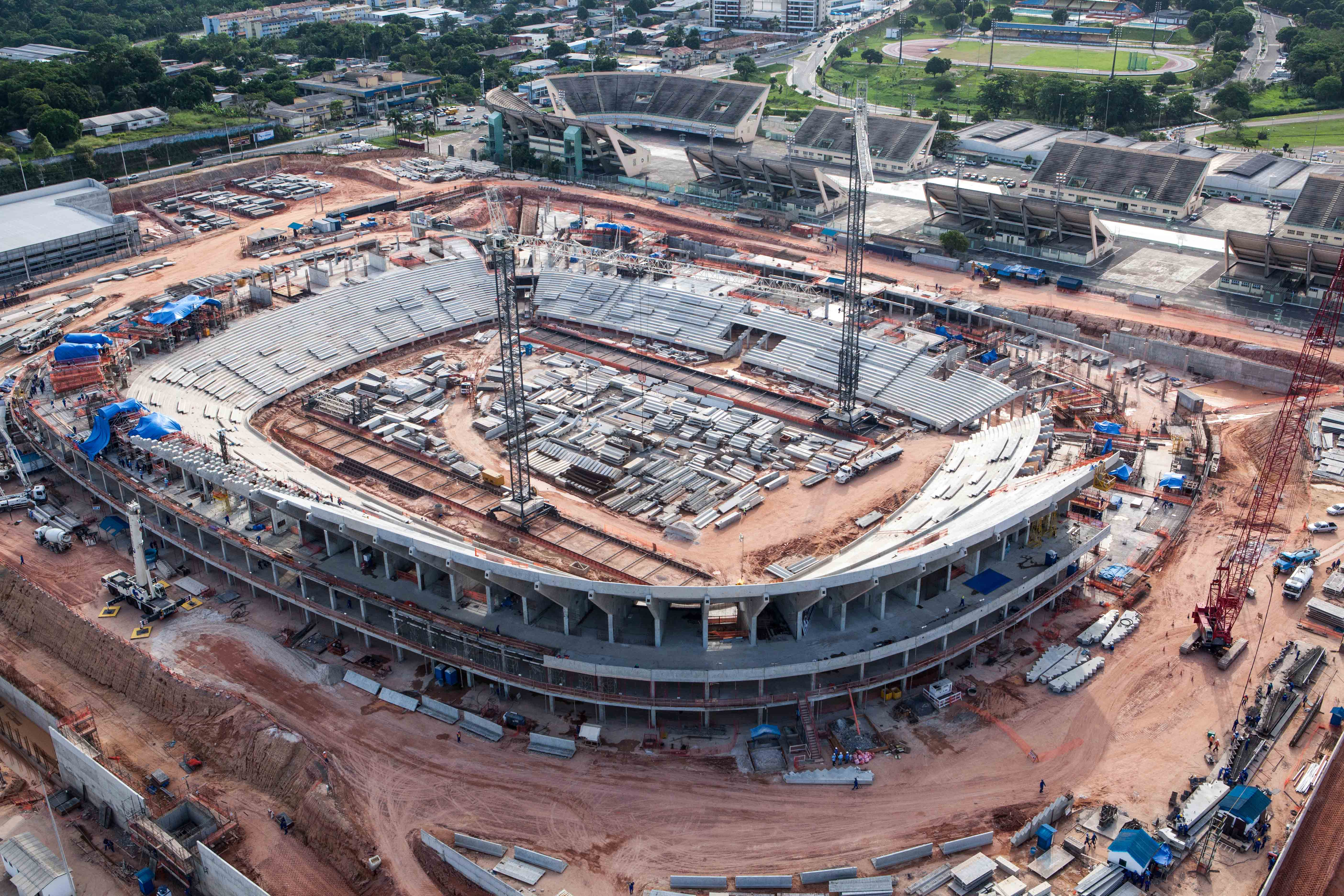
Arena da Amazônia (2012)

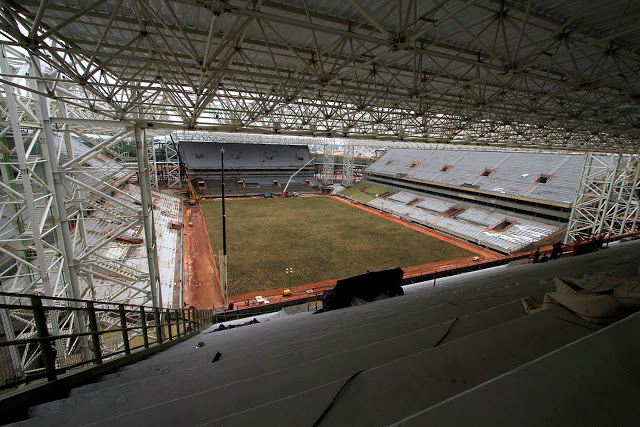
Arena Pantanal (2013)

== Teams' stay ==
Base camps were used by the 32 national squads to stay and train before and during the tournament. On 31 January 2014, FIFA announced the base camps for each participating team. The table below shows base camps and venues for each team.

Team	Base camp	Round 1	Round 2	Round 3	Round of 16	Quarter Final	Semi Final	Final/3rd
Algeria	Sorocaba (São Paulo)	Belo Horizonte	Porto Alegre	Curitiba	Porto Alegre			
Argentina	Vespasiano (Minas Gerais)	Rio de Janeiro	Belo Horizonte	Porto Alegre	São Paulo	Brasília	São Paulo	Rio de Janeiro
Australia	Vitória (Espírito Santo)	Cuiabá	Porto Alegre	Curitiba				
Belgium	Mogi das Cruzes (São Paulo)	Belo Horizonte	Rio de Janeiro	São Paulo	Salvador	Brasília		
Bosnia and Herzegovina	Guarujá (São Paulo)	Rio de Janeiro	Cuiabá	Salvador				
Brazil	Teresópolis (Rio de Janeiro)	São Paulo	Fortaleza	Brasília	Belo Horizonte	Fortaleza	Belo Horizonte	Brasília
Cameroon	Vitória (Espírito Santo)	Natal	Manaus	Brasília				
Chile	Belo Horizonte (Minas Gerais)	Cuiabá	Rio de Janeiro	São Paulo	Belo Horizonte			
Colombia	Cotia (São Paulo)	Belo Horizonte	Brasília	Cuiabá	Rio de Janeiro	Fortaleza		
Croatia	Mata de São João (Bahia)	São Paulo	Manaus	Recife				
Costa Rica	Santos (São Paulo)	Fortaleza	Recife	Belo Horizonte	Recife	Salvador		
Ecuador	Viamão (Rio Grande do Sul)	Brasília	Curitiba	Rio de Janeiro				
England	Royal Tulip Hotel, Sao Conrado, Rio de Janeiro (Rio de Janeiro)	Manaus	São Paulo	Belo Horizonte				
France	Ribeirão Preto (São Paulo)	Porto Alegre	Salvador	Rio de Janeiro	Brasília	Rio de Janeiro		
Germany	Campo Bahia, Santa Cruz Cabrália (Bahia)	Salvador	Fortaleza	Recife	Porto Alegre	Rio de Janeiro	Belo Horizonte	Rio de Janeiro
Ghana	Maceió (Alagoas)	Natal	Fortaleza	Brasília				
Greece	Aracaju (Sergipe)	Belo Horizonte	Natal	Fortaleza	Recife			
Honduras	Porto Feliz (São Paulo)	Porto Alegre	Curitiba	Manaus				
Iran	Guarulhos (São Paulo)	Curitiba	Belo Horizonte	Salvador				
Italy	Mangaratiba (Rio de Janeiro)	Manaus	Recife	Natal				
Ivory Coast	Águas de Lindoia (São Paulo)	Recife	Brasília	Fortaleza				
Japan	Itu (São Paulo)	Recife	Natal	Cuiabá				
Mexico	Santos (São Paulo)	Natal	Fortaleza	Recife	Fortaleza			
Netherlands	Rio de Janeiro (Rio de Janeiro)	Salvador	Porto Alegre	São Paulo	Fortaleza	Salvador	São Paulo	Brasília
Nigeria	Campinas (São Paulo)	Curitiba	Cuiaba	Porto Alegre	Brasília			
Portugal	Campinas (São Paulo)	Salvador	Manaus	Brasília				
Russia	Itu (São Paulo)	Cuiabá	Rio de Janeiro	Curitiba				
South Korea	Foz do Iguaçu (Paraná)	Cuiabá	Porto Alegre	São Paulo				
Spain	Curitiba (Paraná)	Salvador	Rio de Janeiro	Curitiba				
Switzerland	Porto Seguro (Bahia)	Brasília	Salvador	Manaus	São Paulo			
United States	São Paulo (São Paulo)	Natal	Manaus	Recife	Salvador			
Uruguay	Sete Lagoas (Minas Gerais)	Fortaleza	São Paulo	Natal	Rio de Janeiro			

== FIFA Fan Fests ==
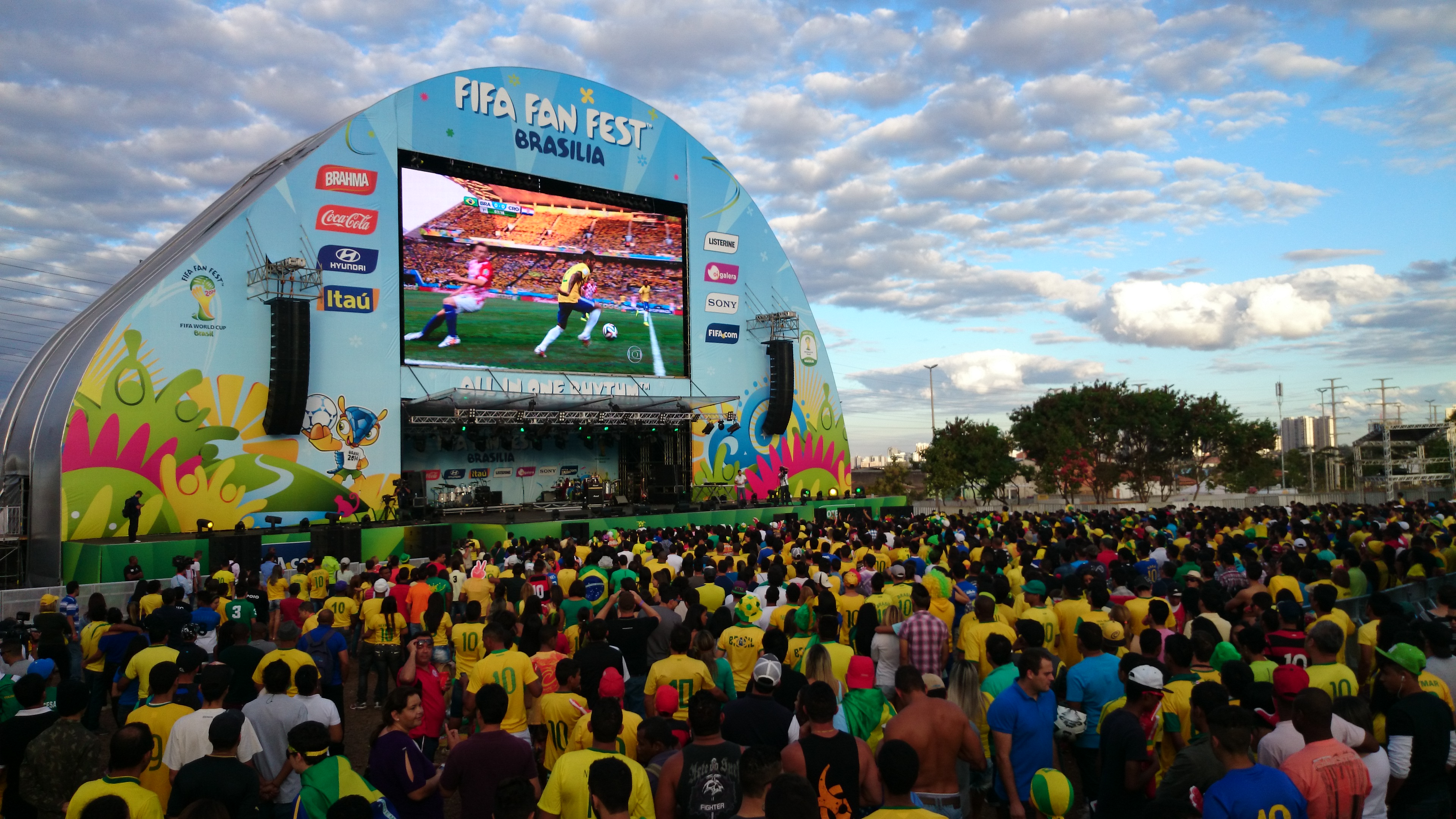
Fan fest in Brasilia, Brazil vs. Croatia

For a third consecutive World Cup tournament, FIFA announced they would be holding FIFA Fan Fests in each of the twelve host cities. Prominent examples are the Copacabana Beach in Rio de Janeiro, which had already held a Fan Fest in 2010, São Paulo's Vale do Anhangabaú and Brasília's Esplanada dos Ministérios, with the Congress in the background. The official "kick-off event" for the 2014 Fan Fest took place on Iracema Beach, in Fortaleza, on Sunday, June 8, 2014, according to FIFA's official website.

=== Locations ===
Brazil

- Rio de Janeiro – Praia de Copacabana (Copacabana Beach)
- São Paulo – Vale do Anhangabaú (Anhangabaú Valley)
- Brasília – Taguaparque (Taguatinga)
- Belo Horizonte – Expominas (Expominas Expositions Centre)
- Cuiabá – Parque de Exposições (Expositions Park)
- Curitiba – Pedreira Paulo Leminski (Paulo Leminski Quarry)
- Fortaleza – Praia de Iracema (Iracema Beach)
- Manaus – Praia Ponta Negra (Black Beach)
- Natal – Praia do Forte (Fort Beach)
- Porto Alegre – Anfiteatro Pôr-do-Sol (Sunset Amphitheatre)
- Recife – Cais da Alfândega (Customhouse Wharf)
- Salvador – Farol da Barra (Barra Lighthouse)

== Statistics ==
Goals scored from penalty shoot-outs are not counted.

Stadium	City	Capacity	Elevation	Matches played	Overall attendance	Average attendance per match	Average attendance as % of capacity	Overall goals scored	Average goals scored per match
Arena da Amazônia	Manaus	40,549	72 m	4	160,227	40,057	98.79%	14	3.50
Arena da Baixada	Curitiba	39,631	920 m	4	156,991	39,248	99.03%	8	2.00
Arena das Dunas	Natal	39,971	45 m	4	158,167	39,542	98.93%	5	1.25
Arena de São Paulo	São Paulo	63,321	792 m	6	375,593	62,599	98.86%	11	1.83
Arena Fonte Nova	Salvador	51,900	0 m	6	300,674	50,112	96.56%	24	4.00
Arena Pantanal	Cuiabá	41,112	165 m	4	158,717	39,679	96.52%	12	3.00
Arena Pernambuco	Recife	42,610	0 m	5	204,882	40,976	96.17%	11	2.20
Estádio Beira-Rio	Porto Alegre	43,394	47 m	5	214,969	42,994	99.08%	22	4.40
Estádio Castelão	Fortaleza	60,342	0 m	6	356,896	59,483	98.58%	17	2.83
Estádio do Maracanã	Rio de Janeiro	74,738	0 m	7	519,189	74,170	99.24%	10	1.43
Estádio Mineirão	Belo Horizonte	58,170	800 m	6	345,350	57,558	98.95%	17	2.13
Estádio Nacional	Brasília	69,349	1172 m	7	478,218	68,317	98.51%	20	2.86
Total		3,486,079		64	3,429,873	53,592	98.39%	171	2.67
