= 2014 FIFA World Cup =

Association football tournament in Brazil

Copa do Mundo da FIFA Brasil 2014 (Portuguese)

Tournament details
- Host country: Brazil
- Dates: 12 June – 13 July
- Teams: 32 (from 5 confederations)
- Venues: 12 (in 12 host cities)

Final positions
- Champions: Germany (4th title)
- Runners-up: Argentina
- Third place: Netherlands
- Fourth place: Brazil

Tournament statistics
- Matches played: 64
- Goals scored: 171 (2.67 per match)
- Attendance: 3,429,873 (53,592 per match)
- Top scorer(s): (Colombia) James Rodríguez (6 goals)
- Best player: (Argentina) Lionel Messi
- Best young player: (France) Paul Pogba
- Best goalkeeper: (Germany) Manuel Neuer
- Fair play award: Colombia

The 2014 FIFA World Cup (Portuguese: Copa do Mundo da FIFA Brasil 2014) was the 20th FIFA World Cup, the quadrennial world championship for men's national football teams organised by FIFA. It took place in Brazil from 12 June to 13 July 2014, after the country was awarded the hosting rights in 2007. It was the second time that Brazil staged the competition, the first being in 1950, and the fifth time that it was held in South America.

Thirty-one national teams advanced through qualification competitions to join the host nation in the final tournament (with Bosnia and Herzegovina as the only debutant). A total of 64 matches were played in 12 venues located in as many host cities across Brazil. For the first time at a World Cup finals, match officials used goal-line technology, as well as vanishing spray for free kicks. FIFA Fan Fests in each host city gathered a total of 5 million people, and the country received 1 million visitors from 202 countries. Spain, the defending champions, were eliminated at the group stage. Host nation Brazil, who had won the 2013 FIFA Confederations Cup, lost to Germany 7–1 in the semi-finals and eventually finished in fourth place.

In the final, Germany defeated Argentina 1–0 after extra time following a half-volley goal by Mario Götze in the 113th minute of the final to win the tournament and secure the country's fourth world title, the first after German reunification in 1990, when as West Germany they also beat Argentina by the same score in 90 minutes in the World Cup final. It was Germany's first major tournament win since UEFA Euro 1996. Germany became the first European team to win the World Cup in the Americas, and this result marked the third consecutive title won by a European team, after Italy in 2006 and Spain in 2010, a record-breaking streak by the teams from the same continent continued by France four years later. (Note: Alternatively, if one accepts the claim that the football tournaments at the 1924 and 1928 Summer Olympics should be counted as the first association football world championships, then in 2014 European teams repeated the three wins in a row streak achieved by South Americans earlier, as the two Olympic football tournaments and the first edition of the FIFA World Cup in 1930 were won by Uruguay.)

== Host selection ==
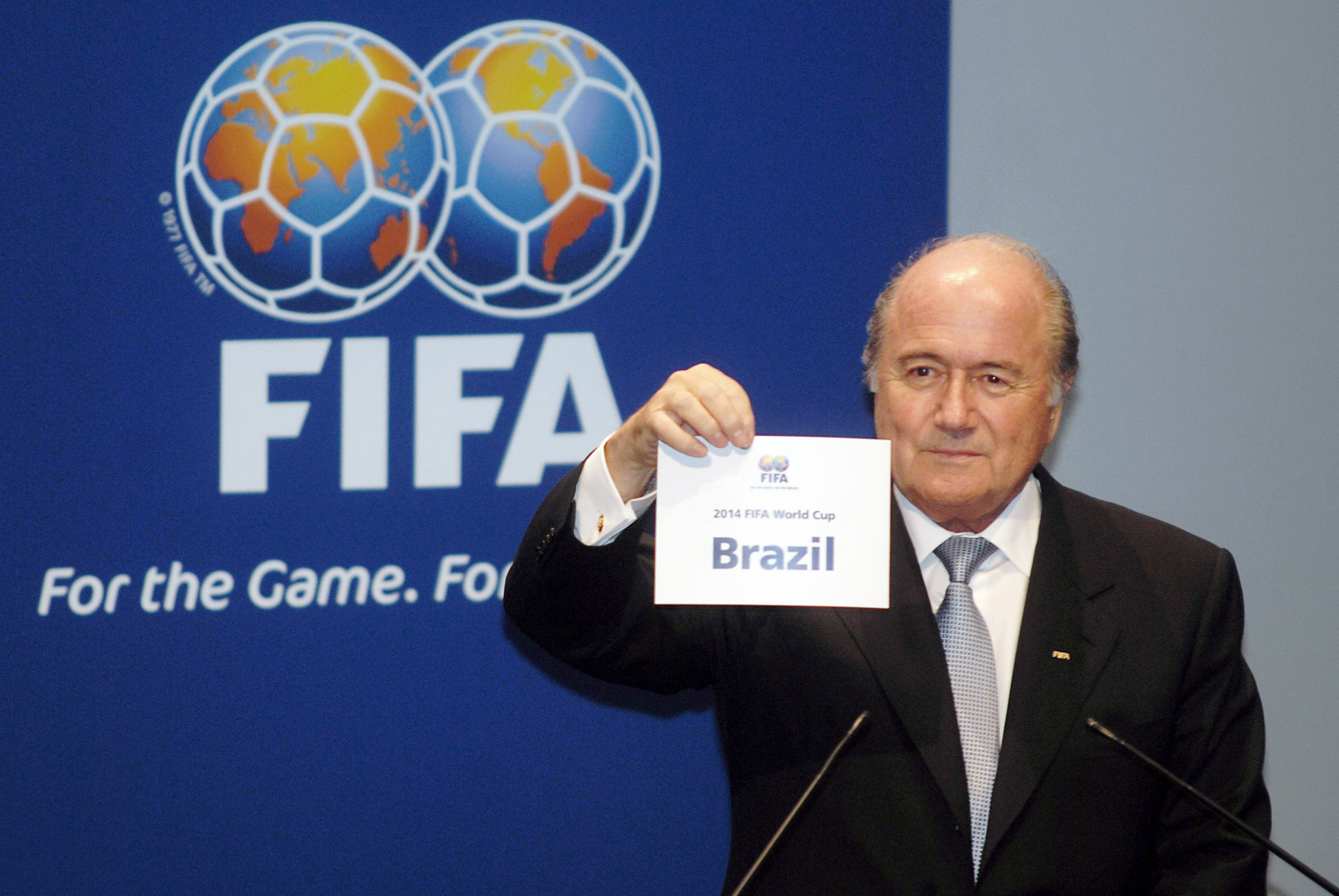
FIFA president Sepp Blatter announces Brazil as hosts, 30 October 2007

In March 2003, FIFA announced that the tournament would be held in South America for the first time since 1978, in line with its policy at the time of rotating the right to host the World Cup among different confederations. With the 2010 FIFA World Cup hosted in South Africa, it would be the second consecutive World Cup outside Europe, which was a first for the tournament. It was also sixth time (second consecutive) in the Southern Hemisphere. Only Brazil and Colombia formally declared their candidacy but, after the withdrawal of the latter from the process, Brazil was officially elected as host nation unopposed on 30 October 2007.

== Participating teams and officials ==
=== Qualification ===
Qualification was held between June 2011 and November 2013. Twenty-four of the 32 qualifiers were returning participants from the 2010 World Cup.

- Bosnia and Herzegovina were the only team with no previous appearance at the World Cup. (Note: Bosnia and Herzegovina was until 1992 part of Yugoslavia, which competed at eight World Cup tournaments.)
- Colombia qualified for the World Cup after 16 years of absence.
- Belgium and Russia both returned after 12 years. This would be the last time Russia qualified for a World Cup through the qualification campaign, qualifying automatically for 2018 as hosts before being banned starting in 2022.
- This was also the first World Cup for 32 years that did not feature a representative from the Nordic countries.
- Iran, Costa Rica, Ecuador, and Croatia returned after missing the previous tournament in 2010.
- The highest ranked team not to qualify was Ukraine (ranked 16th), while the lowest ranked team that did qualify was Australia (ranked 62nd).
- As of 2026, this was the last time Italy, Chile, Greece, and Honduras appeared in a FIFA World Cup.

The following 32 teams – shown with their last pre-tournament FIFA world ranking – qualified for the final tournament.

AFC (4)

- Australia (62)
- Iran (43)
- Japan (46)
- South Korea (57)

CAF (5)

- Algeria (22)
- Cameroon (56)
- Ghana (37)
- Ivory Coast (23)
- Nigeria (44)

OFC (0)

- None qualified

CONCACAF (4)

- Costa Rica (28)
- Honduras (33)
- Mexico (20)
- United States (13)

CONMEBOL (6)

- Argentina (5)
- Brazil (3) (hosts)
- Chile (14)
- Colombia (8)
- Ecuador (26)
- Uruguay (7)

UEFA (13)

- Belgium (11)
- Bosnia and Herzegovina (21) (debut)
- Croatia (18)
- England (10)
- France (17)
- Germany (2)
- Greece (12)
- Italy (9)
- Netherlands (15)
- Portugal (4)
- Russia (19)
- Spain (1)
- Switzerland (6)

Qualified Did not qualify Did not enter Not a FIFA member

=== Final draw ===
The draw took place on 6 December 2013 at the Costa do Sauípe resort in Bahia, during which the teams were drawn by various past World Cup-winning players. Hosted by TV presentators Fernanda Lima and Rodrigo Hilbert and conducted by the FIFA general secretary Jérôme Valcke, the draw featured football celebrities from all FIFA World Cup champion countries such as Cafu (Brazil), Fabio Cannavaro (Italy), Lothar Matthäus (Germany), Zinedine Zidane (France), Mario Kempes (Argentina), Fernando Hierro (Spain), Geoff Hurst (England) and Alcides Ghiggia (Uruguay).

The 32 participating teams were drawn into eight groups. In preparation for this, the teams were organised into four pots with the seven highest-ranked teams joining host nation Brazil in the seeded pot. As with the previous tournaments, FIFA aimed to create groups which maximised geographic separation and therefore the unseeded teams were arranged into pots based on geographic considerations. Under the draw procedure, one randomly drawn team – Italy – was firstly relocated from Pot 4 to Pot 2 to create four equal pots of eight teams.

Group A	Group B	Group C	Group D
Brazil	Spain	Colombia	Uruguay
Croatia	Netherlands	Greece	Costa Rica
Mexico	Chile	Ivory Coast	England
Cameroon	Australia	Japan	Italy
Group E	Group F	Group G	Group H
Switzerland	Argentina	Germany	Belgium
Ecuador	Bosnia and Herzegovina	Portugal	Algeria
France	Iran	Ghana	Russia
Honduras	Nigeria	United States	South Korea

=== Officials ===
In March 2013, FIFA published a list of 52 prospective referees, each paired, on the basis of nationality, with two linesmen, from all six football confederations for the tournament. On 14 January 2014, the FIFA Referees Committee appointed 25 referee trios and eight support duos representing 43 countries for the tournament. Yuichi Nishimura from Japan acted as referee in the opening match whereas Nicola Rizzoli from Italy acted as referee in the final.

List of officials
Confederation	Referee	Assistants		Support (referee/assist)
AFC	Ravshan Irmatov (Uzbekistan)	Abdukhamidullo Rasulov (Uzbekistan)	Bakhadyr Kochkarov (Kyrgyzstan)	Alireza Faghani (Iran) / Hassan Kamranifar (Iran)
AFC	Yuichi Nishimura (Japan)	Toru Sagara (Japan)	Toshiyuki Nagi (Japan)	Alireza Faghani (Iran) / Hassan Kamranifar (Iran)
AFC	Nawaf Shukralla (Bahrain)	Yaser Tulefat (Bahrain)	Ebrahim Saleh (Bahrain)	Alireza Faghani (Iran) / Hassan Kamranifar (Iran)
AFC	Ben Williams (Australia)	Matthew Cream (Australia)	Hakan Anaz (Australia)	Alireza Faghani (Iran) / Hassan Kamranifar (Iran)
CAF	Noumandiez Doué (Ivory Coast)	Songuifolo Yeo (Ivory Coast)	Jean-Claude Birumushahu (Burundi)	Néant Alioum (Cameroon) / Djibril Camara (Senegal)
CAF	Bakary Gassama (Gambia)	Evarist Menkouande (Cameroon)	Félicien Kabanda (Rwanda)	Néant Alioum (Cameroon) / Djibril Camara (Senegal)
CAF	Djamel Haimoudi (Algeria)	Redouane Achik (Morocco)	Abdelhak Etchiali (Algeria)	Néant Alioum (Cameroon) / Djibril Camara (Senegal)
CONCACAF	Joel Aguilar (El Salvador)	William Torres (El Salvador)	Juan Zumba (El Salvador)	Roberto Moreno (Panama) / Eric Boria (United States); Walter López (Guatemala) / Leonel Leal (Costa Rica)
CONCACAF	Mark Geiger (United States)	Mark Hurd (United States)	Joe Fletcher (Canada)	Roberto Moreno (Panama) / Eric Boria (United States); Walter López (Guatemala) / Leonel Leal (Costa Rica)
CONCACAF	Marco Rodríguez (Mexico)	Marvin Torrentera (Mexico)	Marcos Quintero (Mexico)	Roberto Moreno (Panama) / Eric Boria (United States); Walter López (Guatemala) / Leonel Leal (Costa Rica)
CONMEBOL	Néstor Pitana (Argentina)	Hernán Maidana (Argentina)	Juan Pablo Belatti (Argentina)	Víctor Hugo Carrillo (Peru) / Rodney Aquino (Paraguay)
CONMEBOL	Sandro Ricci (Brazil)	Emerson De Carvalho (Brazil)	Marcelo Van Gasse (Brazil)	Víctor Hugo Carrillo (Peru) / Rodney Aquino (Paraguay)
CONMEBOL	Enrique Osses (Chile)	Carlos Astroza (Chile)	Sergio Román (Chile)	Víctor Hugo Carrillo (Peru) / Rodney Aquino (Paraguay)
CONMEBOL	Wilmar Roldán (Colombia)	Humberto Clavijo (Colombia)	Eduardo Díaz (Colombia)	Víctor Hugo Carrillo (Peru) / Rodney Aquino (Paraguay)
CONMEBOL	Carlos Vera (Ecuador)	Christian Lescano (Ecuador)	Byron Romero (Ecuador)	Víctor Hugo Carrillo (Peru) / Rodney Aquino (Paraguay)
OFC	Peter O'Leary (New Zealand)	Jan Hendrik Hintz (New Zealand)	Mark Rule (New Zealand)	Norbert Hauata (Tahiti) / Aden Marwa (Kenya)
UEFA	Felix Brych (Germany)	Mark Borsch (Germany)	Stefan Lupp (Germany)	Svein Oddvar Moen (Norway) / Kim Haglund (Norway)
UEFA	Cüneyt Çakır (Turkey)	Bahattin Duran (Turkey)	Tarık Ongun (Turkey)	Svein Oddvar Moen (Norway) / Kim Haglund (Norway)
UEFA	Jonas Eriksson (Sweden)	Mathias Klasenius (Sweden)	Daniel Wärnmark (Sweden)	Svein Oddvar Moen (Norway) / Kim Haglund (Norway)
UEFA	Björn Kuipers (Netherlands)	Sander van Roekel (Netherlands)	Erwin Zeinstra (Netherlands)	Svein Oddvar Moen (Norway) / Kim Haglund (Norway)
UEFA	Milorad Mažić (Serbia)	Milovan Ristić (Serbia)	Dalibor Đurđević (Serbia)	Svein Oddvar Moen (Norway) / Kim Haglund (Norway)
UEFA	Pedro Proença (Portugal)	Bertino Miranda (Portugal)	Tiago Trigo (Portugal)	Svein Oddvar Moen (Norway) / Kim Haglund (Norway)
UEFA	Nicola Rizzoli (Italy)	Renato Faverani (Italy)	Andrea Stefani (Italy)	Svein Oddvar Moen (Norway) / Kim Haglund (Norway)
UEFA	Carlos Velasco Carballo (Spain)	Roberto Alonso Fernández (Spain)	Juan Carlos Yuste Jiménez (Spain)	Svein Oddvar Moen (Norway) / Kim Haglund (Norway)
UEFA	Howard Webb (England)	Michael Mullarkey (England)	Darren Cann (England)	Svein Oddvar Moen (Norway) / Kim Haglund (Norway)

== Squads ==
As with the 2010 tournament, each team's squad consisted of 23 players (three of whom must be goalkeepers). Each participating national association had to confirm their final 23-player squad no later than 10 days before the start of the tournament. Teams were permitted to make late replacements in the event of serious injury, at any time up to 24 hours before their first game. During a match, all remaining squad members not named in the starting team were available to be one of the three permitted substitutions (provided the player was not serving a suspension).

== Venues ==
Location of the host cities of the 2014 FIFA World Cup in Brazil

12 venues (seven new and five renovated) in twelve cities were selected for the tournament. The venues covered all the main regions of Brazil and created more evenly distributed hosting than the 1950 finals in Brazil. Consequently, the tournament required long-distance travel for teams. During the World Cup, Brazilian cities were also home to the participating teams at 32 separate base camps, as well as staging official fan fests where supporters could view the games.

Of the six stadiums that staged matches in the 1950 edition, only the Estádio do Maracanã in Rio de Janeiro was reused in 2014. Although the other five venues did not return, each of their respective host cities did, doing so with different stadiums. For 2014, the most-used venues were the Maracanã and the new Estádio Nacional in Brasília, hosting seven matches each. The least-used venues were those in Cuiabá, Curitiba, Manaus, and Natal, which only staged four each. Furthermore, as the four smallest stadiums at the tournament, they did not host any matches in the knockout stage.

Rio de Janeiro	Brasília	São Paulo	Fortaleza
Estádio do Maracanã	Estádio Nacional	Arena Corinthians (Arena de São Paulo)	Estádio Castelão
Capacity: 74,738	Capacity: 69,432	Capacity: 63,321	Capacity: 60,348
Belo Horizonte	Salvador	Porto Alegre	Recife (Note: The Arena Pernambuco is located in São Lourenço da Mata, Pernambuco.)
Estádio Mineirão	Arena Fonte Nova	Estádio Beira-Rio	Arena Pernambuco
Capacity: 58,259	Capacity: 51,708	Capacity: 43,394	Capacity: 42,583
Cuiabá	Manaus	Natal	Curitiba
Arena Pantanal	Arena da Amazônia	Arena das Dunas	Arena da Baixada
Capacity: 41,112	Capacity: 40,549	Capacity: 39,971	Capacity: 39,631

=== Team base camps ===
Base camps were used by the 32 national squads to stay and train before and during the World Cup tournament. On 31 January 2014, FIFA announced the base camps for each participating team, having earlier circulated a brochure of 84 prospective locations. Most teams opted to stay in the Southeast Region of Brazil, with only eight teams choosing other regions; five teams (Croatia, Germany, Ghana, Greece and Switzerland) opted to stay in the Northeast Region and three teams (Ecuador, South Korea and Spain) opted to stay in the South Region. None opted to stay in the North Region or the Central-West Region. Campo Bahia, the base camp of the eventual champion Germany, attracted much interest.

National squads' base camps

Team	City
Algeria	Sorocaba, SP
Argentina	Vespasiano, MG
Australia	Vitória, ES
Belgium	Mogi das Cruzes, SP
Bosnia and Herzegovina	Guarujá, SP
Brazil	Teresópolis, RJ
Cameroon	Vitória, ES
Chile	Belo Horizonte, MG
Colombia	Cotia, SP
Costa Rica	Santos, SP
Croatia	Mata de São João, BA
Ecuador	Viamão, RS
England	Rio de Janeiro, RJ
France	Ribeirão Preto, SP
Germany	Campo Bahia, BA
Ghana	Maceió, AL

Team	City
Greece	Aracaju, SE
Honduras	Porto Feliz, SP
Iran	Guarulhos, SP
Italy	Mangaratiba, RJ
Ivory Coast	Águas de Lindoia, SP
Japan	Itu, SP
South Korea	Foz do Iguaçu, PR
Mexico	Santos, SP
Netherlands	Rio de Janeiro, RJ
Nigeria	Campinas, SP
Portugal	Campinas, SP
Russia	Itu, SP
Spain	Curitiba, PR
Switzerland	Porto Seguro, BA
United States	São Paulo, SP
Uruguay	Sete Lagoas, MG

=== FIFA Fan Fests ===
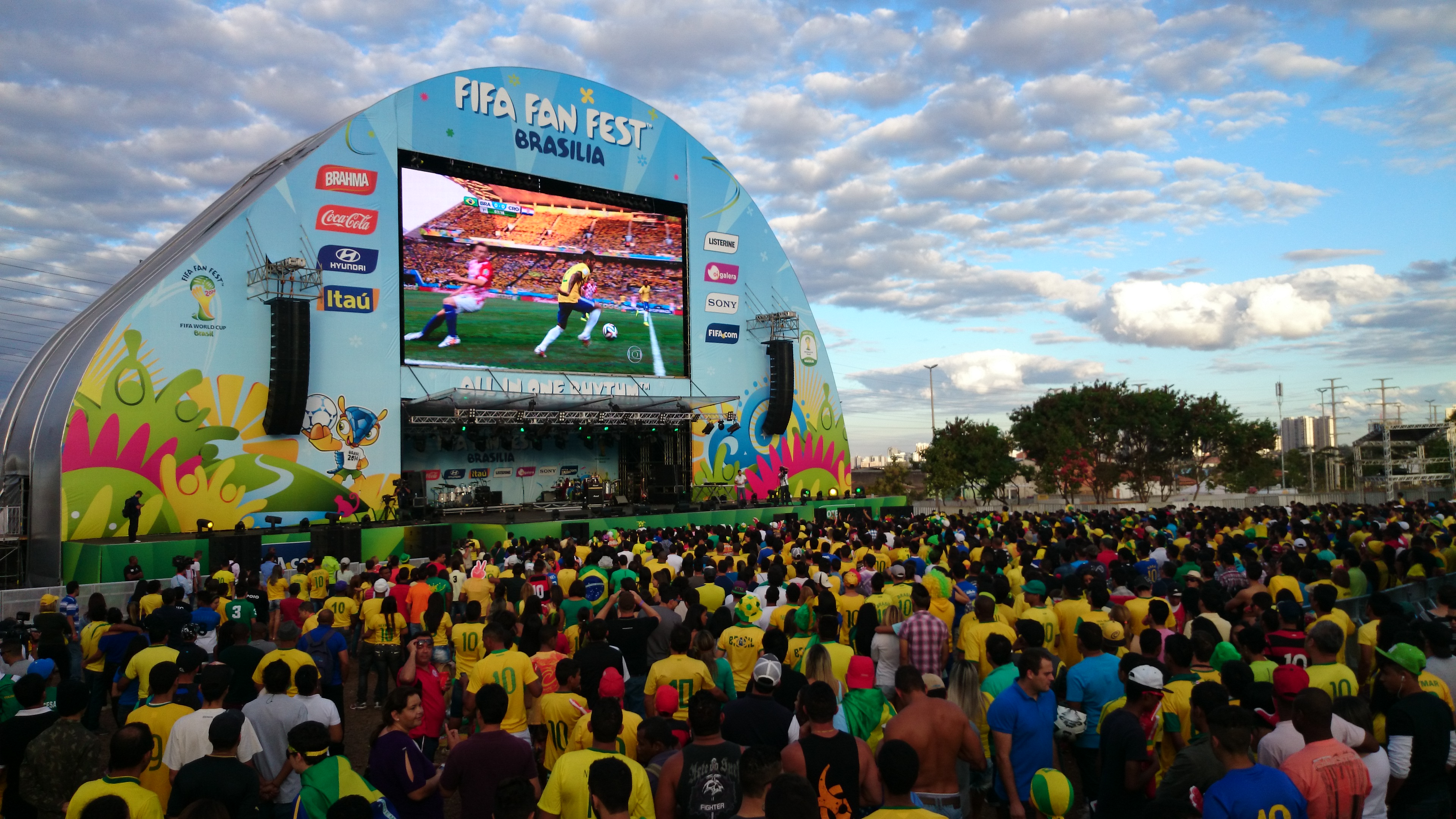
Brazilian fans at the FIFA Fan Fest in Brasília

For a third consecutive World Cup tournament, FIFA staged FIFA Fan Fests in each of the 12 host cities throughout the competition. Prominent examples were the Copacabana Beach in Rio de Janeiro, which already held a Fan Fest in 2010, and São Paulo's Vale do Anhangabaú. The first official event took place on Iracema Beach, in Fortaleza, on 8 June 2014.

== Innovations ==
=== Technologies ===
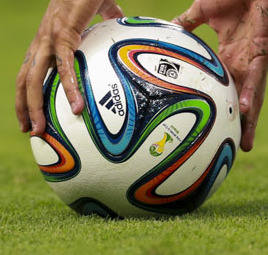
Adidas Brazuca the official ball used during most of the matches.

In order to avoid ghost goals, the 2014 World Cup introduced goal-line technology following successful trials at, among other competitions, the 2013 Confederations Cup. The chosen Goal Control system featured 14 high speed cameras, 7 directed to each of the goals. Data were sent to the central image-processing centre, where a virtual representation of the ball was output on a widescreen to confirm the goal. The referee was equipped with a watch which vibrated and displayed a signal upon a goal. France's second goal in their group game against Honduras was the first time goal-line technology was needed to confirm that a goal should be given.

Following successful trials, (Note: The spray was trialled at the 2013 FIFA U-20 World Cup, 2013 FIFA U-17 World Cup and 2013 FIFA Club World Cup) FIFA approved the use of vanishing spray by the referees for the first time at a World Cup Finals. The water-based spray, which disappears within minutes of application, can be used to mark a ten-yard line for the defending team during a free kick and also to draw where the ball is to be placed for a free kick.

The Adidas Brazuca was the official match ball of the 2014 FIFA World Cup and was supplied by Forward Sports of Sialkot, Pakistan. Adidas created a new design of ball after criticisms of the Adidas Jabulani used in the previous World Cup. The number of panels was reduced to six, with the panels being thermally bonded. This created a ball with increased consistency and aerodynamics compared to its predecessor. Furthermore, Adidas underwent an extensive testing process lasting more than two years to produce a ball that would meet the approval of football professionals.

=== Cooling breaks ===
Due to the relatively high ambient temperatures in Brazil, particularly at the northern venues, cooling breaks for the players were introduced. Breaks could take place at the referee's discretion after the 30th minute of each half if the Wet Bulb Globe Temperature exceeded 32 °C (90 °F); the breaks would last 3 minutes, with this time made up by an extended period of stoppage time at the end of the half.

The first cooling break in a World Cup play took place during the 32nd minute of the match between the Netherlands and Mexico in the round of 16. At the start of the match, FIFA listed the temperature at 32 °C (90 °F) with 68% humidity.

=== Anti-doping ===
The biological passport was introduced in the FIFA World Cup starting in 2014. Blood and urine samples collected from all players before the competition, and from two players per team per match, were analysed by the Swiss Laboratory for Doping Analyses. FIFA reported that 91.5% of the players taking part in the tournament were tested before the start of the competition and none tested positive. However, FIFA was criticised for how it conducted doping tests.

== Format ==
The first round, or group stage, was a competition between the 32 teams divided among eight groups of four, where each group engaged in a round-robin tournament within itself. The two highest ranked teams in each group advanced to the knockout stage. Teams were awarded three points for a win and one for a draw. When comparing teams in a group over-all result came before head-to-head.

Tie-breaking criteria for group play
The ranking of teams in each group was based on the following criteria:
1. Number of points
2. Goal difference
3. Number of goals scored
4. Number of points obtained in matches between tied teams
5. Goal difference in matches between tied teams
6. Number of goals scored in matches between tied teams
7. Drawing of lots

In the knockout stage there were four rounds (round of 16, quarter-finals, semi-finals, and the final), with each eliminating the losers. The two semi-final losers competed in a match for third place. For any match in the knockout stage, a draw after 90 minutes of regulation time was followed by two 15 minute periods of extra time to determine a winner. If the teams were still tied, a penalty shoot-out was held to determine a winner.

The match schedule was announced on 20 October 2011 with the kick-off times being confirmed on 27 September 2012; after the final draw, the kick-off times of seven matches were adjusted by FIFA. The competition was organised so that teams that played each other in the group stage could not meet again during the knockout phase until the final (or the match for third place). The group stage began on 12 June, with the host nation competing in the opening game as has been the format since the 2006 tournament. The opening game was preceded by an opening ceremony that began at 15:15 local time.

== Opening ceremony ==
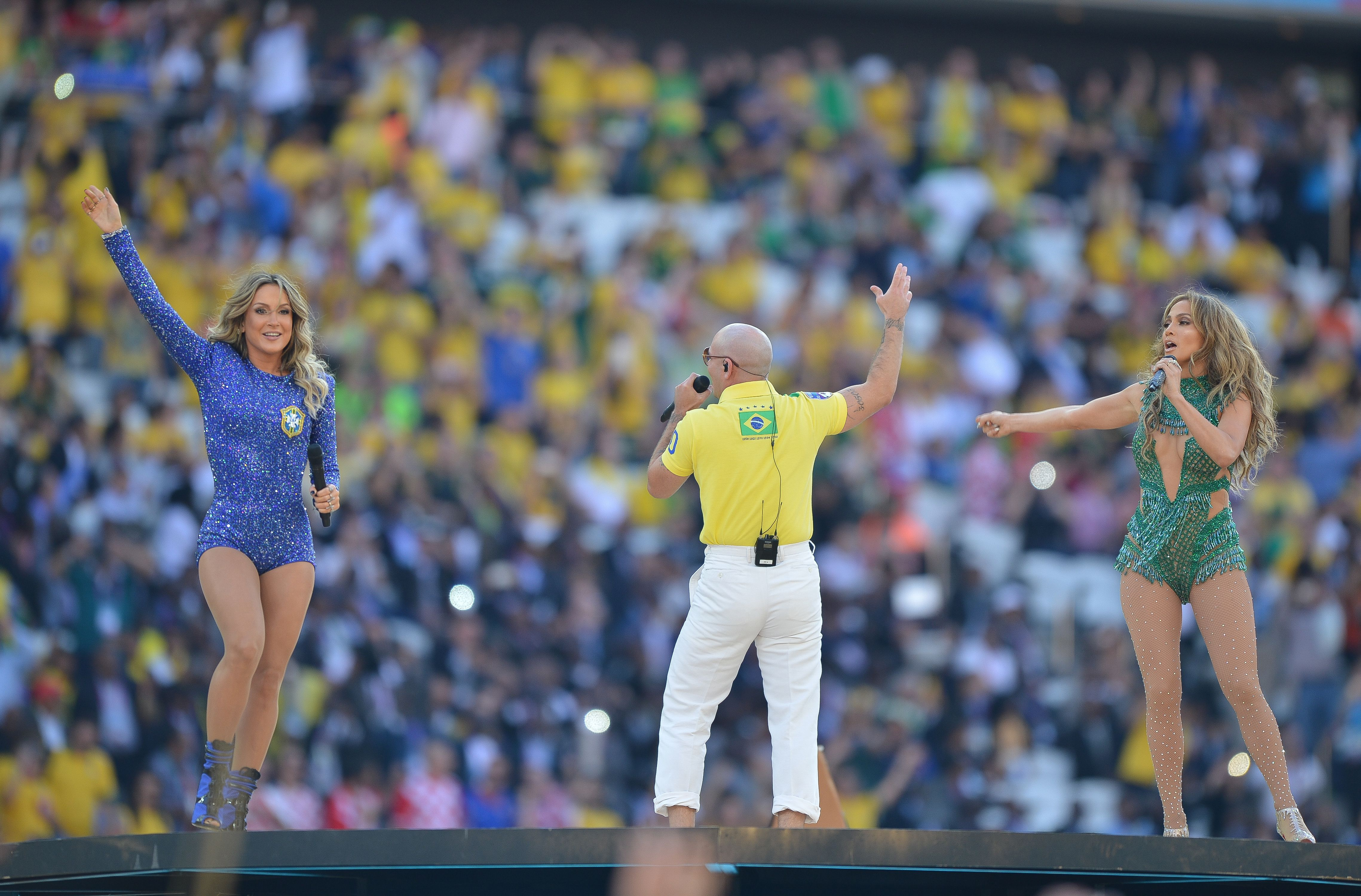
From left to right: Claudia Leitte, Pitbull, and Jennifer Lopez performing at the opening ceremony at the Arena de São Paulo, São Paulo.

On 12 June 2014, the 20th edition of the FIFA World Cup began with the opening ceremony at Arena de São Paulo, São Paulo, Brazil. The event saw 660 dancers take to the stadium and perform in a ceremony which celebrated the nature of the country and its love of football. Following the dancers native singer Claudia Leitte emerged on centre stage to perform for the crowd. She was later joined by Cuban-American rapper Pitbull, and American singer Jennifer Lopez to perform the tournament's official song "We Are One (Ole Ola)" which had been released as an official single on 8 April 2014. Following the ceremony, the opening match was played, which saw the hosts come from behind to beat Croatia 3–1.

== Group stage ==
The group stage of the cup took place in Brazil from 12 June 2014 to 26 June 2014: each team played three games. The group stage was notable for a scarcity of draws and a large number of goals. The first drawn (and goalless) match did not occur until the 13th match of the tournament, between Iran and Nigeria: a drought longer than any World Cup since 1930. The group stage produced a total of 136 goals (an average of 2.83 goals per match), nine fewer than were scored during the entire 2010 tournament. This is the largest number of goals in the group stage since the 32-team system was implemented in 1998 and the largest average in a group stage since 1958. World Cup holders Spain were eliminated after only two games, the quickest exit for the defending champions since Italy's from the 1950 tournament. Spain also became the fourth nation to be eliminated in the first round while holding the World Cup crown, the first one being Italy in 1950 (and again in 2010), Brazil in 1966, and France in 2002. For the first time, two teams from Africa advanced to the second round, a feat that would be repeated in the 2022 tournament.

=== Group A ===
Pos	Team	Pld	W	D	L	GF	GA	GD	Pts	Qualification
1	Brazil (H)	3	2	1	0	7	2	+5	7	Advance to knockout stage
2	Mexico	3	2	1	0	4	1	+3	7	Advance to knockout stage
3	Croatia	3	1	0	2	6	6	0	3	
4	Cameroon	3	0	0	3	1	9	−8	0	

Source: FIFA
(H) Hosts

12 June 2014
Brazil	3–1	Croatia	Arena de São Paulo, São Paulo
13 June 2014
Mexico	1–0	Cameroon	Arena das Dunas, Natal
17 June 2014
Brazil	0–0	Mexico	Estádio Castelão, Fortaleza
18 June 2014
Cameroon	0–4	Croatia	Arena da Amazônia, Manaus
23 June 2014
Cameroon	1–4	Brazil	Estádio Nacional Mané Garrincha, Brasília
Croatia	1–3	Mexico	Itaipava Arena Pernambuco, Recife

=== Group B ===
Pos	Team	Pld	W	D	L	GF	GA	GD	Pts	Qualification
1	Netherlands	3	3	0	0	10	3	+7	9	Advance to knockout stage
2	Chile	3	2	0	1	5	3	+2	6	Advance to knockout stage
3	Spain	3	1	0	2	4	7	−3	3	
4	Australia	3	0	0	3	3	9	−6	0	

Source: FIFA

13 June 2014
Spain	1–5	Netherlands	Itaipava Arena Fonte Nova, Salvador
Chile	3–1	Australia	Arena Pantanal, Cuiabá
18 June 2014
Australia	2–3	Netherlands	Estádio Beira-Rio, Porto Alegre
Spain	0–2	Chile	Estádio do Maracanã, Rio de Janeiro
23 June 2014
Australia	0–3	Spain	Arena da Baixada, Curitiba
Netherlands	2–0	Chile	Arena de São Paulo, São Paulo

=== Group C ===
Pos	Team	Pld	W	D	L	GF	GA	GD	Pts	Qualification
1	Colombia	3	3	0	0	9	2	+7	9	Advance to knockout stage
2	Greece	3	1	1	1	2	4	−2	4	Advance to knockout stage
3	Ivory Coast	3	1	0	2	4	5	−1	3	
4	Japan	3	0	1	2	2	6	−4	1	

Source: FIFA

14 June 2014
Colombia	3–0	Greece	Estádio Mineirão, Belo Horizonte
Ivory Coast	2–1	Japan	Itaipava Arena Pernambuco, Recife
19 June 2014
Colombia	2–1	Ivory Coast	Estádio Nacional Mané Garrincha, Brasília
Japan	0–0	Greece	Arena das Dunas, Natal
24 June 2014
Japan	1–4	Colombia	Arena Pantanal, Cuiabá
Greece	2–1	Ivory Coast	Estádio Castelão, Fortaleza

=== Group D ===
Pos	Team	Pld	W	D	L	GF	GA	GD	Pts	Qualification
1	Costa Rica	3	2	1	0	4	1	+3	7	Advance to knockout stage
2	Uruguay	3	2	0	1	4	4	0	6	Advance to knockout stage
3	Italy	3	1	0	2	2	3	−1	3	
4	England	3	0	1	2	2	4	−2	1	

Source: FIFA

14 June 2014
Uruguay	1–3	Costa Rica	Estádio Castelão, Fortaleza
England	1–2	Italy	Arena da Amazônia, Manaus
19 June 2014
Uruguay	2–1	England	Arena de São Paulo, São Paulo
20 June 2014
Italy	0–1	Costa Rica	Itaipava Arena Pernambuco, Recife
24 June 2014
Italy	0–1	Uruguay	Arena das Dunas, Natal
Costa Rica	0–0	England	Estádio Mineirão, Belo Horizonte

=== Group E ===
Pos	Team	Pld	W	D	L	GF	GA	GD	Pts	Qualification
1	France	3	2	1	0	8	2	+6	7	Advance to knockout stage
2	Switzerland	3	2	0	1	7	6	+1	6	Advance to knockout stage
3	Ecuador	3	1	1	1	3	3	0	4	
4	Honduras	3	0	0	3	1	8	−7	0	

Source: FIFA

15 June 2014
Switzerland	2–1	Ecuador	Estádio Nacional Mané Garrincha, Brasília
France	3–0	Honduras	Estádio Beira-Rio, Porto Alegre
20 June 2014
Switzerland	2–5	France	Itaipava Arena Fonte Nova, Salvador
Honduras	1–2	Ecuador	Arena da Baixada, Curitiba
25 June 2014
Honduras	0–3	Switzerland	Arena da Amazônia, Manaus
Ecuador	0–0	France	Estádio do Maracanã, Rio de Janeiro

=== Group F ===
Pos	Team	Pld	W	D	L	GF	GA	GD	Pts	Qualification
1	Argentina	3	3	0	0	6	3	+3	9	Advance to knockout stage
2	Nigeria	3	1	1	1	3	3	0	4	Advance to knockout stage
3	Bosnia and Herzegovina	3	1	0	2	4	4	0	3	
4	Iran	3	0	1	2	1	4	−3	1	

Source: FIFA

15 June 2014
Argentina	2–1	Bosnia and Herzegovina	Estádio do Maracanã, Rio de Janeiro
16 June 2014
Iran	0–0	Nigeria	Arena da Baixada, Curitiba
21 June 2014
Argentina	1–0	Iran	Estádio Mineirão, Belo Horizonte
Nigeria	1–0	Bosnia and Herzegovina	Arena Pantanal, Cuiabá
25 June 2014
Nigeria	2–3	Argentina	Estádio Beira-Rio, Porto Alegre
Bosnia and Herzegovina	3–1	Iran	Itaipava Arena Fonte Nova, Salvador

=== Group G ===
Pos	Team	Pld	W	D	L	GF	GA	GD	Pts	Qualification
1	Germany	3	2	1	0	7	2	+5	7	Advance to knockout stage
2	United States	3	1	1	1	4	4	0	4	Advance to knockout stage
3	Portugal	3	1	1	1	4	7	−3	4	
4	Ghana	3	0	1	2	4	6	−2	1	

Source: FIFA

16 June 2014
Germany	4–0	Portugal	Itaipava Arena Fonte Nova, Salvador
Ghana	1–2	United States	Arena das Dunas, Natal
21 June 2014
Germany	2–2	Ghana	Estádio Castelão, Fortaleza
22 June 2014
United States	2–2	Portugal	Arena da Amazônia, Manaus
26 June 2014
United States	0–1	Germany	Itaipava Arena Pernambuco, Recife
Portugal	2–1	Ghana	Estádio Nacional Mané Garrincha, Brasília

=== Group H ===
Pos	Team	Pld	W	D	L	GF	GA	GD	Pts	Qualification
1	Belgium	3	3	0	0	4	1	+3	9	Advance to knockout stage
2	Algeria	3	1	1	1	6	5	+1	4	Advance to knockout stage
3	Russia	3	0	2	1	2	3	−1	2	
4	South Korea	3	0	1	2	3	6	−3	1	

Source: FIFA

17 June 2014
Belgium	2–1	Algeria	Estádio Mineirão, Belo Horizonte
Russia	1–1	South Korea	Arena Pantanal, Cuiabá
22 June 2014
Belgium	1–0	Russia	Estádio do Maracanã, Rio de Janeiro
South Korea	2–4	Algeria	Estádio Beira-Rio, Porto Alegre
26 June 2014
South Korea	0–1	Belgium	Arena de São Paulo, São Paulo
Algeria	1–1	Russia	Arena da Baixada, Curitiba

== Knockout stage ==
=== Bracket ===
Round of 16
28 June – Belo Horizonte
Brazil (p)	1 (3)
Chile	1 (2)
28 June – Rio de Janeiro
Colombia	2
Uruguay	0
30 June – Brasília
France	2
Nigeria	0
30 June – Porto Alegre
Germany (a.e.t.)	2
Algeria	1
29 June – Fortaleza
Netherlands	2
Mexico	1
29 June – Recife
Costa Rica (p)	1 (5)
Greece	1 (3)
1 July – São Paulo
Argentina (a.e.t.)	1
Switzerland	0
1 July – Salvador
Belgium (a.e.t.)	2
United States	1

Quarter-finals
4 July – Fortaleza
Brazil	2
Colombia	1
4 July – Rio de Janeiro
France	0
Germany	1
5 July – Salvador
Netherlands (p)	0 (4)
Costa Rica	0 (3)
5 July – Brasília
Argentina	1
Belgium	0

Semi-finals
8 July – Belo Horizonte
Brazil	1
Germany	7
9 July – São Paulo
Netherlands	0 (2)
Argentina (p)	0 (4)

Final
13 July – Rio de Janeiro
Germany (a.e.t.)	1
Argentina	0
Match for third place
12 July – Brasília
Brazil	0
Netherlands	3

Results decided after extra time are indicated by (a.e.t.), and results decided via a penalty shoot-out are indicated by (p).

=== Round of 16 ===
All the group winners advanced into the quarter-finals. They included four teams from UEFA, three from CONMEBOL, and one from CONCACAF. Of the eight matches, five required extra-time, and two of these required penalty shoot-outs; this was the first time penalty shoot-outs occurred in more than one game in a round of 16. (Note: In 1938's round of 16, two games were also tied after extra-time, but those were replayed instead.) The goal average per game in the round of 16 was 2.25, a drop of 0.58 goals per game from the group stage. The eight teams to win in the round of 16 included four former champions (Brazil, Germany, Argentina and France), a three-time runner-up (Netherlands), and two first-time quarter-finalists (Colombia and Costa Rica). Belgium reached the quarter-finals for the first time since 1986.

All times listed below are at local time (UTC−3)

28 June 2014
13:00 BRT (UTC−3)

Brazil	1–1 (a.e.t.)	Chile
David Luiz 18'		Sánchez 32'
Penalties
David Luiz (penalty scored); Willian (penalty missed); Marcelo (penalty scored); Hulk (penalty missed); Neymar (penalty scored)	3–2	(penalty missed) Pinilla; (penalty missed) Sánchez; (penalty scored) Aránguiz; (penalty scored) Díaz; (penalty missed) Jara

Estádio Mineirão, Belo Horizonte
Attendance: 57,714
Referee: Howard Webb (England)

28 June 2014
17:00 BRT (UTC−3)

Colombia	2–0	Uruguay
Rodríguez 28', 50'

Estádio do Maracanã, Rio de Janeiro
Attendance: 73,804
Referee: Björn Kuipers (Netherlands)

29 June 2014
13:00 BRT (UTC−3)

Netherlands	2–1	Mexico
Sneijder 88'; Huntelaar 90+4' (pen.)		Dos Santos 48'

Estádio Castelão, Fortaleza
Attendance: 58,817
Referee: Pedro Proença (Portugal)

29 June 2014
17:00 BRT (UTC−3)

Costa Rica	1–1 (a.e.t.)	Greece
Ruiz 52'		Papastathopoulos 90+1'
Penalties
Borges (penalty scored); Ruiz (penalty scored); González (penalty scored); Campbell (penalty scored); Umaña (penalty scored)	5–3	(penalty scored) Mitroglou; (penalty scored) Christodoulopoulos; (penalty scored) Holebas; (penalty missed) Gekas

Itaipava Arena Pernambuco, Recife
Attendance: 41,242
Referee: Ben Williams (Australia)

30 June 2014
13:00 BRT (UTC−3)

France	2–0	Nigeria
Pogba 79'; Yobo 90+2' (o.g.)

Estádio Nacional Mané Garrincha, Brasília
Attendance: 67,882
Referee: Mark Geiger (United States)

30 June 2014
17:00 BRT (UTC−3)

Germany	2–1 (a.e.t.)	Algeria
Schürrle 92'; Özil 119'		Djabou 120+1'

Estádio Beira-Rio, Porto Alegre
Attendance: 43,063
Referee: Sandro Ricci (Brazil)

1 July 2014
13:00 BRT (UTC−3)

Argentina	1–0 (a.e.t.)	Switzerland
Di María 118'

Arena Corinthians, São Paulo
Attendance: 63,255
Referee: Jonas Eriksson (Sweden)

1 July 2014
17:00 BRT (UTC−3)

Belgium	2–1 (a.e.t.)	United States
De Bruyne 93'; Lukaku 105'		Green 107'

Itaipava Arena Fonte Nova, Salvador
Attendance: 51,227
Referee: Djamel Haimoudi (Algeria)

=== Quarter-finals ===
With a 1–0 victory over France, Germany set a World Cup record with four consecutive semi-final appearances. Brazil beat Colombia 2–1, but Brazil's Neymar was injured and missed the rest of the competition. Argentina reached the final four for the first time since 1990 after a 1–0 win over Belgium. The Netherlands reached the semi-finals for the second consecutive tournament, after overcoming Costa Rica in a penalty shoot-out following a 0–0 draw at the end of extra time, with goalkeeper Tim Krul having been substituted on for the shoot-out and saving two penalties.

4 July 2014
13:00 BRT (UTC−3)

France	0–1	Germany
		Hummels 13'

Estádio do Maracanã, Rio de Janeiro
Attendance: 74,240
Referee: Néstor Pitana (Argentina)

4 July 2014
17:00 BRT (UTC−3)

Brazil	2–1	Colombia
Thiago Silva 7'; David Luiz 69'		Rodríguez 80' (pen.)

Estádio Castelão, Fortaleza
Attendance: 60,342
Referee: Carlos Velasco Carballo (Spain)

5 July 2014
13:00 BRT (UTC−3)

Argentina	1–0	Belgium
Higuaín 8'

Estádio Nacional Mané Garrincha, Brasília
Attendance: 68,551
Referee: Nicola Rizzoli (Italy)

5 July 2014
17:00 BRT (UTC−3)

Netherlands	0–0 (a.e.t.)	Costa Rica
Penalties
Van Persie (penalty scored); Robben (penalty scored); Sneijder (penalty scored); Kuyt (penalty scored)	4–3	(penalty scored) Borges; (penalty missed) Ruiz; (penalty scored) González; (penalty scored) Bolaños; (penalty missed) Umaña

Itaipava Arena Fonte Nova, Salvador
Attendance: 51,179
Referee: Ravshan Irmatov (Uzbekistan)

=== Semi-finals ===
Germany qualified for the final for the eighth time with a historic 7–1 win over Brazil – the biggest defeat in Brazilian football since 1920. Miroslav Klose's goal in this match was his 16th throughout all World Cups, breaking the record he had previously shared with Ronaldo. Klose set another record by becoming the first player to appear in four World Cup semi-finals. Argentina reached their first final since 1990, and their fifth overall, after overcoming the Netherlands in a penalty shoot-out following a 0–0 draw at the end of extra time.

8 July 2014
17:00 BRT (UTC−3)

Brazil	1–7	Germany
Oscar 89'		Müller 11'; Klose 23'; Kroos 24', 26'; Khedira 29'; Schürrle 69', 79'

Estádio Mineirão, Belo Horizonte
Attendance: 58,141
Referee: Marco Antonio Rodríguez (Mexico)

9 July 2014
17:00 BRT (UTC−3)

Netherlands	0–0 (a.e.t.)	Argentina
Penalties
Vlaar (penalty missed); Robben (penalty scored); Sneijder (penalty missed); Kuyt (penalty scored)	2–4	(penalty scored) Messi; (penalty scored) Garay; (penalty scored) Agüero; (penalty scored) Rodríguez

Arena Corinthians, São Paulo
Attendance: 63,267
Referee: Cüneyt Çakır (Turkey)

=== Match for third place ===
The Netherlands defeated Brazil 3–0 to secure third place, the first for the Dutch team in their history. Overall, Brazil conceded 14 goals in the tournament, five more than any other team; this was the most by a team at any single World Cup since 1986, and the most by a host nation in history, although their fourth-place finish still represented Brazil's best result in a World Cup since their last win in 2002.

12 July 2014
17:00 BRT (UTC−3)

Brazil	0–3	Netherlands
		Van Persie 3' (pen.); Blind 17'; Wijnaldum 90+1'

Estádio Nacional Mané Garrincha, Brasília
Attendance: 68,034
Referee: Djamel Haimoudi (Algeria)

=== Final ===
The final featured Germany against Argentina for a record third time after 1986 and 1990.

13 July 2014
16:00 BRT (UTC−3)

Germany	1–0 (a.e.t.)	Argentina
Götze 113'

Maracanã Stadium, Rio de Janeiro
Attendance: 74,738
Referee: Nicola Rizzoli (Italy)

This marked the first time that teams from the same continent had won three consecutive World Cups (following Italy in 2006 and Spain in 2010). It was also the first time that a European nation had won the World Cup in the Americas. On aggregate, Europe then had eleven victories to South America's nine.

== Statistics ==
=== Goalscorers ===
In total, 171 goals were scored by a record 121 players, with five credited as own goals. Goals scored from penalty shoot-outs are not counted. James Rodríguez was awarded the Golden Boot for scoring six goals, the first time that a Colombian player received the award.

6 goals

- (Colombia) James Rodríguez

5 goals

- (Germany) Thomas Müller

4 goals

- (Argentina) Lionel Messi
- (Brazil) Neymar
- (Netherlands) Robin van Persie

3 goals

- (Ecuador) Enner Valencia
- (France) Karim Benzema
- (Germany) André Schürrle
- (Netherlands) Arjen Robben
- (Switzerland) Xherdan Shaqiri

2 goals

- (Algeria) Abdelmoumene Djabou
- (Algeria) Islam Slimani
- (Australia) Tim Cahill
- (Brazil) David Luiz
- (Brazil) Oscar
- (Chile) Alexis Sánchez
- (Colombia) Jackson Martínez
- (Costa Rica) Bryan Ruiz
- (Croatia) Mario Mandžukić
- (Croatia) Ivan Perišić
- (Germany) Mario Götze
- (Germany) Mats Hummels
- (Germany) Miroslav Klose
- (Germany) Toni Kroos
- (Ghana) André Ayew
- (Ghana) Asamoah Gyan
- (Ivory Coast) Wilfried Bony
- (Ivory Coast) Gervinho
- (Netherlands) Memphis Depay
- (Nigeria) Ahmed Musa
- (United States) Clint Dempsey
- (Uruguay) Luis Suárez

1 goal

- (Algeria) Yacine Brahimi
- (Algeria) Sofiane Feghouli
- (Algeria) Rafik Halliche
- (Argentina) Ángel Di María
- (Argentina) Gonzalo Higuaín
- (Argentina) Marcos Rojo
- (Australia) Mile Jedinak
- (Belgium) Kevin De Bruyne
- (Belgium) Marouane Fellaini
- (Belgium) Romelu Lukaku
- (Belgium) Dries Mertens
- (Belgium) Divock Origi
- (Belgium) Jan Vertonghen
- (Bosnia and Herzegovina) Edin Džeko
- (Bosnia and Herzegovina) Vedad Ibišević
- (Bosnia and Herzegovina) Miralem Pjanić
- (Bosnia and Herzegovina) Avdija Vršajević
- (Brazil) Fernandinho
- (Brazil) Fred
- (Brazil) Thiago Silva
- (Cameroon) Joël Matip
- (Chile) Charles Aránguiz
- (Chile) Jean Beausejour
- (Chile) Jorge Valdivia
- (Chile) Eduardo Vargas
- (Colombia) Pablo Armero
- (Colombia) Juan Cuadrado
- (Colombia) Teófilo Gutiérrez
- (Colombia) Juan Quintero
- (Costa Rica) Joel Campbell
- (Costa Rica) Óscar Duarte
- (Costa Rica) Marco Ureña
- (Croatia) Ivica Olić
- (England) Wayne Rooney
- (England) Daniel Sturridge
- (France) Olivier Giroud
- (France) Blaise Matuidi
- (France) Paul Pogba
- (France) Moussa Sissoko
- (France) Mathieu Valbuena
- (Germany) Sami Khedira
- (Germany) Mesut Özil
- (Greece) Sokratis Papastathopoulos
- (Greece) Georgios Samaras
- (Greece) Andreas Samaris
- (Honduras) Carlo Costly
- (Iran) Reza Ghoochannejhad
- (Italy) Mario Balotelli
- (Italy) Claudio Marchisio
- (Japan) Keisuke Honda
- (Japan) Shinji Okazaki
- (Mexico) Giovani dos Santos
- (Mexico) Andrés Guardado
- (Mexico) Javier Hernández
- (Mexico) Rafael Márquez
- (Mexico) Oribe Peralta
- (Netherlands) Daley Blind
- (Netherlands) Stefan de Vrij
- (Netherlands) Leroy Fer
- (Netherlands) Klaas-Jan Huntelaar
- (Netherlands) Wesley Sneijder
- (Netherlands) Georginio Wijnaldum
- (Nigeria) Peter Odemwingie
- (Portugal) Cristiano Ronaldo
- (Portugal) Nani
- (Portugal) Silvestre Varela
- (Russia) Aleksandr Kerzhakov
- (Russia) Aleksandr Kokorin
- (South Korea) Koo Ja-cheol
- (South Korea) Lee Keun-ho
- (South Korea) Son Heung-min
- (Spain) Xabi Alonso
- (Spain) Juan Mata
- (Spain) Fernando Torres
- (Spain) David Villa
- (Switzerland) Blerim Džemaili
- (Switzerland) Admir Mehmedi
- (Switzerland) Haris Seferovic
- (Switzerland) Granit Xhaka
- (United States) John Brooks
- (United States) Julian Green
- (United States) Jermaine Jones
- (Uruguay) Edinson Cavani
- (Uruguay) Diego Godín

Own goals

- (Bosnia and Herzegovina) Sead Kolašinac (against Argentina)
- (Brazil) Marcelo (against Croatia)
- (Ghana) John Boye (against Portugal)
- (Honduras) Noel Valladares (against France)
- (Nigeria) Joseph Yobo (against France)

Source: FIFA

=== Discipline ===
The most notable disciplinary case was that of Uruguayan striker Luis Suárez, who was suspended for nine international matches and banned from taking part in any football-related activity (including entering any stadium) for four months, following a biting incident on Italian defender Giorgio Chiellini. He was also fined CHF100,000. After an appeal to the Court of Arbitration for Sport, Suárez was later allowed to participate in training and friendly matches with his new club Barcelona.

A player was automatically suspended for the next match for the following offences:

- Receiving a red card (red card suspensions could be extended for serious offences)
- Receiving two yellow cards in two matches; yellow cards expired after the completion of the quarter-finals (yellow card suspensions were not carried forward to any other future international matches)

The following suspensions were served during the tournament:

Player	Offence(s)	Suspension(s)
(Uruguay) Maxi Pereira	(red card) in Group D vs Costa Rica (matchday 1; 14 June)	Group D vs England (matchday 2; 19 June)
(Honduras) Wilson Palacios	(yellow card) (yellow-red card) in Group E vs France (matchday 1; 15 June)	Group E vs Ecuador (matchday 2; 20 June)
(Portugal) Pepe	(red card) in Group G vs Germany (matchday 1; 16 June)	Group G vs United States (matchday 2; 22 June)
(Australia) Tim Cahill	(yellow card) in Group B vs Chile (matchday 1; 13 June); (yellow card) in Group B vs Netherlands (matchday 2; 18 June)	Group B vs Spain (matchday 3; 23 June)
(Netherlands) Robin van Persie	(yellow card) in Group B vs Spain (matchday 1; 13 June); (yellow card) in Group B vs Australia (matchday 2; 18 June)	Group B vs Chile (matchday 3; 23 June)
(Cameroon) Alex Song	(red card) in Group A vs Croatia (matchday 2; 18 June)	Group A vs Brazil (matchday 3; 23 June)
(Ivory Coast) Didier Zokora	(yellow card) in Group C vs Japan (matchday 1; 14 June); (yellow card) in Group C vs Colombia (matchday 2; 19 June)	Group C vs Greece (matchday 3; 24 June)
(Greece) Kostas Katsouranis	(yellow card) (yellow-red card) in Group C vs Japan (matchday 2; 19 June)	Group C vs Ivory Coast (matchday 3; 24 June)
(France) Yohan Cabaye	(yellow card) in Group E vs Honduras (matchday 1; 15 June); (yellow card) in Group E vs Switzerland (matchday 2; 20 June)	Group E vs Ecuador (matchday 3; 25 June)
(Ghana) Sulley Muntari	(yellow card) in Group G vs United States (matchday 1; 16 June); (yellow card) in Group G vs Germany (matchday 2; 21 June)	Group G vs Portugal (matchday 3; 26 June)
(Mexico) José Juan Vázquez	(yellow card) in Group A vs Brazil (matchday 2; 17 June); (yellow card) in Group A vs Croatia (matchday 3; 23 June)	Round of 16 vs Netherlands (29 June)
(Croatia) Ante Rebić	(red card) in Group A vs Mexico (matchday 3; 23 June)	Suspension served outside tournament
(Italy) Claudio Marchisio	(red card) in Group D vs Uruguay (matchday 3; 24 June)	Suspension served outside tournament
(Uruguay) Luis Suárez	Bite on Giorgio Chiellini in Group D vs Italy (matchday 3; 24 June)	Round of 16 vs Colombia (28 June)
(Ecuador) Antonio Valencia	(red card) in Group E vs France (matchday 3; 25 June)	Suspension served outside tournament
(Belgium) Steven Defour	(red card) in Group H vs South Korea (matchday 3; 26 June)	Round of 16 vs United States (1 July)
(Brazil) Luiz Gustavo	(yellow card) in Group A vs Croatia (matchday 1; 12 June); (yellow card) in Round of 16 vs Chile (28 June)	Quarter-finals vs Colombia (4 July)
(Costa Rica) Óscar Duarte	(yellow card) (yellow-red card) in Round of 16 vs Greece (29 June)	Quarter-finals vs Netherlands (5 July)
(Argentina) Marcos Rojo	(yellow card) in Group F vs Bosnia and Herzegovina (matchday 1; 15 June); (yellow card) in Round of 16 vs Switzerland (1 July)	Quarter-finals vs Belgium (5 July)
(Brazil) Thiago Silva	(yellow card) in Group A vs Mexico (matchday 2; 17 June); (yellow card) in Quarter-finals vs Colombia (4 July)	Semi-finals vs Germany (8 July)

=== Awards ===
The following awards were given at the conclusion of the tournament:

Award	Winner	Other nominees
Golden Ball	(gold) (Argentina) Lionel Messi; (silver) (Germany) Thomas Müller; (bronze) (Netherlands) Arjen Robben	(Argentina) Ángel Di María (Colombia) James Rodríguez (Argentina) Javier Mascherano (Germany) Mats Hummels (Brazil) Neymar (Germany) Philipp Lahm (Germany) Toni Kroos
Golden Boot	(gold) (Colombia) James Rodríguez (6 goals, 2 assists); (silver) (Germany) Thomas Müller (5 goals, 3 assists); (bronze) (Brazil) Neymar (4 goals, 1 assist)	
Golden Glove	(Germany) Manuel Neuer	(Costa Rica) Keylor Navas (Argentina) Sergio Romero
Young Player Award	(France) Paul Pogba	(Netherlands) Memphis Depay (France) Raphaël Varane
FIFA Fair Play Trophy	Colombia	

Technical Study Group

The members of the Technical Study Group, the committee that decided which players won the awards, were led by FIFA's head of the Technical Division Jean-Paul Brigger and featured:

- (France) Gérard Houllier
- (Mexico) Raul Arias
- (Argentina) Gabriel Calderón
- (New Zealand) Ricki Herbert
- (Sudan) Abdel Moneim Hussein
- (Hong Kong) Kwok Ka Ming
- (Romania) Ioan Lupescu
- (Spain) Ginés Meléndez
- (Japan) Tsuneyasu Miyamoto
- (Nigeria) Sunday Oliseh
- (Finland) Mixu Paatelainen
- (El Salvador) Jaime Rodríguez
- (Jamaica) Theodore Whitmore

There were changes to the voting procedure for awards for the 2014 edition: while in 2010 accredited media were allowed to vote for the Golden Ball award, in 2014 only the Technical Study Group could select the outcome.

=== All-Star Team ===
As was the case during the 2010 edition, FIFA released an All-Star Team based on the Castrol performance index in its official website.

Goalkeeper	Defenders	Midfielders	Forwards
(Germany) Manuel Neuer	(Argentina) Marcos Rojo (Germany) Mats Hummels (Brazil) Thiago Silva (Netherlands) Stefan de Vrij	(Brazil) Oscar (Germany) Toni Kroos (Germany) Philipp Lahm (Colombia) James Rodríguez	(Netherlands) Arjen Robben (Germany) Thomas Müller

=== Dream Team ===
FIFA also invited users of FIFA.com to elect their Dream Team.

Goalkeeper	Defenders	Midfielders	Forwards	Manager
(Germany) Manuel Neuer	(Brazil) Marcelo (Germany) Mats Hummels (Brazil) Thiago Silva (Brazil) David Luiz	(Argentina) Ángel Di María (Germany) Toni Kroos (Colombia) James Rodríguez	(Brazil) Neymar (Argentina) Lionel Messi (Germany) Thomas Müller	(Germany) Joachim Löw

=== Prize money ===
The total prize money on offer for the tournament was confirmed by FIFA as US$576 million (including payments of $70 million to domestic clubs and $100 million as player insurances), a 37 percent increase from the amount allocated in the 2010 tournament. Before the tournament, each of the 32 entrants received $1.5 million for preparation costs. At the tournament, the prize money was distributed as follows:

- $8 million – To each team eliminated at the group stage (16 teams)
- $9 million – To each team eliminated in the round of 16 (8 teams)
- $14 million – To each team eliminated in the quarter-finals (4 teams)
- $20 million – Fourth placed team
- $22 million – Third placed team
- $25 million – Runner-up
- $35 million – Winner

=== Tournament ranking ===
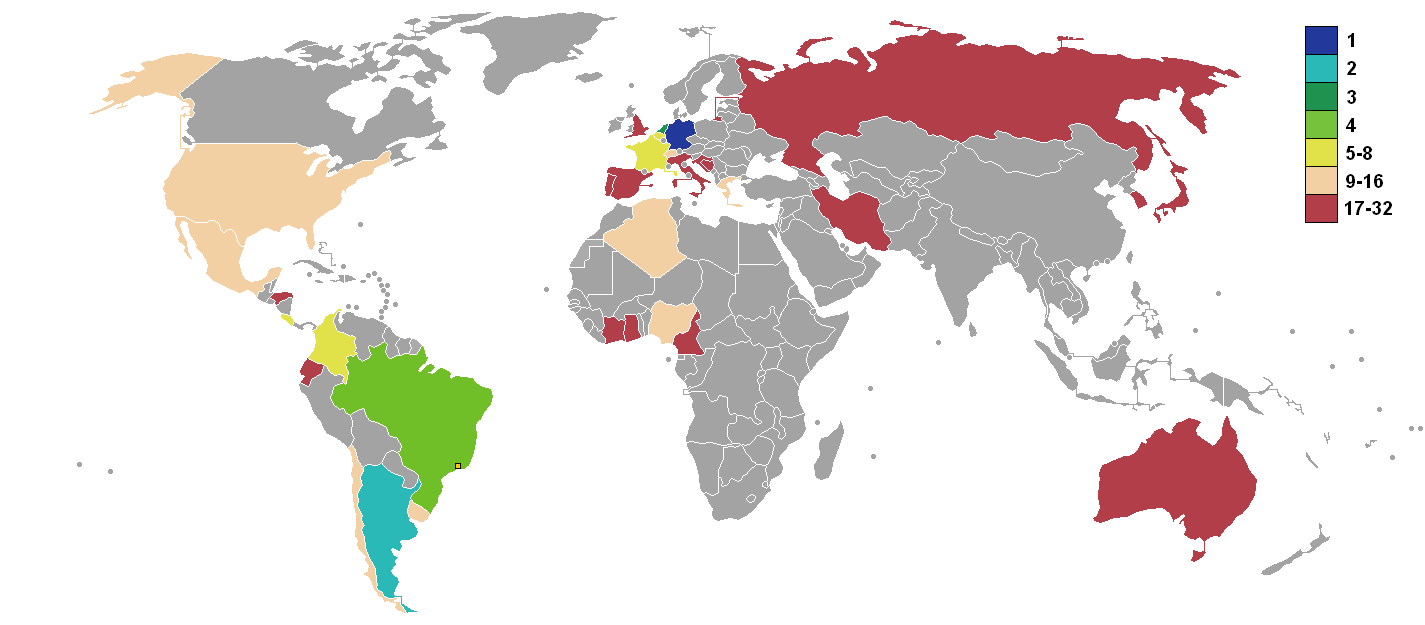
Result of countries participating in the 2014 FIFA World Cup Champion Runner-up Third place Fourth place Quarter-finals Round of 16 Group stage

Per statistical convention in football, matches decided in extra time are counted as wins and losses, while matches decided by penalty shoot-outs are counted as draws.

Pos	Grp	Team	Pld	W	D	L	GF	GA	GD	Pts	Final result
1	G	Germany	7	6	1	0	18	4	+14	19	Champions
2	F	Argentina	7	5	1	1	8	4	+4	16	Runners-up
3	B	Netherlands	7	5	2	0	15	4	+11	17	Third place
4	A	Brazil (H)	7	3	2	2	11	14	−3	11	Fourth place
5	C	Colombia	5	4	0	1	12	4	+8	12	Eliminated in quarter-finals
6	H	Belgium	5	4	0	1	6	3	+3	12	Eliminated in quarter-finals
7	E	France	5	3	1	1	10	3	+7	10	Eliminated in quarter-finals
8	D	Costa Rica	5	2	3	0	5	2	+3	9	Eliminated in quarter-finals
9	B	Chile	4	2	1	1	6	4	+2	7	Eliminated in round of 16
10	A	Mexico	4	2	1	1	5	3	+2	7	Eliminated in round of 16
11	E	Switzerland	4	2	0	2	7	7	0	6	Eliminated in round of 16
12	D	Uruguay	4	2	0	2	4	6	−2	6	Eliminated in round of 16
13	C	Greece	4	1	2	1	3	5	−2	5	Eliminated in round of 16
14	H	Algeria	4	1	1	2	7	7	0	4	Eliminated in round of 16
15	G	United States	4	1	1	2	5	6	−1	4	Eliminated in round of 16
16	F	Nigeria	4	1	1	2	3	5	−2	4	Eliminated in round of 16
17	E	Ecuador	3	1	1	1	3	3	0	4	Eliminated in group stage
18	G	Portugal	3	1	1	1	4	7	−3	4	Eliminated in group stage
19	A	Croatia	3	1	0	2	6	6	0	3	Eliminated in group stage
20	F	Bosnia and Herzegovina	3	1	0	2	4	4	0	3	Eliminated in group stage
21	C	Ivory Coast	3	1	0	2	4	5	−1	3	Eliminated in group stage
22	D	Italy	3	1	0	2	2	3	−1	3	Eliminated in group stage
23	B	Spain	3	1	0	2	4	7	−3	3	Eliminated in group stage
24	H	Russia	3	0	2	1	2	3	−1	2	Eliminated in group stage
25	G	Ghana	3	0	1	2	4	6	−2	1	Eliminated in group stage
26	D	England	3	0	1	2	2	4	−2	1	Eliminated in group stage
27	H	South Korea	3	0	1	2	3	6	−3	1	Eliminated in group stage
28	F	Iran	3	0	1	2	1	4	−3	1	Eliminated in group stage
29	C	Japan	3	0	1	2	2	6	−4	1	Eliminated in group stage
30	B	Australia	3	0	0	3	3	9	−6	0	Eliminated in group stage
31	E	Honduras	3	0	0	3	1	8	−7	0	Eliminated in group stage
32	A	Cameroon	3	0	0	3	1	9	−8	0	Eliminated in group stage

Source: FIFA
(H) Hosts

== Preparations and costs ==
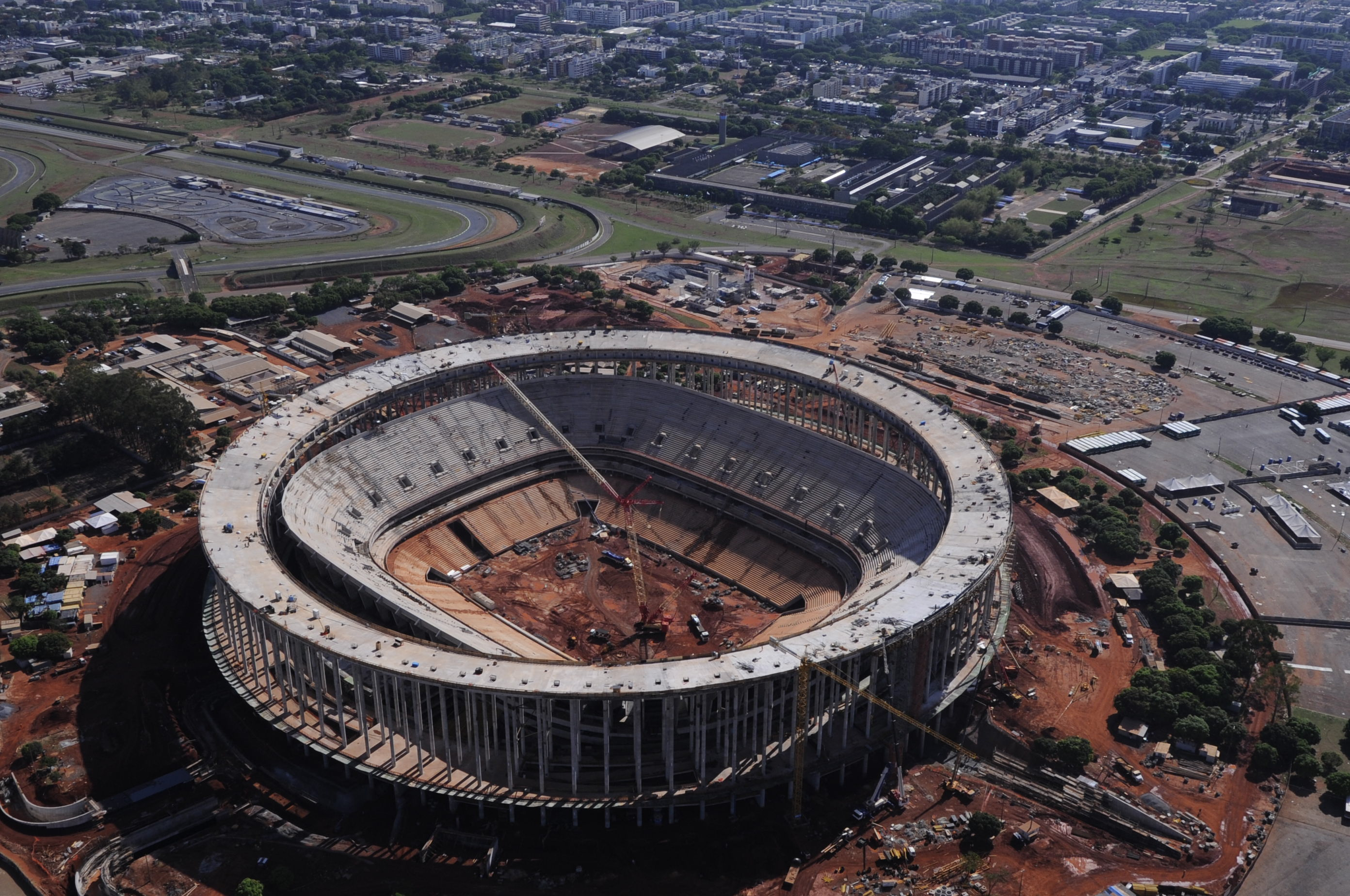
The Estádio Nacional in Brasília during its rebuild. The project was completed at a cost of US$900 million, against an original budget of US$300 million, making the stadium the second-most expensive football stadium in the world after England's Wembley Stadium.

Costs of the tournament totalled $11.6 billion, making it the most expensive World Cup until it was surpassed by 2018 FIFA World Cup which cost an estimated $14.2 billion. FIFA was expected to spend US$2 billion on staging the finals, with its greatest single expense being the US$576 million prize money pot.

Although organisers originally estimated costs of US$1.1 billion, a reported US$3.6 billion was ultimately spent on stadium works. Five of the chosen host cities had brand new venues built specifically for the World Cup, while the Estádio Nacional Mané Garrincha in the capital Brasília was demolished and rebuilt, with the remaining six being extensively renovated.

An additional R$3 billion (US$1.3 billion, €960 million, £780 million at June 2014 rates) was earmarked by the Brazilian government for investment in infrastructure works and projects for use during the 2014 World Cup and beyond. However, the failed completion of many of the proposed works provoked discontent among some Brazilians.

The Brazilian government pledged US$900 million to be invested into security forces and that the tournament would be "one of the most protected sports events in history."

== Marketing ==
The marketing of the 2014 FIFA World Cup included sale of tickets, support from sponsors and promotion through events that utilise the symbols and songs of the tournament. Popular merchandise included items featuring the official mascot as well as an official video game that has been developed by EA Sports. As a partner of the German Football Association, part of German major airline Lufthansa's fleet was branded "Fanhansa" for the time being. Branded planes flew the Germany national team, media representatives and football fans to Brazil.

The Sony Xperia Z2 was dubbed the "official smartphone of the 2014 FIFA World Cup".

=== Sponsorship ===
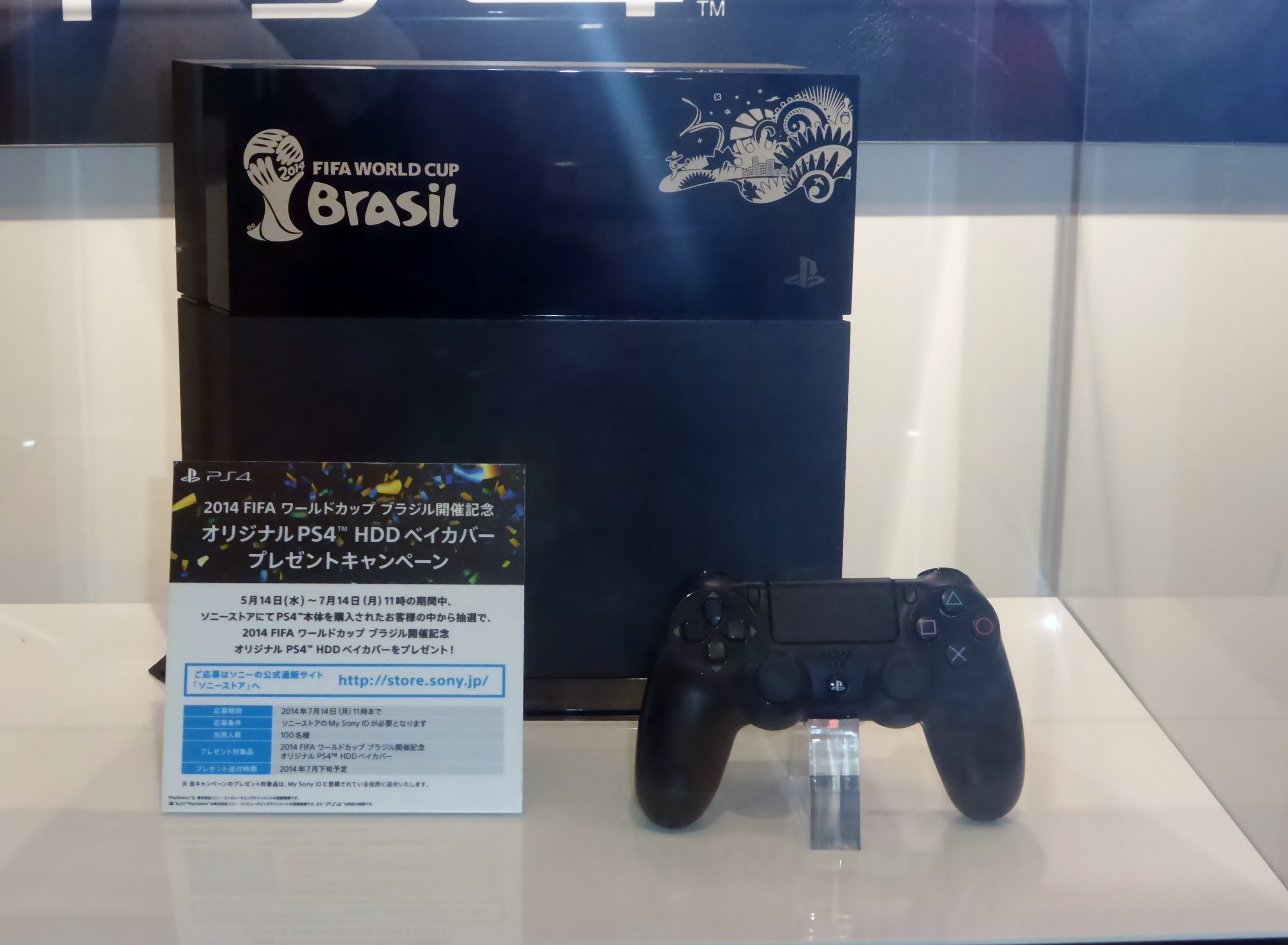
Sony was one of the sponsors of FIFA World Cup 2014.

The sponsors of the 2014 World Cup are divided into three categories: FIFA Partners, FIFA World Cup Sponsors and National Supporters.

FIFA partners	FIFA World Cup sponsors	National supporters
Adidas; Coca-Cola; Emirates; Hyundai–Kia; Sony; Visa	Anheuser-Busch InBev; Castrol; Continental; McDonald's; Johnson & Johnson; Marfrig; Yingli Solar; Oi	Apex-Brasil; Garoto; Centauro; Banco Itaú; Liberty Seguros; Wiseup

== Symbols ==
=== Mascot ===
The official mascot of this World Cup was "Fuleco"

=== Match ball ===
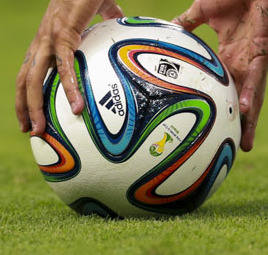
Adidas Brazuca

The official match ball was "Brazuca", manufactured by Adidas.

=== Music ===
The official song of the tournament was "We Are One (Ole Ola)" with vocals from Pitbull, Jennifer Lopez and Claudia Leitte.

The official mascot song was "Tatu Bom de Bola".

The official anthem was "Dar um Jeito (We Will Find a Way)".

== Media ==
For a fourth consecutive FIFA World Cup Finals, the coverage was provided by HBS (Host Broadcast Services), a subsidiary of Infront Sports & Media. Sony was selected as the official equipment provider and built 12 bespoke high definition production 40-foot-long containers, one for each tournament venue, to house the extensive amount of equipment required. Each match utilised 37 standard camera plans, including Aerial and Cablecam, two Ultramotion cameras and dedicated cameras for interviews. The official tournament film, as well as three matches, (Note: Those matches scheduled to be filmed in ultra high definition were one match from the round of 16 (on 28 June), one quarter-final (on 4 July) and the final) will be filmed with ultra high definition technology (4K resolution), following a successful trial at the 2013 FIFA Confederations Cup.

The broadcasting rights – covering television, radio, internet and mobile coverage – for the tournament were sold to media companies in each individual territory either directly by FIFA, or through licensed companies or organisations such as the European Broadcasting Union, Organización de Televisión Iberoamericana, International Media Content, Dentsu and RS International Broadcasting & Sports Management. The sale of these rights accounted for an estimated 60% of FIFA's income from staging a World Cup. The International Broadcast Centre was situated at the Riocentro in the Barra da Tijuca neighbourhood of Rio de Janeiro.

Worldwide, several games qualified as the most-watched sporting events in their country in 2014, including 42.9 million people in Brazil for the opening game between Brazil and Croatia, the 34.1 million in Japan who saw their team play Ivory Coast, and 34.7 million in Germany who saw their national team win the World Cup against Argentina, while the 24.7 million viewers during the game between the US and Portugal is joint with the 2010 final as the most-watched football game in the United States. According to FIFA, over 1 billion people tuned in worldwide to watch the final between Germany and Argentina.

== Controversies ==
The 2014 FIFA World Cup generated various controversies, including demonstrations, some of which took place even before the tournament started. Furthermore, there were various issues with safety, including the death of eight workers and a fire during construction, breaches into stadiums, an unstable makeshift staircase at the Maracanã Stadium, a monorail collapse, and the collapse of an unfinished overpass in Belo Horizonte. The houses of thousands of families living in Rio de Janeiro’s slums were cleared for redevelopments for the World Cup in spite of protests and resistance. Favela do Metrô, near the Maracanã Stadium, was completely destroyed as a result, having previously housed 700 families in 2010.

=== Protests ===
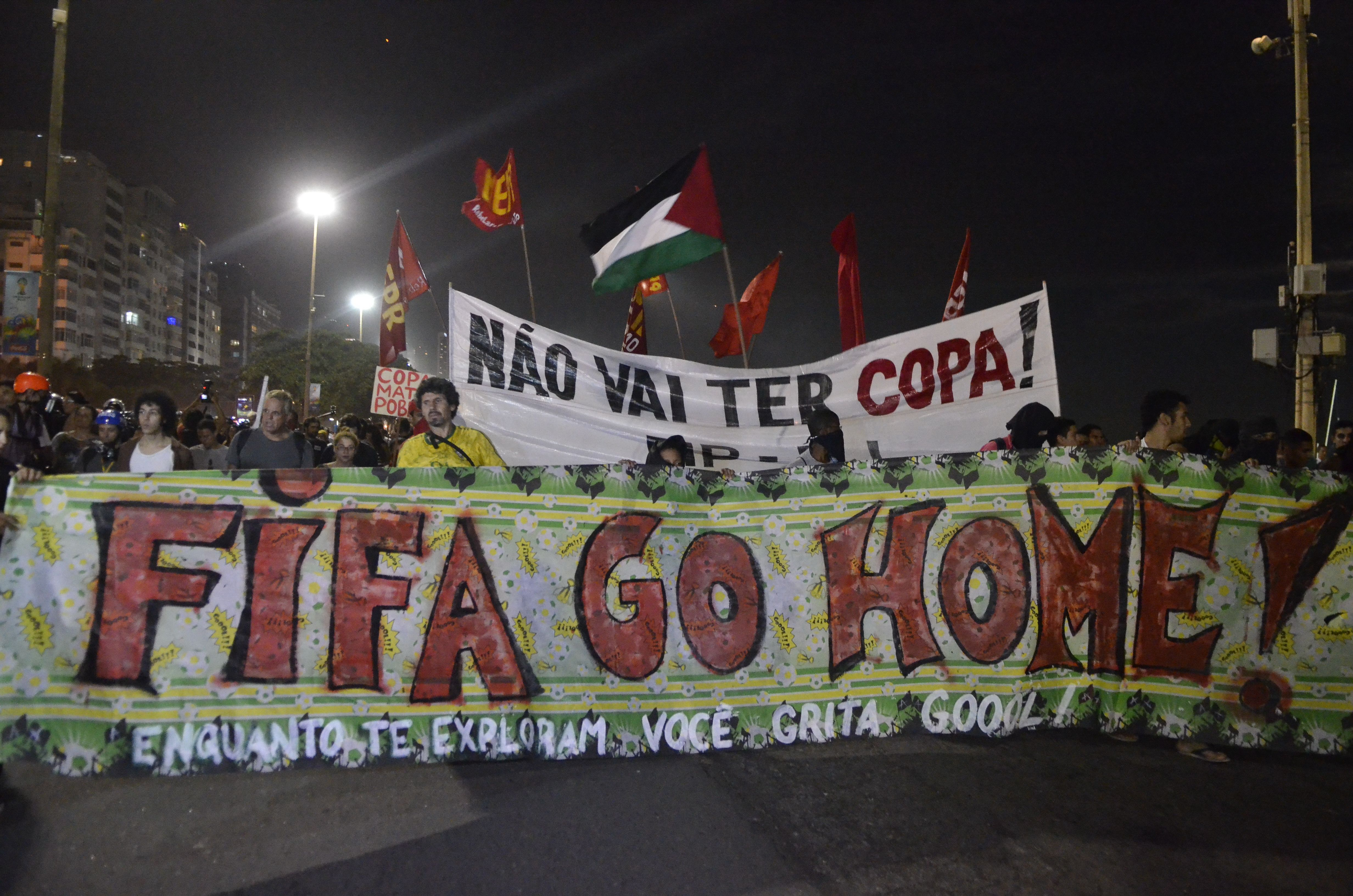
Anti-World Cup demonstration on the opening day; "Não vai ter Copa" ("There will be no [World] Cup") was a common slogan from protesters

Prior to the opening ceremony of the 2013 FIFA Confederations Cup staged in Brazil, demonstrations took place outside the venue, organised by people unhappy with the amount of public money spent to enable the hosting of the FIFA World Cup. Both the Brazilian president Dilma Rousseff and FIFA president Sepp Blatter were heavily booed as they were announced to give their speeches at the 2013 tournament's opening, which resulted in FIFA announcing that the 2014 FIFA World Cup opening ceremony would not feature any speeches. Further protests took place during the Confederations Cup as well as prior to and during the World Cup.

=== Breaches into stadiums ===
At the Group B match between Spain and Chile, around 100 Chilean supporters who had gathered outside Maracanã Stadium forced their way into the stadium and caused damage to the media centre. Military police reported that 85 Chileans were detained during the events, while others reached the stands. Earlier, about 20 Argentinians made a similar breach during Argentina's Group F game against Bosnia and Herzegovina at the same stadium.

=== Bridge collapse ===
On 3 July 2014, an overpass under construction in Belo Horizonte as part of the World Cup infrastructure projects collapsed onto a busy carriageway below, leaving two people dead and 22 others injured.

=== Head injuries ===
During the tournament, FIFA received significant criticism for the way head injuries were handled during matches. Two incidents in particular attracted the most attention. First, in a group stage match, after Uruguayan defender Álvaro Pereira received a blow to the head, he lay unconscious. The Uruguayan doctor signalled for the player to be substituted, but he returned to the match. The incident drew criticism from the professional players' union FIFPro, and from Michel D'Hooghe, a member of the FIFA executive board and chairman of its medical committee.

Second, in the Final, German midfielder Christoph Kramer received a blow to the head from a collision in the 14th minute, but returned to the match before collapsing in the 31st minute. During that time, Kramer was disoriented and confused, and asked the referee Nicola Rizzoli whether the match he was playing was in the World Cup Final.

== See also ==
- FIFA World Cup
- List of FIFA World Cup hosts
- 2015 FIFA Women's World Cup
