= Abdel Moneim Hussein =

Egyptian footballer (born 1952)

Technical Director for CAF
- Incumbent
- Assumed office 2003

Personal details
- Born: Abdel Moneim Mustafa Hussein; 1952 (age 73–74) Khartoum, North Sudan
- Occupation: Footballer (retired); Manager (retired); Football administrator
Association football career
- Positions: Forward; defensive midfielder
Youth career
- 1967–1970: Thuraya SC
Senior career*
Years	Team	Apps	(Gls)
1970–1972	Al Tahrir SC	-	(-)
1973–1983	Al Ahly SC	-	(-)
Total		-	(-)
Managerial career
- 1992–1995: Al Ahly SC
- * Club domestic league appearances and goals

Abdel Moneim Mustafa Hussein (عبدالمنعم مصطفى حسين) (born 1952) is a former Sudanese football player and manager, and the technical director for Confederation of African Football (CAF) since 2003. He played from 1973 to 1983 in Al Ahly SC and was nicknamed Qarn Shatta. As a player:

1970-1972: Al Tahrir (Sudan)

1973-1983: Al Ahly (Egypt)

As a coach:

1983-2003: Al Ahly (Egypt) - all age groups while first team was from 92 to 95.

A respected and hard-working player, Abdel Moneim Hussein, known as "Shatta", has gone on to become one of key figures in the development and study of football in Africa. The Football Development Director for the Confederation of African Football, he first started coaching the game after retiring as a player from Egyptian giants Ah Ahly in 1984. He played during the seventies and early eighties as a defensive midfielder and won the Egyptian league championship and Egyptian Cup over 10 times, as well as the African Champions League. He was also selected as the best defensive midfielder in Egypt during the seventies.

He showed great promise working with the youth teams of the club from the U-10s up and assisted various first team coaches at the time. He led the senior team from 1993 to 1995, winning the Egyptian Champions League and Egyptian Cup, as well as the Arab Championship Cup.

Hussein has since become a student of the game, going through coaching courses in Egypt, England and Romania and getting elite licenses from CAF and FIFA. He worked as an assistant to FIFA Instructor Detmer Kramer in Egypt collaborating with the Egyptian FA in 1992-1994 before becoming a FIFA instructor himself.

Since 1993, Hussein has been the Technical Director for CAF, conducting courses for coaches and leading the licensing system for the confederation. He is in charge of the CAF Technical Study Group for the CAF Africa Cup of Nations and other competitions, and he has been at many tournaments for FIFA’s Technical Study Group. He is also responsible for the development of refereeing, futsal and women's football in Africa.

Born in Sudan but based in Egypt since 1973, he finished his university studies as an electronic engineer in 1979 from Cairo University. Hussein helped launch the licensing system for African coaches, and his career as an engineer helped him use multimedia materials and facilitate DVDs and audiovisual materials to all technical departments of all member associations.
