= Campo Bahia =

Sports and nature resort in Santo André, Brazil

Coordinates: 16°14′41″S 39°00′39″W

Campo Bahia is a sports and nature resort in the village of Santo André. It is located on the southern tip of the state of Bahia in the North-East region of Brazil, about eight kilometers north of Santa Cruz Cabrália, and 30 kilometers north of Porto Seguro, on the Atlantic coast of Brazil. famous for hosting the Germany national football team, who used it during their 2014 FIFA World Cup campaign. After the World Cup concluded, the resort was opened to the public.

== Description ==
The resort covers 15,000 square meters, and includes 14 two-storey houses, 65 residential units, a fitness centre, training pitch, a restaurant, a pool area and easy access to the beach. A football youth academy and an orphanage will be built on the site as well.

The facility reportedly cost around £25 million, and was built by a German real estate developer. Whilst many sources incorrectly state that the German Football Federation (DFB) built the facility themselves, the DFB themselves have repeatedly pointed that this is not the case: "Campo Bahia was not built by us, for us or in accordance with our requirements".

== 2014 FIFA World Cup base camp ==
Completion was originally scheduled for March 2014, and there were worries it would not be fully complete for the start of the World Cup. According to media reports, the resort was completed just days before the arrival of the national team. The first visitors were the Germany national football team, who used it as their training camp during 2014 FIFA World Cup. The location was chosen to minimise travel, as it is within two hours' flight of the team's group games, and is a short trip to the airport. It also allowed acclimatisation to the weather, as well as good security.

According to a Harvard Business School Study Jan 5, 2016 the team base camp "Campo Bahia" was a significant contribution to the victory of the 2014 FIFA World Cup.

In 2013, the DFB identified Campo Bahia, a resort site under development by private investors, led by a German businessman. Spanning 15,000 square meters along the beach, the site comprised 14 two-story villas and a total of 64 residential units, with each villa housing six players. Along with the 23-player squad, the resort would also house the team staff of 39. The site included an outdoor swimming pool, a spa, a lounge and dining area, a fitness center, smaller informal areas to gather, and an auditorium for team meetings. A new media center and football pitch with a goalkeeper training facility was built within walking distance.

Oliver Bierhoff saw the project as an ideal way of building team spirit. Given its stage of construction, as the first “renters” of the site, the DFB was able to provide input on some of the site's features. One observer explained, “The base was a very important point in the planning of the tournament for Germany. [. . .] The idea of living together [was] very good for team spirit. You have your own space but the players are always bumping into each other around the resort. It’s different to a hotel where you just have a room. [It was] the perfect place to rest and calm down. Getting the right home base was always a huge thing for Oliver Bierhoff.” He recalled his aim with the site:

I vividly remember the harsh criticism people voiced when we announced that we'd set up camp in the state of Bahia, near Porto Seguro. The main “accusation” was we would have a whole complex built from scratch, just for us, and we never really managed to squash these rumors. The truth is, we didn't just want to organize the umpteenth training camp. It had to be something special. And so it came that this very compact place somehow created a special atmosphere, with all of us running into each other several times a day, with groups of six players each sharing a house. And let's not forget the ferry! On the day we arrived we took an age-old ferry to cross an estuary. I could see in the players’ faces it was dawning on them there was something new happening. That ferry ride ended up having symbolic value—coming home to Santo Andre. When we returned home, everyone knew that our work had been done. Leaving it, we all knew that we had a tough day ahead of us.

Germany's National Team Office Manager Georg Behlau, explained:

The Campo Bahia complex had quiet zones and operative centers. The house in the middle was where players, coaches, and backroom staff met for meals, with tables and benches placed outdoors. In their respective villas, the players had to organize themselves and even do some of the chores, which obviously differed considerably from the typical five-star hotel service. Shouldering this kind of responsibility prevents you from getting into a rut, from succumbing to monotony. Also, over the last few years, we’ve extended the travel options for the players’ friends and family. Their partners, children, parents, and friends came to visit at Campo Bahia, and that created a great kind of family atmosphere. I think the players could use their time off in the best possible way.

While Löw and Bierhoff were initially worried by the resort's small size, the team's psychologist believed that forcing players to live together in close proximity would ultimately build a stronger team spirit. Upon this recommendation, players were assigned to four bungalows, and housemates were deliberately chosen to prevent the formation of cliques. For example, two players for the Bundesliga club Bayern Munich were grouped with a member of rival clubs Borussia Dortmund and Schalke 04. Additionally, room televisions were limited to Germany's two main public broadcasting channels, encouraging players to relax outdoors and engage in social activities. German players noted that the openness of the resort and its central complex allowed players to interact regularly, spend time with one another, and grow closer. One player said, “We are incredibly happy that we have had these facilities. We have developed a team spirit that has been very good for us. It’s been perfect.”58 Bierhoff added, “Working. Relaxing. Spending time together. And leaving people enough breathing space. Campo Bahia was perfect and met many of the requirements of a modern working environment.”
