= Pro Evolution Soccer 2018 =

2017 video game

- PlayStation 4 cover of the "Premium Edition" featuring FC Barcelona player Luis Suárez
- Developer: PES Productions
- Publishers: Konami; NetEase (mobile, China only)
- Director: Yoshikatsu Ogihara
- Series: Pro Evolution Soccer
- Engine: Fox Engine; Havok (physics engine) (Android, iOS)
- Platforms: Microsoft Windows; PlayStation 3; PlayStation 4; Linux; Xbox 360; Xbox One; Android; iOS
- Release: PES 2018: NA: September 12, 2017; JP: September 13, 2017; EU: September 14, 2017; PES 2018 Mobile: WW: May 24, 2017
- Genre: Sports
- Modes: Single-player, multiplayer

Pro Evolution Soccer 2018 (Note: Known in Japan as Winning Eleven 2018 (Japanese: ウイニングイレブン 2018)) (abbreviated as PES 2018) is a sports video game developed and published by Konami for Microsoft Windows, PlayStation 3, PlayStation 4, Xbox 360, Xbox One, Android and iOS. The game is the 17th installment in the Pro Evolution Soccer series and was released worldwide in September 2017. This was the final PES game released for PlayStation 3 & Xbox 360 consoles and the last to feature UEFA Champions League, UEFA Europa League, and UEFA Super Cup licenses and the Borussia Dortmund partnership. To mark its occasion, Konami recreated the "Ultimate Stage" stadium, as shown in the UEFA Champions League 2015-18 brand.

A mobile game version was released as PES 2018 Mobile for iOS and Android. It exceeded 150 million downloads, as of August 2018. The Chinese version of PES 2018 Mobile was published by NetEase. PES 2018 was succeeded by Pro Evolution Soccer 2019.

== Development ==
Konami has kept with the theme of the previous release. They announced a special "Barcelona Edition", along with a pre-order bonus content for digital downloads and physical disc versions. Barcelona, Atlético Madrid, Borussia Dortmund, and Liverpool were confirmed as being licensed at E3 2017, FC Schalke 04, Valencia, Fulham, and the Brazil national football team are licensed as well. France national football team license was confirmed in the online beta.

Konami released a demo version of Pro Evolution Soccer 2018 for download on August 30, 2017, for PlayStation 3, PlayStation 4, Xbox 360, and Xbox One. The demo version includes limited stadiums, clubs, and feature sets. A Nintendo Switch version was not developed, but Konami have said they are open to the idea of porting future games in the series.

The first data pack, titled Data Pack 1, launched on October 5, 2017, and featured 117 new player face updates, ten of the latest boots, updated backboards in Master League for Barcelona, and over 3,000 new player thumbnails. The data pack 2.0 was released on November 15, 2017. This data pack added Arsenal's Emirates Stadium, the Estadio Nacional in Santiago, Chile, and new boots and new player faces; however, the update also removes licenses for Avaí, Fluminense, São Paulo and Vasco da Gama players, replacing them with generic players. The trailer for this was released on the same date as the release of the pack.

When PES 2012 released it introduced new intelligence with the ball, positioning into space, and wingers attempt overlaps. G-cluster has announced in 2013 that PES introduces innovated improvements to facial identification of players. Along with new features the latest notes and updates are given to assist new players of features.

== Reception ==
=== Critical reception ===
Reception

Aggregate score
Aggregator	Score
Metacritic	(PC) 81/100 (PS4) 83/100 (XONE) 82/100

Review scores
Publication	Score
Famitsu	35/40
Game Informer	8.75/10
GameSpot	8/10
GamesRadar+	4/5
IGN	9.2/10

Pro Evolution Soccer 2018 received "generally favorable" reviews from critics, according to review aggregator Metacritic.

IGN called PES 2018 "Amazing; Once again, PES has set an incredibly high level of quality for other sports games to try and match" with an outstanding score of 9.2 out of 10. GameSpot called it "the most satisfying football game ever made" and said its excellent on-pitch gameplay gives it the edge over FIFA 18.

=== Commercial performance ===
Pro Evolution Soccer 2018 sold 64,342 copies on PlayStation 4 within its first week on sale in Japan, which placed it at number one on the all format sales chart.

PES 2018 Mobile exceeded 150 million downloads, as of August 2018. During May–July 2018, the game was downloaded 7.1 million times and grossed $26 million revenue. The game grossed ¥15.7 billion ($99 million) in Japan during 2018.

=== Accolades ===
Eurogamer ranked the game 43rd on their list of the "Top 50 Games of 2017". The game won the award for "Best Sports Game" at the Gamescom 2017 Awards, and was nominated for "Best Sports Game" at the Game Critics Awards, "Best Multiplayer Game" at the 35th Golden Joystick Awards, "Best Sports/Racing Game" at The Game Awards 2017, and "Best Sports/Driving Game" at the Titanium Awards. It won the award for "Best Gameplay" at Game Informer's 2017 Sports Game of the Year Awards, and was nominated for "People's Choice" at the Italian Video Game Awards.

== International competition ==
=== Asian Games ===
Pro Evolution Soccer has been used as a part of electronic sport demonstration event in Asian Games 2018 held in Indonesia. The Pro Evolution Soccer 2018 is the specific title used in this event. Eight country are able to participate after qualified from their respective regional qualification with Indonesia automatically qualifies as host.

Asian Games qualification
Means of qualification	Venue	Vacancies	Qualifier
Host country	—N/a	1	Indonesia
East Asia Qualifier	(China) Changzhou	2	Japan; Hong Kong
Southeast Asia Qualifier	Online	2	Vietnam; Malaysia
South Asia Qualifier	Online	1	India
Central Asia Qualifier	Online	1	Kazakhstan
West Asia Qualifier	Online	1	Iran

== See also ==
- FIFA 18, its competitor football game
