= FIFA 18 =

FIFA series football simulation video game

- PlayStation 4 cover art featuring Real Madrid's Cristiano Ronaldo
- Developers: EA Vancouver; EA Romania
- Publisher: EA Sports
- Composer: Junkie XL
- Series: FIFA
- Engine: Frostbite 3 (PS4, XOne, PC); Impact (PS3, X360, NS)
- Platforms: Microsoft Windows; Nintendo Switch; PlayStation 3 PlayStation 4 Xbox 360; Xbox One
- Release: 29 September 2017
- Genre: Sports
- Modes: Single-player, multiplayer

FIFA 18 is a football simulation video game developed and published by Electronic Arts and released worldwide on 29 September 2017 for Microsoft Windows, PlayStation 3, PlayStation 4, Xbox 360, Xbox One, and Nintendo Switch. It is the 25th installment in the FIFA series. Portuguese footballer Cristiano Ronaldo, at the time contracted to Real Madrid, appears as the cover athlete of the regular edition, as well as the alternate covers of the Icon and 2018 FIFA World Cup editions of the game.

FIFA 18 featured several gameplay improvements over its predecessor, FIFA 17. The game was introduced by Real Player Motion Technology, which provides more realistic player movements and animations. The PlayStation 4, Microsoft Windows and Xbox One versions include a continuation of "The Journey" a story-based mode that was originally in FIFA 17 titled "The Journey: Hunter Returns", which continues the story of fictional footballer Alex Hunter as he seeks to make a name for himself in the football world. The PlayStation 3 and Xbox 360 versions, marketed as FIFA 18: Legacy Edition, were not built on the Frostbite engine and do not contain any new gameplay features, and are hence identical to the previous release aside from updated kits and squads. FIFA 18 also includes the standard modes from previous FIFA games, including Career mode, Ultimate Team, and Online Seasons.

FIFA 18 received positive reviews upon release. Critics praised the improvements made to the gameplay, including the introduction of Real Player Motion Technology and the overhaul of the dribbling and crossing mechanics. The game's presentation, including its graphics and sound design, were also praised. FIFA 18 was a commercial success, selling over 24 million copies worldwide by the end of 2018, and becoming one of the best-selling games of the year. As of 2023, it is the most sold FIFA game of all time. It was the second instalment in the series to use the Frostbite 3 game engine, although some versions of the game use a different game engine.

The online servers for the game for Nintendo Switch, PlayStation 3 and Xbox 360 were shut down on 14 February 2023, whilst online servers for PC, PlayStation 4 and Xbox One were shut down on 6 November 2023.

== Gameplay ==
FIFA 18 is a sports game that simulates association football. The game features 52 fully licensed stadiums from 12 countries, including new stadiums, plus 30 generic fields for a total of 82. All 20 Premier League stadia are represented in the series. Commentary is once again provided by Martin Tyler and Alan Smith with Alan McInally (in-game score updates), Geoff Shreeves (injury reports) and Mike West (classified results).

FIFA 18 Ultimate Team Icons, the new version of what has previously been called Legends is playable on the PS4, Xbox One and PC versions of the game, as Legends were exclusive to Xbox One. Diego Maradona was added as a legend to the Ultimate Team, joining Brazilian stars Pelé and Ronaldo, Russian goalkeeper Lev Yashin, and French star Thierry Henry for the 95-rated card. New goal celebrations featured include Cristiano Ronaldo's "Siii" jump (accompanied with a voiceover from Ronaldo), Wayne Rooney's "Knockout", Samuel Eto'o's "Old Man" routine, Robert Lewandowski's "X", and Raúl kissing his ring finger. The Cruyff turn – a feint named after 1970s Dutch star Johan Cruyff – is one of the four new skills added to the game.

FIFA 18 features the third tier of Germany's Bundesliga, the 3. Liga. It also features the Iceland national football team, the Saudi Arabia national football team, both the men's and women's national New Zealand teams, and has again included the Turkish Super League after EA renewed its licence with them.

EA Sports introduced Quick Subs into FIFA 18 where the player can make a substitute when the ball goes out of play. Cutscenes were added to transfer and contract negotiations in Career Mode where players can watch interactive transfer negotiations happen and can also see their new signings unveiled in the news tab.

== The Journey: Hunter Returns ==
The story-based Journey mode that was introduced in FIFA 17 returns in this instalment and continues the narrative under the title "The Journey: Hunter Returns". If one completed the original story, they will begin FIFA 18 at the same club – with traits and honours, such as a Premier League title or FA Cup win, being carried over. As for those starting fresh, they will see a montage of key plot points in the game, then be able to select from any current English Premier League side. Alex Hunter, the 18-year-old main character from Clapham, London, returns and is fully customisable. Players can unlock items which include new clothes and hairstyles for Hunter. While FIFA 17 locked Hunter to the English Premier League and Championship, in FIFA 18 players can now experience new locations, such as Brazil and the United States. The trailer released for this game mode also shows numerous widely known football players making an appearance such as Cristiano Ronaldo, Antoine Griezmann, Dele Alli, Thomas Müller, Gyasi Zardes, Rio Ferdinand and Thierry Henry. NBA player James Harden is also featured in the trailer and on the video game itself. Alex Morgan and Megan Rapinoe also make cameo appearances. The story mode also has new playable characters, such as Danny Williams, who is Alex Hunter's best friend, and also featuring a character new to the series, Alex Hunter's half-sister, Kim Hunter.

=== Story ===
The story begins with a TV-style 'previously on' section that recaps the key events of the first journey. Then the game cuts to Alex Hunter and his friend Danny Williams, enjoying their last day on holiday in Brazil, before they are approached by some young kids who challenge them to a football game. After returning home to England, Alex and his team are informed about a pre-season tournament in the US, before which Alex is invited to an interview with Rio Ferdinand, but later runs into his old friend and rival Gareth Walker, who says he can not believe that Alex is still with his agent Michael Taylor. Then at the tour in LA, Alex's team faces off against Real Madrid and at the end of the match, regardless of the result, Alex swaps numbers with Cristiano Ronaldo, who suggests that Alex comes and plays for Madrid, having been impressed by his play. If the player beats Real Madrid, they play against LA Galaxy, where Hunter encounters Gyasi Zardes in the tunnel before the match starts. Alex also meets his father during the tour, and begrudgingly accepts an invitation to have dinner with him. After the tour, Alex Hunter and his teammates go to Chicago where they participate in the MLS All-Star Game.

Following the first game of the new Premier League season, Michael tells Alex that none other than Real Madrid are keen on signing him. Despite it being a risky move with Alex who is still in his youth, he decides to follow his dreams, and put forward a transfer request. This causes both Alex's teammates and the fans to lose faith in his commitment to the team – even to the point of the fans booing him when he is subbed on during a game. Just one day before the transfer window closes, Michael reveals that he found out that the Real Madrid deal was a scam, and that they were never interested in him joining their team. While the club executive appreciates that neither Michael or Alex had any reason to believe the deal was fake, it does not counter the fact that Alex put a transfer request in – meaning that he wanted to leave. Alex is subsequently pulled from the senior squad and put on the youth squad. With just hours until the deadline, Michael admits that he really wanted to sign Alex with Madrid because he was falling behind in his reputation as an agent, and so he went with the deal without really thinking too much. Alex is enraged at Michael for gambling his football career for his personal gain, and the player is then given the option to forgive Michael and stay with him, or fire him due to his almost career ending mistake.

Regardless of the player's decision, Alex then gets a call from his Dad, who is now working for LA Galaxy. The team offer him a contract to play for LA, due to some injuries their strikers have suffered from. With no other option to go for, aside from training with the youth squad, Alex accepts the deal, helping the team to reach the playoffs. Shortly after he arrives in the US, a young girl recognizes him in the changing rooms. While dining out with his father, Alex learns that she is Kim Hunter – his half sister. Less than impressed with his father for not telling him about Kim, Alex storms off, but later comes to support Kim during her international debut for the US ladies against Germany. With Christmas coming around, Alex returns home to England after the season with LA ends, but gives Kim their grandfather's football for luck in her future games.

After reuniting with Danny, who signed up with Alex's former club when he left, Alex learns that Atlético Madrid, PSG, and Bayern Munich are interested in signing him (if the player kept Michael, he signs him or if the player fired him, Alex is signed by his dad). Alex signs to one of them and when he arrives finds out that Dino, the manager of Alex's former loan club, is at his new club as well. Dino pairs Alex up with either Thomas Muller, Antoine Griezmann, or Dele Alli, the player serving as Alex's strike partner. Just three games in however, Alex suffers a knee injury that sidelines him from the pitch for most of the season. At this point the game switches to Danny Williams' perspective, whose career at Alex's former club is at risk. After playing a game, the player is given the option to either play as Williams and try and save his career, or simply give it up and take control of Hunter in the next chapter.

Having recovered from his injury in rehab, Alex meets up with Kim for a kick around before going back to his European team, where he finds out that Dino's job is at risk, and he may be fired if the club does not win any silverware by the season's end. If Hunter plays well and wins the league or cup final, Dino keeps his job. If not, Dino will indeed be fired and Alex helps him clean out his desk.

After the season ends, Alex takes Jim over to the US to meet Kim for the first time and they dine at the restaurant. After he eats, Alex receives a call from an agent who claims to have been keeping her eye on him. She offers to make him an icon and tells him to meet up with her, leading into his appearance in FIFA 19.

== Development ==
FIFA 18 was developed and published by Electronic Arts. In January 2017, during the Nintendo Switch Presentation, EA announced a custom-built port of FIFA 18 on the Nintendo Switch console. It runs on an internally developed game engine, as opposed to Frostbite engine that several versions of the game run on. While the Switch version includes a career mode, it excludes the story-based Journey mode. The Switch version runs at a resolution of 1080p at 60 frames per second when docked to a TV, and 720p at 60 frames per second in the handheld/tabletop mode. The Switch version marks the first time Ultimate Team ever made an appearance on a Nintendo system. Features exclusive to the Switch version include local multiplayer in the form of the new mode Local Seasons, allowing up to two Nintendo Switches to connect and compete in a five-match sequence. Another mode exclusive to Switch is the Switch Kick-Off mode, allowing players to instantly get into local/solo matches.

The faces for Forest Green Rovers were captured for the game, a first for a club outside of Europe's top leagues. EA chose the club after they were promoted to the Football League after a 128-year wait.

== Release ==
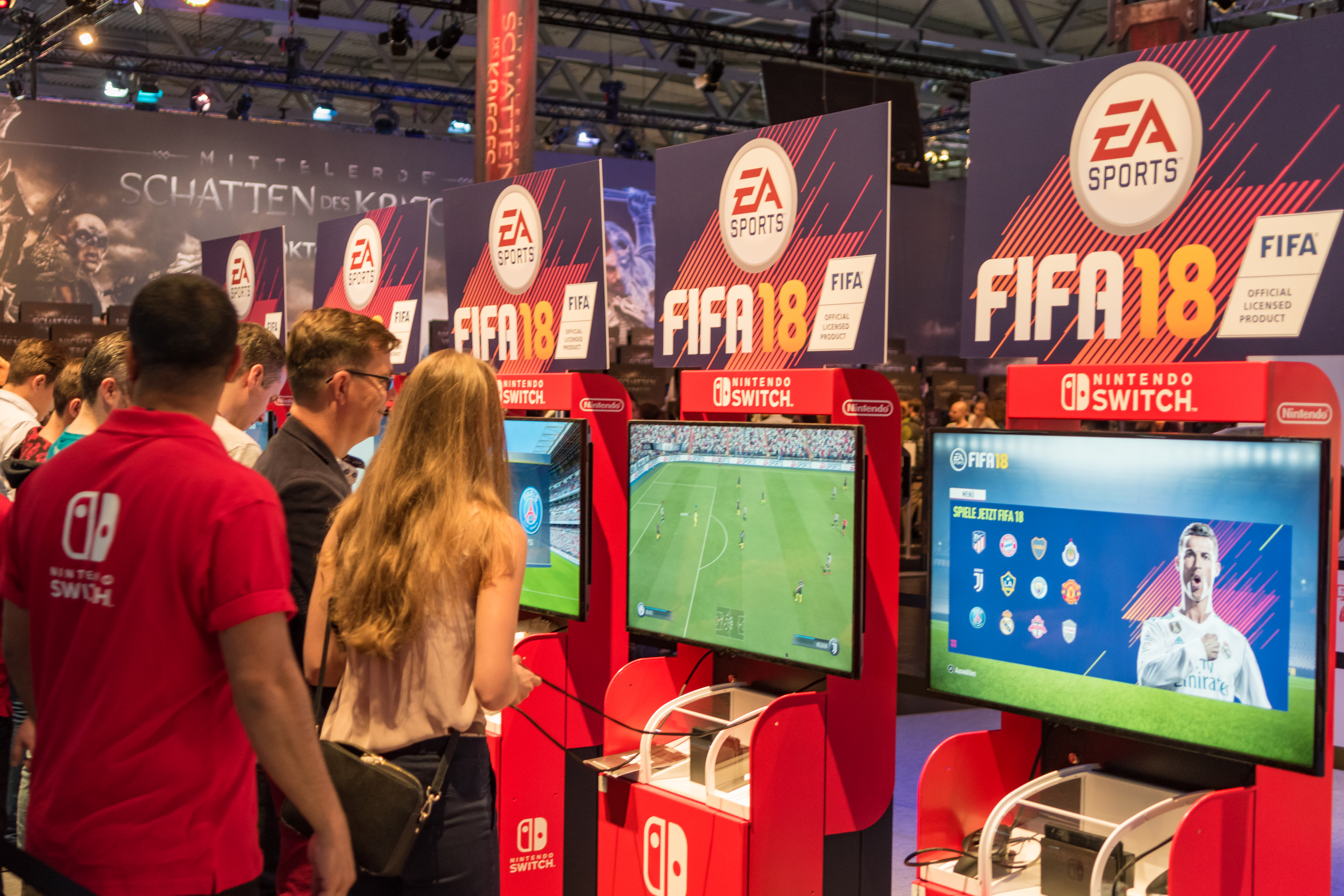
FIFA 18 in a GamesCon

FIFA 18 was released worldwide on 29 September 2017 for Microsoft Windows, PlayStation 4, PlayStation 3, Xbox 360, Xbox One and Nintendo Switch. Cristiano Ronaldo is featured on the cover of the game's retail box.

=== Downloadable content ===
On 30 April 2018, EA announced a free expansion based on the 2018 FIFA World Cup, featuring all 32 teams that qualified, all 12 stadiums used at the 2018 FIFA World Cup as well as the ability for players to create their own customized World Cup tournaments and 17 other national teams that did not qualify: Austria, Canada, Chile, China, Czech Republic, Greece, Italy, Netherlands, New Zealand, Northern Ireland, Norway, Republic of Ireland, Romania, Scotland, Turkey, United States and Wales. It was released on 29 May 2018 for the PC, Nintendo Switch, PlayStation 4 and Xbox One versions of the game, with FIFA Mobile getting the mode for a limited time only on 6 June 2018, and FIFA Online 4 getting the mode for a limited time only on 31 May 2018.

== Reception ==
Reception

Aggregate score
Aggregator	Score
Metacritic	84/100 (XONE); 84/100 (PS4); 81/100 (PC); 68/100 (NS)

Review scores
Publication	Score
Game Informer	8.75/10
GameRevolution	4.5/5 stars
GameSpot	7/10
GamesRadar+	4.5/5 stars
IGN	8.1/10 (NS) 5.5/10

FIFA 18 received "generally favourable" reviews for the PS4, Xbox One and PC versions of the game, while the Nintendo Switch version received "mixed or average" reviews from critics, according to review aggregator website Metacritic.

In their review scoring 7 out of 10, GameSpot wrote, "From the variety of game modes on offer and how everything's presented, to the constant updates in FUT's Team of the Week, Daily Objectives, and discussion of real-world happenings in commentary, FIFA 18 captures the world of football and confidently translates it into a video game. On the pitch, however, EA's soccer series is still lagging far behind PES 2018's more fluid, satisfying football." IGN gave it an 8.1/10, saying, "A sharp focus on attack but few new additions make this a spectacular if somewhat shallow experience."

=== Accolades ===
Eurogamer ranked the game 30th on their list of the "Top 50 Games of 2017". The game won the award for "Best Sports Game" at the 2017 Game Critics Awards, and was nominated for "Best Console Game (Nintendo Switch)" and "Best Sports Game" at the Gamescom 2017 Awards. It was also nominated for "Best Multiplayer Game" at the Golden Joystick Awards, for "Best Sports/Racing Game" at The Game Awards 2017, and for "Best Sports/Driving Game" at the Titanium Awards. It won the award for "Best Story" at Game Informer's 2017 Sports Game of the Year Awards, while it took the lead for "Best Sports Game" in their Reader's Choice Best of 2017 Awards. It won the awards for "Best Music Supervision in a Video Game" at the Guild of Music Supervisors Awards, and for "Sports Game of the Year" at the 21st Annual D.I.C.E. Awards, and was nominated for "Game, Franchise Sports" at the 17th Annual National Academy of Video Game Trade Reviewers Awards, and for "eSports Game of the Year" at the 2018 SXSW Gaming Awards. It won the award for "Best Selling Game" at the Italian Video Game Awards, whereas its other nomination was for "People's Choice". It was also nominated for "Best Game" at BBC Radio 1's Teen Awards.

=== Sales ===
In September 2018, EA Sports announced that the game sold more than 24 million with all of its versions.

=== Controversy ===
FIFA 18 faced a backlash from fans due to its bugs and microtransactions system in Ultimate Team mode which makes it pay-to-win resulting in a Black Friday boycott by fans in November 2017 and a petition being launched by fans with the hashtag #FixFifa. Players criticized EA of changing the game through patches which resulted in large amounts of glitches and bugs in the game, players not getting what they paid for, and the need to spend a large amount of real currency to obtain a decent Ultimate Team. FIFA Ultimate Team packs have been called loot boxes in another name and the similarity to addictive gambling due to their use of variable-ratio scheduling used in gambling. Players also accused Ultimate Team packs of having mediocre drop rates. FIFA 18, alongside several other EA games such as Star Wars: Battlefront II, are also under investigation by countries such as Belgium for their loot box systems.
