= Pro Evolution Soccer 2019 =

2018 video game

- PlayStation 4 cover featuring FC Barcelona player Philippe Coutinho
- Developer: PES Productions
- Publishers: Konami; NetEase (Android, iOS Chinese ver.)
- Director: Yoshikatsu Ogihara
- Series: Pro Evolution Soccer
- Engine: Fox Engine; Unreal Engine 4 (Android, iOS); Havok (physics engine) (Android, iOS Chinese ver.)
- Platforms: Microsoft Windows; PlayStation 4 Xbox One; Android iOS
- Release: NA: 28 August 2018; WW: 30 August 2018; Android, iOS: NA: 13 December 2018; WW: 15 December 2018
- Genre: Sports
- Modes: Single-player, multiplayer

Pro Evolution Soccer 2019 (Note: Japanese: ウイニングイレブン2019, Hepburn: Uiningu Irebun 2019) (abbreviated as PES 2019) is a football simulation video game developed by PES Productions and published by Konami for Microsoft Windows, PlayStation 4, and Xbox One. It is the 18th installment in the PES series and was released on 28 August 2018 in North America and 30 August 2018 in Japan, Europe, and Australia. During that time, Philippe Coutinho, winger for FC Barcelona, appeared on the cover of the standard edition, while David Beckham appeared on the front cover of the legend edition. Scottish clubs Celtic and Rangers were added to the game along with their stadiums, highlighting the Old Firm derby. This was the final installment in the franchise to be branded as PES, following the decision to rebrand it eFootball Pro Evolution Soccer, EFootball PES 2020, and later as eFootball.

Konami aimed to increase the number of licenses, which included more fully licensed leagues and stadiums and a variety of new legends of soccer to play with. Until then, the official championships announced directly by Konami were 12 leagues which include the Ligue 1 and Ligue 2, Danish Superligaen, the Portuguese Primeira Liga, the Belgian Jupiler Pro League, the Swiss Raiffeisen Super League, the Scottish Premiership, the Dutch Eredivisie, the Argentine Primera División. However, Konami announced that it did not renew its deal with UEFA for the Champions League, Europa League, and the UEFA Super Cup, which they had for 10 years; the license is being used in EA Sports FIFA 19. PES 2019 was succeeded by eFootball Pro Evolution Soccer 2020.

== Gameplay ==
PES 2019 is a sports simulation video-game. The game aims to replicate real-life football matches with individual players possessing unique skills and play styles reflective of their real-world counterparts. Notably, players such as Lionel Messi are modeled to play similarly to their real-life counterparts with features such as a low center of gravity and a powerful left foot. In addition, the game offers the ability to customize goal celebrations for added personalization.

== Development ==
PES 2019's Magic Moments was a new feature of the series. Konami announced the International Champions Cup before the season began had been added, and they also announced an improved negotiation system and budget management. They also added re-sell and clean sheet options to introduce strategy in club management. 11 new skill traits were introduced, including edge turn, no look pass, control loop, dipping shot, and rising shot. They also announced that player individuality has been expanded, where skills and strengths are more prominent in impact and motion during game play. Full body touch introduced in the previous installment was also enhanced. Other features include a number of graphical boosts and 4K HDR support across all compatible platforms. Enlighten software was used to rework lighting, both natural and stadium based. Stands and pitches closely mirror their real life counterparts depending on the time of day.

=== Kit unveiling ===
For the first time in history, a Pro Evolution Soccer game was used in a kit unveiling. Liverpool unveiled their new 3rd kit for the 2018–2019 football season by using in-game footage from PES 2019 via a post on social media. Liverpool claims they are the "first club to use video game graphics to launch a new jersey".

=== UEFA license ===
The Konami–UEFA partnership ended after ten years. The announcement was made in a press release posted on the UEFA website stating that "the 2018 UEFA Champions League Final in Kyiv would mark the end of a very successful and fruitful 10-year partnership between Konami and UEFA."

The marketing director of UEFA Events SA Guy-Laurent Epstein said:

Konami has been a strong licensing partner for the UEFA Champions League and UEFA Europa League, with our competition brand being heavily featured within the video game and as part of the popular Konami-organised UEFA Champions League e-sports tournaments. UEFA would like to thank Konami for its tremendous commitment and support to UEFA club competitions for the last decade, and we look forward to continue to work with Konami in the sphere of UEFA national team football," whereas senior director of brand & business development for Konami Digital Entertainment B.V. Jonas Lygaard said, "The UEFA Champions League licence has given us a platform to create unique experiences and provide football fans from all over the world with an opportunity to enjoy this competition first-hand. This year, however, we will shift our focus to other areas. We will continue to explore alternative ways UEFA and Konami can continue to work together, as our relationship remains strong.

== Club partnerships ==
Konami signed a number of partnerships with clubs to faithfully re-create the clubs including kits, fully scanned players, and stadiums.

=== Continuing agreements ===
Previously announced partnerships between Konami and Liverpool, Barcelona, Inter Milan, A.C. Milan, and Arsenal for PES 2018 were retained for the 2019 edition of the game.

=== Borussia Dortmund agreement ===
On 1 June 2018, Konami announced on their website that top German club Borussia Dortmund would not be officially licensed for PES 2019. This is despite the club appearing in some of the promotional assets of the game. Konami said "the license agreement was to the use of Borussia Dortmund's logos, players, stadium, and other features in the Konami products until June 2020. However, this agreement was prematurely terminated by Borussia Dortmund".

=== FC Schalke 04 ===
On 4 June 2018, Konami announced a new partnership with FC Schalke 04 just days after Dortmund terminated their agreement. As part of their establishment with FC Schalke 04 as a PES partner club, Konami produced a highly detailed recreation of the club's VELTINS-Arena with the use of state-of-the art 3D scanning technology with extremely high fidelity, detailed kits, player likenesses, and a real-world shirt and ground sponsorship. Alexander Jobst, Schalke's marketing director, stated how Schalke was happy to have on board a world-famous game manufacturer like Konami. It shows the leading role that FC Schalke 04 has in E-Sports internationally. "Konami is like no other company and allows our fans to play with the true S04 in game", he said. Brand and Business Development at Konami, Jonas Lygaard said, "FC Schalke 04 is one of the most famous and successful clubs in Europe and is working hard in the domain of E-Sports. That suits Konami."

=== AS Monaco ===
On 19 July 2018, Konami announced a new partnership with AS Monaco. As part of the partnership agreement, AS Monaco captain Radamel Falcao became an official local ambassador of the game and appears on the cover of the French edition of the game alongside global cover star Philippe Coutinho. Along with kits and players, AS Monaco's stadium, Stade Louis II, is available after release via DLC. "This is a wide-ranging agreement with AS Monaco, which will see this illustrious club working closely with KONAMI across a number of avenues," commented Jonas Lygaard, Senior Director Brand and Business Development at Konami Digital Entertainment B.V. "In addition to working closely with the club to ensure they are perfectly recreated within the game; we are delighted that a player of Radamel Falcao's caliber has agreed to become our local Ambassador. We look forward to a long and productive partnership that will show the scale and ambition Konami has for the PES series."

Juli Ferre, AS Monaco commercial and marketing director, said, "The growth of E-Sports and the reputation of the PES series make this partnership with Konami very exciting; we look forward to seeing AS Monaco players recreated within the new game and our Captain Radamel Falcao featured on the PES 2019 cover."

=== Celtic and Rangers ===
On 30 July 2018, Konami announced a new partnership with Celtic, before announcing a partnership with Glasgow rivals Rangers the day after. As part of both partnership agreements, a special, limited club edition of the game is available, and the clubs' stadiums, Celtic Park and Ibrox, are available in the game via DLC.

Gordon Kaye, Head of Business Development at Celtic, said of the partnership, "We are delighted to be partnering with Konami at such an exciting time for the PES series. The game play and player detail in PES 2019 is simply stunning and we have no doubt Celtic fans will be excited at the prospect of seeing the double treble champions emulated in such a realistic way." Jonas Lygaard, Senior Director of Brand & Business Development at Konami Digital Entertainment B.V., said, "Celtic is a hugely successful club, and we are delighted to be working closely with them. Our job now is to ensure Celtic's presence is perfectly recreated within PES 2019, and we look forward to seeing the fans’ reactions when all the work being put into this is complete and we reveal everything – more updates coming soon – watch this space!"

Rangers Managing Director Stewart Robertson said, "We are delighted to have entered into this new partnership with Konami and are excited to see the club and the players perfectly represented within PES 2019." Jonas Lygaard, Senior Director of Brand & Business Development at Konami Digital Entertainment B.V., commented, "With this partnership with Rangers we add another massive club to the growing PES roster. Scottish football enjoys some of the loudest and most ardent fans of any league, and we look forward to this passion manifesting as Rangers makes its debut in PES 2019."

== Teams ==
In total, 355 clubs are present in the game; out of these, 293 are licensed. This marks an increase of twenty-two additional club sides compared with PES 2018. A total of 79 more clubs are licensed. Seventeen leagues are playable in the game, fourteen licensed, along with the AFC Champions League. There are ten additional licensed leagues and four more leagues overall when compared with the previous edition of the game.

=== Official partners ===
Nineteen clubs are official partners of Konami. In most cases, the partnerships enable Konami to include the stadiums of the partnered clubs and also to have player scans of all first team players in the game from these sides. Twelve clubs are continuing their partnership deals from previous seasons: Milan, Alianza Lima, Barcelona, Colo-Colo, Corinthians, Flamengo, Independiente, Inter, Liverpool, Palmeiras, River Plate, and Sporting Cristal.

Five new clubs have announced partnership deals since the release of Pro Evolution Soccer 2018, with PES 2019 being the first game of the partnership deal. These clubs are Celtic, Monaco, Rangers, São Paulo, and Schalke 04. São Paulo was licensed in PES 2018, without a partnership deal, whereas Monaco and Schalke 04 were licensed in the previous game as part of their league's license deal. Celtic was last featured as a licensed club in PES 2014; Rangers, in PES 2012.

Celtic and Rangers (both Scottish Premiership); Colo-Colo (Chilean Primera División); Corinthians, Flamengo, Palmeiras, São Paulo, and Vasco da Gama (all Campeonato Brasileiro Série A); Independiente and River Plate (both Argentine Primera División); and Monaco (Ligue 1) would have been licensed by their league's licensing deal without any partnership deal; however, the partnership deal ensures that their players have face scans and that their stadiums appear in the game – unlike other clubs in their leagues.

=== Competitions ===
Fifteen leagues are fully licensed in the game. All the teams of these leagues appearing feature real players, kits, and logos. The licenses for the Brazilian Campeonato Brasileiro Série A, French Ligue 1 & Ligue 2, and the Dutch Eredivisie are retained. Ten new league licenses have been obtained: the Colombian Categoría Primera A, the Argentine Primera División, the Belgian First Division A, the Chilean Primera División, the Danish Superliga, the Portuguese Primeira Liga, the Russian Premier League, the Scottish Premiership, the Swiss Super League, and the Turkish Süper Lig. The Russian Premier League deal is exclusive.

The Argentine Primera División appeared in PES 2018 with licensed teams but unlicensed league names, featuring as the Argentine League. Additionally, the Primeira Liga was featured as an unlicensed league, being referred to in-game as Portugal League, with fictional team names aside the Big Three – Benfica, Porto, and Sporting CP. On 28 September, Konami announced that an exclusivity agreement was reached with Argentinian side Boca Juniors.

Konami has retained the license for the AFC Champions League, remaining in the game since its introduction in PES 2014.

The English Premier League and EFL Championship, the Italian Serie A, and the Spanish La Liga appear as unlicensed leagues in the game, as with previous editions. These leagues, however, feature real players. Serie A, referred to in-game as Italian League, have all clubs licensed, except Juventus. Fictional versions of the second divisions in Italy and Spain do not feature in the game, unlike in previous seasons. A new league, Thailand's Thai League, was announced on 4 September 2018.

=== Other licensed clubs ===
Twelve additional clubs are licensed in the game without being partnered with and without their league being licensed in the game. These are Brazilian club RB Brasil, Croatians Dinamo Zagreb, Czech side Slavia Prague, German side Bayer Leverkusen, the Greek quartet of AEK Athens, Olympiacos, Panathinaikos and PAOK, Romanian side FCSB, Ukraine's big two of Dynamo Kyiv and Shakhtar Donetsk and the Swedish team Malmö FF.

Argentine club Guillermo Brown and German teams Borussia Dortmund and RB Leipzig do not appear in the game, despite appearing in PES 2018 as additionally licensed clubs.

=== Official Club Partnerships ===
- (Spain) FC Barcelona
- (Spain) Valencia CF
- (England) Chelsea
- (England) Real Madrid [¹⁸]
- (England) Arsenal
- (England) Spurs
- (Germany) Bayern Munich
- (Germany) Eintracht Frankfurt
- (Germany) VFL Wolfsburg
- (Greece) AEK Athens
- (Italy) AC Milan
- (Italy) AS Roma
- (Italy) Atalanta BC
- (Italy) Inter
- (Italy) S.S.C. Napoli
- (France) Monaco
- (France) Paris Saint-Germain
- (Netherlands) Ajax
- (Netherlands) PSV Eindhoven
- (Portugal) SL Benfica
- (Portugal) FC Porto
- (Portugal) Sporting CP
- (Belgium) Club Brugge
- (Scotland) Celtic
- (Scotland) Rangers
- (Denmark) FC Copenhagen
- (Switzerland) FC Zürich

=== Fully Licensed Leagues ===
- (Belgium) Jupiler Pro League
- (Denmark) Superliga
- (France) Ligue 1 Conforama
- (France) Domino's Ligue 2
- (Netherlands) Eredivisie
- (Portugal) Liga NOS
- (Russia) Russian Premier League
- (Scotland) Ladbrokes Premiership
- (Switzerland) Raiffeisen Super League
- (Turkey) Spor Toto Süper Lig
- (Argentina) Superliga Quilmes Clásica
- (Brazil) Campeonato Brasileiro
- (Chile) Campeonato Nacional Scotiabank
- (Colombia) Liga Águila
- (Thailand) Toyota Thai League (Data Pack 2.0)
- (China) Chinese Super League (Data Pack 2.0)
- (Japan) J1 League (Mobile only)
- (Japan) J2 League (Mobile only)

== Stadiums ==
=== Licensed ===
- (Argentina) La Bombonera (Boca Juniors)
- El Monumental (River Plate and Argentina)
- (Brazil) Allianz Parque (Palmeiras)
- (Brazil) Arena Corinthians (Corinthians)
- (Brazil) Estádio Beira-Rio (Internacional)
- (Brazil) Estádio do Maracanã (Flamengo & Fluminense)
- (Brazil) Estádio do Morumbi (São Paulo)
- (Brazil) Estádio Palestra Itália (Palmeiras) (Data Pack 3.0)
- (Brazil) Estádio São Januário (Vasco da Gama)
- (Brazil) Estádio Urbano Caldeira (Santos)
- (Brazil) Mineirão (Cruzeiro)
- (Chile) Estadio Monumental (Colo-Colo)
- Estadio Nacional de Chile (Chile)
- (England) Anfield (Liverpool)
- (England) Emirates Stadium (Arsenal)
- Stade Louis II (Monaco) (Data Pack 2.0)
- (Germany) Veltins-Arena (Schalke 04)
- (Italy) San Siro (Inter and Milan)
- (Italy) Stadio Olimpico (AS Roma and SS Lazio)
- Saitama Stadium 2002 (Urawa Red Diamonds and Japan)
- (Netherlands) Johan Cruyff Arena (Ajax)
- (Netherlands) De Kuip (Feyenoord) (Data Pack 3.0)
- (Peru) Estadio Alejandro Villanueva (Alianza Lima)
- (Portugal) Estádio José Alvalade (Sporting CP)
- (Scotland) Celtic Park (Celtic) (DLC)
- (Scotland) Ibrox (Rangers) (DLC)
- (Spain) Camp Nou (Barcelona)
- (Switzerland) St. Jakob-Park (FC Basel)
- (Turkey) Şükrü Saracoğlu Stadium (Fenerbahçe)

=== PES Originals ===
- KONAMI Stadium
- Neu Sonne Arena
- Metropole Arena
- Hoofdstad Stadion
- Estadio Campeones
- Estadio de Escorpião
- Estadio del Nuevo Triunfo
- Stade de Sagittaire
- Stadio Orione
- Burg Stadion
- Estadio del Martingal
- Rose Park Stadium
- Coliseo de los Deportes
- Sports Park
- Village Road
- Stadio Nazionale
- Estadio del Tauro
- PES LEAGUE Stadium

== Commentary ==
- English Language: Peter Drury and Jim Beglin
- French Language: Grégoire Margotton and Darren Tulett
- German Language: Marco Hagemann and Hansi Kupper
- Italian Language: Fabio Caressa and Luca Marchegiani
- Spanish Language: Julio Maldonado and Roberto Martinez
- Argentine Spanish Language: Rodolfo De Paoli and Diego Latorre
- Brazilian Portuguese Language: Milton Leite and Mauro Beting
- Japanese Language: Jon Kabira and Tsuyoshi Kitazawa
- Arabic Language: Fahd Al-Otaibi

== Reception ==
Reception

Aggregate score
Aggregator	Score
Metacritic	(PC) 80/100 (PS4) 79/100 (XONE) 82/100

Review scores
Publication	Score
Game Informer	8.5/10
GameRevolution	8/10
GameSpot	9/10
GamesRadar+	4/5
IGN	8.2/10
PC Gamer (US)	68/100
Push Square	7/10
The Guardian	3/5
USgamer	3/5

In Japan, Winning Eleven 2019 sold 187,453 copies as of January 2018. In the United Kingdom, PES 2019 opened at number one on the software sales chart, but opening-week sales were down 42% compared to PES 2018.

PES 2019 has received positive reviews. On Metacritic, the PlayStation 4 version has a score of 79 based on 53 reviews, indicating "generally favorable reviews". The game generally received praise for its gameplay, but criticism for its lack of licenses. GameSpot rated it 9 out of 10, stating that it made "brilliant strides on the pitch, building on what was already an incredibly satisfying game of football to produce one of the greatest playing football games of all time." IGN rated it 8.2 out of 10, stating that its "focus on individual brilliance brings players to life and gives the game an extra dimension of authenticity."

=== Accolades ===
Year	Award	Category	Result	Ref.
2018	Game Critics Awards	Best Sports Game	Nominated	
2018	Gamescom	Best Sports Game	Nominated	
2018	Golden Joystick Awards	Best Competitive Game	Nominated	
2018	The Game Awards 2018	Best Sports/Racing	Nominated	
2018	Titanium Awards	Best Sports/Driving Game	Nominated	
2019	National Academy of Video Game Trade Reviewers Awards	Game, Franchise Sports	Nominated	
2019	National Academy of Video Game Trade Reviewers Awards	Performance in a Sports Game (Peter Drury and Jim Beglin)	Nominated	
2019	Italian Video Game Awards	People's Choice	Nominated	
2019	Italian Video Game Awards	Best Sport Game	Nominated	
