= EFootball PES 2020 =

2019 football simulation video game

eFootball PES 2020
- Promotional image of the game featuring FC Barcelona player Lionel Messi
- Developer: PES Productions
- Publishers: Konami; NetEase (mobile, China only)
- Director: Yoshikatsu Ogihara
- Series: eFootball Pro Evolution Soccer
- Engine: Fox Engine; Unreal Engine 4 (Android, iOS)
- Platforms: Microsoft Windows; PlayStation 4 Xbox One; Android iOS
- Release: WW: 10 September 2019; JP: 12 September 2019; 2021 Season Update: WW: 15 September 2020
- Genre: Sports
- Modes: Single-player, multiplayer

eFootball PES 2020 (eFootball Pro Evolution Soccer 2020) is a football simulation video game developed by PES Productions and published by Konami for Microsoft Windows, PlayStation 4, Xbox One, Android, and IOS. The game is the 19th installment in the eFootball Pro Evolution Soccer series and was launched worldwide on 10 September 2019 and in Japan on 12 September 2019.

This year's edition features a name change with the addition of 'eFootball' within the title, symbolising a push in the online gaming space with a focus on eFootball Pro tournaments. Lionel Messi returned as the cover star of the standard edition, which was the first since his last appearance on the cover of Pro Evolution Soccer 2011 (and the first after having been the cover athlete of rival series FIFA between FIFA 13 and 16), alongside PES ambassadors Serge Gnabry, Miralem Pjanić and Scott McTominay, each representing one of the game's partner clubs (FC Barcelona, Bayern Munich, Juventus and Manchester United respectively). Ronaldinho was featured on the cover of the legend edition. PES 2020 is the last game in the series to use Kojima Productions's Fox Engine. It is also the last installment in the franchise to use the PES name and branding as the following installment was just named eFootball and is free to play.

The mobile version reached 300 million downloads by June 2020.

== Club partnerships ==
=== FC Barcelona ===
A renewed agreement between Konami and FC Barcelona was announced, demonstrating a continued relationship with the Catalan club. Together with this announcement, it was also confirmed that a special Barcelona edition will be released.

=== Manchester United ===
Manchester United and Konami announced an agreement which would see the club, its stadiums and players recreated within the game. The current squad have also been created using a full-body 3D scanning process, providing players of the game with realistic avatars.

=== Bayern Munich ===
After the announcement of the demo—which came out on 30 July 2019, FC Bayern Munich was announced as an official partner club. Players will have the full experience with authentic kits, full 3D scanned players and, exclusively, Bayern's home ground, Allianz Arena.

=== Juventus ===
Juventus returned from PES 2020. They signed an exclusive partnership with the game, which will see it includes the club kits, player names, and stadium in-game. This makes it the first time in 25 years that the FIFA series will not hold the license for the club. As a result, the club was known in FIFA 20 as "Piemonte Calcio".

=== Arsenal ===
On 28 June 2019, Arsenal announced a 3-year extension to their partnership with Konami, which would see a highly detailed recreation of Emirates Stadium, as well as access to club legends and first-team players.

=== AS Monaco ===
In July 2018, AS Monaco partnered with Konami for PES 2019. They renewed this agreement in 2020, which includes all access to real players and their stadium. The French version of the game also features Radamel Falcao and Philippe Coutinho.

=== Celtic ===
Celtic reappeared as a licensed club in PES 2019 and have renewed their contract with Konami for the 2021 Season Update. This means players will have full access to their kits, emblem, players, and stadium.

== Game modes ==
Included for the first time in the PES series, there is a new game mode called Matchday Mode. Players around the world will help their team to glory one match at a time in the new Matchday mode. Konami will choose an important match or derby game each week, players will then be able to decide which team they want to represent on Matchday.

Master League has also received a number of revamps, most notably containing a story-like progression, with all-new cutscenes taking place in staff meetings, training sessions or press conferences, as well as objectives to be accomplished based on replies given by the player on those cutscenes.

Data Pack 7 was released on 4 June 2020. The update was related to UEFA Euro 2020 and the content included the official kits and player likenesses for all 55 officially licensed UEFA teams. The update also included 5 out of 11 venues of the tournament, as well as the official match ball. This is also the last PES to have the UEFA Euro and UEFA license altogether.

== Teams ==
=== Competitions ===
Nineteen leagues are fully licensed in the game. All the teams in these leagues feature real players, kits and logos, although a minority of the players in the Brazilian leagues still appear with generic names. Three new league licenses were obtained: the Italian Serie A, Italian Serie B (unlicensed at launch), and the Brazilian Campeonato Brasileiro Série B.

Konami have retained the license for the AFC Champions League, remaining in the game since its introduction in PES 2014. With this, debutants for 2019 AFC Champions League, Gyeongnam, Al Zawraa, Daegu and Johor Darul Ta'zim also appear for the first time in this franchise.

The English Premier League (with the exceptions of Manchester united and Arsenal), EFL Championship, Spanish La Liga (except for Barcelona and Mallorca) and Segunda División will appear as unlicensed leagues in the game. These leagues will, however, feature real players. Serie A have all clubs licensed, apart from Brescia.

Thai League 1 and Chinese Super League are also included.

=== Leagues ===
==== Fully Licensed ====
- Belgian First Division
- Danish Superliga
- Ligue 1 and Ligue 2
- Serie A and Serie B
- Eredivisie
- Primeira Liga
- Russian Premier League
- Scottish Premiership
- Swiss Super League
- Süper Lig
- Argentine Primera División
- Brasileiro Série A and Série B
- Chilean Primera División
- Categoría Primera A
- Chinese Super League
- Thai League 1

== Commentary ==
- Arabic language: Fahd Al-Otaibi
- Chinese language: Wang Tao and Miao Kun
  Hong Kong Cantonese: Vince Ng and Keyman Ma
- English language: Peter Drury and Jim Beglin
- French language: Grégoire Margotton and Darren Tulett
- German language: Marco Hagemann and Hansi Kupper
- Greek language: Christos Sotirakopoulos and Yiorgos Thanailakis
- Italian language: Fabio Caressa and Luca Marchegiani
- Japanese language: Jon Kabira and Tsuyoshi Kitazawa
- Portuguese language: Pedro Sousa and Luís Freitas Lobo
  Brazilian Portuguese: Milton Leite and Mauro Beting
- Spanish language: Julio Maldonado and Carlos Martinez
  Argentine Spanish: Rodolfo De Paoli and Diego Latorre
  Chilean Spanish: Claudio Palma and Aldo Schiappacasse
  Mexican Spanish: Christian Martinoli and Luis García Postigo

== Reception ==
Reception

Aggregate score
Aggregator	Score
Metacritic	(PS4) 82/100 (XONE) 82/100 (PC) 81/100

Review scores
Publication	Score
GameSpot	9/10
GamesRadar+	4/5
IGN	8.3/10
PC Gamer (UK)	77/100
Push Square	7/10
Stuff	4/5
The Irish Times	4/5

By the end of September 2019, the PES franchise had sold 106.8 million copies. By December 2020, the franchise had sold 111 million copies, an increase of 4.2 million between October 2019 and December 2020.

eFootball PES 2020 received generally positive reviews from critics for all platforms.

=== Awards ===
Year	Award	Category	Result	Ref.
2019	Game Critics Awards	Best Sports Game	Won	
2019	Gamescom	Best Sports Game	Nominated	
2019	2019 Golden Joystick Awards	Best Multiplayer Game	Nominated	
2019	Titanium Awards	Best Sports/Racing Game	Nominated	
2019	The Game Awards 2019	Best Sports/Racing Game	Nominated	

== Mesut Özil controversy ==
In December 2019, Arsenal midfielder Mesut Özil was completely removed from the Mandarin version in Mainland China, after the fallout surrounding his tweet condemning the Chinese government crackdown on Uyghurs. According to NetEase Games, they stated that his comments "hurt the feelings of Chinese fans and violated the sport's spirit of love and peace. We do not understand, accept or forgive this."

== eFootball PES 2021 Season Update ==
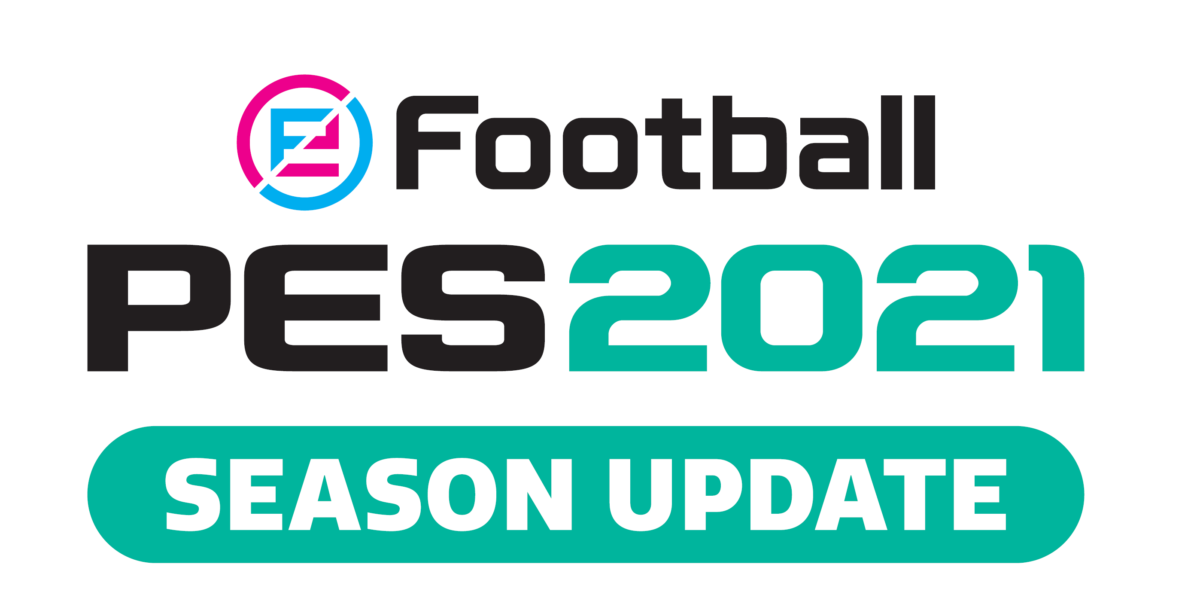

On 15 July 2020, it was announced that eFootball PES 2021 Season Update would be released in celebration of the series' 25th anniversary, due to PES Productions focusing development efforts on the upcoming eFootball and its first year entitled eFootball 2022. Konami made a "Season Update" to focus on the development. It also acts as a separate game from eFootball PES 2020, meaning that it will not be required to play, thus making it the twentieth and final installment of the Pro Evolution Soccer series.

Lionel Messi (Barcelona) is the cover star of the standard edition, alongside PES ambassadors Cristiano Ronaldo (Juventus), Alphonso Davies (Bayern Munich), and Marcus Rashford (Manchester United), each representing one of the game's partner clubs.

Konami announced an exclusive multi-year partnership with A.S. Roma and S.S. Lazio, while A.C. Milan and Inter Milan are not featured after they signed exclusive partnership deals with EA Sports, and instead are known as Milano RN and Lombardia NA respectively.

The Season Update was released for PlayStation 4, Xbox One and Windows on 15 September. A mobile version simply called eFootball PES 2021 was released for iOS and Android on 26 October.

== Trivia ==
- Hong Kong Football Association officially held an e-sports tournament during the coronavirus pandemic, which was mainly contested by footballers from the 10 clubs of the 2019–2020 Hong Kong Premier League despite none of the clubs appearing in the video game. The edit data of the league (also known as the "option file") from the community editing team, WEHK (Winning Eleven Hong Kong), was used.
