= FIFA 19 =

FIFA series football simulation video game

- Cover art featuring former Real Madrid/Juventus player Cristiano Ronaldo
- Developers: EA Vancouver; EA Romania
- Publisher: EA Sports
- Composers: Hans Zimmer; Lorne Balfe
- Series: FIFA
- Engine: Frostbite 3 (PS4, XOne, PC); Impact (PS3, X360, NS)
- Platforms: Microsoft Windows; PlayStation 3; PlayStation 4; Xbox 360; Xbox One; Nintendo Switch
- Release: 28 September 2018
- Genre: Sports
- Modes: Single-player, multiplayer

FIFA 19 is a football simulation video game developed by EA Vancouver and released by Electronic Arts on 28 September 2018 for PlayStation 3, PlayStation 4, Xbox 360, Xbox One, Nintendo Switch, and Microsoft Windows. It is the 26th installment in the FIFA series.

As with FIFA 18, Cristiano Ronaldo featured as the cover athlete of the regular edition: however, following his unanticipated transfer from Real Madrid to Juventus, new cover art was released. He also appeared with Neymar on the cover of the Champions edition. In October 2018 a woman stated Ronaldo had raped her in a Las Vegas hotel room in 2009 and later filed a lawsuit in a Clark County, Nevada court, alleging Ronaldo and his team took advantage of her fragile emotional state and coerced her into signing a settlement and nondisclosure agreement in exchange for $375,000. As a result, in February 2019, EA replaced Ronaldo as the cover star with Neymar, Kevin De Bruyne and Paulo Dybala.

The game features the UEFA club competitions for the first time, including the UEFA Champions League and UEFA Europa League and the UEFA Super Cup as well. Martin Tyler and Alan Smith return as regular commentators, while the new commentary team of Derek Rae and Lee Dixon feature in the UEFA competitions mode. Composer Hans Zimmer and rapper Vince Staples recorded a new remix of the UEFA Champions League anthem specifically for the game.

The character Alex Hunter, who first appeared in FIFA 17, returns for the third and final installment of "The Journey", entitled, "The Journey: Champions". In June 2019, a free update added the 2019 FIFA Women's World Cup Final to kick-off mode.

The online servers for the game for Nintendo Switch, PlayStation 3 and Xbox 360 were shut down on 14 February 2023, whilst online servers for PC, PlayStation 4 and Xbox One were shut down on 6 November 2023.

It is the last FIFA game to be available on the Xbox 360 and PlayStation 3, and the last known game from a major studio to be physically available for the PlayStation 3 worldwide.

== Gameplay ==
Gameplay changes on FIFA 19 include the new "Active Touch System"— an overhaul of player control, "timed finishing"— where the kick button may be pressed a second time to determine the exact moment the ball is actually kicked, "50/50 battles"— a system for determining how likely a player will win loose balls, and "Dynamic Tactics"— which allows players to configure strategies, and switch between them in real-time during a match.

FIFA 19 introduces the UEFA Champions League, UEFA Europa League and UEFA Super Cup competitions to the game, after their licenses with Konami's Pro Evolution Soccer expired. After the addition of UEFA Licence Elite was added ithe FUT version of european tournaments..an example In later editions Pluisje FC the online club:

- winner of 5x in a row Elite III,
- winner of 1x Supercup,
- winner of 4x times in a row Elite II

The game will have support for promotion and relegation between the Champions League and Europa League. Martin Tyler and Alan Smith return as regular commentators with Derek Rae and Lee Dixon as Champions League commentators. Geoff Shreeves also returns as the touchline reporter as well as Alan McInally providing updates from around the league. New graphics and stadiums have been implemented.

Composer Hans Zimmer and rapper Vince Staples recorded a new remix of the UEFA Champions League anthem for FIFA 19. It can also be heard in the game's reveal trailer.

The Nintendo Switch port will receive upgrades over FIFA 18. On 9 June 2018, EA Sports uploaded an official reveal trailer on their YouTube channel. Cristiano Ronaldo returned as the global cover star for a second consecutive time. He and Neymar appear on the Champions and Ultimate Edition packs. However, Ronaldo was taken off the cover in February. Now, it features Neymar, Kevin De Bruyne and Paulo Dybala on the cover. It includes 55 national teams with 35 licensed leagues.

It was confirmed that the game would have a licensed Serie A after being called "Calcio A" (due to licensing issues) in FIFA 17 and FIFA 18. The game will include the Chinese Super League, the first FIFA title to do so. However, it was confirmed that the game will not include the Russian Premier League, as it did in FIFA 18 and previous FIFAs. Russian Premier League teams CSKA Moscow, Spartak Moscow, and Lokomotiv Moscow were kept, while Dinamo Zagreb, Dynamo Kyiv, Slavia Praha, and Viktoria Plzen were added to the game. Boca Juniors appears as Buenos Aires FC in the game since the club signed a deal with Konami; for the same reasons, Colo-Colo appears as CD Viñazur. Once again, due to Konami securing deals with certain Brazilian clubs, the Campeonato Brasileiro Série A is featured in an incomplete form, this time with only 15 clubs, with the notable omissions of São Paulo, Palmeiras, Corinthians, Flamengo and Vasco da Gama, all of which are Konami partners. The remaining Brazilian clubs, while appearing with licensed branding, do not have any of their players licensed due to an ongoing judicial dispute over image rights, which are negotiated individually with each player, unlike other countries.

As with every FIFA game, there are new skills included, with Andrés Iniesta's signature move, La Croqueta and Watford legend Luther Blissett's famous skill the Emery Spin, featuring in FIFA 19. 25 new icons have been added to the Ultimate Team in FIFA 19, including Rivaldo, Roberto Baggio, Johan Cruyff, George Best, Luís Figo, Steven Gerrard, Roy Keane, Ryan Giggs, Bobby Moore, Franco Baresi, Ruud van Nistelrooy, Eusébio, Hidetoshi Nakata, Fabio Cannavaro, Michael Ballack and Frank Lampard. New goal celebrations featured include Kylian Mbappé's 'Little Brother', Roberto Firmino's 'Matador', Mohamed Salah performing a sujud, Neymar's 'Hang Loose', while Cristiano Ronaldo and his nearest teammate both perform Ronaldo's 'Siii' jump together.

New stadiums confirmed for FIFA 19 include the new Tottenham Hotspur Stadium, Molineux Stadium, home of Wolverhampton Wanderers, Craven Cottage, home of Fulham, and the Cardiff City Stadium, home of Cardiff City and Wales national football team, ensuring all 20 English Premier League grounds are featured. There will also be 16 new stadiums from the Spanish La Liga, with 3 more from the Spanish Segunda Division. The only absent stadium from La Liga will be the Camp Nou, due to Barcelona's exclusive deal with rival game Pro Evolution Soccer 2019. The only new Major League Soccer stadium featured is the Mercedes-Benz Stadium of Atlanta United FC, joining LA Galaxy's StubHub Center and Seattle Sounders FC' CenturyLink Field.

The PlayStation 3 and Xbox 360 versions, known as FIFA 19: Legacy Edition, do not contain any new gameplay features aside from updated kits and squads.

=== Downloadable update ===
On 29 May 2019, EA announced a free update featuring content from the 2019 FIFA Women's World Cup. The DLC updates the women's teams already featured in the game and adds the remaining 10 teams that are participating in the tournament. 20 of the teams in the tournament feature licensed kits and players (Italy has unlicensed kits but correct player names, Chile and Brazil have licensed kits but generic player names, South Africa is completely unlicensed). These new teams can only be played in Kick-Off mode with the 2019 FIFA Women's World Cup Final, but not in the fictionalized International Women's Cup mode. The Kick-Off mode features a new scenario in which the player can compete in the final at the Parc Olympique Lyonnais. It is the first time that the FIFA Women's World Cup has been utilized in a video game of some form, though it debuted early in "The Journey: Champions" in Kim Hunter's story mode, with fewer women's teams as opponents along with a fictionalized arena since there was still qualifying during that time as FIFA 19 was still being developed.

== The Journey: Champions ==
The story-based mode that was introduced in FIFA 17 returns in this installment and continues for the last installment under the title "The Journey: Champions". In this installment, Alex Hunter signs for Real Madrid and tries to become their star player after Cristiano Ronaldo leaves for Italian giants Juventus. As FIFA 19 has the full Champions League licence, Hunter also competes for Champions League glory. Danny Williams returns trying to carve out a name for himself and compete for the Champions League hardware. Alex Hunter's half-sister, Kim Hunter, tries to compete for the 2019 FIFA Women's World Cup. The game mode features guest stars such as Kevin De Bruyne, Neymar and Paulo Dybala. Gareth Walker and Dino, who previously appeared in FIFA 17 and FIFA 18, do not appear in the storyline for unknown reasons, though Walker does send the characters a few abusive tweets during the story. The game also introduces other fictional new characters whose names include Beatriz "Bea" Villanova, who is Alex Hunter's new agent, Danny Williams' estranged brother and Paris Saint-Germain F.C. defender Terry, USWNT coach Marriane de Silva, Real Madrid C.F. coach Bartholomew Cazares, Danny Williams friend Ringo, and Melanie Trembley, a player of the Canada women's national team who serves as Kim Hunter's rival in her story. Also, this story mode is somehow out of order as it allows the player to choose between 3 different characters, altering between different months in the series.

=== Story ===
The story starts out with Alex Hunter, his half-sister Kim, and Danny Williams watching a video of Hunter's grandfather, Jim Hunter, scoring his 100th career goal for his club in a First Division match at Coventry City. Prior to that (as the calendar flashes back to previous months), they train with their respective teams for the pre-season friendly tournament which is being held in Japan, where in semifinals Danny faces Club América, and Alex is playing against Juventus, who has Cristiano Ronaldo and a mysterious defender (who, in twist of events, is Danny's brother Terry Williams) - ending with Alex and Danny's teams facing each other in the tournament's final (or third place match if Danny's team loses). After it, Toro says to Alex that he never received his apology. Alex either apologizes and reconciles with his former friends, with Li-Li suggesting that they go to eat some sushi, or either becomes Toro's arch-rival, with Li-Li explaining that Alex is just not hanging on with Toro, who is looking forward to face Alex in the next game. Kim Hunter trains with the USWNT and forms a partnership with Alex Morgan. Alex Hunter later meets with Beatriz Villanova, the football agent that contacted him at the end of the previous journey – promising to make Alex an icon in world football. She keeps her promise and tells Alex that Real Madrid have offered him a 5-year contract, which he accepts and heads over to Spain to his new club. Alex is yet to make his Champions League debut and gets help from various mentors in the team to help him boost his stats.

Alex and Danny play in the Champions League group stage matches. Alex's group include Tottenham Hotspur or Manchester United (Hunter faces Manchester United if his Premier League club previously is Tottenham Hotspur; Hunter faces Tottenham Hotspur if he didn't choose that club in previous games), Olympique de Marseille and Sporting CP while Danny's group involves his brother Terry's team Paris Saint-Germain (he moved there from Juventus in the transfer window), Ajax and Shakhtar Donetsk. Both Alex and Danny's teams make it out of their groups and are drawn at opposite ends of the bracket. By this point Alex has become increasingly caught up in his brand and sponsor duties from his agents demands and the increasing fame is starting to drive a wedge between his family. This is further seen when Kim comes to visit Alex before the World Cup and Alex does not go to pick her up from the airport due to him being too busy with his new clothing brand, much to both Kim and his mother's dismay. Due to this, Alex is dropped from both the starting XI and substitutes before the second-leg of the first knockout round in the Champions League against Borussia Dortmund, meaning he has to fight his way back to the starting lineup to regain his manager's trust. At the same time Danny is also having agent issues as his friend Ringo and his agent Michael which results in both agents having an argument over Danny wanting a new house or not, with the player given a choice as to which person he sides with. If Danny sides with Michael, he tells Ringo to leave, and Michael discovers that Ringo put Danny in debt, but that he can recover financially. If Danny sides with Ringo, Michael is fired, but Danny learns that Ringo put him on the verge of bankruptcy, prompting Danny to cut ties with Ringo.

Alex and Beatriz then go to visit Kim before the first Women's World Cup knockout game and Beatriz, having been impressed by Kim's abilities, tells her that she should go pro and not go to college. Back in the Champions League, Alex faces Juventus in the quarterfinal and Manchester United or Manchester City in the semifinal (Hunter only faces Manchester United if his Premier League club previously was Manchester City; Hunter faces Manchester City if he didn't choose that club in previous games) and Danny faces A.S. Roma in the round of 16, Bayern Munich in quarterfinal and once again, his brother's side PSG in the semifinal. Both defeat their rivals and progress to the Champions League Final.

Kim and the USA team reach the final of the 2019 FIFA Women's World Cup where they face up against their national rivals, Canada, led by Melanie Trembley. If USA win the final, Kim celebrates and is later implied to have signed a professional deal with a club. If the team loses the final Kim returns to college to finish her studies, but still hopes to go pro one day. In the 2019 Champions League Final at the Wanda Metropolitano in Madrid, Real Madrid face Danny's (Alex's former) Premier League side. Regardless of who wins the final, the losing character takes their defeat graciously as the other celebrates being crowned the best club team in Europe. Both Danny and Alex reconcile after the final, along with Li-Li and Toro (who was apologized earlier; if Alex was hostile, Toro leaves the pitch). The game ends with Jim telling Alex that he has never been prouder of him and that when he retires, he will be the greatest Hunter of all time, drawing Alex Hunter's journey to an end. The ending of Danny Williams story mode has either him congratulating Terry or being confronted for his loss.

== Reception ==
Reception

Aggregate score
Aggregator	Score
Metacritic	NS: 71/100; PC: 81/100; PS4: 83/100; XONE: 83/100

Review scores
Publication	Score
GameSpot	7/10
GamesRadar+	4.5/5
IGN	8.2/10
Nintendo Life	7/10
PC Gamer (US)	83/100
Push Square	8/10
The Guardian	4/5
USgamer	4/5

In the United Kingdom, FIFA 19 opened at number-one on the software sales chart, but opening-week sales were down 25% compared to FIFA 18. In Japan, FIFA 19 sold 155,641 copies.

On Metacritic, the PlayStation 4 version has an aggregate score of 83 out of 100, indicating "generally favorable reviews". GameSpot rated it 7 out of 10, with praise towards the presentation, licenses, and new modes, but criticism towards the pitch gameplay, comparing it unfavourably to PES 2019. IGN rated it 8.2 out of 10, stating that it is "an improvement on last year's effort, despite not all new additions quite hitting the mark."

=== Accolades ===
Year	Award	Category	Result	Ref.
2018	Game Critics Awards	Best Sports Game	Won	
2018	Gamescom	Best Sports Game	Won	
2018	Golden Joystick Awards	Best Competitive Game	Nominated	
2018	The Game Awards 2018	Best Sports/Racing	Nominated	
2018	Gamers' Choice Awards	Fan Favourite Sports/Racing Game	Nominated	
2018	Titanium Awards	Best Sports/Driving Game	Nominated	
2019	Writers' Guild of Great Britain Awards	Best Writing in a Video Game (The Journey: Champions)	Nominated	
2019	Guild of Music Supervisors Awards	Best Music Supervision in a Video Game	Nominated	
2019	22nd Annual D.I.C.E. Awards	Sports Game of the Year	Nominated	
2019	National Academy of Video Game Trade Reviewers Awards	Game, Franchise Sports	Nominated	
2019	National Academy of Video Game Trade Reviewers Awards	Performance in a Sports Game (Adetomiwa Edun)	Won	
2019	SXSW Gaming Awards	Excellence in Convergence	Nominated	
2019	Italian Video Game Awards	People's Choice	Nominated	
2019	Italian Video Game Awards	Best Sports Game	Nominated	
2019	Golden Joystick Awards	eSports Game of the Year	Nominated	
