= 2019 Golden Joystick Awards =

Video game awards ceremony

- Date: November 15, 2019
- Venue: Bloomsbury Big Top
- Country: United Kingdom
- Hosted by: Danny Wallace

Highlights
- Most awards: Resident Evil 2; Days Gone (2)
- Game of the Year: Resident Evil 2
- Lifetime Achievement: Yu Suzuki

The 2019 Golden Joystick Awards was the 37th edition of the Golden Joystick Awards, an annual awards event that honored the best video games of that year. The event was hosted by comedian Danny Wallace, and took place at the Bloomsbury Big Top in London on November 15, 2019.

== Awards and nominations ==
Titles in bold won their respective category.

Best Storytelling	Best Visual Design
**Days Gone**; Control; Eliza; Fire Emblem: Three Houses; Metro Exodus; Mortal Kombat 11; Observation; Outer Wilds; Sunless Skies; Telling Lies	**Devil May Cry 5**; 11-11: Memories Retold; Ape Out; Control; GRIS; Kingdom Hearts III; Metro Exodus; Outer Wilds; Sayonara Wild Hearts; Sekiro: Shadows Die Twice
Best Audio	Best Indie Game
**Resident Evil 2**; A Plague Tale: Innocence; Ape Out; Cadence of Hyrule; Control; Days Gone; Observation; Outer Wilds; Tetris Effect; The Light Keeps Us Safe	**Outer Wilds**; A Short Hike; Baba Is You; Devotion; Knights and Bikes; Observation; Sayonara Wild Hearts; Slay the Spire; Sunless Skies; Telling Lies
Best Game Expansion	Best Multiplayer Game
**GTA Online: Diamond Casino Update**; Civilization VI: Gathering Storm; Destiny 2: Shadowkeep; Final Fantasy XIV: Shadowbringers; Forza Horizon 4: LEGO Speed Champions; Monster Hunter World: Iceborne; No Man's Sky Beyond; Sea of Thieves: Anniversary Update; The Elder Scrolls Online: Elsweyr; Warframe: Empyrean	**Apex Legends**; Borderlands 3; FIFA 20; Mortal Kombat 11; Red Dead Online; Super Smash Bros. Ultimate; Tetris 99; The Dark Pictures Anthology: Man of Medan; The Division 2; eFootball PES 2020
Still Playing Award	E-Sports Game of the Year
**Minecraft**; Destiny 2; Elite Dangerous; Fortnite; GTA Online; Rocket League; The Elder Scrolls Online; Rainbow Six Siege; Warframe; World of Warcraft	**Fortnite**; Call of Duty: Black Ops 4; Counter-Strike: Global Offensive; Dota 2; FIFA 19; League of Legends; Overwatch; PUBG Mobile; Super Smash Bros. Ultimate; Rainbow Six Siege
Best Mobile Game	Best Nintendo Game
**BTS World**; Command & Conquer: Rivals; Dr. Mario World; Football Manager Touch 2019; Grindstone; Harry Potter: Wizards Unite; KIDS; The Mighty Quest for Epic Loot; Sky: Children of the Light; The Elder Scrolls: Blades	**Super Smash Bros. Ultimate**; Pokémon: Let's Go, Pikachu! and Let's Go, Eevee!; Tetris 99; Yoshi's Crafted World; Super Mario Maker 2; Astral Chain; Cadence of Hyrule; Fire Emblem: Three Houses; The Legend of Zelda: Link's Awakening; Dragon Quest Builders 2
Best PlayStation Game	Best PC Game
**Days Gone**; Blood & Truth; Concrete Genie; Dreams; Déraciné; Erica; Final Fantasy XIV: Shadowbringers; Judgement; MediEvil; Tetris Effect	**World of Warcraft: Classic**; Age of Wonders: Planetfall; Anno 1800; Dicey Dungeons; F1 2019; Heaven's Vault; Slay the Spire; Sunless Skies; Teamfight Tactics; Total War: Three Kingdoms
Best Xbox Game	Best VR/AR Game
**Gears 5**; Ashen; Below; Blair Witch; Castlevania Anniversary Collection; Crackdown 3; Outer Wilds; Void Bastards	**Beat Saber**; Ace Combat 7: Skies Unknown; Blood & Truth; Déraciné; Falcon Age; Harry Potter: Wizards Unite; Nintendo Labo VR Kit; No Man's Sky Beyond; Tetris Effect; Trover Saves the Universe
Most Wanted Game	Studio of the Year
**Cyberpunk 2077**; Animal Crossing: New Horizons; Disintegration; Doom Eternal; Dying Light 2; Elden Ring; Final Fantasy VII Remake; Halo Infinite; Hytale; Marvel's Avengers; The Last of Us Part II; Watch Dogs: Legion	**Epic Games**; 4A Games; Capcom; Digital Extremes; Hello Games; Media Molecule; Mobius Digital; Nintendo; Remedy Entertainment; Respawn Entertainment
Best New Streamer/Broadcaster	Breakthrough Award
**Ewok**	**House House**
Critics Choice Award	Lifetime Achievement Award
**Control**	**Yu Suzuki**
Best Performer	Outstanding Contribution
**Logan Marshall-Green** as David Smith (**Telling Lies**)	**Life Is Strange**
