= FIFA 16 =

2015 video game

- Global cover art featuring Barcelona's Lionel Messi
- Developer: EA Canada
- Publisher: EA Sports
- Producers: Nick Channon; Sebastian Enrique
- Series: FIFA
- Engine: Ignite (PC, PS4, XONE); Impact (PS3, X360, iOS, Android)
- Platforms: PlayStation 3 PlayStation 4 Windows; Xbox 360; Xbox One; Android iOS
- Release: NA: 22 September 2015; AU: 24 September 2015; UK: 25 September 2015
- Genre: Sports
- Modes: Single-player, multiplayer

FIFA 16 is a football simulation video game developed by EA Canada and published by Electronic Arts under the EA Sports label. It was released for Microsoft Windows, PlayStation 3, PlayStation 4, Xbox 360, Xbox One, Android, and iOS.

The game is the first in the FIFA series to include female players. It is also the first in which the players on the covers were chosen by popular vote, including one of the first three women to appear on the cover. Martin Tyler and Alan Smith are the commentators for the game.

The online servers for the game were shut down on 14 February 2023.

== Gameplay ==
The game contained 78 stadiums, including 50 real-world venues. Fratton Park, home of Portsmouth, was added to honour Portsmouth fan Simon Humber, creative director of the FIFA series, who died of cancer in 2015.

A new Training Mode was also added to Career Mode allowing the player to develop footballers in the team of which they are managing without actually playing them. These are in the form of skill games, a feature first added to the series in EA Sports' 2014 World Cup official game. It allows the player to set a specific focus on which the footballer should develop on meaning that he will grow specifically according to the chosen focus attribute. Doing this also increases the transfer value of the player.

Improvements were also made upon the FIFA Ultimate Team. Changes were made to the FIFA Ultimate Team interface, including pack management, the transfer market, squad chemistry, consumables, and swapping players. Along with these interface changes, there were substantial gameplay updates introduced, including FIFA Ultimate Team Draft, in which players are given a choice of five random players for each position, and then pitting their newly made team against others on a tournament-style format. Another addition made to the Ultimate Team game mode, for Xbox players was the expansion of FIFA Ultimate Team Legends players to include iconic and historic names such as George Best, Ryan Giggs, Deco, Vítor Baía and Alessandro Nesta.

New friendly enhancements were added to the mode with players now able to pick a friendly tournament before a season starts. Winning these friendly tournaments gives the player a reward in the form of a transfer budget boost. Also, unlimited substitutions are permitted when playing these friendly games. Other features include two-year loans, many realistic transfer budget enhancements and improved player values.

New features that was exclusive to the PlayStation 4, Xbox One and PC versions of the game involve a licensed presentation package for the Bundesliga, new weather and kick-off time variations, and the use of vanishing spray during certain matches. Downloadable content is available using a point system.

In addition to Tyler and Smith, commentary was once again provided by Alan McInally (in-game score updates), Geoff Shreeves (injury reports), and Mike West (Classified results for major leagues). Spanish and French commentary is also provided. Clive Tyldesley and Andy Townsend do not reprise their roles for international tournament play-calling, but return in FIFA 17 for World Cup and Euro Qualifier matches.

The Brasileirão wasn't included in FIFA 16 due to licensing issues. Instead, a handful of Brazilian teams were implemented into the 'Rest of World' section. New goal celebrations featured include Lionel Messi's '1, 2, 3 hat-trick' celebration – he looks into the camera while making the gesture, Tim Cahill's 'Timber', and Olivier Giroud's 'Glamour slide'.

== Development and release ==
In order to get female player motions correct, the game's designers used motion capture of American forwards Alex Morgan and Sydney Leroux, American midfielder Megan Rapinoe and Australian defender Steph Catley.

FIFA 16 was announced on 28 May 2015. The announcement of the inclusion of woman players was met with positive critical response from IGN. EA Sports' official trailer revealing the women's football feature was released on 28 May and included live and in-game footage of such players as Morgan, Leroux, Rapinoe, Abby Wambach, Hope Solo, Spain's Verónica Boquete (who had previously petitioned EA Sports through Change.org to include female players), England's Eniola Aluko and Steph Houghton, Germany's Célia Šašić, Canada's Christine Sinclair and Sweden's Kosovare Asllani.

The game was released in September 2015 worldwide for PC, PlayStation 3, PlayStation 4, Xbox 360, Xbox One, Android and iOS. A representative from publisher Electronic Arts confirmed that neither a PlayStation Vita version nor a Nintendo 3DS version of the game is in development, making FIFA 16 the first edition in the series since 2000 not to be released on Nintendo platforms.

In September 2015, due to a warning by the National Collegiate Athletic Association (NCAA), 13 women's players that are currently attending or "likely to attend" an NCAA member institution will be removed from FIFA 16. The NCAA argued that the inclusion of these particular players would result in their forfeiture of eligibility to participate in NCAA-sanctioned competition, as NCAA rules strictly restrict monetary compensation to individual student-athletes. Whilst complying with the request, EA argued that they had licensed their likenesses through national governing bodies under "standard protocol", and that "none of these NCAA student-athletes or potential student-athletes were to be individually compensated by EA Sports for their inclusion in the game."

The official soundtrack was released on 10 September 2015, and is available for streaming on Spotify.

This is the first edition of the game to include the rosters for the newly expanded MLS clubs in the U.S., New York City FC and Orlando City SC, in their respective league and conferences, rather than in the "Rest of the World" classification in FIFA 15.

In February 2016, British child protection charities lobbied for EA Sports to remove former Sunderland winger and convicted child sex offender Adam Johnson from the game. The company removed him from several modes of the game and worked to combat technical issues that were preventing his full removal.

On 14 February 2023, the online servers for the game were shut down.

== Cover athletes ==
FIFA 16 is the first game in the series to allow fans the opportunity to put their favourite from a group of nominated players alongside Lionel Messi on the cover of the game in Australia, Europe and Latin America. Steph Catley was chosen in the Australian vote, making her one of the first three women to feature on a FIFA game cover. Alex Morgan and Christine Sinclair, were chosen by EA for the US and Canada covers, respectively.

== Reception ==
Reception

Aggregate score
Aggregator	Score
Metacritic	(PS4) 82/100 (XONE) 84/100 (PC) 81/100

Review scores
Publication	Score
Eurogamer	8 / 10
Game Informer	8.75 / 10
GameSpot	9 / 10
GamesRadar+	4/5
IGN	7.8 / 10
Official Xbox Magazine (UK)	3.5/5
VideoGamer.com	7 / 10
Metro	7 / 10
The Guardian	5/5

ESPN writer James Tyler gave the game a positive review, commenting on the increased realism of defending and passing tactics. He suggested that the series could be improved with a mode playing as a team owner. The Independent's Andrew Griffin was also pleased with the additions, but theorised that they would not be revolutionary enough to challenge rival title PES 2016. Writing for The Guardian, Ben Wilson noted the difference in tactics needed while playing as women, and concluded that it would be difficult to choose the best game out of the year's FIFA and PES editions, awarding a maximum five stars.

IGN praised the addition of women's football and the FUT Draft mode, but compared the game unfavourably with PES 2016, stating that, with "its biggest rival matching its dynamism and beating it for fluidity and responsiveness, EA Sports has work to do if FIFA is to regain its title as king of the digital sport." Metro also compared it unfavourably with PES 2016, stating that it is "one of the best and most immersive editions of the FIFA franchise, despite the old school award winning competitor PES 2016" but is "still lacking the balance between authenticity and fun for the audiences". GameSpot gave it a more positive review, stating that, while it "can be stubborn and stifling", it "feels gloriously new, and having to learn fresh strategies and nuances in a game series like this is an almost-forgotten pleasure."

=== Awards ===
List of awards and nominations
Award	Category	Result	Ref.
The Game Awards 2015	Best Sports/Racing Game	Nominated	
19th Annual D.I.C.E. Awards	Sports Game of the Year	Nominated	
12th British Academy Games Awards	Sports	Nominated	
