= Mind: Path to Thalamus =

2014 video game

- Developers: Pantumaca Barcelona; Carlos Coronado; Dani Navarro; Luka Nieto
- Publisher: Talking About Media
- Engine: Unreal Engine 4
- Platforms: Windows, macOS, Linux, PlayStation 4
- Release: WW: August 5, 2014
- Mode: Single-player

Mind: Path to Thalamus is a first-person puzzle video game created by Spanish indie developer Carlos Coronado, released on August 15, 2014.

== Story ==
Mind begins with the protagonist asking himself, "How many times will I kill her?" The game then fades to Menorca, Spain, where a massive tornado approaches the town where the protagonist and his daughter, Sophia, are staying. Hinting that this is a flashback, the protagonist races to the house, calling Sophia's name, but loses consciousness when the tornado reaches the house.

The protagonist soon finds himself exploring a dream-like world, in which he solves puzzles within the environment and gives various monologues. Early on, the protagonist glimpses a massive tree, which he dubs "the Thalamus", and decides to head there, thinking he might find Sophia.

== Awards ==
Mind won "Best Independent Game" at the Fun & Serious Game Festival in 2015.
