= G-cluster =

G-cluster is a Finnish cloud gaming provider. Initially founded by Erik Piehl in 2000, it has been wholly owned by subsidiary of SoftBank since 2004. It uses IPTV set-top boxes for its service. Their target audience are console gamers.

G-cluster's business model was introduced in the article "Developing Cloud Business Models: A Case Study on Cloud Gaming" of the IEEE Software Magazine in July/August of 2011.

Some of the first implementations of cloud gaming as a gaming-on-demand technology were introduced by G-cluster. The first commercial roll-out of the service was for CYTA in 2005 on their IPTV network. In March 2008, G-cluster announced HD support in their solution with Amino IPTV STB. In November 2010, after thorough beta testing, French operator SFR launched a commercial service based on G-cluster technology. G-cluster signed content acquisition deals with game studios around the world, including Electronic Arts, Ubisoft, Sega, Gameloft, Disney, and Warner.

Between 2010 and 2016, the company received investments from the largest Telecom carriers in the world including Orange, SFR, and NTT.

In July 2016, G-cluster was acquired by the Broadmedia Corporation.

The service was shut down on February 28, 2025 on all platforms.

== See also ==
- List of cloud gaming solution providers
