= Game Critics Awards =

Video game awards held after E3

- Current: 21st Annual Game Critics Awards
- Awarded for: Best in video games
- Venue: Los Angeles, California
- Country: United States
- Hosted by: Electronic Entertainment Expo
- First award: 1998; 28 years ago
- Final award: June 13, 2019; 7 years ago
- Website: gamecriticsawards.com

The Game Critics Awards were a set of annual awards held after the E3 video game conference since 1998. The awards were given to products displayed at E3 with the title Best of E3 of their category. The 21st Annual Game Critics Awards was showcased for the final time in 2019, four years before E3 was permanently discontinued.

== Format ==
The nominees and winners of the awards were chosen by individual judges representing 35 (as of 2011) major North American media outlets. The awards were given independently of the Expo's organizers.

== Categories ==
=== Best of Show ===
- 2019: Final Fantasy VII Remake (for PlayStation 4)
- 2018: Resident Evil 2 (for PC, PlayStation 4 and Xbox One)
- 2017: Super Mario Odyssey (for Switch)
- 2016: The Legend of Zelda: Breath of the Wild (for Wii U and Switch)
- 2015: Fallout 4 (for PC, PlayStation 4 and Xbox One)
- 2014: Evolve (for PC, PlayStation 4, and Xbox One)
- 2013: Titanfall (for PC, Xbox 360 and Xbox One)
- 2012: The Last of Us (for PlayStation 3)
- 2011: BioShock Infinite (for PC, PlayStation 3, Xbox 360)
- 2010: Nintendo 3DS
- 2009: Uncharted 2: Among Thieves (for PlayStation 3)
- 2008: Fallout 3 (for PC, PlayStation 3, and Xbox 360)
- 2007: Rock Band (for PlayStation 3 and Xbox 360)
- 2006: Wii
- 2005: Spore (for PC and Mac)
- 2004: PlayStation Portable
- 2003: Half-Life 2 (for PC)
- 2002: Doom 3 (for PC)
- 2001: GameCube
- 2000: Black & White (for PC)
- 1999: Freelancer (for PC)

=== Best Original Game ===
- 2019: The Outer Worlds (for PC, PlayStation 4, and Xbox One)
- 2018: Dreams (for PlayStation 4)
- 2017: Mario + Rabbids Kingdom Battle (for Switch)
- 2016: Horizon Zero Dawn (for PlayStation 4)
- 2015: Horizon Zero Dawn (for PlayStation 4)
- 2014: No Man's Sky (for PlayStation 4)
- 2013: Titanfall (for PC, Xbox 360, and Xbox One)
- 2012: The Last of Us (for PlayStation 3)
- 2011: BioShock Infinite (for PC, PlayStation 3, and Xbox 360)
- 2010: Dance Central (for Xbox 360)
- 2009: Scribblenauts (for Nintendo DS)
- 2008: Mirror's Edge (for PC, PlayStation 3, and Xbox 360)
- 2007: LittleBigPlanet (for PlayStation 3)
- 2006: Spore (for PC)
- 2005: Spore (for PC)
- 2004: Donkey Kong Jungle Beat (for GameCube)
- 2003: Full Spectrum Warrior (for PC and Xbox)
- 2002: Psychonauts (for Xbox)
- 2001: Majestic (for PC)
- 2000: Black & White (for PC)
- 1999: Black & White (for PC)

=== Best Console Game ===
- 2019: Final Fantasy VII Remake (for PlayStation 4)
- 2018: Spider-Man (for PlayStation 4)
- 2017: Super Mario Odyssey (for Switch)
- 2016: The Legend of Zelda: Breath of the Wild (for Wii U and Switch)
- 2015: Uncharted 4: A Thief's End (for PlayStation 4)
- 2014: Evolve (for PC, PlayStation 4, and Xbox One)
- 2013: Titanfall (for Xbox 360 and Xbox One)
- 2012: The Last of Us (for PlayStation 3)
- 2011: The Elder Scrolls V: Skyrim (for PlayStation 3, Xbox 360, and PC)
- 2010: Rage (for PlayStation 3 and Xbox 360)
- 2009: Uncharted 2: Among Thieves (for PlayStation 3)
- 2008: LittleBigPlanet (for PlayStation 3)
- 2007: Mass Effect (for Xbox 360)
- 2006: Gears of War (for Xbox 360)
- 2005: The Legend of Zelda: Twilight Princess (for GameCube)
- 2004: Halo 2 (for Xbox)
- 2003: Halo 2 (for Xbox)
- 2002: The Legend of Zelda: The Wind Waker (for GameCube)
- 2001: Metal Gear Solid 2: Sons of Liberty (for PlayStation 2)
- 2000: Jet Grind Radio (for Dreamcast)
- 1999: Perfect Dark (for Nintendo 64)
- 1998: Metal Gear Solid (for PlayStation)

=== Best PC Game ===
- 2019: Doom Eternal
- 2018: Anthem
- 2017: Destiny 2
- 2016: Civilization VI
- 2015: Fallout 4
- 2014: Tom Clancy's Rainbow Six Siege
- 2013: Titanfall
- 2012: XCOM: Enemy Unknown
- 2011: BioShock Infinite
- 2010: Portal 2
- 2009: Star Wars: The Old Republic
- 2008: Spore
- 2007: Crysis
- 2006: Spore
- 2005: Spore
- 2004: Tom Clancy's Splinter Cell: Chaos Theory
- 2003: Half-Life 2
- 2002: Doom 3
- 2001: Star Wars Galaxies
- 2000: Black & White
- 1999: Freelancer
- 1998: Half-Life

=== Best Handheld Game ===
- 2017: Metroid: Samus Returns (for Nintendo 3DS)
- 2015: The Legend of Zelda: Tri Force Heroes (for Nintendo 3DS)
- 2014: Super Smash Bros. for Nintendo 3DS (for Nintendo 3DS)
- 2013: Tearaway (for PlayStation Vita)
- 2012: Sound Shapes (for PlayStation Vita)
- 2011: Sound Shapes (for PlayStation Vita)
- 2010: God of War: Ghost of Sparta (for PlayStation Portable)
- 2009: Scribblenauts (for Nintendo DS)
- 2008: Resistance: Retribution (for PlayStation Portable)
- 2007: The Legend of Zelda: Phantom Hourglass (for Nintendo DS)
- 2006: The Legend of Zelda: Phantom Hourglass (for Nintendo DS)
- 2005: Nintendogs (for Nintendo DS)

=== Best Peripheral/Hardware ===
- 2019: Xbox Elite Wireless Controller Series 2
- 2018: Xbox Adaptive Controller
- 2017: Xbox One X
- 2016: PlayStation VR
- 2015: Oculus Touch
- 2014: Oculus Rift
- 2013: Oculus Rift
- 2012: Wii U
- 2011: PlayStation Vita
- 2010: Nintendo 3DS
- 2009: Project Natal (for Xbox 360)
- 2008: Rock Band 2 Ion "Drum Rocker" Set
- 2007: Rock Band instruments
- 2006: Wii
- 2005: PlayStation 3
- 2004: PlayStation Portable
- 2003: EyeToy (for PlayStation 2)
- 2002: WaveBird Wireless Controller (for GameCube)
- 2001: (PC) Nvidia GeForce 3
- 2001: (Console) GameCube
- 2000: (PC) nVidia GeForce 2
- 2000: (Console) Xbox
- 1999: (PC) Nvidia RIVA TNT2
- 1999: (Console) Dreamcast
- 1998: Microsoft SideWinder Freestyle Pro

=== Best Action Game ===
- 2019: Doom Eternal (for PC, PlayStation 4, Stadia, and Xbox One)
- 2018: Anthem (for PC, PlayStation 4 and Xbox One)
- 2017: Wolfenstein II: The New Colossus (for PC, PlayStation 4, and Xbox One)
- 2016: Battlefield 1 (for PC, PlayStation 4, and Xbox One)
- 2015: Star Wars Battlefront (for PC, PlayStation 4, and Xbox One)
- 2014: Evolve (for PC, PlayStation 4, and Xbox One)
- 2013: Titanfall (for PC, Xbox 360, and Xbox One)
- 2012: Halo 4 (for Xbox 360)
- 2011: Battlefield 3 (for PC)
- 2010: Rage (for PC, PlayStation 3, and Xbox 360)
- 2009: Call of Duty: Modern Warfare 2 (for PC, PlayStation 3, and Xbox 360)
- 2008: Gears of War 2 (for Xbox 360)
- 2007: Call of Duty 4: Modern Warfare (for PC, PlayStation 3, and Xbox 360)
- 2006: Gears of War (for Xbox 360)
- 2005: F.E.A.R. (for PC)
- 2004: Halo 2 (for Xbox)
- 2003: Half-Life 2 (for PC)
- 2002: Doom 3 (for PC)
- 2001: Star Wars Rogue Squadron II: Rogue Leader (for GameCube)
- 2000: Halo: Combat Evolved (for PC)
- 1999: Team Fortress 2 (for PC)
- 1998: Half-Life (for PC)

=== Best Action/Adventure Game ===
- 2019: Watch Dogs: Legion (for PC, PlayStation 4, Stadia, and Xbox One)
- 2018: Spider-Man (for PlayStation 4)
- 2017: Super Mario Odyssey (for Switch)
- 2016: The Legend of Zelda: Breath of the Wild (for Wii U and Switch)
- 2015: Uncharted 4: A Thief's End (for PlayStation 4)
- 2014: Batman: Arkham Knight (for PC, PlayStation 4, and Xbox One)
- 2013: Watch Dogs (for PC, PlayStation 3, PlayStation 4, Xbox 360, Xbox One, and Wii U)
- 2012: The Last of Us (for PlayStation 3)
- 2011: BioShock Infinite (for PC, PlayStation 3, and Xbox 360)
- 2010: Portal 2 (for PC, PlayStation 3, and Xbox 360)
- 2009: Uncharted 2: Among Thieves (for PlayStation 3)
- 2008: Dead Space (for PC, PlayStation 3, and Xbox 360)
- 2007: BioShock (for Xbox 360)
- 2006: Assassin’s Creed (for PlayStation 3 and Xbox 360)
- 2005: The Legend of Zelda: Twilight Princess (for GameCube)
- 2004: Tom Clancy's Splinter Cell: Chaos Theory (for PC)
- 2003: Prince of Persia: The Sands of Time (for multiple systems)
- 2002: Tom Clancy’s Splinter Cell (for multiple systems)
- 2001: Metal Gear Solid 2: Sons of Liberty (for PlayStation 2)
- 2000: Escape from Monkey Island (for PC)
- 1999: Oni (for PC)
- 1998: Grim Fandango (for PC)

=== Best Role Playing Game ===
- 2019: Final Fantasy VII Remake (for PlayStation 4)
- 2018: Kingdom Hearts III (for PlayStation 4 and Xbox One)
- 2017: Ni no Kuni II: Revenant Kingdom (for PC and PlayStation 4)
- 2016: Final Fantasy XV (for PlayStation 4 and Xbox One)
- 2015: Fallout 4 (for PC, PlayStation 4, and Xbox One)
- 2014: Dragon Age: Inquisition (for PC, PlayStation 3, PlayStation 4, Xbox 360, and Xbox One)
- 2013: The Elder Scrolls Online (for PC, PlayStation 4, and Xbox One)
- 2012: South Park: The Stick of Truth (for PC, PlayStation 3, and Xbox 360)
- 2011: The Elder Scrolls V: Skyrim (for PC, PlayStation 3, and Xbox 360)
- 2010: Star Wars: The Old Republic (for PC)
- 2009: Mass Effect 2 (for PC and Xbox 360)
- 2008: Fallout 3 (for PC, PlayStation 3, and Xbox 360)
- 2007: Mass Effect (for Xbox 360)
- 2006: Mass Effect (for Xbox 360)
- 2005: The Elder Scrolls IV: Oblivion (for PC and Xbox 360)
- 2004: Jade Empire (for Xbox)
- 2003: Fable (for Xbox)
- 2002: Neverwinter Nights (for PC)
- 2001: Neverwinter Nights (for PC)
- 2000: Neverwinter Nights (for PC)
- 1999: Vampire: The Masquerade – Redemption (for PC)
- 1998: Baldur's Gate (for PC)

=== Best Racing Game ===
- 2019: Crash Team Racing (for PlayStation 4, Nintendo Switch and Xbox One)
- 2018: Forza Horizon 4 (for PC and Xbox One)
- 2017: Forza Motorsport 7 (for PC and Xbox One)
- 2016: Forza Horizon 3 (for PC and Xbox One)
- 2015: Need for Speed (for PC, PlayStation 4, and Xbox One)
- 2014: The Crew (for PC, PlayStation 4, Xbox One, and Xbox 360)
- 2013: Need for Speed Rivals (for PC, PlayStation 3, PlayStation 4, Xbox 360, and Xbox)
- 2012: Need for Speed: Most Wanted (for PC, PlayStation 3, and Xbox 360)
- 2011: Forza Motorsport 4 (for Xbox 360)
- 2010: Need for Speed: Hot Pursuit (for PC, PlayStation 3, and Xbox 360)
- 2009: Split/Second (for PC, PlayStation 3, and Xbox 360)
- 2008: Pure (for PC, PlayStation 3, and Xbox 360)
- 2007: Burnout Paradise (for PlayStation 3 and Xbox 360)
- 2006: Excite Truck (for Wii)
- 2005: Burnout Revenge (for PlayStation 2 and Xbox)
- 2004: Burnout 3: Takedown (for PlayStation 2 and Xbox)
- 2003: Gran Turismo 4 (for PlayStation 2)
- 2002: Auto Modellista (for PlayStation 2)
- 2001: Gran Turismo 3: A-Spec (for PlayStation 2)
- 2000: Need For Speed: Motor City (for PC)
- 1999: Driver (for PC and PlayStation)
- 1998: Need for Speed III: Hot Pursuit (for PC and PlayStation)

=== Best Sports Game ===
- 2019: eFootball Pro Evolution Soccer 2020 (for PlayStation 4 and Xbox One)
- 2018: FIFA 19 (for PlayStation 4 and Xbox One)
- 2017: FIFA 18 (for PC, PlayStation 3, PlayStation 4, Xbox 360, and Xbox One)
- 2016: Steep (for PC, PlayStation 4, and Xbox One)
- 2015: FIFA 16 (for PC, PlayStation 4, PlayStation 3, Xbox One, Xbox 360, iOS, and Android)
- 2014: NHL 15 (for PlayStation 3, PlayStation 4, Xbox 360, and Xbox One)
- 2013: NHL 14 (for PlayStation 3 and Xbox 360)
- 2012: FIFA Soccer 13 (for PC, PlayStation 3, and Xbox 360)
- 2011: FIFA Soccer 12 (for PC, PlayStation 3, and Xbox 360)
- 2010: NBA Jam (for Wii)
- 2009: Fight Night Round 4 (for PlayStation 3 and Xbox 360)
- 2008: Madden NFL 09 (for multiple systems)
- 2007: Madden NFL 08 (for multiple systems)
- 2006: Wii Sports (for Wii)
- 2005: Madden NFL 06 (for multiple systems)
- 2004: Madden NFL 2005 (for multiple systems)
- 2003: Tony Hawk's Underground (for multiple systems)
- 2002: NFL 2K3 (for GameCube, PlayStation 2, and Xbox)
- 2001: Tony Hawk's Pro Skater 3 (for PlayStation 2)
- 2000: Madden NFL 2001 (for PlayStation 2)
- 1999: NFL 2K (for Dreamcast)
- 1998: Madden NFL 99 (for PC, Nintendo 64, and PlayStation)

=== Best Fighting Game ===
- 2018: Super Smash Bros. Ultimate (for Switch)
- 2017: Dragon Ball FighterZ (for PC, PlayStation 4, and Xbox One)
- 2016: Injustice 2 (for PC, PlayStation 4, and Xbox One)
- 2014: Super Smash Bros. for Wii U (for Wii U)
- 2012: Injustice: Gods Among Us (for PC, PlayStation 3, Xbox 360, and Wii U)
- 2011: Street Fighter X Tekken (for PlayStation 3, Xbox 360, and PlayStation Vita)
- 2010: Marvel vs. Capcom 3: Fate of Two Worlds (for PlayStation 3 and Xbox 360)
- 2009: Tatsunoko vs. Capcom: Ultimate All-Stars (for Wii)
- 2008: Street Fighter IV (for Arcade)
- 2007: Virtua Fighter 5 (for PlayStation 3)
- 2006: Heavenly Sword (for PlayStation 3)
- 2005: Soulcalibur III (for PlayStation 2)
- 2004: Def Jam: Fight for NY (for multiple systems)
- 2003: Soulcalibur II (for multiple systems)
- 2002: Tekken 4 (for PlayStation 2)
- 2001: Super Smash Bros. Melee (for GameCube)
- 2000: Ultimate Fighting Championship (for Dreamcast)
- 1999: Soulcalibur (for Dreamcast)
- 1998: Tekken 3

=== Best Strategy Game ===
(Real-Time or Turn-Based)

- 2019: John Wick Hex (for Mac and PC)
- 2018: Total War: Three Kingdoms (for PC)
- 2017: Mario + Rabbids Kingdom Battle (for Switch)
- 2016: Civilization VI (for PC)
- 2014: Civilization: Beyond Earth (for PC)
- 2013: Total War: Rome II (for PC)
- 2012: XCOM: Enemy Unknown (for PC, PlayStation 3, and Xbox 360)
- 2011: From Dust (for PC, PlayStation 3, and Xbox 360)
- 2010: Civilization V (for PC)
- 2009: Supreme Commander 2 (for PC and Xbox 360)
- 2008: Tom Clancy's EndWar (for PlayStation 3 and Xbox 360)
- 2007: World in Conflict (for PC)
- 2006: Supreme Commander (for PC)
- 2005: Company of Heroes (for PC)
- 2004: The Lord of the Rings: The Battle for Middle-earth (for PC)
- 2003: Command & Conquer: Generals (for PC)
- 2002: Rome: Total War (for PC)
- 2001: Age of Mythology (for PC)
- 2000: Black & White (for PC)
- 1999: Homeworld (for PC)
- 1998: (RTS) Homeworld
- 1998: (turn-based) Sid Meier's Alpha Centauri

=== Best Social/Casual/Puzzle/Family Game ===
- 2019: Luigi's Mansion 3 (for Switch)
- 2018: Overcooked 2 (for PlayStation 4, Switch and Xbox One)
- 2017: Hidden Agenda (for PlayStation 4)
- 2016: Skylanders: Imaginators (for PC, PlayStation 3, PlayStation 4, Xbox 360, Xbox One, and Wii U)
- 2015: Super Mario Maker (for Wii U)
- 2014: Mario Maker (for Wii U)
- 2013: Fantasia: Music Evolved (for Xbox 360 and Xbox One)
- 2012: Dance Central 3 (for Xbox 360)
- 2011: Sound Shapes (for PlayStation Vita)
- 2010: Rock Band 3 (for PlayStation 3, Xbox 360, and Wii)
- 2009: DJ Hero (for PlayStation 3, Xbox 360, and Wii)
- 2008: LittleBigPlanet (for PlayStation 3)
- 2007: Rock Band (for PlayStation 3 and Xbox 360)
- 2006: Guitar Hero II (for PlayStation 2)
- 2005: We Love Katamari (for PlayStation 2)
- 2004: Donkey Kong Jungle Beat (for GameCube)
- 2003: The EyeToy Games (for PlayStation 2)
- 2002: Super Monkey Ball 2 (for GameCube)
- 2001: Pikmin (for GameCube)
- 2000: Samba de Amigo (for Dreamcast)
- 1999: Um Jammer Lammy (for PlayStation)
- 1998: Sentinel Returns

=== Best Online Multiplayer ===
- 2019: Call of Duty: Modern Warfare (for PC, PlayStation 4, and Xbox One)
- 2018: Battlefield V (for PC, PlayStation 4 and Xbox One)
- 2017: Star Wars Battlefront II (for PC, PlayStation 4, and Xbox One)
- 2016: Titanfall 2 (for PC, PlayStation 4, and Xbox One)
- 2015: Star Wars Battlefront (for PC, PlayStation 4, and Xbox One)
- 2014: Evolve (for PC, PlayStation 4, and Xbox One)
- 2013: Titanfall (for PC, Xbox 360 and Xbox One)
- 2012: Halo 4 (for Xbox 360)
- 2011: Battlefield 3 (for PC, PlayStation 3, and Xbox 360)
- 2010: Assassin's Creed: Brotherhood (for PlayStation 3 and Xbox 360)
- 2009: Left 4 Dead 2 (for PC and Xbox 360)
- 2008: Left 4 Dead (for PC and Xbox 360)
- 2007: Halo 3 (for Xbox 360)
- 2006: Enemy Territory: Quake Wars (for PC)
- 2005: Battlefield 2 (for PC)
- 2004: Halo 2 (for Xbox)
- 2003: City of Heroes (for PC)
- 2002: Star Wars Galaxies (for PC) [2]
- 2001: Star Wars Galaxies (for PC) [1]
- 2000: Neverwinter Nights (for PC)
- 1999: Team Fortress 2 (for PC)
- 1998: EverQuest

=== Best Independent Game ===
- 2019: 12 Minutes (for PC and Xbox One)
- 2018: Ori and the Will of the Wisps (for PC and Xbox One)
- 2017: The Artful Escape (for PC and Xbox One)
- 2016: Inside (for PC and Xbox One)
- 2015: No Man's Sky (for PlayStation 4)
- 2014: No Man's Sky (for PlayStation 4)

=== Best VR/AR Game ===
- 2019: Phantom: Covert Ops (for Oculus Quest and PC)
- 2018: Tetris Effect (for PlayStation 4)
- 2017: Lone Echo (for PC)
- 2016: Batman: Arkham VR (for PlayStation 4)

=== Best Ongoing Game ===
- 2019: Destiny 2 (for PC, PlayStation 4, Stadia, and Xbox One)
- 2018: Fortnite (for iOS, Mac, PC, PlayStation 4, Switch and Xbox One)

=== Special Commendation for Graphics, Sound or Innovation ===
- 2019: (G) Cyberpunk 2077 (for PC, PlayStation 4, and Xbox One)
- 2018: (G) Cyberpunk 2077 (for PC, PlayStation 4, and Xbox One)
- 2018: (G) The Last of Us Part II (for PlayStation 4)
- 2018: (G) Ghost of Tsushima (for PlayStation 4)
- 2018: (S) The Last of Us Part II (for PlayStation 4)
- 2018: (I) Cyberpunk 2077 (for PC, PlayStation 4, and Xbox One)
- 2016: (G) God of War (for PlayStation 4)
- 2015: (G) Uncharted 4: A Thief's End (for PlayStation 4)
- 2014: (I) No Man's Sky (for PlayStation 4)
- 2012: (G) Star Wars 1313 (for TBA)
- 2012: (G) Watch Dogs (for PC, PlayStation 3, and Xbox 360)
- 2012: (S) The Last of Us (for PlayStation 3)
- 2012: (I) Watch Dogs (for PC, PlayStation 3, and Xbox 360)
- 2010: (G) Rage (for PC, PlayStation 3, and Xbox 360)
- 2007: (G) Killzone 2 (for PlayStation 3)
- 2005: (G) Killzone (for PlayStation 3)
- 2004: (G) Tom Clancy's Splinter Cell: Chaos Theory (for PC)
- 2003: (G) Half-Life 2 (for PC)
- 2002: (S) Doom 3 (for PC)
- 2001: (S) Medal of Honor: Allied Assault (for PC)
- 2000: (G) Metal Gear Solid 2: Sons of Liberty (for PlayStation and GameCube)
- 1999: (G) Freelancer (for PC)
- 1999: (+S) Outcast (for PC)
- 1999: (+S) Um Jammer Lammy (for PlayStation)

== Discontinued categories ==
=== Best Downloadable Game ===
- 2013: Transistor (for PC and PlayStation 4)
- 2012: The Unfinished Swan (for PlayStation 3)
- 2011: Bastion (for PC and Xbox 360)

=== Best Motion Simulation Game ===
- 2012: Dance Central 3 (for Xbox 360)
- 2011: The Legend of Zelda: Skyward Sword (for Wii)
- 2010: Dance Central (for Xbox 360)

=== Best Simulation Game ===
(Combat, Flight, Non-Combat)

- 2008: Tom Clancy's EndWar (for PlayStation 3 and Xbox 360)
- 2006: Spore (for PC)
- 2005: Spore (for PC)
- 2004: The Sims 2 (for PC)
- 2003: Full Spectrum Warrior (for PC and Xbox)
- 2002: The Sims Online (for PC)
- 2001: The Sims Online (for PC)
- 2000: MechWarrior 4: Vengeance (for PC)
- 1999: (|F) Jane's USAF (for PC)
- 1999: (|N) Freelancer (for PC)
- 1998: (|C) Fighter Legends (for PC)
- 1998: (|N) Railroad Tycoon II (for PC)

=== Best Platformer ===
- 1999: Donkey Kong 64 (for Nintendo 64)

=== Most Promising New Game ===
- 1998: Homeworld

=== Best Booth ===
- 1999: Electronic Arts

=== Best Party ===
- 1998 : Babylon 5
