= FIFA 17 =

2016 video game

- Cover art featuring Borussia Dortmund's Marco Reus
- Developers: EA Vancouver; EA Romania
- Publisher: EA Sports
- Producers: Aaron McHardy; Nick Channon
- Designer: Matthew Prior
- Composer: Atticus Ross
- Series: FIFA
- Engine: Frostbite 3 (eighth gen & PC); Impact (seventh gen)
- Platforms: Microsoft Windows; PlayStation 3 PlayStation 4 Xbox 360; Xbox One
- Release: NA: 27 September 2016; WW: 29 September 2016
- Genre: Sports
- Modes: Single-player, multiplayer

FIFA 17 is a football simulation video game developed and published by Electronic Arts under the EA Sports label. It was released in September 2016 for Microsoft Windows, PlayStation 3, PlayStation 4, Xbox 360, and Xbox One. This is the first FIFA game in the series to use the Frostbite game engine. Borussia Dortmund player Marco Reus serves as the cover athlete on the game. The online servers for the game were shut down on 14 February 2023.

== Gameplay ==
The new features in FIFA 17 include new attacking techniques, physical player overhaul, active intelligence system and set piece rewrite. EA also announced at Gamescom 2016 that Squad Building Challenges and FUT Champions will be in FIFA Ultimate Team, but not in the Xbox 360 and PlayStation 3 editions of the game.

Commentary is once again provided by Martin Tyler and Alan Smith with Alan McInally (in-game score updates), Geoff Shreeves (injury reports), and Mike West (classified results for major leagues). Commentary in other languages (such as Spanish and French) is also provided.

EA Sports announced at E3 2016 that they will have all 20 Premier League managers' likenesses in the game. New goal celebrations, such as Paul Pogba's 'Dab' and Mesut Özil's 'M' celebration, feature in the game.

On 23 June 2016, EA Sports announced that the J1 League and J.League Cup will be featured in the game for the first time, with Gamba Osaka's stadium, Suita City Football Stadium will be added as well. On 4 September 2016, EA Sports announced at Brasil Game Show 2016 that 18 Campeonato Brasileiro Série A teams will be featured in their respective league (Corinthians and Flamengo, who signed an exclusivity deal with Konami for Pro Evolution Soccer, do not appear). Five Série B teams are also in the game. The Brazilian teams in the game have generic player names which the user cannot change. Women's teams, who were introduced in FIFA 16, also return, with the Norway women's national football team being added to the series but they removed stadium Camp Nou and added El Libertador in FIFA 17 (due to Barcelona's exclusive deal with PES 2017).

== The Journey ==
FIFA 17 introduced a new single-player story campaign mode, "The Journey", for PS4, Xbox One and Windows. Players assume the role of Alex Hunter (voiced and modeled by Adetomiwa Edun), a young footballer trying to make his mark in the Premier League. The player is able to select any Premier League club to play for at the beginning of the season. The player can only play in an upfield position as a right winger, striker, left winger, or central attacking midfielder. The story mode also features a dialogue wheel, similar to the Mass Effect series. The game even has a few cameos from other footballers such as James Rodriguez, Marco Reus, and Harry Kane.

=== Story ===
Alex Hunter is a 17-year-old male from Clapham, London. Hunter's grandfather is former English striker Jim Hunter, who scored 22 goals in the 1968–69 season. Under his grandfather's guidance, Hunter's life goal is to play as a footballer in the Premier League. During the finals of the 2009 youth football tournament between two young teams, one of which features Hunter and his best friend, Gareth Walker, after a penalty shoot-out in which either Hunter or Walker scores the winning penalty kick and the championship, a scout remarks about Alex Hunter's talent to Jim Hunter. Seven years later, Alex Hunter and Gareth Walker take on the exit trial which can be failed depending on how Alex Hunter performs. If the player fails they will have to redo the exit trial. If they succeed then Hunter signs for a Premier League club. Hunter soon learns that Walker has joined the same club.

Both players attend the club's pre-season tour of the United States, where they play against Real Madrid, Borussia Dortmund and Paris Saint-Germain. In the regular season, after starting most games as a substitute, Alex Hunter is loaned out to one of Newcastle United, Aston Villa, or Norwich City as a result of the major signing of either Harry Kane or Ángel Di María by Alex's parent club. When Hunter gets loaned out he is reunited with Danny Williams who also participated in the exit trial despite already being offered a pro contract. The two get close in Hunter's loan spell and quickly become close friends. When Hunter is recalled by his parent club he immediately finds out that Gareth Walker is heading to their rivals.

After returning from loan, Hunter is able to receive sponsorship deals from Adidas, each deal being received whenever Hunter hits a milestone number of followers in the Twitter-based social media menu of the game mode. The deals include new boots, a photoshoot, and the chance to appear in an Adidas advertisement alongside Di María. After a successful season in the starting eleven, Hunter gets to start in the final of the FA Cup, in which he faces Gareth Walker for the second time since his departure from the club. Before the game, Hunter and Walker encounter in the tunnel. Regardless of the result, Walker and Hunter shake hands after the game and they become reconciled. Later, in Hunter's flat, Hunter discovers that he has been named to the list of likely players to be called up to the England national team.

== Production ==
=== Demo ===
The first demo of the game came out on 13 September 2016. It included eleven teams: Chelsea, Manchester City, Manchester United, Barcelona, Real Madrid, Paris Saint-Germain, Lyon, Inter Milan, Juventus, Bayern Munich, and Gamba Osaka.

=== Cover athletes ===
Marco Reus, Eden Hazard, James Rodríguez and Anthony Martial were announced as the official ambassadors of the game. After a global cover vote conducted by EA Sports, Reus emerged as the winner.

== Reception ==
Reception

Aggregate score
Aggregator	Score
Metacritic	(PS4) 85/100 (XONE) 84/100 (PC) 84/100

Review scores
Publication	Score
Eurogamer	8/10
Game Informer	8.75/10
GameSpot	9/10
GamesRadar+	4/5
IGN	8.4/10
Official Xbox Magazine (UK)	4.5/5
VideoGamer.com	8/10
Metro	7/10
The Guardian	4/5

The game received positive reviews upon release, with gameplay, the Frostbite engine, sound, and presentation all critically acclaimed. FIFA 17 has been the fastest selling edition of the franchise.

During the 20th Annual D.I.C.E. Awards, the Academy of Interactive Arts & Sciences nominated FIFA 17 for "Sports Game of the Year".
