= Geoff Shreeves =

British football commentator

Geoff Shreeves (born October 1964) is a British journalist. He is best known for his work with Sky Sports which he joined in 1992, during the inaugural Premier League season. In 2023 after 32 years he left Sky and joined CBS Sports.

== Career ==
Shreeves went to Verulam School in St Albans, England. His media career began in the United States in 1990, when Mick Luckhurst, a former National Football League player for the Atlanta Falcons, required a researcher for his role as presenter on TNT for the 1990 FIFA World Cup. He began working for Sky Sports at the beginning of their coverage of the newly formed Premier League.

He made his reporting debut in 1999 alongside Clare Tomlinson, and now reports on the touch-line in Premier League matches on Sky Sports. He also reports for Fox Sports before Champions League games, and was a regular presenter for The Debate on Sky Sports before the show was discontinued in 2020.

He appears in the FIFA video game franchise, providing injury updates during played matches. Shreeves produced Football Godfathers for the Sky History channel where he interviewed Sven-Göran Eriksson, Louis Van Gaal, Roy Hodgson, Claudio Ranieri and Gerard Houllier.

After working for Sky sports for 32 years, he joined CBS Sports.
