= Fun & Serious Game Festival =

Annual video game festival in Bilbao, Spain

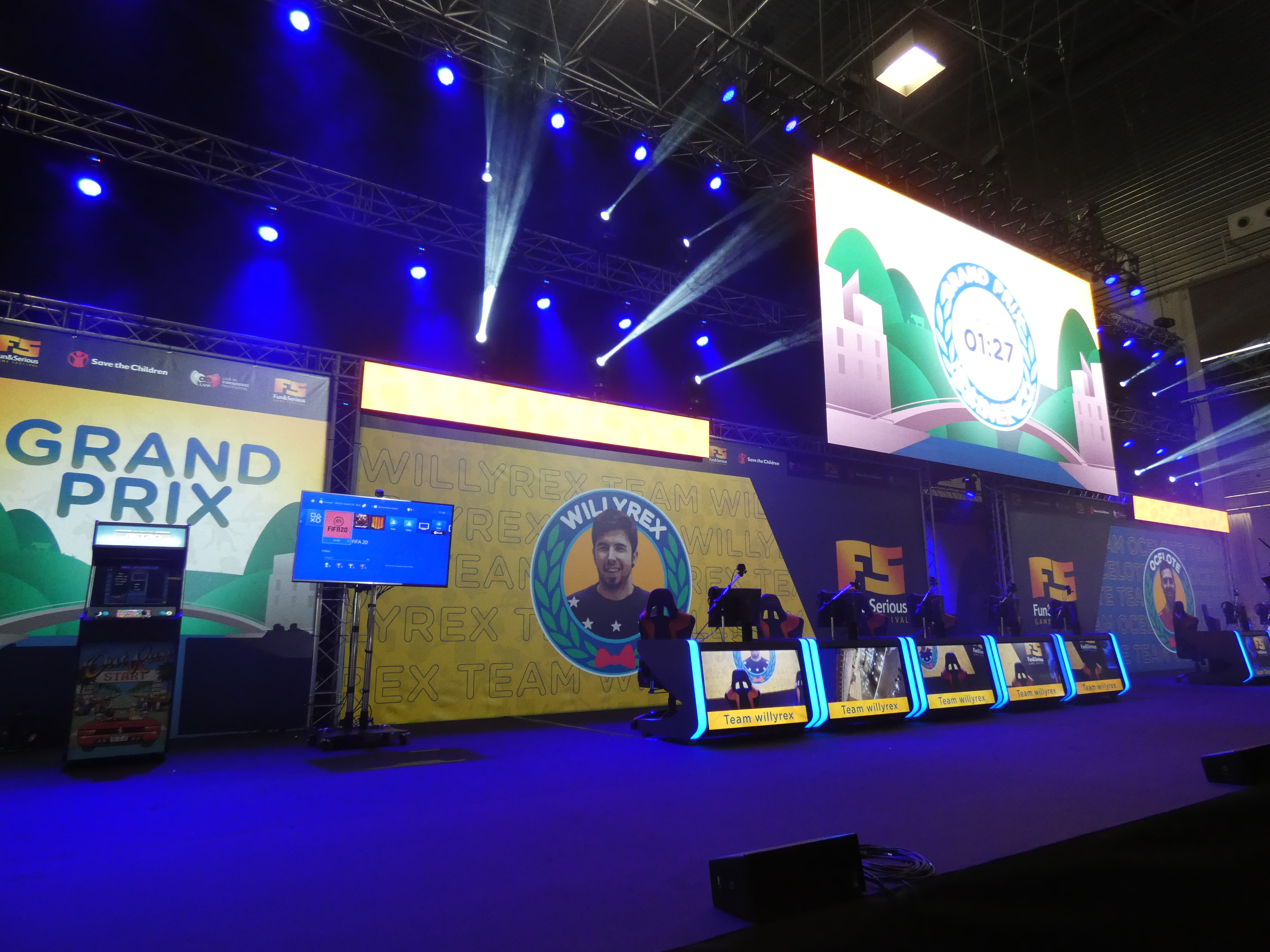
- Fun & Serious Game Festival in 2019
- Formation: 2011
- Type: Video games convention
- Location: Bilbao, Spain
- Key people: Alfonso Gómez Aguirre (Director)
- Website: www.bilbaogamesconference.com

Fun & Serious Game Festival is a video game festival that takes place, in Bilbao, Spain, from late November to the beginning of December since its foundation in 2011. Its main objective is to recognize the cultural importance of video games. To do so, several leisure and training activities are celebrated, such as the VIT Talks and the Fun & Serious Awards.

== History ==
The Fun & Serious Game Festival was founded in 2011. It has the support of the Basque Regional Government - SPRI, the city hall of Bilbao and Vizcaya's Provincial Council. Besides, it is sponsored by the newspaper 'El Correo'. Among the strategic partners of this event relevant brands from the sector can be found, such as Microsoft, PlayStation and Ubisoft. The Spanish Association of video games (AEVI) also collaborates with the Festival.

The Titanium Awards honoring the year's contributions to the video game industry conclude the festival. The Titanium Award changed its name and design in 2015, in reference to the titanium, a metal that represents the transition experimented in the city of Bilbao. In 2016, the total number of assistants was of 25000 people.

In 2018, by its eighth edition, the festival changed its location, moving to the Bilbao Exhibition Centre of Baracaldo, in order to increase the habitual capacity. In 2019 the IX edition will take place, between the 6th and 9 December, where Yōko Shimomura will be awarded with the Titanium award for her input in the video games' music world. Furthermore, the compositor will impart a talk in the VIT Talks of this festival.

== Ceremonies ==
Year	Date	Game of the Year	Venue
2011	November 8	Battlefield 3 (European)	Campos Eliseos Theater
2011	November 8	Uncharted 3: Drake's Deception (Non-European)	Campos Eliseos Theater
2012	November 29	Halo 4	Campos Eliseos Theater
2013	November 28	Grand Theft Auto V	Campos Eliseos Theater
2014	December 3	Middle-earth: Shadow of Mordor	Campos Eliseos Theater
2015	December 1	The Witcher 3: Wild Hunt	Campos Eliseos Theater
2016	November 28	Uncharted 4: A Thief's End	Guggenheim Museum
2017	December 9	The Legend of Zelda: Breath of the Wild	Guggenheim Museum
2018	December 10	Red Dead Redemption 2	Guggenheim Museum
2019	December 9	Star Wars Jedi: Fallen Order	Bilbao Exhibition Centre
2020	December 12	The Last of Us Part II	Virtual
2021	December 11	It Takes Two	Bilbao Exhibition Centre
2022	November 19	God of War Ragnarök	Bilbao Exhibition Centre
2023	December 18	The Legend of Zelda: Tears of the Kingdom	Bilbao Exhibition Centre
2024	December 6	Astro Bot	Bilbao Exhibition Centre
2025	TBA	TBD	Bilbao Exhibition Centre

== Award winners ==
=== 2011 ===
The first ceremony for the Titanium Awards was celebrated at the Campos Eliseos Theater on November 8, 2011, and it was presented by Patricia Conde and Alex Odogherty.

Category	Winner
Game of the year (European)	Battlefield 3
Game of the year (Non-European)	Uncharted 3: Drake's Deception

=== 2012 ===
Category	Winner
Game of the year	Halo 4

=== 2013 ===
Category	Winner
Game of the year	Grand Theft Auto V

=== 2014 ===
Category	Winner
Game of the year	Middle-earth: Shadow of Mordor

=== 2015 ===
The following list are adapted from IGN Spain:

Category	Winner
Bizkaia Award	Alexey Pajitnov
Vanguard Award	Tim Schafer
Honorific Award	James Armstrong
Game of the year	The Witcher 3: Wild Hunt
Best Script	The Witcher 3: Wild Hunt
Best Soundtrack	Life Is Strange
Best Game Design	Star Wars: Battlefront
Best Debut Game	Undertale
Best Original Idea	The Delusions of Von Sottendorff and his Square Mind
Better National Development	The Delusions of Von Sottendorff and his Square Mind
Best Performance (in Spanish)	Claudio Serrano for Batman Arkham Knight
Best Sports Game	NBA 2K16
Best Competitive Game	Tom Clancy's Rainbow Six Siege
Best independent game	Mind Path to Thalamus
Best Motor Game	Forza Motosport 6
Best Art Design	Ori and the Blind Forest

=== 2016 ===
The ceremony took place at the Guggenheim Museum of Bilbao and was presented by the actress Itziar Atienza and the journalist Toni Garrido. The awards were handed by Ed Vaizey, the basketball player Alex Mumbrú and the comedian Hovik Keuchkerian.

Category	Winner
Bizkaia Award	Yuji Naka
Vanguard Award	Harvey Smith
Honorific Award	Warren Spector
Game of the year	Uncharted 4: A Thief's End

=== 2017 ===
The ceremony was held in the Guggenheim Museum of Bilbao and was presented by the journalist Iñaki López and the actress Itziar Atienza.

Category	Winner
Bizkaia Award	John Romero
Honorific Award	Jordan Mechner
Vanguard Award	Jeff Kaplan
Game of the year	The Legend of Zelda: Breath of the Wild

=== 2018 ===
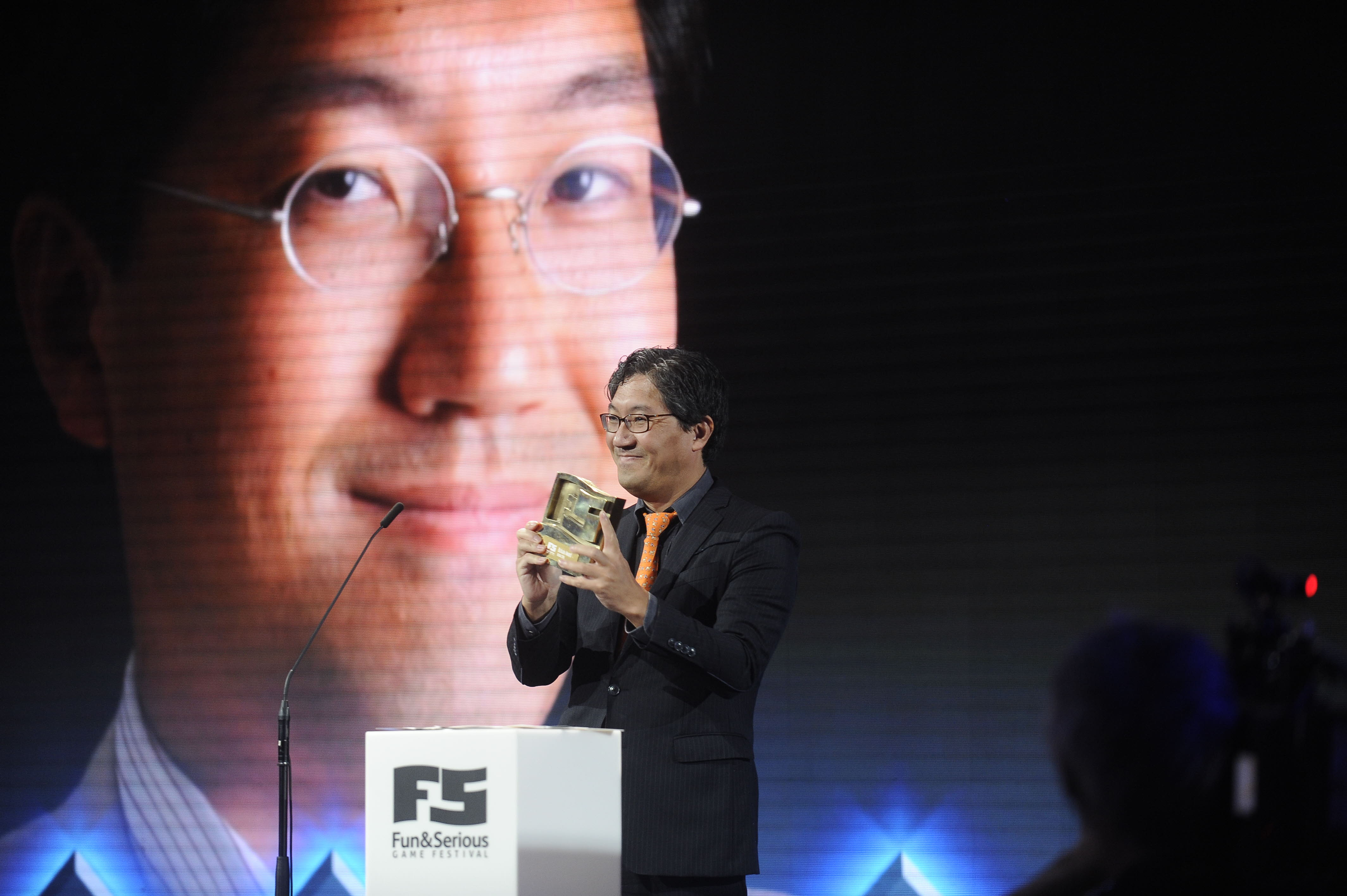
Yuji Naka, at the 2018 ceremony

Category	Winner
Bizkaia Award	Fumito Ueda
Honorific Award	Brenda Romero
Pioneer Award	Jade Raymond
Game of the year	Red Dead Redemption 2

=== 2019 ===
Category	Winner
Bizkaia Award	Tim Willits
Vanguard Award	Bruce Straley
Pioneer Award	Yoko Shimomura
Honorific Award	Greg Street
Game of the year	Star Wars Jedi: Fallen Order
