= List of Zeebo games =

This is a list of Zeebo video games released in Brazil and Mexico. A total of 57 video games were released for the Zeebo during its lifespan from 2009 to 2011. All of these were distributed via digital download.

Name	Developer	Brazil Launch	Mexico Launch	Price in Z-Credits (Brazil)	Size
Action Hero 3D: Wild Dog	Com2uS Studios	May 25, 2009	November 4, 2009	990	6.71 MB
Alien Breaker Deluxe	Vega Mobile	May 20, 2010		990	12.32 MB
Alice in Wonderland: An Adventure Beyond the Mirror (Alice no País das Maravilhas)	Zeebo Interactive	November 9, 2010		1690	15.51 MB
Alpine Racer	Namco Bandai	May 25, 2009	November 4, 2009	1490	12.32 MB
Armageddon Squadron	Polarbit	September 28, 2009		1690	7.77 MB
Bad Dudes (Bad Dudes Vs. DragonNinja)	Onan Games	July 27, 2010		1290	3.55 MB
Bejeweled Twist	PopCap Games	September 29, 2009	November 4, 2009	1490	14.70 MB
Brain Challenge (Treino Cerebral)	Gameloft	May 25, 2009	N/A	Free	16.53 MB
Caveman Ninja (Joe & Mac)	Onan Games	April 16, 2010	Mar 31, 2010	1290	5.2 MB
Crash Bandicoot Nitro Kart 3D	Polarbit	May 25, 2009	Nov 4, 2009	1990	8.11 MB
Dark Seal (Gate of Doom)	Onan Games	May 4, 2010		990	4.44 MB
Disney's All Star Cards	Sora Studios	September 21, 2010		990	8.94 MB
Double Dragon	Brizo Interactive, Million Co.	May 25, 2009	Nov 4, 2009	1490	3.36 MB
FIFA 09	Zeebo Interactive	May 25, 2009	N/A	Free	8.52 MB
Galaxy on Fire	Fishlabs	October 8, 2009	Nov 4, 2009	1690	10.81 MB
Heavy Barrel	Onan Games	July 27, 2010		1290	3.76 MB
Heavy Weapon	Vega Mobile	December 16, 2009	December 23, 2009	1490	13.12 MB
Iron Sight	Deion Mobile	September 28, 2009		1490	17.20 MB
Karnov's Revenge (Fighter's History Dynamite)	Onan Games	April 16, 2010	April 13, 2010	1290	9.85 MB
Magical Drop III	Onan Games	April 22, 2010		1290	10.99 MB
Need for Speed Carbon: Own the City	Zeebo Interactive	May 25, 2009	N/A	Free	2.52 MB
Pac-Mania	Namco Limited	June 16, 2009	November 4, 2010	1290	12.49 MB
Peggle	Vega Mobile	March 9, 2010		1490	13.15 MB
Powerboat Challenge	Fishlabs	October 12, 2010		1690	6.43 MB
Prey Evil	MachineWorks Northwest	May 25, 2009	N/A	10	0.352 MB
Quake	Zeebo Interactive	May 25, 2009	N/A	10	438 KB
Quake II	Zeebo Interactive	May 25, 2009	N/A	10	8.33 MB
Raging Thunder II	Pixelbrite	December 7, 2010		1990	14.10 MB
Rally Master Pro	Fishlabs	December 21, 2009	December 23, 2009	1690	14.17 MB
Reckless Racing	Pixelbrite	November 3, 2010	N/A	1990	29.26 MB
Resident Evil 4: Zeebo Edition	Ideaworks3D	August 11, 2009	N/A	2490	7.88 MB
Ridge Racer	Namco Limited	August 11, 2009	November 4, 2009	1990	20.62 MB
Spinmaster	Onan Games	April 16, 2010	March 31, 2010	1290	6.72 MB
Street Slam (Street Hoop) (Dunk Dream)	Onan Games	April 16, 2010	March 31, 2010	990	7.28 MB
Super Burger Time	Onan Games	April 16, 2010	April 13, 2010	990	3.38 MB
Tekken 2	Namco Limited	October 8, 2009	November 4, 2009	1990	21.34 MB
Tork and Kral	Vega Mobile	November 16, 2010		990	12.03 MB
Toy Raid	Flying Tiger Entertainment	March 9, 2010	March 8, 2010	990	7.29 MB
Turma da Mônica em Vamos Brincar nº 1	Zeebo Interactive	December 21, 2010	N/A	1490	16.88 MB
Ultimate Chess 3D	Superscape	December 9, 2009		990	4.44 MB
Un Juego de Huevos (Um Jogo de Ovos)	Fabrication Games	April 12, 2010	August 24, 2010	1990	29.29 MB
Wizard Fire (Dark Seal II)	Onan Games	April 16, 2010	April 15, 2010	990	6.77 MB
Zeebo Extreme: Baja	Zeebo Interactive	October 31, 2009	November 4, 2009	1490	10.15 MB
Zeebo Extreme: Bóia Cross (Acqua Ride)	Zeebo Interactive	December 21, 2009	December 23, 2009	1490	21.06 MB
Zeebo Extreme: Corrida Aérea (Air Race)	Zeebo Interactive	September 29, 2009	December 7, 2009	1490	10.60 MB
Zeebo Extreme: Jetboard	Zeebo Interactive	December 21, 2009	July 21, 2010	10	20.44 MB
Zeebo Extreme: Rolimã (Ruleman)	Zeebo Interactive	August 15, 2009	December 8, 2009	10	15.41 MB
Zeebo Family Pack	Jadestone Group	September 29, 2009	November 4, 2009	1990	21.43 MB
Zeebo F.C. Foot Camp	Zeebo Interactive	June 2, 2010		1690	17.11 MB
Zeebo F.C. Super League	Zeebo Interactive	December 22, 2010		1990	18.14 MB
Zeebo Sports Peteca (Zeebo Sports Badminton)	Zeebo Interactive	May 11, 2010	November 1, 2010	1990	7.17 MB
Zeebo Sports Queimada (Zeebo Sports Quemado)	Zeebo Interactive	February 5, 2010	November 1, 2010	1990	7.66 MB
Zeebo Sports Tênis (tennis)	Zeebo Interactive	October 15, 2009	November 1, 2010	1990	3.59 MB
Zeebo Sports Vôlei (volleyball)	Zeebo Interactive	December 14, 2009	November 1, 2010	1990	4.81 MB
Zeeboids	Zeebo Interactive	June 2, 2010		290	
Zenonia	Gamevil	October 31, 2009	November 4, 2009	1690	10.96 MB
Zuma's Revenge	Vega Mobile	July 14, 2010		1290	15.29 MB
