= Zeebo (disambiguation) =

Zeebo can refer to:

- Zeebo Entertainment and Education System
- Zeebo Inc.
- Zeebo (To Kill a Mockingbird character)
- Zeebo (iCarly character)

== See also ==
- Gazebo
