= Need for Speed: Carbon – Own the City =

2006 racing video game

Need for Speed: Carbon
- PlayStation Portable cover art showing the Mitsubishi Lancer Evolution IX
- Developers: Team Fusion (PSP) (Note: PSP version ported to Zeebo by Tectoy Digital.); Exient Entertainment (DS); Pocketeers (GBA)
- Publisher: Electronic Arts
- Series: Need for Speed
- Platforms: Game Boy Advance; Nintendo DS; PlayStation Portable; Zeebo
- Release: October 31, 2006: NA: October 31, 2006; EU: November 3, 2006; AU: November 9, 2006 Zeebo; BR: May 25, 2009
- Genre: Racing
- Modes: Single-player; multiplayer

Need for Speed: Carbon – Own the City is a 2006 racing video game and the third portable installment in the Need for Speed series. Developed by Team Fusion and published by Electronic Arts, it was released on October 31, 2006, for the PlayStation Portable, Game Boy Advance, Nintendo DS and on May 25, 2009 as a pack-in title for the Zeebo. The game, a companion title to Need for Speed: Carbon, includes new or modified gameplay elements, a different setting and storyline, and a different selection of teammates. It is the final installment in the series to be released for Game Boy Advance.

== Gameplay ==
Gameplay screenshot showing the player driving a Toyota MR2. The game also makes use of light vehicular combat mechanics as shown by the player targeting an opponent car to be disabled by their crew member.

Own the City features similar gameplay to the console editions, but while the Autosculpt function, Canyon Race events and drifting events are absent, the portable edition allows for free-roaming around the game's setting of Coast City, (Note: The overall map layout in the PSP and Zeebo versions is reused from the Rockport map from Most Wanted, while the DS and GBA versions do not feature free roam.) offers three new racing events, and modification to some of the gameplay mechanics. The new events consist of Escape, in which players attempt to escape from a rival crew's territory; Delivery, in which players and their crew race to a designated area with a package and attempt to beat other racers doing the same thing; and Crew Takedown, in which players to eliminate a set number of rival racers to win. During free roam, the player can explore the city and seek out crates scattered across the game's setting, in a similar manner to the hidden package system in Grand Theft Auto, which when broken unlock rewards ranging from cash to game art. Police pursuits can occur in Own the City, but only in free roam; the player is not pursued during racing events.

Players can hire up to five wingmen for their racing crew, in which two members may be active for use in racing events, though like Carbon they cannot be used in the game's Lap Knockout, Escape, and Crew Takedown events. Wingmen are divided into three classes – Brawlers, Drafters, and Assassins. While the first two classes operate in a similar manner to Carbon's wingmen roles of Blockers and Drafters respectively, Assassins replace the console's role of Scouts, and can be used to take out multiple rivals with deployable spike strips. The game's main mode of gameplay requires players to take control of territory – unlike the setting of Palmont, Coast City features around 13 areas of territory across 6 districts, with each area that is conquered unlocking new items for purchase and a new wingman for the player to recruit.

== Plot ==
The player and their brother Mick compete in an illegal street race with two other racers, seeking to see who will own the whole of Coast City amongst them. However, the race ends in a car crash that kills Mick and leaves the player in the hospital with amnesia. In the aftermath of Mick's death, his control over the city's territories is divided up between various street racing crews. When the player wakes up six months later, they are greeted by Mick's girlfriend Sara and their wingman Carter, both of whom help the player regain their memories of the race when visiting their brother's grave.

The player sets out to find who killed Mick, forming a crew to help them race and defeat the other crews, regaining territory and asking the defeated crew bosses what they know about the race's accident. During this time, Sara disappears. Eventually, the player is informed that a young driver named Buddy caused the crash, whereupon a crew boss known as EX helps the player to locate Buddy. When they confront the driver, the player learns that Buddy was hired by someone to kill Mick, and hands them a phone. Upon completing more races, the player encounters and defeats an undercover police officer named MK, who uses his connection with the city's police to trace Buddy's employer. The player soon discovers that EX planned Mick's murder, and so pursues after and defeats him, leaving him to be apprehended by MK and the city police.

Sara soon returns and instructs the player to race her, whereupon she reveals that the player arranged for EX to kill Mick. Sara reveals that the player's brother had a monstrous personality that led to her and the player being hurt, so the player arranged for Mick to be killed in an accident during a race to be rid of him, thus allowing Sara and themself to be free. Sara soon embraces her freedom, handing over Mick's watch and stating how different the player is to him.

== Reception ==
Reception

Aggregate score
| Aggregator | Score |
|---|---|
| Metacritic | (PSP) 73/100 (NDS) 70/100 |

Review scores
| Publication | Score |
|---|---|
| GameSpot | (PSP) 7.9/10 (NDS) 7.6/10 (GBA) 6.5/10 |
| IGN | (NDS) 7.5/10 (PSP & GBA) 7.0/10 |
| Play | 76% |
