= Need for Speed: Most Wanted (2005 video game) =

2005 open world racing game

- Cover art featuring a BMW M3 GTR (E46)
- Developers: EA Canada; EA Black Box; Team Fusion (PSP); Sensory Sweep Studios (DS); Pocketeers (GBA)
- Publisher: Electronic Arts
- Writer: Adrian Vershinin
- Composer: Paul Linford
- Series: Need for Speed
- Platforms: Game Boy Advance; GameCube; Nintendo DS; PlayStation 2; PlayStation Portable; Windows; Xbox; Xbox 360
- Release: NA: November 16, 2005; EU: November 25, 2005; AU: November 28, 2005; NA: November 22, 2005 (X360); EU: December 2, 2005 (X360); AU: February 23, 2006 (X360)
- Genre: Racing
- Modes: Single-player; multiplayer

Need for Speed: Most Wanted is a 2005 racing video game, and the ninth installment in the Need for Speed series following Underground 2. Developed and published by Electronic Arts (EA), it was released in November 2005 for GameCube, PlayStation 2, Windows, Xbox, and Xbox 360 alongside two distinct versions for Nintendo DS and Game Boy Advance. Another version for PlayStation Portable titled Need for Speed: Most Wanted 5-1-0, was released at the same time and featured alternative gameplay.

Most Wanted focuses on street racing-oriented gameplay involving a selection of events and racing circuits found within the fictional city of Rockport. The game's main story involving players taking on the role of a street racer who must compete against 15 of the city's most elite street racers to become the "Most Wanted" racer in Rockport City. In the process, they will seek revenge against Clarence "Razor" Callahan, one of the group who took their BMW M3 GTR (E46) car, and develop a feud with the city's police department led by police sergeant Jonathan Cross. The game brought in many notable improvements and additions over other entries in the series, its major highlight being more in-depth police pursuits. Certain editions of the game were packaged with the ability for online multiplayer gaming.

Upon its release, the game received acclaim from critics and became a commercial success, selling over 18 million copies worldwide, becoming the best selling game in the series. Its success led to a Collector's Edition, known as the Black Edition, which provided additional content. A PS2 Classics version was available for PlayStation 3 via the PlayStation Store in May 2012, until it was discontinued the following year. The game was succeeded by Need for Speed: Carbon in 2006, which continues Most Wanted's story. A reboot by the same name, developed by Criterion Games, was released in October 2012.

== Gameplay ==
In the game, players take part in illegal street races across Most Wanted's setting, utilizing a variety of licensed real-world cars that can be upgraded and customized with new parts while contending with the involvement of the police in their efforts to impede the player. Racing events feature a mixture of competitive racing across circuit or point-to-point races, and checkpoint, sprint and drag races. The game features three modes of play – Career, Quick Race, and Challenge Series – with a fourth mode allowing for multiplayer being available to players on certain console editions. While many of the racing events feature those used in previous entries in the games, particularly the Underground set of games, some events – Drifting, Street X, Underground Racing League tournaments and Outrun – are absent from Most Wanted, and replaced with two new ones.

- The first event is Tollbooth, a checkpoint-styled solo race, in which players must hit a set of checkpoints, each one within a set amount of time; reaching a checkpoint quickly adds the time left over to the timer for the next checkpoint.
- The second event is Speedtrap, in which players compete in a competitive checkpoint race, and must hit each checkpoint at their fastest speed; upon crossing the finishing line, each checkpoint's total speed is accumulated to determine the winner. Speed accumulated by the player or opponent gets deducted by 10 km/h (6.2 mph) after an opponent crosses the finish line first; this is signified by intermittent flashing on-screen until the player (or the other opponent cars) crosses the finish line.

The game features a selection of stock cars to choose from, each of which can be modified during the game's career mode with upgrades to enhance its performance and visual appearance. Customization of the car's appearance is limited; the main emphasis of customization is to reduce the car's heat level rather than for reputation as in the Underground series – while some elements that were possible in the previous installments were removed, others received minor changes such as players being able to make use of whole body kits on cars, the use of only one vinyl for the vehicle, and exterior colours being limited to the car's main body, wheels and window tinting. Additional cars are available for the player to use – most of which are acquired from the game's Blacklist Racers or unlocked after defeating a Blacklist Racer, while others are bonuses available from completing challenges; a number of cars available in the game are exclusives added in by the Black Edition copy of the game. Police cars cannot be driven in the game, except during special events in the game's Challenge Series mode. For Most Wanted exotic cars (such as the Mercedes-Benz SLR McLaren, Lamborghini Murciélago, and Ford GT) are reintroduced into the series alongside the tuner cars after the Underground titles only focused on tuner cars. Most Wanted, like the Underground series, avoids the use of major vehicle damage on all racing models, with only scratched paint and heavily cracked windshields constituting the whole of the racers' damage modelling. Police cars, on the other hand, sustain heavy damage when hit by the player's car or caused by the player to crash into other cars or obstacles.

During races and the game's Career mode, players can make use of nitrous boosts to help give them an edge against opponents. Unlike in Underground 2 where nitrous had to be refilled manually by performing stunts and earning style points, nitrous boosts now recharge automatically over time (as long as the car is moving; recharge stops when the car is idling), thus allowing the player to re-use it when needed. Players can use a second ability to help out in tough situations called "Speedbreaker" – when used, the ability slows down time (similar to bullet time), induces drift and momentarily increase the weight of the player's vehicle to make it harder to be pushed around, thus allowing players to maneuver their vehicle out of a difficult situation.

=== Police Pursuit ===
The player's car, a Porsche Carrera GT, is being pursued by several undercover state police cars and a police helicopter in Free Roam mode. This screen-shot depicts the use of simulated HDRR on the sunny sky and surface lighting.

While the concept of players being engaged by police had been a feature of most entries in the series since the first Need for Speed title, the development of Most Wanted saw the gameplay mechanic enhanced and firmly introduced into the series through the employment of a complex system. When players become engaged in a police pursuit, usually from conducting a traffic offence (referred to as "Infractions" in the game) in sight of a police unit (such as speeding), their aim at this point is to escape from the pursuit by either evading or taking out pursuing vehicles. The game's on-screen HUD is modified during a pursuit, including highlighting pursuing police units on the mini-map, displaying the vehicle's heat level, and adding a Pursuit bar at the bottom detailing the number of police units in the pursuit, how many have been evaded, and how many have been taken out. The pursuit system calculates how the police handle the player via the heat level accumulated against the player's current car. Heat accumulates from committing offences and continually evading capture by the police, with higher levels of heat causing the police to be more aggressive, from employing additional tactics and tools (such as roadblocks, spike strips, and police helicopters), to involving stronger, faster police cars such as police SUVs and Federal units. If a player has only one car actively pursuing them, reinforcements may be called in and arrive after a period of time.

Players can lose the police through skillful driving, making use of their special abilities, ramming pursuing vehicles and utilizing "Pursuit Breakers" – environmental traps, highlighted on the mini-map, which when triggered cause a certain number of police vehicles to be taken out of action, such as smashing through a gas station. Evading and losing the police – either by disabling/immobilizing vehicles, gaining some distance from pursuers, or a combination of both – does not end a pursuit, once there are no more active vehicles. Instead, the player enters a "cooldown" period when this happens, which pauses the pursuit (and any reinforcements being called in), they must hide and avoid being spotted by police for a period of time. The length of time for this period is longer at higher levels of heat but can be decreased significantly if the player reaches and hides in special concealment spots around the game's setting, which are marked on the mini-map during this phase and are used to place them out of sight of police units. A pursuit fully ends when the player successfully escapes the police, or is overwhelmed and trapped, and thus "busted" as a result.

=== Career Mode ===
In the game's main mode, the objective is to race against each of the setting's major street racers (or Blacklist Racer) and defeat them. Initially, players begin by completing a tutorial sequence of events to ease players into the game, whereupon they must choose a car to use for the rest of the game. The selection available is limited, but more become available as the player defeats each Blacklist racer, including better performance upgrades for these, with players able to sell series of racing events which earn money rewards when won, Milestones focus on completing specific objectives, most of which usually involve being involved in a police pursuit and raising the player's bounty – a form of currency detailing how much trouble the player has caused for the police in the game's setting, based on the number of offences and damage to property they had caused. An example of a Milestone can be the player being required to enter a police pursuit and then attempting to escape it within a set amount of time.

Police pursuits in this mode can occur in Free Roam, during a race, or from activating one in the game's pause menu – the latter can be done only if there are any Milestones yet to be completed. Although police units will mainly impede a player if they begin pursuing them in a race, they will attempt to arrest them when in Free Roam. If the police achieve this, the player is fined based on their heat level, which is reset, and their car is given an impound strike – if the player cannot pay their fines, or receive a third strike on their car, it is impounded and lost; losing all of their cars this way and having no money to buy a new one, automatically ends the game. If the player escapes pursuit, the car retains the heat level it accumulated but can lose this by either having its visual looks changed or by driving another vehicle for a period of time. Players can view a statistic screen at any time during this mode to view their records regarding infractions, the cost to state, deployed tactics and pursuit lengths.

To take on each Blacklist racer, players must complete events and Milestones associated with them, whereupon they must win against the racer in a successive series of races – the number increases as the player progresses in the story. Defeating a Blacklist Racer not only unlocks the next opponent and a new series of events, along with new Milestones to achieve but also unlocks additional cars and upgrade parts as well, along with allowing the player to claim two rewards from them. Each Blacklist Racer has six rewards they can offer when defeated. While three of these rewards consist of special customization parts and unique performance upgrades, the other three, concealed from the player until selected, consist of the racer's personal car – a uniquely modified vehicle – and two randomly selected bonus functions – extra money; impound recovery of lost vehicles; a "get-out-of-jail-free-card"; an impound strike limit extension on any car. Any component Markers selected can be acquired by visiting the garages after returning to Free Roam. In addition, defeating specific Blacklist Racers unlocks access to the other districts of the city – the player has access to one district, to begin with, but unlocks more as they progress in the game, including additional safehouses.

=== Quick Race, Challenge Series and multiplayer ===
In Quick Race mode, players can enter any event they wish and use any car that they want, while opting to either make custom parameters for the event (i.e. the number of laps) or let the game create a random set of parameters. The number of events and cars to choose from depend on the player's progress in the game's Career mode.

In Challenge Series mode, players take part in a successive series of events, in which completing one unlocks the next event. While around half of these are focused on checkpoint races, the other consist of a mixture of pursuit events akin to the Milestone events in Career Mode, with each event tasking the player to complete its goal using a specific vehicle on a specific route/from a starting position, and beginning on a certain level of heat. Vehicles for each event are pre-tuned, and range from various cars available in Career mode to those not accessible such as dump trucks and police cars. Completing specific challenges rewards the player with bonus cars for use in Career and Quick Race mode.

Multiplayer in Most Wanted consists of online modes, which were available for the Xbox 360, Xbox, PC and PlayStation Portable editions of the game. Up to 4 players can participate in an online race across 4 game modes including circuit, sprint, lap knockout and speed trap. Furthermore, there is the option to enable Performance Matching in an online race – all cars in the race are automatically upgraded to match the performance (i.e. top speed, handling, etc.) of the fastest car in that particular race. As soon as the race is over, all modifications made to the cars by performance matching are removed. The online multiplayer lobby was shut down on August 1, 2011, though it is still possible to play the game in multiplayer via an unofficial modification called "Most Wanted Online" and "EA Nation Hub".

== Plot ==
=== Setting ===
Most Wanted takes place in the fictional city of Rockport, which consists of three major districts: Rosewood, Camden Beach and Downtown Rockport. The city consists of areas featuring grimy industrial complexes, affluent suburbs, mountainous and wooded surroundings, a university campus, and a downtown core, with a mixture of road networks ranging from coastal roads to major highways. The setting is heavily influenced by cities from across the United States' "Rust Belt" and Pacific Northwest, with some resemblances to Pittsburgh, Pennsylvania, Seattle, Washington and Portland, Oregon. Much of the game's events and story take place in a fixed time period between sunrise and sunset, compared to the previous title's races that took place at night.

=== Story ===
In Rockport City, the Rockport Police Department (RPD) work to put an end to the illegal street racing scene. A task force of traffic officers led by police sergeant Jonathan Cross (played by Dean McKenzie) works to take down any street racers, most prominently including a group known as the "Blacklist" – the fifteen "Most Wanted" racers who have gained notoriety for their racing skill and their frequent and hazardous illegal driving and capture bounty.

The protagonist, an unnamed street racer, arrives at Rockport with a custom painted blue and silver BMW M3 GTR (E46) to face the Blacklist and meets fellow street racer Mia Townsend (played by Josie Maran) who is driving in a red Mazda RX-8 SE3P in the southern bridge towards Camden Beach. The player races her until Rockport, where she inexplicably leaves as Cross, who is driving a black and white Chevrolet Corvette C6, approaches the player along with his female partner, and narrowly avoids arrest after Cross is called to an ongoing pursuit.

The protagonist then randomly finds and races against Ronald "Ronnie" McCrea, who is driving a yellow Toyota Supra (A80), and after defeating him, attracts the attention of Ronnie's boss, Clarence "Razor" Callahan (played by Derek Hamilton), the Blacklist's #15 racer with a black Ford Mustang GT (S197). He receives help from Mia with setting up a race against Toru "Bull" Sato, another henchman of Razor with a black Mercedes-Benz SLR McLaren (C199), who proceeded to call the police to raise the stakes. The player wins against Bull despite police interfering with the race.

The protagonist then meets and faces off against Rog (voiced by André Sogliuzzo), a street racer driving with a black and red Pontiac GTO (2005), in a friendly circuit race. Impressed, he decides to be by his side, warning him to 'watch his back with these guys'. Razor meets the player at an intersection, congratulating him for clearing his challenges before racing him for a chance to usurp him on the Blacklist; he warns him that all Blacklist races are "street racing pink slip" events, meaning a loss also means the loss of the loser's car.

Challenging Razor in a street racing a few days later, the player's BMW M3 GTR (E46) breaks down near the end of the race due to engine failure after leaving an oil slick at the start line; he loses the race, forcing him to forfeit his car to Razor. Cross and his female partner soon arrive with the RPD and arrests the protagonist for street racing after Razor and the other street racers escape, but is forced to release him due to a lack of evidence as he no longer has a car to drive.

Once free, Mia picks him up from the police station and reveals to him that Razor had sabotaged his car in order to seize it and use it to climb up in ranks within to the #1 rank of the Blacklist, and advises him to do the same in order to get revenge. She provides the player with a safehouse and helps him secure a new car using the money won from the previous races with Ronnie, Bull and Rog. The player begins working to compete against the Blacklist in a series of street racing and challenges involving police pursuits. Although Mia helps him, she also puts 'side bets on him' and tells him to look the other way in exchange for the help.

In time, the protagonist rises up in the ranks, gaining enough reputation to soon attract Razor's attention once they become the #15 racer on the Blacklist. From thereon, he randomly calls the player throughout the game, later in the game getting enraged and accusing him of being a cop or hanging out with a cop due to the increasing police scrutiny in races throughout Rockport. Mia also supplies the protagonist with a rap sheet, while Rog provides help and advice to the player as well regarding each Blacklist racer.

In the endgame, the rivals compete again in another 5-street racing pink slip, with the player eventually defeating Razor. Seeing him not backing down, Mia snatches the BMW M3 GTR (E46) keys from Razor and when Razor attempts to steal them back, she subdues him and throws him to the ground, revealing herself to be an undercover police officer for the RPD, who had been working to bring down the Blacklist from the inside for Cross, by flashing a badge and showing her service weapon at the rest of the Blacklist, forcing them to back down when they tried to retaliate.

Cross and his female partner soon arrive with backup to arrest the Blacklist racers before they can flee. Before Razor and all of the Blacklist racers can be arrested, Mia tosses the keys to the player, allowing him to run and covers for him. Cross subsequently demands his female partner that the entire RPD go after him, who is now the Most Wanted racer in Rockport City. As the RPD begins a citywide manhunt for him, Mia contacts and informs him of an escape route out of the city by jumping a derelict bridge on the city limits, the BMW M3 GTR (E46) being fast enough to make the jump. The player successfully evades Cross and the cops by jumping the bridge and eventually escaping Rockport. In a post-credits scene, Cross creates a national-level warrant for the player and his vehicle, adding him to the National Most Wanted List. This event leads to the sequel, Need for Speed: Carbon.

== Development and release ==
Promotional screenshot of Rockport's fall foliage of Most Wanted for the Xbox 360 with Porsche 911 Turbo S

The cutscenes in the game are live-action videos shot with real actors and set pieces, and CGI effects are added to car exteriors and environments for extra visual flair. The videos are presented in a significantly different style from the Underground series, and this presentation of cut scenes is used again in Carbon and Undercover.

The depiction between all of the versions graphics-wise is not the same, especially on portable versions. The Microsoft Windows version varies by hardware and can look better compared to the console versions. The recommended hardware or above has a similar frame rate to the Xbox 360 version. The game makes heavy use of the HDRR and motion blur effects to give a more realistic feel.

=== Other versions ===
Need for Speed: Most Wanted 'Black Edition, a collector's edition of Most Wanted, was released in celebration of the Need for Speed series' 10th anniversary and in conjunction with the release of Most Wanted. The Black Edition features additional races, bonus cars and other additional content. The Black Edition comes with a special feature DVD that contains interviews and videos about the game. The Black Edition was released for Microsoft Windows, PlayStation 2 and Xbox in the United States and Australia; only the PlayStation 2 version of Black Edition was released additionally for Europe.

Need for Speed: Most Wanted 5-1-0 is a PlayStation Portable port of Most Wanted, released on the same day as its console and personal computer counterparts. Similar to Most Wanted, Most Wanted 5-1-0 features a similar Blacklist 15 listing and Career Mode, with the addition of "Tuner Takedown", a "Be the Cop" mode not featured on Most Wanted. Most Wanted 5-1-0 lacks many elements of its other console and PC counterparts, like cut scenes, a storyline and a free roam mode, and contains minor differences (including listing the real name of a Blacklist racer rather than his/her nickname). The title of the game is based on the numerals "5-1-0", which is the police code for street racing.

A port for the Nintendo DS with the same name was released to generally negative reviews. It is considered to be the worst game in the franchise and one of the worst racing games ever made.

The latest patch for the Windows version (1.3) was released on December 6, 2005.

== Soundtrack ==
The music featured in the game are mostly licensed music by EA Trax. It is a variety of music genres ranging from rap, hip-hop, electronica, and rock, sung by artists like The Prodigy, Celldweller, Styles of Beyond (who is known for performing the game's signature menu theme song, "Nine Thou" as well as performing another song called "Shapeshifter" with Celldweller), Rock, Lupe Fiasco, Disturbed, Avenged Sevenfold, BT & The Roots (who is known for performing the song "Tao of the Machine" that was originally in Blade II), Static-X, Bullet for My Valentine, and Hush. The rap songs mostly play in the game's main menu, while hip-hop, rock songs, electronica, and techno music mostly play during race sequences. The game features a score composed by Paul Linford that plays during pursuit sequences. Paul Linford, alongside Chris Vrenna, developed two original songs that play during races; "The Mann" and "Most Wanted Mashup". The licensed songs can be played during free roam, races, and are optional during pursuit chases if the player chooses to not play the licensed score performed by Paul Linford, or may not be played at all. Some of the pursuit chase music would eventually be featured in its successor, Need for Speed: Carbon.

== Reception ==
Reception

Aggregate score
Aggregator	Score
Metacritic	NGC: 80/100; PC: 82/100; PS2: 82/100; PSP: 72/100; DS: 45/100; XBOX: 83/100; X360: 83/100

Review scores
Publication	Score
1Up.com	A−
Game Informer	8.5/10
GameRevolution	B+
GameSpot	8.4/10
GameSpy	4/5
IGN	8.5/10

Need for Speed: Most Wanted was met with positive reviews. GameSpot praised the game for its "sharp graphics" and "outstanding sound effects", but noted the AI for being sometimes easy at first, and sometimes hard at later stages. IGN praised the map design, describing it as "a crazily chromed out, sepia-tone landscape of industrial structures", the car modelling, the car line up and the return of exotics. Particularly strong praise was given to the police system, saying that the cops continually grow in aggressiveness and numbers and they add component of challenge, annoyance, and heat that makes this game challenging and entertaining. Praise even went to the cut-scenes and their casting, which usually falls victim to critics, saying that this mixture of animated, highly coloured FMV characters and stylized backgrounds is both imaginative and refreshing. During the 9th Annual Interactive Achievement Awards, the Academy of Interactive Arts & Sciences awarded Most Wanted with "Racing Game of the Year", along with a nomination for "Outstanding Character Performance - Female".

Need for Speed: Most Wanted was a commercial success; it sold over 18 million copies worldwide and 3.9 million in the United States, making it the best-selling title in the series. The PlayStation 2 version received a "Double Platinum" sales award from the Entertainment and Leisure Software Publishers Association (ELSPA), indicating sales of at least 600,000 copies in the United Kingdom.

=== Legacy ===
The BMW M3 GTR with silver-blue livery featured in the game gained a cult following on the internet. When searched online, the majority of the results for the car are related to Most Wanted. Owing to its iconic status, fans have recreated the livery in real life. The M3 GTR has appeared in other Need for Speed titles as a playable car, first appearing in the 2012 title Need for Speed: Most Wanted and making its first modern appearance in Need for Speed (2015). For the 30th anniversary of the Need for Speed series and 20th anniversary of Most Wanted, BMW designed a special edition M3 GTR based on the design from the video game as a homage. This car was briefly exhibited at the BMW Welt museum from December 2024 to January 2025. Actor Derek Hamilton, who played Clarence "Razor" Callahan in the video game, also visited the museum. Need for Speed Unbound's final seasonal update is directly based on Most Wanted.
