= Zeebo Sports =

Set of Brazilian video games

- Genre(s): Sport
- Developer(s): Tectoy Digital
- Publisher(s): Tectoy and Zeebo Inc.

Zeebo Sports is a Brazil-only series of video games for the Zeebo system.

The series was originally named Boomerang Sports, because the games were designed exclusively for use with Zeebo's "Boomerang" motion-sensitive controller. In August 2010, however, Zeebo released new versions of the games that can use either the Boomerang or the standard Zeebo gamepad. The series was renamed Zeebo Sports.

== The games ==
=== Released ===
| Title | Details |
|---|---|
| Zeebo Sports Tênis October 15, 2009 (Brazil) – Zeebo-only | Notes: The first game of the series and also the first Zeebo game use the Boomerang. Zeebo Sports Tênis is a tennis game playable by one or two players. |
| Zeebo Sports Vôlei December 14, 2009 (Brazil) – Zeebo-only | Notes: The second in the series, a volleyball game for one or two players. |
| Zeebo Sports Queimada February, 2010 (Brazil) – Zeebo-only | Notes: The third title in the series, a dodgeball game for one or two players. |
| Zeebo Sports Peteca May 11, 2010 (Brazil) – Zeebo-only | Notes: The fourth in the series, a badminton-style game for one or two players. |
