= Férias Frustradas do Pica-Pau =

1996 video game

Férias Frustradas do Pica-Pau Woody Woodpecker's Frustrated Vacations
- Cover art of Férias Frustradas do Pica-Pau
- Developer: Tec Toy
- Publisher: Tec Toy
- Platforms: Mega Drive; Master System
- Release: BRA: October 1996 (MD)
- Genre: Platform
- Mode: Single-player

Férias Frustradas do Pica-Pau (Woody Woodpecker's Frustrated Vacations) is a platform video game developed and published by Tec Toy for the Mega Drive, and the Master System, it was released in October 1996 for Brazil only. This video game was based on the animated short film series created by Walter Lantz, and the title and some of the game art makes references to the Brazilian release of National Lampoon's Vacation under the name Frustrated Vacations.

== Gameplay ==
The player takes the role of Woody Woodpecker. Woody's attack is using his beak to attack at enemies. One can also jump to cross platforms or to avoid enemy attacks such as throwing acorns. Also the player would have to collect money bags which are across the levels. Aiding Woody Woodpecker is a rocket pack which makes the player travel faster and a horn to wake Wally Walrus, but these only appear in the Mega Drive version.

== Story ==
Woody running through the first level, about to be hit.

At the start of the game, Woody Woodpecker and his friends are travelling down in a car towards their vacation spot. When Woody takes a photo of his friends, a flash suddenly makes them disappear. A letter falls and it reads that Buzz Buzzard (known as Zeca Urubu in Portuguese) has kidnapped Woody's friends and the first to go is Andy Panda. Woody has to save them. Oswald the Lucky Rabbit is one of the characters that must be saved.

== Development ==
Férias Frustradas do Pica-Pau was developed by Brazilian company Tec Toy, which had previously produced local adaptations of existing Sega games featuring popular Brazilian characters. Unlike those earlier releases, the game was developed from scratch. According to an October 1996 report in Ação Games, development took almost three years, during which several employees joined and left the project. Woody Woodpecker was selected as the protagonist because of his popularity among Brazilian audiences.

Development assistant Edson Takeshi explained that the game's story was submitted for approval in the United States. An illustrator was subsequently commissioned to produce the artwork, which was scanned and converted into digital images. Tec Toy's engineers then programmed the characters' movements and other game functions. The completed game featured approximately 70 individual stages.

== Reception ==
Marjorie Bros of the Brazilian magazine SuperGamePower awarded the Mega Drive version a score of 3.2 out of 5. The reviewer praised Tec Toy's achievement in creating an original Brazilian game rather than modifying an existing Sega title, but criticized its graphics and character animation, which were considered technically unimpressive. Nevertheless, the review expressed optimism about the company's potential as a video game developer.
