= Need for Speed: Carbon =

2006 racing video game

- European cover art featuring Kenji's Mitsubishi Lancer Evolution IX and a Dodge Challenger drifting through a corner
- Developers: EA Black Box; Rovio Mobile (mobile); TransGaming (Mac OS X); Global VR (arcade)
- Publishers: Electronic Arts; Global VR (arcade)
- Composer: Trevor Morris
- Series: Need for Speed
- Platforms: Windows; Mac OS X; PlayStation 2; PlayStation 3; Xbox; Xbox 360; GameCube; Wii; Arcade; Mobile phone
- Release: October 31, 2006: Mobile; UK: October 27, 2006; NA: November 30, 2006 GC, Xbox; NA: October 31, 2006; EU: November 3, 2006; AU: November 9, 2006 PS2, Windows, Xbox 360; NA: October 31, 2006; EU: November 3, 2006; AU: November 16, 2006 PlayStation 3; NA: November 17, 2006; PAL: March 23, 2007 Wii; NA: November 19, 2006; EU: December 8, 2006; AU: December 14, 2006 Mac OS X; NA: August 17, 2007 Arcade; NA: 2008
- Genre: Racing
- Modes: Single-player; multiplayer

Need for Speed: Carbon is a 2006 racing video game and the tenth installment in the Need for Speed series. Developed by EA Black Box, Rovio Mobile and published by Electronic Arts, it was released on October 31, 2006, for the PlayStation 2, Xbox, Xbox 360, GameCube, Windows, and Mac OS X, on November 17, 2006 as a launch title for the PlayStation 3, and November 19, 2006 as a launch title for the Wii and in 2008 for arcade cabinets. A portable version, Need for Speed: Carbon – Own the City, was released for the PlayStation Portable, Game Boy Advance, Nintendo DS and Zeebo. While it featured similar gameplay to the console versions, the portable versions included new or modified gameplay elements, a different setting and storyline, and a different selection of teammates. Own the City is the final installment in the series to be released for Game Boy Advance.

Carbon's storyline takes place after the events of Need for Speed: Most Wanted, and sees players conducting illegal street races within the fictional city of Palmont City. The story focuses on the player's character taking control of the city from various street-racing gangs. While the gameplay is similar to its predecessor, Carbon introduced a number of new features, including crews and racing wingmen, Touge-styled racing events, and greater customization options.

Upon the release of Carbon, the game received positive reviews from critics, though it faced some criticism over elements of its gameplay mechanics, including a lack of emphasis on police chases compared to its predecessor. A special Collector's Edition version was also released for PlayStation 2, Windows and Xbox 360. It included additional content; such as new cars, new customization items and new events for two of its game modes. As of 2021, download versions of the game are no longer available for purchase in any online stores, and online play was shut down on September 1.

The game was succeeded by Need for Speed: ProStreet in 2007.

== Gameplay ==
=== Overview ===
A heavily modified Audi Le Mans quattro compared to a stock Lamborghini Murciélago LP-640, showing the "Autosculpt" feature of the game

In the game, players take part in illegal street races that focus on different styles of races, utilizing a variety of licensed real-world cars (available at the time of the game's development and release) that can be upgraded and customized with new parts, while contending with the involvement of the police in their efforts to impede the player. Racing Events focus on competitive races with other drivers on circuits or point-to-point routes, checkpoint races, and races involving sprints or drifting (the latter being absent in its predecessor), with players able to use Nitrous Oxide and Speedbreaker whenever needed – either to help win races or get out of tight spots – both of which recharge over time. The game itself features four game modes – Career, Quick Race, Challenge Series, and Multiplayer – with the latter featuring online gameplay available in all console and PC versions of the game, except for the Wii version.

The game operates on the same gameplay mechanics used in previous entries in the series, including its predecessor Most Wanted, though Carbon introduced new elements. A new element exclusive to Carbon is Canyon events – special racing events styled after Japanese Tōge racing, in which players compete in competitive racing on canyon roads outside the game's main setting. These events consist of sprints, drifting and duel events, in which the latter two feature a majority of destructible guardrails that the player must avoid crashing through or risk losing these respective events as a result. Duel events on these circuits operate differently to events involving major rival racers in Need for Speed games, as these are conducted across two stages on a canyon circuit – in each stage, one driver acts as the chaser and pursues the other at close proximity, with the first stage seeing the player as the chaser and scoring points the closer they can tail their opponent, while in the second stage their opponent becomes the chaser and the player must keep as much distance as possible to avoid losing too many points before the stage is completed. At the end of both stages, the car who took the lead wins if their score is positive, otherwise, their opponent wins if they turned it negative. Apart from scores, an instant win is possible depending on which mode the Duel is conducted in – in Career mode, the player can win instantly if they can stay ahead of their opponent for ten seconds, but lose if they fall behind for too long; in Online Multiplayer, a player wins if their opponent crashes through a guardrail.

Police pursuits, a staple of the series, function similar to Most Wanted in that police can turn up at any time during a race and attempt to impede the player during the event, except in Canyon Race events and checkpoint races; in Career mode, the police can also turn up during Free Roam, but will not act against the player unless they have a warrant (for evading a previous pursuit) or committed an offence in their sight, whereupon they focus on blocking in and arresting the player unless they can lose them and find a safe spot to hide until they lose their heat. As the player is pursued, they can either attempt to evade the cops or knock them out of action by ramming their cars or using destructible props called Pursuit Breakers to impede their pursuit, though extensive pursuits will cause the player's heat level to rise, leading to stronger pursuit tactics including spike strips, roadblocks, and the involvement of state/federal authorities. Carbon modified the pursuit function by making police less dominant in arrest tactics at higher heat levels, and reducing the chance a Pursuit Breaker blocks/destroys a pursuing vehicle.

Licensed real-world cars used in the game are divided into three tiers (performance level) and three classes – Exotic, Tuner, and Muscle. For example, a Nissan 240SX is a tier 1 tuner car, while a Corvette Z06 is a tier 3 muscle car. Each car class also has advantages and disadvantages in terms of driving styles. Tuner cars have the best handling and cornering but have the lowest acceleration and top speed. Muscle cars have the best acceleration but have poor handling. Exotic cars have the highest top speed and better handling than Muscle cars but are not as agile as Tuners. Cars receive visual damage during the game, but no physical damage. Cars can be upgraded in performance through new components and fine-tuning of each component – such upgrades can help, for example, to improve speed, or improve braking. Carbon added the ability to customize visual parts via autosculpt parts, which allow adjustments of components for example, while adding flexibility with vinyls and decals by allowing them to be placed in layers over each other, with the ability to modify these in shape and size, and place them anywhere on the car. Additional cars and customization parts can be acquired through completing Reward Cards – each card consists of a set of challenges for the player to complete across the game modes, and reward the player either with a new vehicle to use or new parts for customization.

=== Career Mode ===
The game's main mode focuses on the player competing in races against rival street racing crews, instead of individual racers like in Most Wanted and Underground 2. When starting in Career mode, players must choose a class that is not only permanent for their playthrough in this mode, but also dictates which of the initial three districts in the game's setting they begin in and which racing events are available first. Additional cars and classes become unlocked as the player progresses in this mode; any cars earned from Reward Cards for Quick Race mode are also available but without limitation. Players operate their own crew in Career mode and can recruit AI wingmen to assist them, each of whom operates under a different role – Blocker, Drafter, and Scout – and specialty – Fixer, Mechanic, and Fabricator. The type of role and specialty that each wingman operate under dictates how they assist the player – some can find shortcuts during races, while others can help to reduce police heat – with their role also dictating which car they drive in; the first two wingmen the player unlocks have their cars match the player's chosen class. During races, players may use their wingmen for a period of time, after which they must wait a while until their wingmen gauge has recharged before they can use them again, with the exception of scouts, who use their role for the entire race to find shortcuts.

To win career mode, players compete in races against other crews to secure territory – each district has a number of territories, each controlled either by the district's main crew or a minor crew through a series of racing events. Winning a majority of the races in a territory converts control to the player's crew and unlocks additional races elsewhere. Races that have been won can be engaged again, but the prize money offered is reduced as a result. Taking control of all territories will unlock a duel event with the main crew's boss, in which winning the event will allow the player to unlock special rewards, in a similar manner to the rewards offered in rival events in Most Wanted. As the player accumulates territories, they can lose any earned by losing control over its racing events to minor crews, either by failing to defeat them in takeover challenges or forfeiting the right to do so.

=== Quick Race ===
Quick Race mode allows players to create custom events for single-player or multiplayer – both splitscreen or online – making use of any circuit and cars in the game, and altering various factors such as the difficulty of opponents, track conditions and so forth; what cars and circuits can be used depends on the player's progress in Career mode, though all players can be allowed to use wingmen they have unlocked in these events, provided this option is allowed.

=== Challenge Series ===
Challenge Series consists of a series of racing events that are divided into 12 categories, each divided further into three difficulty levels. Each challenge event requires the player to complete a specific goal, depending on the type of event, using a set car on a specific course in the game. Players may choose any category to begin with, unlike in Most Wanted, but must complete in order of Easy to Hard. Completing all of the difficulty levels of a challenge unlocks either a new car or customization option for the player to use in other modes.

=== Online Multiplayer ===
Online Multiplayer mode includes circuit, sprint, canyon duels, and two multiplayer exclusive events – Pursuit Knockout and Pursuit Tag:

- In Pursuit Knockout, players compete in laps of a circuit, with each player in last place being knocked out and returning as cops to hinder the other players. The winner is the player who ends the race in first place.
- In Pursuit Tag, one player is a racer and must evade the others, who operate as the cops. If the player is arrested by another, they switch roles. The winner is the player who spends the most time as the racer.

== Plot ==
=== Setting ===
Carbon takes place within the fictional city of Palmont, which encompasses four boroughs linked by a highway system; Kempton, which houses the city's industrial complexes; Downtown, which houses the city's metropolitan and financial buildings; Fortuna, which houses the city's residential area; and Silverton, which houses the city's casino & resort facilities. The city is also surrounded by three canyons known as East, West, and Carbon, which feature their own layout of the route, but which are not connected to Palmont. There is also a city called San Juan, a fictional town based on Santa Fe, New Mexico. The city differs from others in that it is isolated from Palmont and has no connection to it. In Career Mode, it is used as a tutorial before the player goes to Palmont; In the game's story, which takes place during a fixed period at night, the player is not able to access Silverton until they have made progress in career mode and only can access the canyon routes during events.

=== Story ===
Several years prior to the events of Most Wanted, a street racer (whose role is assumed by the player) took part in a major street race around Palmont for a large cash prize. The three other racers were each the leader of a street racing crew: Bushido's Kenji (Ken Kirby), 21st Street's Angie (Danielle Kremeniuk), and T.F.K. (The Fortuna Kings)'s Wolf (Shaw Madson). However, the racers were ambushed by the Palmont Police Department (PPD), who had SWAT immobilize the player's opponents with an EMP and began arresting everyone involved. The player escaped with the help of Darius (Tahmoh Penikett), the leader for the Stacked Deck, and his then-girlfriend Nikki (Emmanuelle Vaugier); before leaving she handed over the bag containing the race's prize money, but it turned out to contain paper. Under Darius' advice, the player quickly fled Palmont after being accused of sabotaging the race.

Following his narrow escape from Rockport, the player returns to Palmont but is pursued along a canyon route by former police sergeant Jonathan Cross, who after previously appearing as a police officer in Most Wanted, now works as a bounty hunter and seeks revenge against him. After a long and heated canyon chase, the player's BMW M3 GTR gets totaled, and Cross attempts to arrest them for the 150-thousand-dollar bounty on their head but is paid off by Darius. Offering to help the player, Darius asks Nikki, who now dates him, assist him despite her belief that the player betrayed everyone for the prize money. With Nikki's help, the player receives two crew members – Neville (Chris Gauthier) and Sal (Elias Toufexis) – to help in races and a safehouse to operate from. On Darius' advice, the player begins taking part in street races for control over territories controlled by rival crews across three of the city's main boroughs. In the process, he also engages against Kenji, Angie and Wolf, defeating them and securing a member of their crew to aid them, each of whom confides in the player that they suspect someone else set up both them and each crew member's former bosses as Yumi (Melody), Colin (Steve Lawlor), and Samson (Noah Danby) were all at the race between the player, Angie, Wolf, and Kenji, and each of them saw a vital piece of evidence to confirm the race had been rigged and doomed to an ambush by the PPD all along.

After securing all three boroughs, Darius calls a meeting with the player, only to reveal that he sought to use the player to take control of the city from the other crews, betraying him to Cross. After leaving, Nikki arrives to save the player after making a secret deal with Cross. She soon reveals that Darius was responsible for setting up the player for the theft of the prize money – Darius had tipped off the police, and in the chaos that ensued, switched out the prize money while leaving the player to take the blame by helping them escape the police sting. Now aware of the truth, Nikki sides with the player to help take control of the last city borough, leading Darius to reinforce his crew with assistance from Kenji, Angie and Wolf to prevent this. The player eventually defeats Darius and his crew, gaining control of all of Palmont's territory and wins Darius's Audi Le Mans quattro in a pink slip, despite Darius warning them to enjoy their victory before someone faster than them takes over.

== Development ==
Need for Speed: Carbon was first shown in EA's montage at Nintendo's E3 2006 conference and booth and was the cover story in the Game Informer magazine issue from July. Carbon features some of cars of its predecessors, namely Need for Speed: Underground 2 and Need for Speed: Most Wanted, but also incorporates many new additions including the Audi Le Mans quattro, the Chrysler 300C SRT 8, Chevrolet's Chevelle SS, and the Alfa Romeo Brera. Carbon features the Canadian actress and model Emmanuelle Vaugier as Nikki, the player's main source of help and ally in the Career storyline. The game is available for use with Mac OS X and is the only game in the Need for Speed series available on a Macintosh computer. The minimum system requirements for Mac OS X include an Intel Core Duo processor. Need for Speed: Carbon debuted at number one on the UK All Format Gaming Chart on its first week of release, beating Konami's Pro Evolution Soccer.

Carbon was also the first game in the series to feature detailed character animations for the Windows and seventh-generation releases using facial motion capture, where in-game models of characters such as Neville, Darius, Wolf, Angie and Kenji appear in real-time cutscenes taunting or remarking the player in a race or at certain points. This has however been omitted on the sixth-generation and Wii versions due to platform limitations.

The Need for Speed: Carbon – Collector's Edition was released for PlayStation 2, Windows and Xbox 360. It features four exclusive cars, ten pre-tuned cars, six new races, three unique challenge events, ten unique vinyls and a Bonus DVD showing the making of Carbon and showcasing all the cars used in the game. The Collector's Edition also features alternate box art and a metallic-finish sleeve encasing the case of the game. Although the Mac edition doesn't display the Collector's Edition title, it contains all Collector's Edition features. The downloaded version of the game features the Ultimate Performance Kit, 2006 Pagani Zonda F and the 1971 Dodge Challenger R/T. An arcade version of the same name was released by EA Arcades in 2008.

The arcade version was developed by Global VR.

== Soundtrack ==
The game features a licensed soundtrack by EA Trax just like other games developed by EA. Unlike most other games, there are different songs depending on what car category you are using. For Tuners, it mostly plays electronica music performed by artists like Gary Numan, Ladytron, The Presets, as well as Melody (who is known for portraying the Bushido crew member Yumi in the game). For Muscles, they mostly play rock songs performed by artists like Eagles of Death Metal, Wolfmother and Kyuss. For Exotics, its mostly rap songs performed by Ekstrak, Pharrell, Sway, Spank Rock and Dynamite MC. These songs can only be heard during free roam or checkpoint races. The game also has a composed soundtrack performed by Trevor Morris that mostly plays during race sequences and canyon duels. Some of the pursuit chase music performed by Paul Linford that was originally featured in Need For Speed: Most Wanted also plays during pursuit chases.

== Reception ==
Reception

Aggregate score
Aggregator	Score
Metacritic	(PC) 78/100 (X360) 77/100 (PS3) 75/100 (GC) 75/100 (PS2) 74/100 (Xbox) 74/100 (Wii) 67/100

Review scores
Publication	Score
GameSpot	(PC, X360 & Xbox) 7.6/10 (PS2, PS3, & GC) 7.4/10 (Wii) 7.1/10
IGN	(PC) 8.2/10 (PS3) 7.9/10 (GC & Xbox) 7.8/10 (Wii) 7.4/10
Play	76%

Need for Speed: Carbon was met with generally positive reviews. IGN gave the PC version an 8.2 out of ten and the PlayStation 3 version a 7.9 out of ten. GameSpot gave praise for adding more movie clips, customization and solid gameplay, but was critical about frustrating boss battles and underutilizing police chases.

Electronic Gaming Monthly gave the game an average score of eight. Hyper's Daniel Wilks commended the game for its "large gameworld", but criticized it for its easy drift course mechanics and the actors in the cutscenes. The Australian video game talk show Good Game gave the game five out of ten.

Macworld editor Peter Cohen gave the Mac OS X port four out of five stars, praising the variety of different cars to choose from and engaging storyline. Mild criticism was noted relating to performance issues.

The Academy of Interactive Arts & Sciences nominated Need for Speed: Carbon for "Racing Game of the Year" at the 10th Annual Interactive Achievement Awards.

Need for Speed: Carbon has sold 3.2 million copies in the United States. Its PlayStation 2 version received a "Double Platinum" sales award from the Entertainment and Leisure Software Publishers Association (ELSPA), indicating sales of at least 600,000 copies in the United Kingdom.
