= Un Juego de Huevos =

2010 video game

- Logo of Un Juego de Huevos
- Developer(s): Fabrication Games
- Publisher(s): Zeebo Inc.
- Platform(s): Zeebo
- Release: MEX: April 19, 2010; BRA: August, 2010
- Genre(s): Platform
- Mode(s): Single-player, Multiplayer

Un Juego de Huevos is a 2D platform videogame, created exclusively for the Zeebo system by Swedish studio Fabrication Games. It is the first videogame based on Una Película de Huevos, the hit movie from the Mexican animation company Huevocartoon. The game was released on April 19, 2010, in Mexico. A version with Portuguese text was released in Brazil in August, 2010, under the title Um Jogo de Ovos.

The game features all the main characters from Una Película de Huevos, including Toto, Willy, Confi, Serp, Cuache and Tlacua, voiced by the same actors used in the movie. The story is also based on the film, but follows an alternative plotline. Un Juego de Huevos is the first videogame based on a Mexican license. The goal of the game is to explore and battle through a series of increasingly difficult challenges. The game provides 25 levels, 5 battles with bosses and 10 unlockable levels of competition. It supports one or two players in cooperative or competitive modes.

A package consisting of the Zeebo system plus the game, a keyboard and a Huevocartoon DVD, was launched in Mexico with promotional price of $1999 pesos, accompanied by a merchandising campaign in some department stores.
