= Zeeboids =

- Developer(s): Zeebo Interactive Systems
- Publisher(s): Zeebo Interactive Systems
- Platform(s): Zeebo
- Release: WW: June 2,2010
- Genre(s): Content creation
- Mode(s): Single-player

Zeeboids is an avatar creation application developed by Zeebo Interactive Studios in Brazil and released exclusively for the Zeebo system. Zeeboids is compatible with Zeebo Football Club (F.C.) games such as Zeebo F.C. Foot Camp, enabling players to create custom characters ("avatars") and participate in online rankings.

== Creating Zeeboids ==
Zeeboids has 24 options for customizing the look of the characters—including skin, physique, hairstyles and other features—and 12 different uniforms. It keeps track of and rewards avatar accomplishments, allows players to upload scores, take part in online rankings and use their avatars on each other's Zeebo systems.

== Compatible games ==
Title	Developer	Publisher	Genre
Zeebo F.C. Foot Camp	Zeebo Interactive Studios	Zeebo Inc.	Sports
Zeebo F.C. Super Liga	Zeebo Interactive Studios	Zeebo Inc.	Sports

== Online Tournament in Brazil ==
From June 11, 2010, concurrent with the 2010 FIFA World Cup, Zeebo Brazil held an online tournament for players with Foot Camp and Zeeboids. The top scorers in each of the four mini-games, as well as those with the best overall combined scores, were awarded free Z-Credits.

== See also ==
- Avatar
- Mii
- PlayStation Home
