= Zeebo Extreme =

- Genre(s): Sport
- Developer(s): Tectoy Digital
- Publisher(s): Tectoy, Zeebo Inc.

Zeebo Extreme is a series of 3D racing videogames created for the Zeebo system. The games were developed by the Tectoy Digital studio in Campinas, Brazil. To date, five Zeebo Extreme games have been introduced in Brazil and four in Mexico.

Each of the games involves a race over air, water or land in a particular type of vehicle, such as an airplane, billy cart or jet board. In single player mode, the player competes against the game. In two-player mode, players race against each other. The games offer a variety of courses, levels of difficulty and power-ups. The games use either the standard Zeebo Z-Pad gamepad or the Boomerang control, a motion-sensitive controller similar to the Wii Remote.

== Games ==
=== Released games ===
Title	Details
Zeebo Extreme Rolimã (Ruleman) Original release date(s): August 15, 2009 (Brazil) December 8, 2009 (Mexico)	Release years by system: 2009 — Zeebo
Zeebo Extreme Rolimã (Ruleman) Original release date(s): August 15, 2009 (Brazil) December 8, 2009 (Mexico)	Notes: The first game of the Extreme series, featuring downhill racing in billy carts.
Zeebo Extreme Corrida Aérea Original release date(s): September 29, 2009 (Brazil) December 7, 2009 (Mexico)	Release years by system: 2009 — Zeebo
Zeebo Extreme Corrida Aérea Original release date(s): September 29, 2009 (Brazil) December 7, 2009 (Mexico)	Notes: The second game of the Extreme series, featuring airplane racing through various landscapes.
Zeebo Extreme Baja Original release date(s): October 31, 2009 (Brazil) November 4, 2009 (Mexico)	Release years by system: 2009 — Zeebo
Zeebo Extreme Baja Original release date(s): October 31, 2009 (Brazil) November 4, 2009 (Mexico)	Notes: The third title in the series, featuring dune buggy racing across desert terrain.
Zeebo Extreme Bóia Cross Original release date(s): December 21, 2009 (Brazil) December 23, 2009 (Mexico)	Release years by system: 2009 — Zeebo
Zeebo Extreme Bóia Cross Original release date(s): December 21, 2009 (Brazil) December 23, 2009 (Mexico)	Notes: The fourth game of the series, featuring white-water racing on buoys.
Zeebo Extreme Jetboard Original release date(s): December 21, 2009 (Brazil) July 21, 2010 (Mexico)	Release years by system: 2009 — Zeebo
Zeebo Extreme Jetboard Original release date(s): December 21, 2009 (Brazil) July 21, 2010 (Mexico)	Notes: The fifth title of the series, featuring aquatic racing on jetboards.
