= FIFA 09 =

2008 video game

- UK cover featuring A.C. Milan's Ronaldinho and Manchester United's Wayne Rooney
- Developers: EA Canada; Exient Entertainment (DS)
- Publisher: EA Sports
- Producers: David Rutter; Andrew Wilson (executive)
- Designers: David Rutter (PS3 and Xbox 360); Kaz Makita (Wii); Paul Hossack (PS2, PSP, DS, PC)
- Series: FIFA
- Platforms: Microsoft Windows Consoles: PlayStation 2 PlayStation 3 Wii Xbox 360 Zeebo; Handhelds: PlayStation Portable N-Gage 2.0 Nintendo DS Java ME
- Release: AU: 2 October 2008; EU: 3 October 2008; NA: 14 October 2008; NA: 28 October 2008 (Wii); N-Gage: WW: 18 November 2008
- Genre: Sports
- Modes: Single-player, multiplayer

FIFA 09 (titled FIFA Soccer 09 in North America) is a football simulation video game developed by EA Canada and published by Electronic Arts under the EA Sports label. It was released in October 2008 for Microsoft Windows, Nintendo DS, PlayStation 2, PlayStation 3, PlayStation Portable, Wii, Xbox 360 and Zeebo. It was later in November 2008 released for the N-Gage 2.0 and mobile phones.

The demo was released on 10 September 2008 for Windows and on 11 September 2008 for PlayStation 3 and Xbox 360. The PS3 and Xbox 360 demos were identical with the exception of the stadium used with the PS3 featuring the FIWC Stadium and the Xbox 360 version using the new Wembley Stadium. The tagline for the game is "Let's FIFA 09".

== Improvements ==
It has been stated in an interview with game producer David Rutter that there are over 250 improvements in the game.

Among the improvements in the new FIFA are improved responsiveness that allows for quicker release of the ball, greater urgency in off-the-ball running, a new jostle system that takes into account the strength of the players when going shoulder-to-shoulder, and subtle animations that enable players to take first-time shots.

Another of the edition's biggest changes is a completely revamped collision system, which calculates speed, weight, and power when the players collide, as each player will have their own individual strength and power statistics depending on their body characteristics.

New goalkeeper technology has also been added which allows for better positioning, better reactions to saves, and faster recovery after a save has been made.

A further improvement from FIFA 08 is the weather and time. Rain and snow matches can be played from Kick-off mode, however there are no weather effects in Manager Mode. Games can be played at either day, dusk or night, depending on the stadium choice.

FIFA 09 includes a "10 vs. 10" "Be a Pro" online game. The game also features user-controlled player celebrations, like in UEFA Euro 2008, in the PlayStation 3 and Xbox 360 versions.

The "Be A Pro" mode of the game has also been improved. On the PC, Xbox 360, and PS3 version, the user can now play four seasons as a single player. The PS3 and Xbox 360 consoles also allow the player to change clubs, and play for his national team, depending on their performance. This feature is not present in the PC version.

=== Adidas Live Season ===
On 20 August 2008, EA unveiled the new Adidas Live Season feature that will dynamically update player form and attributes each week, in-game, based on the player's last game to reflect real-world ups and downs. Live Season is a premium service that will be available on PlayStation 3, Xbox 360, and PC and covers six leagues: the Barclays Premier League, the Liga BBVA, the Ligue 1, the Bundesliga, the Serie A, and the Primera División de México. Gamers have access to one league of their choice as a free trial that runs from the moment they activate the service to the end of the 2008–09 season, while purchasing extra leagues will cost £4.99 (US$7.99) each, or all six leagues can be purchased for £12.99 (US$20.00).

=== User-controlled celebration ===
User-controlled goal celebrations are also featured for the first time in the FIFA series, having been trialled in the official video game of Euro 2008. The player can choose from a variety of pre-loaded celebrations. This feature is on seventh generation consoles only (excludes PC and Wii) due to capacity limits.

=== Update ===
FIFA 09 was updated to correspond with the transfers made in the January 2009 transfer window. This update was added onto the game via an online squad download on 9 February 2009. On 19 March 2009, FIFA 09 was updated to version 13.02 that added the Ultimate Team mode and also Trophies for the PlayStation 3. On 6 June, version 13.03 was released. It fixed various bugs that were caused from the previous patch.

=== Ultimate Team mode ===
Ultimate Team is a downloadable game mode expansion for FIFA 09 available only on PlayStation 3 and Xbox 360. A similar game mode was featured in a previous EA Sports football game, UEFA Champions League 2006–2007. It lets users create their own teams by buying, selling, trading, and auctioning off their players with thousands of other users. Gamers earn points by playing their teams online or offline or by using Microsoft Points to buy card packs, or you can use coins which you gain from playing matches. Card packs are categorized as Gold (5,000 pts), Silver (2,500 pts), or Bronze (500 pts). Card pack contain random cards, so the user does not know exactly what they will get in them. Essentially, Ultimate Team is geared toward letting the user have full, customizable control over their teams. "You can also compete with your squad against others across the world

== Commentators ==
Martin Tyler and Andy Gray provide the English-language commentary for the game, although Tyler is replaced by Clive Tyldesley for the PC, Nintendo DS, PlayStation 2, PlayStation Portable and Wii versions. Users can also download free alternative commentators in 13 different languages from the PlayStation Store (PlayStation 3) and Xbox Live Marketplace (Xbox 360). Another option for the English language is Clive Tyldesley and Andy Townsend.

== Platform-specific information ==
=== Wii ===
The Wii version of the game is titled FIFA 09 All-Play (FIFA Soccer 09 All-Play in NA) and was launched under EA Sports' new All-Play brand exclusive to the platform. Even though it features the normal 11 vs 11 football match like the other consoles, a new, exclusive feature was introduced called 'Footii Match', which is an 8 vs 8 football match where your Mii plays against other Mii's. The object of this feature is to beat certain teams from around the world and unlock their "superstar team captain". For the first time, FIFA 09 on this platform features "Manager Mode" as found on other platforms. Also for the first time ever, users can now use GameCube and Classic Controller along with the Wii Remote and Nunchuk. There are two methods of playing. Firstly, All-Play is for players less experienced, as it has basic controls and the players move themselves unless a nunchuk is connected. The other method of playing is advanced play, which involves moving the player with the nunchuk and pointing the remote to the player the user wants to pass to.

=== DS & PSP ===
The PlayStation Portable and Nintendo DS versions include a "Be a Pro" mode for the first time.

=== PS3 ===
The PlayStation 3 exclusive game mode is a built-in FIFA Interactive World Cup. This will enable gamers to track their progress and play games through the game rather than relying on the website. FIFA 09 for the PS3 also supports rumble with the DualShock 3. In addition, like previous FIFA games, the PS3 version has support for seven players on the same screen. In the 1.02 update, Trophies were also included.

=== Windows and PlayStation 2 ===
The Windows and PlayStation 2 versions feature a special Tournament Mode, in which there are a total of 61 tournaments, including 42 officially licensed ones. The user can also create their own tournaments. Moreover, the PC version of the game contains mouse controls in addition to keyboard controls, by which the player can draw the trick moves using the middle mouse button.

== Covers ==
There are different covers for the regional versions of FIFA 09. All covers feature Ronaldinho with different players for each region except for the cover in Spain: the UK and Australian covers feature Wayne Rooney; the German cover features Kevin Kurányi; the Italian cover features Daniele De Rossi; the Irish cover features Richard Dunne; the Czech cover features Petr Čech; the French cover features Franck Ribéry and Karim Benzema; the Hungarian cover features Balázs Dzsudzsák; the Portuguese cover features Ricardo Quaresma; the Spanish cover features Gonzalo Higuaín; the Swiss cover features Tranquillo Barnetta; and the North American version features Guillermo Ochoa and Maurice Edu. Edu signed for Scottish team Rangers, which caused the cover to be altered to feature Edu in a US national team shirt and Ronaldinho appeared in a Milan shirt, so that a club shirt was featured.

== Leagues and teams ==
There are over 500 teams and 30 leagues in the game, as well as 41 national teams.

FIFA 09 has 41 teams in its international division. The most notable exclusion is Japan (who made it into the round of 16 in the 2002 World Cup and the 2010 World Cup, but whose licensing rights currently belong to Konami). The following international teams are playable in the current generation consoles. But not all the teams are fully licensed e.g. Netherlands and Russia.

== Stadia ==
There are 48 stadia in FIFA 09 (17 of which are fictional), with the majority being in England or Germany. There are also stadiums in France, Italy, Spain, Mexico, and Wales, with the national stadia of each of these countries also included.

== Soundtrack ==
The complete FIFA 09 soundtrack was announced by EA Sports on 14 August 2008. It features 42 songs from 22 different countries.

== Reception ==
Reception

Aggregate score
Aggregator	Score
Metacritic	DS: 84/100; PC: 77/100; PS2: 82/100; PS3: 87/100; PSP: 84/100; X360: 87/100; WII: 80/100

Review scores
Publication	Score
GameSpot	PS3/X360: 8.5/10
IGN	PS3/X360: 8.6/10

FIFA 09 was given an IGN rating of 8.6 out of 10 and received the Editor's Choice Award. It was also a nominee for Best Sports Game for the Nintendo DS by IGN for their 2008 video game awards. In addition, FIFA 09 got a GameSpot rating of 8.5 out of 10.

The Xbox 360 and PlayStation 3 versions of FIFA 09 each received a "Double Platinum" sales award from the Entertainment and Leisure Software Publishers Association (ELSPA), indicating sales of at least 600,000 copies per version in the United Kingdom.

During the 12th Annual Interactive Achievement Awards, the Academy of Interactive Arts & Sciences nominated FIFA 09 for "Sports Game of the Year".
