= Street racing =

Illegal motor racing on public roads

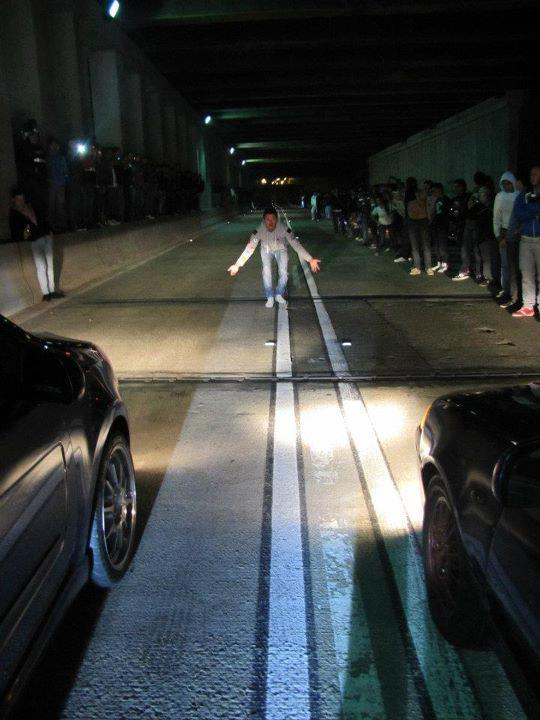
An illegal street race in Bogotá, Colombia

Street racing is an illegal form of motor racing that takes place on public roads. It typically involves drivers competing in speed contests or other forms of high-performance driving outside the regulation and safety controls of sanctioned motorsport. Street racing has existed for as long as automobiles have been in widespread use, and similar forms of racing on public roads predate the motor vehicle.

Street races may be spontaneous or carefully organised. Organised events are often coordinated in advance using mobile phones, messaging applications, social media, or radio communications, with participants and spectators sharing information about meeting points, road conditions and police activity.

Street racing is associated with an increased risk of traffic collisions resulting in serious injury or death to participants, passengers and bystanders. In many countries, it also encompasses related illegal driving activities such as drifting, burnouts, and other competitive or exhibition driving on public roads. Street racing is distinct from the legal and regulated sport of drag racing and other forms of sanctioned motorsport.

== Race types ==
=== Car meets ===
Car meets are gatherings by car enthusiasts (and sometimes street racers) with the purpose of meeting to share their passions with others. While some car meets may involve street racing, many meets may recommend not to race at all. This is to prevent attracting attention of local law enforcement. Some car meets are held at closed racing circuits.

=== Tōge racing ===
The sport of drifting and tōge (also transcribed touge) racing, primarily from Japan, is now more popular in other parts of the world. Tōge— Japanese for "mountain pass", because these races are held on mountain roads and passes— generally refers to racing, one car at a time or in a chase format, through mountain passes (the definition of which varies per locale and racing organization).

=== Sprints ===
"Sprints", also called "cannonball runs", are illegal point-to-point road rallies that involves two or more racers. They are inspired by authorized European races at the end of the 19th century. These races fell out of favor when the chaotic 1903 Paris–Madrid race was canceled at Bordeaux for safety reasons after numerous fatalities involving drivers and pedestrians. Point-to-point runs reappeared in the United States in the mid-1910s when Erwin George Baker drove cross-country on record breaking runs that stood for years. The term cannonball was coined for him in honor of his run when a local reporter gave him the nickname comparing him to the Cannonball Express locomotive of the Illinois Central Railroad.

In sprints, drivers will race from one part of city to another, one part of the country to another, or across a country. Whoever makes the fastest overall time is the winner. An example of a sprint race was the illegal Cannonball Baker Sea-to-Shining-Sea Memorial Trophy Dash in the 1970s, also known as "The Cannonball Run", that long-time automotive journalist Brock Yates founded. The exploits spawned numerous films, the best known being The Cannonball Run. In 1984, Yates created the family-friendly and somewhat legal version One Lap of America where speeding occurs in race circuits and is still running to this day.

The Gumball 3000 and Gumball Rally are present day examples of long distance sprints. These rallies mostly comprise wealthy individuals racing sports cars across the country. With the city changing for each rally.

== Terminology ==
Globally, an "official" lexicon of street racing terminology is difficult to establish as terminology differs by location. Examples of this diversity can be found in the various words utilized to identify the illegal street racers themselves, including hoonigan and boy-racer (New Zealand and Australia), tramero (Spain), hashiriya (Japan), and mat rempit (Malaysia).

== Motivations ==
There are various motivations for street racing, but typically cited reasons include:

- A 2023 pilot study of undergraduates by psychologist Julie Aitken Schermer found that a desire for loud, modified vehicles was significantly predicted by scoring higher on measures of psychopathy and everyday sadism.
- Generally, street racing is not sanctioned and thus leads to a less rigorously controlled environment than sanctioned racing, to the enjoyment of some participants.
- Street racing is cited as an activity which is available to people who are otherwise under-age for entertainment at traditional venues such as bars.
- A community generally forms around the street racing "scene", providing social interaction among the participants
- The opportunity to show off one's vehicle
- Partaking in racing without the entry fees, rules, and regulations present in motorsport.
- The excitement of racing when law enforcement is certain to give chase.
- A lack of proper, sanctioned racing venues in the locale.
- Street races are sometimes wagered on, either by the participants or observers. Most wagers involve cash, but rarely racers may wager their car
- To settle a bet, dispute, etc. between fellow racers
- The variation of road layouts. Public roads generally offer far longer and varied routes of racing compared to motorsport, especially winding country roads and hill passes that may provide changes in elevation and camber

== Dangers ==
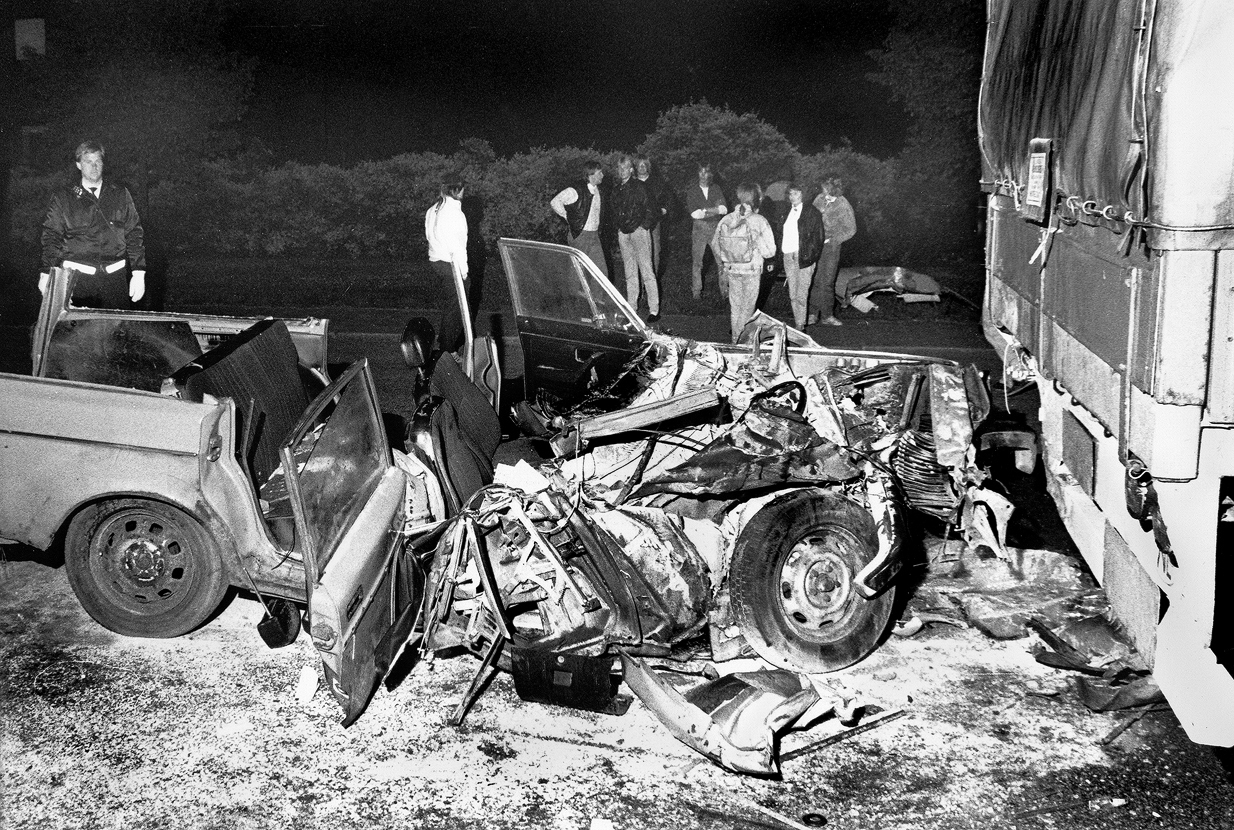
A police officer guards the wreckage after an accident. Shocked youngsters gather after their friend died after a street race. The car drove into a parked truck at high speed in Malmö Port 1988.

Dangers can include serious injury, legal consequences, and death. Between 2000 and 2018, at least 179 people died in street racing–related accidents in Los Angeles.

Additional dangers provided by the Kent, Washington police department are as follows.

- Traffic collisions, including fatalities
- Trespassing on private property
- Auto theft rates
- Public property damage in case of a collision
- Possibility of gang conflicts, terrorism, murder, gambling, or other crimes, especially when street racing is associated with organized crime or street gangsters.

Because vehicles used in street racing competitions generally lack professional racing safety equipment such as roll cages and racing fuel cells, and drivers seldom wear fire suits and are not usually trained in high-performance driving, injuries and fatalities are common results from accidents. Furthermore, illegal street racers may put ordinary drivers at risk because they race on public roads rather than closed-course, purpose-built facilities.

Because racing occurs in areas where it is not sanctioned, property damage may occur. As the street racing culture places a very high social value on a fast vehicle, people who might not be able to afford fast vehicles may attempt to steal them, violently or otherwise. Additionally, street racers tend to form teams which participate in racing together, which may ultimately contribute to organized crime, gang activity or prostitution.

== Types of racers ==
The predominant age range that participate in racing are those aged between 16 and 25. Male minorities that come from mid to lower social class are more likely to partake in street racing. Results from a survey of 2,395 street racers showed that 33% did not own a driving license and that 14% had been involved in a crash. Crashes usually happen during the night or in the early morning. Street racing constitutes only a small fraction of total car crashes, though street racers also constitute a very small fraction of total drivers. The urge for educational programs to teach people about the negatives of risky driving can minimize the rate of street racing. By doing so, this can help lower the rate of crashes by teenagers.

== By country ==
=== Africa ===
==== Nigeria ====
Part of a popular road in Abuja has been cited as a venue frequently used by street racers.

==== South Africa ====
Illegal street racing in South Africa has been a problem for a long time, mostly in Cape Town. Street racing harms members of the local community due to noise pollution, creating road hazards and traffic collisions. As of 2022 the authorities are developing measures to be taken to address illegal street racing.

=== Americas ===
==== Brazil ====
In Brazil, street races are commonly known as "pegas" or "rachas". Since 1997, the National Traffic Code of Brazil prohibits street racing, stunts, dangerous moves and related competitions in public streets; racers may have their driving licenses and cars confiscated, besides paying a fine and going to jail from six months to two years. Popular street racing venues are often discovered by police after receiving information from Crime Stoppers. In such cases, plainclothes officers are first sent to check if the information is correct. If so, the roads leading out of the place are blocked and the competitors arrested.

==== Canada ====
In Canada, a driver convicted of a causing a street racing fatality can be sentenced to life imprisonment as a maximum term, with full parole possible after serving 7 years in prison. A driver convicted of injuring another person in the course of a street race is subject to a prison term of at most 14 years.

==== United States ====
There is a strong racing culture in California, particularly Southern California. It is considered to be the birthplace of North American drag racing.

In some cases, this popularity has led to tough anti-street racing laws which give stricter penalties (including misdemeanors for attending race events) than normal traffic citations. San Diego was the first US city to prosecute spectators attending street races. Penalties for violating street racing laws may include impoundment and possibly the destruction of the offending vehicle and the suspension or revocation of the offender's driver's license.

Some police departments in the United States have also undertaken community outreach programs to work with the racing community to educate them to the dangers of street racing, as well as to encourage them to race in sanctioned events. This has also led to a campaign introduced in 2000 called Racers Against Street Racing (RASR), a grass-roots enthusiast group consisting of auto manufacturers, after-market parts manufacturers, professional drag racers, sanctioning bodies, race tracks and automotive magazines devoted to promoting the use of safe and legal raceways as an alternative to street racing.

=== Asia ===
==== China ====
In 2015, police conducted a raid, arresting 13 Hong Kong residents, who were fined and sentenced to between one and four months' jail, after being caught driving at up to 275 km/h (171 mph). The drivers, who drove a fleet of luxury sports cars including Ferraris, Lamborghinis and McLarens, were arrested at the border in Shenzhen trying to return to Hong Kong.

The law under which this arrest took place was enacted in 2010 after Hu Bin, a Hangzhou student, mounted the sidewalk in a street race, killing a pedestrian. A public outcry ensued, as Hu came from a wealthy family, while the victim was his family's sole income earner. Hu was sentenced to three years in prison and was fined 1.1 million yuan as well as an unspecified driving ban.

==== Japan ====
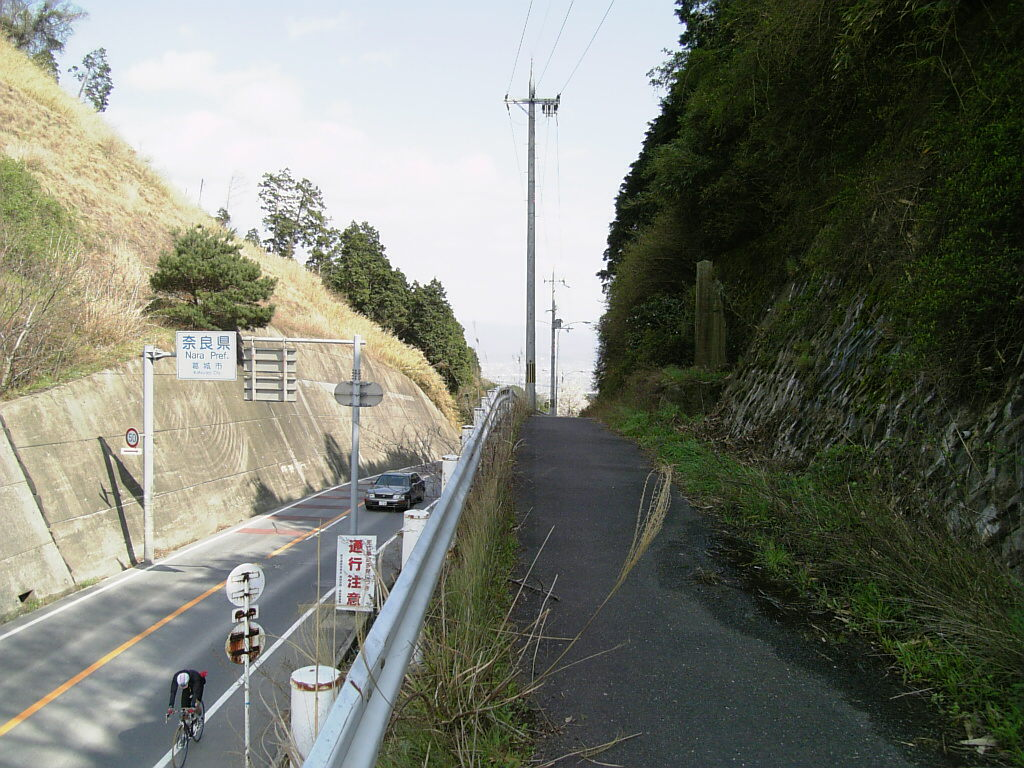
Takenouchi Pass (竹内峠), a tōge in Nara

Street racers, known natively as hashiriya (走り屋), often run their cars on expressways and freeways, where they are known as kōsoku battle or commonly known as Roulette-zoku as they drive round and round in circular motions and frequently occur on the Shuto Expressway in Tokyo.

The most notorious group to be associated with street racing was Mid Night, who became world famous for their speeds, at times exceeding 300 km/h (190 mph). With heavier punishments, increased police presence on roads, crackdowns in meeting areas and the installation of speed cameras, expressway racing in Japan became an extremely rare sight compared to its heyday of the 1980s and the 1990s.

One of the contributors to street racing in Japan is the overcrowding and limited availability of racing circuits. Such circuits may also cost as much as ¥20,000 for private use, while the highway tolls are much cheaper, averaging at less than ¥1,000.

==== Malaysia ====
Street racing in Malaysia is illegal, as is watching a street race; this is enforced by the Royal Malaysian Police. Many streets, roads, highways and expressways in Kuala Lumpur, Penang, Johor Bahru, and other cities or towns in the country have become sites for racing. Among the participants are teenagers driving modified cars or riding motorcycles.

Motorcycle street racers in Malaysia are known as Mat Rempit. These Mat Rempit are infamous for their "Superman" stunts and other feats performed on their motorcycles. They are also notorious for their "cilok", a kind of racing in which racers weave in-between moving and stationary traffic at high speed.

In addition to doing their stunts and racing around, they have a habit of causing public disorder. They usually travel in large groups and at times raid isolated petrol stations. They can cordon off normal traffic flow to allow their friends to race along a predetermined circuit.

Illegal drift racing often takes place on dangerous hill roads such as Bukit Tinggi, Genting Highlands, Cameron Highlands or Teluk Bahang, Penang. Meanwhile, illegal drag racing takes place on expressways such as the Second Link Expressway in Johor Bahru. Illegal racers are subject to punishment by their over-modified vehicles which do not follow road regulations in Malaysia.

==== Turkey ====
In Turkey, street racing is illegal. Since the 1960s, street racing has been a sub-culture of the Bağdat Avenue in Istanbul, where young wealthy men tag-raced their imported muscle cars. Towards the end of the 1990s, midnight street racing caused many fatal accidents, which came to a minimum level due to heightened police enforcement.

=== Europe ===
==== Albania ====
Street racing has been a sub-culture of Albania since the 1990s following the collapse of communism. Street racing became more organized in the 2000s, and gained public recognition during the 2010s because of magazines like Max Power. The roads near Skanderbeg Square in the national capital of Tirana are the most popular spot for street racing.

==== France ====
One of the first automobile races ever recorded took place in France. Organized by Le Petit Journal in France of December 1893, the newspaper aimed to create a race to show the viability of horseless carriages as a means of transportation for the average person. Of the constructors, first place was awarded jointly to Peugeot and Panhard et Levassor, whose vehicles “came closest to the ideal.” During the day long rally from Paris to Rouen, seven dogs were run over and killed, a cyclist was struck by a car and injured, and one of the drivers was seriously injured as he was scalded by an exploding boiler.

==== Germany ====
On 1 February 2016, two street racers disregarded several red lights and killed a 69-year-old pensioner, a father of two, when one of the drivers rammed his vehicle on the Kurfürstendamm in Berlin. In February 2017, the Landgericht Berlin sentenced the two drivers for collaborative murder, in the first murder conviction for street racers. The verdict was appealed to the Federal Court of Justice as it was not clear the drivers had driven with deadly intent or criminal negligence. The second trial was started over in August 2018 at which time the drivers had spent two years in detention. The second trial was annulled and a third trial started in November 2018. They were again convicted of murder in 2019. The verdict was again appealed to the Federal Court of Justice, who upheld the murder verdict against the main perpetrator in June 2020.

==== Greece ====
The first ever street race in Greece happened in 1907 at Syngrou Avenue, in the city of Athens, between Prince Andrew and Nikolaos Simopoulos, son of Anargyros Simopoulos, back when only 7 automobiles existed in town. The street race ended with the death of a 25-year-old woman and caused the first ever car crash in Greece.

Street racing has been a sub-culture of Greece since the 1970s. Street racing became more organized in the 1980s, and gained public recognition during the 1990s and 2000s through print media such as the Max Power magazine.

Until the mid-1990s, the Greek police did not strictly enforce bans on street racing. That changed when Greek media reported a serious car crash in Limanakia in the 1990s. This completely changed street racing culture in Greece, with strict police enforcement of the activity. For that reason a police unit called Sigma squad was created in 1995 which drove high-end sports cars like the BMW M3, the Audi RS2 and the Porsche 930 Turbo. The unit was disbanded in 2005 after various crashes and lack of funding.

==== Italy ====
Italy has a long tradition about street racing and tuned cars.

In the 2010s, track days at the Autodromo Nazionale di Monza become more popular with car enthusiasts with burnouts in the tunnel attracting many spectators. In the late 2010s and early 2020s, legal car meetings became popular in Italy. Injuries are still prevalent, such as a BMW driver who hit a crowd and injured some people in Turin in November 2018. Street racing is still popular in Italy, and can be divided into highway street racers and Tōge racers.

==== Portugal ====
In Portugal, an association of volunteer enthusiasts called Superdrivers, fight for sanctioned racing events to happen every weekend and opposes street racing. They complain that legal racing is only available once or twice a year and under restricted conditions.

==== United Kingdom ====
Street racing in the United Kingdom is illegal under the Road Traffic Act 1988. The punishment for a conviction of motor racing and speed trials on public ways is a mandatory driving ban and a fine not exceeding £2,500.

The city of Birmingham has been described as the street racing capital of the United Kingdom.

=== Oceania ===
==== Australia ====
Street racing in Australia occurs across the country, most notably in certain suburbs of major cities and semi-rural New South Wales and Victoria. People who participate, specifically the drivers themselves, are referred to as 'hoons'. The term is also used as a verb to describe reckless and dangerous driving in general ("to hoon" or "to hoon around").

Laws exist in all states and territories that limit modifications done to vehicles and prohibit having nitrous oxide hooked up to a car. In most states and territories, P-platers (provisional drivers) are not allowed to drive vehicles classified as "high-performance", such as those with a power-to-weight ratio greater than 130 kilowatt per tonne. In most states, further laws impose strong penalties for street racing such as confiscating or impounding the vehicle and loss of license.

==== New Zealand ====
New Zealand has strict rules on vehicle modifications and a registered engineer must audit any major modification to his/her car. Unofficial street racing remains illegal in New Zealand, however it is common. Participants are commonly referred to as 'boyracers'. Despite its popularity, rates of incident due to street racing in New Zealand are relatively low.

== Popular media ==
=== Films ===
In the 1970s the movies American Graffiti and The Hollywood Knights played a key role in the expansion of street racing.

Street racing has been a popular theme in many movies spanning different generations and genres.

=== Video games ===
Street racing has been frequently featured in video games throughout history with street racing being a popular sub-genre of racing games.

== See also ==
- Boy racer (UK term)
- Car chase
- Car tuning
- Custom car
- Hoon (Australian term)
- Tafheet
- Traffic stop
- Traffic collision
