= Anargyros Simopoulos =

Greek politician

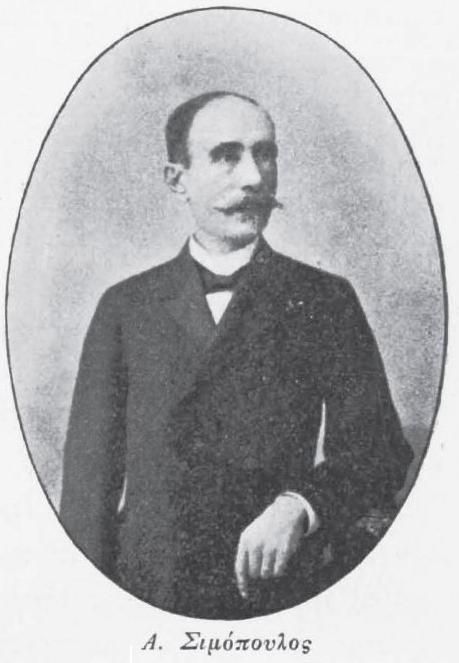
Anargyros Simopoulos in 1896.

Anargyros Simopoulos (Greek: Ανάργυρος Σιμόπουλος 1837–1908), was a Greek politician who served as minister of Finance in the Government of Dimitrios Rallis and Georgios Theotokis.

== Biography ==
Anargyros Simopoulos was born in 1837 in Parnassida. He was first elected MP in his hometown in 1882. Simopoulos served as Minister of Justice in the government of Charilaos Trikoupis (1892-1893). In 1897 he participated in the government of Dimitrios Rallis taking over the Ministry of Finance. He held the same position in the government of Georgios Theotokis : in the first term for two years 1899–1901, in the second term in 1903, in the third term for a subsequent two years 1903-1904 and in the last term from 1905 to 1908. Simopoulos had served as deputy governor of the National Bank.

On May 24, 1906, Simopoulos submitted to the Parliament a bill, article 31 of which provided for the establishment in Athens of a school for the education of civil servants of various branches. According to the bill, the condition for enrollment in this school would be the possession of a high school diploma while the students would pay tuition. The school would have four departments, tax, treasury, customs and administration and the graduates would be appointed to a branch of the respective department. Ultimately the bill was not passed by the Parliament.
