= Zeebo Inc. =

American consumer electronics company

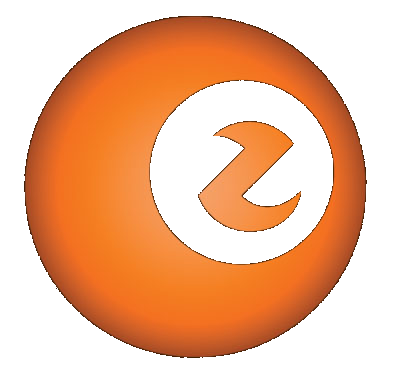
- Type: Private
- Industry: Consumer electronics
- Founded: 2007
- Defunct: 2014
- Headquarters: San Diego, California, United States
- Area served: Worldwide
- Key people: Mike Yuen (CEO)
- Products: Zeebo System
- Website: Archived homepage

Zeebo Inc. was an American consumer electronics company and creator of the Zeebo entertainment and education system. Designed for "emerging markets" in countries such as Brazil, Mexico, India and China, the Zeebo system (or "Zeebo") runs videogames and other interactive content delivered via wireless 3G digital distribution. This approach is intended to thwart piracy and reduce the cost of content. The system also enables wireless Internet access for web browsing, email and social networking. The Zeebo was sold throughout Brazil and Mexico, and the company has discussed the possibility of future product introductions elsewhere in the Americas, in India, China and Russia.

== Founding ==
By the company's own account, the initial idea for the Zeebo system occurred independently to Reinaldo Normand, who was then at Tectoy Mobile (a division of the Brazilian consumer electronics company Tectoy), and Mike Yuen, senior director of games and services at Qualcomm. Normand sought backers for the project in the United States, and helped form a small U.S.-based division of Tectoy, called Tectoy of America, in 2007. He then met Yuen, and the two discovered that they were pursuing similar concepts. During that time Mike Yuen was working with Dave Durnil, Director of Engineering at Qualcomm who designed and built the first working prototype of a 3G wireless gaming and entertainment console. Qualcomm decided to fund the project, and Tectoy of America became Zeebo Inc. in March, 2008. Normand joined the executive staff and was given responsibility for worldwide special projects. Dave Durnil became an engineering advisor for Zeebo Inc. Yuen left Qualcomm and was named Zeebo's senior vice president of content and services in August, 2009. He served as president and CEO.

== Product launch ==
The company introduced the Zeebo in limited quantities in Rio de Janeiro, Brazil, on June 1, 2009, with manufacturing and distribution provided by Tectoy. The system went on sale nationwide in Brazil in November the same year. In December, 2009, the Zeebo went on sale nationwide in Mexico.

== Organization and partnerships ==
Zeebo Inc. had its headquarters in San Diego, California with offices in São Paulo, Brazil, Mexico City, Mexico and Shanghai, China. Zeebo marketing and development in Brazil were carried out by Zeebo Brasil, Zeebo Inc.'s Brazilian subsidiary. Marketing and development in Mexico was carried out by the Mexican subsidiary Zeebo Mexico.

Manufacturing and distribution were provided by regional partners such as Tectoy in Brazil. Wireless bandwidth was provided by telecommunications partners such as Claro in Brazil and Telcel in Mexico. Zeebo also announced an agreement with AT&T in March, 2010. The company has stated that "The agreement gives us access to AT&T's international roaming network, allowing us to carry out rapid trials of the Zeebo platform in new geographic areas as we establish longer-term agreements with local carriers for deployment of the system. It will also give us a chance to explore opportunities in the US market in the future."

In June, 2010, it was reported that Zeebo Inc. raised $13.5 million in its latest round of venture funding.
