= Zeebo =

Home video game console

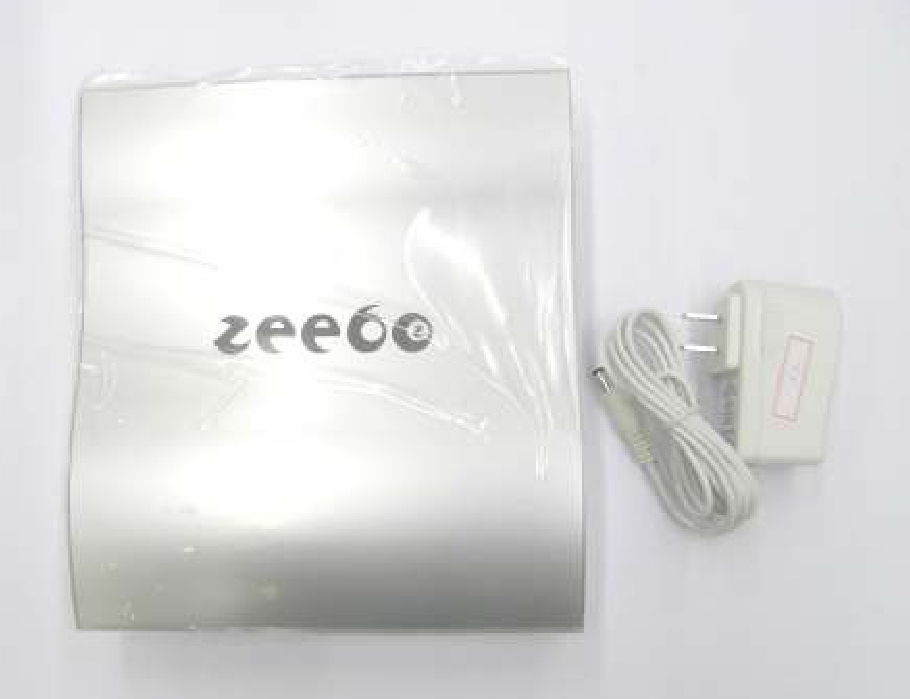
- A Zeebo console wrapped in plastic and its power connector
- Manufacturer: Zeebo Inc.
- Product family: Zeebo
- Type: Home video game console
- Generation: Seventh
- Released: BRA: May 25, 2009; MEX: November 14, 2009
- Lifespan: 2009–2011
- Introductory price: R$ 499,00
- Discontinued: September 30, 2011
- Media: Digital distribution
- CPU: ARM11 based system on chip clocked at 528Mhz
- Storage: 1 GB NAND flash
- Display: PAL-M/NTSC composite video out, 640x480
- Graphics: ATI Imageon
- Controller input: 6-button dual analog gamepad
- Connectivity: 1 SD card slot; 3 USB 2.0 ports; 3G HSUPA; 2.5G EDGE; 2G GPRS
- Online services: ZeeboNet on Claro 3G (Brazil); Telcel (Mexico)

The Zeebo is a discontinued home entertainment and education system from Zeebo Inc. It enabled users to play video games, and also connect to the Internet using its 3G modem, communicate online and run educational applications. The Zeebo was targeted at developing markets such as Brazil and Mexico.

Zeebo was founded by Reinaldo Normand in 2008, based on a working prototype developed by Dave Durnil and business plan by Mike Yuen at Qualcomm. The company's stated intention was to create an affordable console with inexpensive games and educational content delivered via wireless digital distribution to circumvent piracy. The Zeebo does not use DVDs or cartridges; games and other content are downloaded wirelessly over broadband cellular networks. In addition to games, the Zeebo system also provides Internet connectivity, enabling users to access educational and information content, communicate via e-mail and do social networking (this capability was supported in Brazil and Mexico).

Before its discontinuation, Zeebo had attracted content from companies such as Disney Interactive Studios, Namco, Capcom, Sega, Activision, 3D Realms, id Software, Gameloft, Electronic Arts,, Digital Chocolate, Fishlabs, Gamevil, Glu, Polarbit, Popcap,, THQ, G-Mode, Flying Tiger, Limbic Software, Twelve Interactive, and Vega Mobile.

== History ==
The Zeebo was first announced in a press conference on November 12, 2008 in São Paulo, Brazil. A blog post on the company's Brazilian website explained that the console would come with three games pre-loaded, with three additional games available for free download. Ten additional games would be available at launch, starting at R$10 (2009) (US$5). The company planned a limited release in the first quarter of 2009 in a single Brazilian city, which had not yet been selected. This would be followed by a nationwide release, with a library of 50 games, by Children's Day in October.

On March 23, 2009, the Zeebo console was presented at the Game Developers Conference in San Francisco. John F. Rizzo, CEO of Zeebo, characterized the product as the "video game console for the next billion," emphasizing the goal of targeting emerging markets in India, China, Brazil and Eastern Europe. Zeebo was expected to launch in Brazil the following month, for US$199 (R$399 in 2009), followed by other countries later in the year at US$179. Rizzo argued that the Zeebo was not intended to directly compete with contemporary leading consoles, but to appeal to markets where older systems like the Sega Mega Drive were still popular.

The console was released on May 25, 2009, in limited quantities in Rio de Janeiro, with a suggested retail price of R$499 (2009) (US$249.57). In September, the price was cut to R$399, and the price was reduced again in November to R$299 (US$150). The console was distributed nationwide in Brazil in December 2009. By August 2010, there were approximately 40 games launched for Zeebo in Brazil. On September 1, 2010, Zeebo announced that it was adding new capabilities and accessories to the Zeebo in Brazil, including Internet connectivity, a keyboard and new more ergonomic gamepad. The new Brazilian system configuration was priced identically to the previous one: R$299 (US$150). The company announced that Brazilian owners of previous system configurations can upgrade to the new one for free.

The Zeebo was launched in Mexico in November 2009. It shipped to national retailers across the country on November 4, 2009, with a suggested price of 2,499 Mexican pesos (approximately US$185). The Mexican system configuration was similar to that introduced in September 2010 and includes Internet connectivity, a keyboard and ergonomic gamepad. The price was cut to 2249 pesos (US$178) in April 2010.

The Zeebo was available in Brazil and Mexico. Reports indicated that the Zeebo was planned to become available in China by 2011. A release in Russia had also been planned.

Zeebo Inc. announced an agreement with AT&T in March 2010, allowing the Zeebo console to connect to AT&T's mobile broadband service. John F. Rizzo, Zeebo president and CEO, expressed optimism that the deal would help the company quickly expand into new and emerging markets. The announcement also mentioned future "commercial opportunities" in the US market.

On May 27, 2011, Zeebo announced its end of operations in Brazil and Mexico. According to the company, all games would undergo a price reduction and Zeebonet 3G would remain active until September 30, and all warranty services would be honored. On the same day, on ZeeboNet 3G, a message was added to the details of the game Turma da Mônica em Vamos Brincar ("Monica's Gang in Let's Play"), stating that the game would be unavailable for purchase by the end of the day.

Zeebo's home page still stated that the company was "currently working on a next generation Android-based platform for launch in 2012" but the product had not been released.

== Wireless capabilities ==
The Zeebo system was developed by Zeebo Inc. with the participation of 12 companies, mainly Qualcomm and Tectoy. It was manufactured and distributed by local partners in target countries (e.g., Tectoy in Brazil). The console uses a Qualcomm BREW mobile gaming chipset similar to that in mobile phones. Players are able to buy and download games and other content wirelessly through 3G or EDGE. The user was always connected to the wireless network without any subscription fee. Purchases are made through an online store using a virtual currency, Z-Credits. Zeebo's gaming delivery system reduces costs (with no discs or cartridges needed) and overcomes piracy barriers – two elements that have hindered sales of game consoles in developing markets. Z-Credits are purchased by bank transfer, credit card, bank debit or prepaid cards. Games cost from about 500 to 2500 credits.

The console's wireless connectivity also allows users to browse web sites, send and receive e-mail and take part social networking activities via the wireless network. The Zeebo can also perform "over-the-air" (OTA) updates to the console's firmware—delivering new content, features and bug fixes.

== Accessories ==
=== Z-Pad ===
The standard Zeebo "Z-Pad" controller includes a total of 7 buttons, a D-Pad and two analog sticks. On the right side, there are four buttons (numbered 1–4); two shoulder buttons rest on the top, called ZL and ZR; at the center, there is a "Home" button, which takes the user back the start screen of the Zeebo interface, while functioning as a typical "Pause" button during games. Directly below this button are the two analog sticks, whereas the D-Pad is located at the leftmost side.

=== Boomerang ===
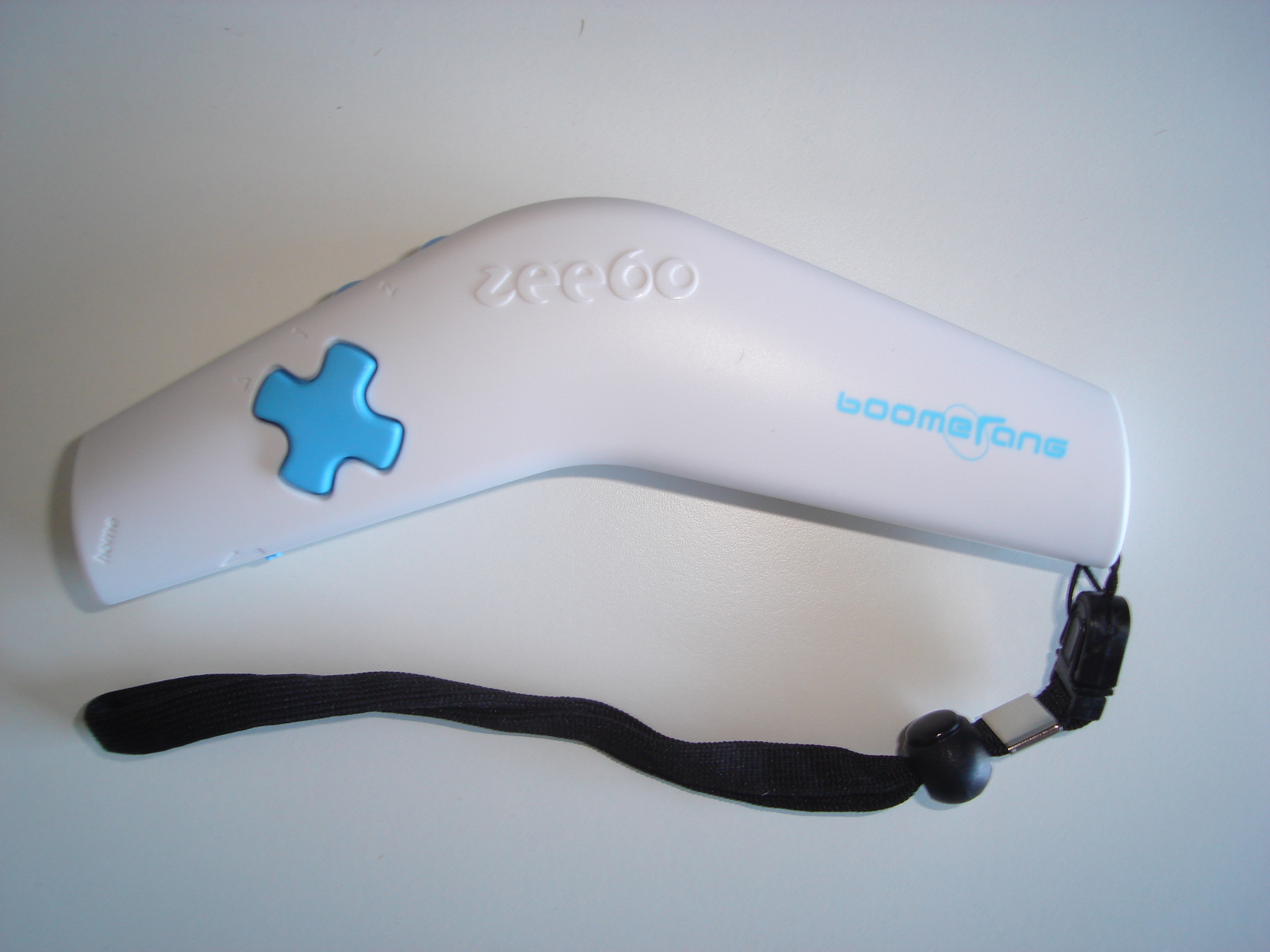
Official Boomerang controller for Zeebo

The Boomerang, sold by Tectoy in Brazil, is a wireless controller with a built-in accelerometer, using motion-sensing technology to play games with actual physical gestures. It has a D-Pad, two buttons (labeled 1–2) on the top-left side, a "Home" button, a sliding on-off switch and a wrist strap. It requires two AA batteries as a power supply.

=== Keyboard ===
The Zeebo also includes an external keyboard, used with the system's web-browsing, email and social networking functions.

== Games ==
The Zeebo features remade versions of games from mobile phones and other consoles, such as FIFA 09, Resident Evil 4, Crash Bandicoot Nitro Kart 3D, Galaxy on Fire and Rally Master Pro. There are also a number of original game titles developed specifically for the Zeebo, including “Zeebo Extreme” racing games, "Boomerang Sports" games, Zeebo "Football Club" games and Un Juego de Huevos (known as Um Jogo de Ovos in Brazil), an action-adventure game based on the hit Mexican animated film Una película de huevos from Huevocartoon. In March 2010, Zeebo began releasing a series of classic arcade games. These games were originally created in the 1980s and 1990s by Data East Corp. in Japan and have been modified to run on the Zeebo system. The titles include Caveman Ninja (originally known as Joe & Mac), Spinmaster, Super Burger Time and Dark Seal (also known as Gate of Doom). Ports of games such as Sonic Adventure and Street Fighter Alpha were also announced, but were ultimately never released.

In June 2010, in advance of the World Cup, Zeebo released the first of its Football Club ("F.C") titles, Zeebo F.C. Foot Camp, developed by Zeebo Interactive Studios in Brazil. It includes four mini-games, each emphasizing a particular soccer skill, such as dribbling, juggling and goal-kicking. Along with Zeebo F.C. Foot Camp, the company released Zeeboids, an application that enables users to create personal characters ("avatars") to be used with the Football Club games. Also in June, Zeebo announced a variety of forthcoming games from independent developers such as Digital Chocolate, Fishlabs, Limbic Software, Twelve Interactive and Vega Mobile.

In Brazil, the Zeebo was sold with three free games embedded – FIFA 09, Need for Speed Carbon: Own the City and Brain Challenge (known in Portuguese as "Treino Cerebral"). Three other games, all in Portuguese, are available for free download with new systems: Prey Evil, Zeebo Extreme Rolimã and Zeebo Extreme Jetboard. More 30 other titles are available for purchase (via Z-Credits) and download.

On September 1, 2010, Zeebo announced a number of new games and educational applications to be launched in 2010 and 2011. They included a new Zeebo Football Club game, called Zeebo F.C. Super League; a duo of titles from Disney Interactive Studios, including Disney All Star Cards and Alice in Wonderland; and a series of titles based on the popular Monica's Gang ("Turma da Monica") comic books in Brazil from cartoonist Mauricio de Sousa.

In Mexico, the console includes five free embedded game titles (Crash Bandicoot Nitro Kart 3D, Pac Mania, Tekken 2, Zenonia and Zeebo Family Pack). More than a dozen games were available for wireless purchase at the time of the Mexican launch in November 2009. More than a dozen more have since been introduced, all in Spanish. Zeebo has also announced that the English language teaching company Interlingua will be developing entertainment and education applications for the console.

In addition to games and educational content, the console provides access to more than 50 web sites, grouped in subject categories, called "Z-Channels."

== Development ==
Content for the Zeebo is based on the BREW platform and is created using the Zeebo SDK, downloadable from the Zeebo Inc. website. Gamepad peripherals are made possible by a BREW extension. The Zeebo system supports OpenGL ES 1.0/1.1. Applications are downloaded wirelessly over-the-air and commonly range in size from 5–25MB, though games content could be as large as 50MB on device. After the release, some titles were known to consume more than 50MB on its internal storage. For such titles, most had its assets already preloaded from factory, being the download/purchase comprised just of the license and the main data. A known example is the game Need for Speed Carbon: Own the City, using more than 100 MB of the device's storage.

== Technical specifications ==
- Processor: ARM11 / QDSP-5 in Qualcomm MSM7201A SoC running at 528 MHz
- Graphics Processor: ATI Imageon, later renamed to Adreno
- Internal memory

- ROM: 1 GB eNAND FlashNAND Flash
- RAM: 160 MB (128 MB DDR SDRAM in MCP + 32 MB stacked DDR SDRAM in MSM7201A)

- Video-out Resolution: VGA (640×480) – 4:3 aspect ratio
- Network: 3G (HSUPA), scaling back to 2.5G (EDGE) or 2G (GPRS) where necessary)
- I/O Connectors:

- 3 USB 2.0 Standard A (Accessories)
- 1 USB 2.0 OTG – Mini B (intended for service centers and developers only)
- 1 RCA connector (Video Composite TV Signal, x2 Stereo Audio)
- 1 SD card Slot/Interface

- Power: AC adapter 5V 3A
- Power consumption: 15 Watt max. 1 watt standard.
- Graphics:

- Polygon performance: 1.6 million triangles per second
- 3D pixel fill rate (textured): 63 million polygons (2 textures)

- Audio: 8 channels simultaneous MP3, ADPCM, MIDI
- Size: W × D × H – 157 × 215.4 × 44 mm
- Weight: Less than 0.9 kg (2 lb)
- Operating System: Qualcomm BREW
