= Tectoy =

Brazilian toy and electronics company

Tec Toy S.A.
- Trade name: Tectoy (1997–present)
- Type: Private
- Industry: Toys, Video games, Electronics
- Founded: September 1987; 39 years ago
- Headquarters: São Paulo, Brazil; New York, United States
- Key people: Daniel Dazcal; Stefano Arnhold; Fernando Fischer Pereira
- Products: Master System, Mega Drive, Game Gear, Saturn, Dreamcast, Zeebo
- Website: tectoy.com.br

Tec Toy S.A., trading as Tectoy since 1997, is a Brazilian toy and electronics company headquartered in São Paulo. It is best known for producing, publishing, and distributing Sega consoles and video games in Brazil. The company was founded by Daniel Dazcal, Leo Kryss, and Abe Kryss in 1987 because Dazcal saw an opportunity to develop a market for electronic toys and video games, product categories that competitors did not sell in Brazil at the time. The company stock is traded on the Bovespa.

Soon after its founding, Tectoy completed a licensing agreement with Sega allowing it to market a laser gun game based on the Japanese anime Zillion, which sold more units in Brazil than in Japan. Tectoy would later bring the Master System and Mega Drive to the region, as well as Sega's later video game consoles and the Sega Meganet service. Other products developed by Tectoy include educational toys such as the Pense Bem, karaoke machines, and original Master System and Mega Drive games released exclusively in Brazil, such as Férias Frustradas do Pica-Pau and Portuguese translations and alternate versions of video games. Over its history, Tectoy has diversified to include more electronic products, such as DVD and Blu-ray players and the Zeebo console. While successful at times, the company has also undergone debt restructuring in 2000 and actions to consolidate its two public stock offerings into one.

Tectoy is credited with the continued success of Sega consoles in Brazil far past their lifetimes worldwide. At one point, Tectoy held an 80% market share of video games in Brazil. Tectoy continues to produce "plug and play" dedicated consoles modelled after the Master System and Genesis to this day, which continue to rival more modern systems by Microsoft, Nintendo and Sony in popularity. Tectoy has sold 8 million Master System variants and 3 million Mega Drive variants.

== History ==
=== Formation and early years (1987–1996) ===
Tectoy was founded in September 1987 by Daniel Dazcal, Leo Kryss, and Abe Kryss. Dazcal was previously associated with Sharp Corporation in Brazil, while the Kryss brothers were the owners of Evadin, a Brazilian TV manufacturer associated with Mitsubishi. The new startup company sought to create "intelligent toys" designed specifically for the Brazilian market. At the time, Brazil's most dominant toy manufacturer was Estrela, which held 55% of the market share but did not have any interest in electronics. This gave Dazcal an area to focus the new company. In order to give the company an advantage in marketing costs, Tectoy set its factory in the Free Economic Zone of Manaus to leverage tax incentives.

One of the primary goals of the founders of the company was to enter the video game market. Relying on individual previous experiences in working with Japanese companies, Tectoy executives reached out to Sega, which initially showed reluctance to partner with Tectoy given the failure of Tonka in merchandising Sega products in the United States. The company slowly built trust with Sega and was ultimately granted total liberty to manage Sega products in the Brazilian market. The first Sega product released by Tectoy was the Zillion infrared laser tag gun, based on the phaser featured in the anime of the same name. The success of Zillion led Sega to have Tectoy distribute its 8-bit video game console, the Master System, in Brazil as well. Launched officially in Brazil in September 1989, the Master System achieved success. Tectoy's revenue in 1989 was US$66 million, of which $40 million was attributed to the console. Some of this success is attributed to the company's strong advertising investments: the launch campaign, which lasted until Christmas 1989, was at an expense of $2 million. By the end of 1990, the Master System install base in Brazil was about 280,000 units. The company also introduced a telephone service with tips for games, created a Master System club, and presented the program Master Tips during commercial breaks of the television show Sessão Aventura of Rede Globo.

Over a year after the launch of the Master System, Tectoy officially brought Sega's 16-bit console, the Mega Drive, to Brazil in December 1990. Sega's handheld console, Game Gear, was later released in August 1991. Like the Master System, the two products were assembled by Tectoy in Manaus, and Game Gear was the first portable console manufactured in Brazil. Sega's primary competition, Nintendo, did not officially arrive in Brazil until 1993; they entered the region through Playtronic, a partnership between Gradiente and Estrela. By the time Nintendo arrived in the region, they were unable to compete with pirated NES systems already available in the region and Tectoy's established following. Mega Drive surpassed the SNES in market share in Brazil, and Tectoy claimed 80% of the local video game market. By 1996, Tectoy had sold 2 million video game consoles and was receiving 50,000 calls a month to their video game tip line.

On May 26, 1994, Dazcal died at the age of 42. He was replaced as CEO by Stefano Arnhold, who had worked for Dazcal at Sharp and became one of Tectoy's earliest employees in December 1987. Arnhold continued Tectoy's partnership with Sega and released the Sega Saturn on August 30, 1995, at a price of R$899.99. According to contemporary reporting by Ação Games, Tectoy distributed an initial shipment of 700 Saturn consoles to major Brazilian cities on the launch date. The console was bundled with Virtua Fighter, while Daytona USA, Panzer Dragoon, Worldwide Soccer and Clockwork Knight were offered separately at prices ranging from R$60 to R$70. Additional controllers cost approximately R$40. Tectoy also announced plans to release around 15 further Saturn games by December 1995. With the increase in the number of commercial Internet users in Brazil, Tectoy also invested in content and Internet access by introducing a Brazilian version of Internet service provider CompuServe, at the time the second largest US subscriber. São Paulo, Rio de Janeiro, and Belo Horizonte were the first cities to receive the service. The service officially began in April 1997 and was part of a strategy to diversify the company's interests away from being a seasonal industry.

=== Debt restructuring and changes in focus (1997–2006) ===
In 1997, Tectoy saw financial losses of R$35.9 million and saw a 32% drop in revenue compared to 1996, a year in which the company also failed to meet its revenue goal. Despite the difficulties facing Sega's console business, Tectoy continued promoting new releases across multiple Sega platforms in Brazil during 1997. In January 1998, Ação Games reported that Tectoy had promised approximately a dozen Saturn games for the preceding Christmas season, including Sonic R, Duke Nukem 3D, Last Bronx, Worldwide Soccer '98, Enemy Zero and Sega Touring Car Championship. The company also continued supporting Sega's older hardware, with Sonic Blast for the Master System and International Superstar Soccer Deluxe for the Mega Drive. Planned PC releases included Daytona USA Deluxe and Manx TT Super Bike. The company managed to reduce its losses in 1998, but still saw a net loss of R$10.8 million. During this period, the company launched the Dreamcast console in Brazil in September 1999 at a price of R$900. To cut costs, the Brazilian version was released without a pack-in game and a modem for Internet connection. The modem would be released months later at a price of R$49.99. As of July 2000, Dreamcast sold about 20,000 units in Brazil.

Tectoy's second logo, 2001 to 2007

By 2000, Tectoy had debts of R$55 million. The difficulties presented by the market caused Tectoy to announce its application for debt restructuring on December 9, 1997. At the time, the reasons disclosed to the press were the drop in sales and interest in Tectoy's products. The arrangement caused a number of Tectoy businesses to be restructured. CompuServe, which had opened the previous year in Brazil, was closed on April 25, 1998. Subscribers had the option of migrating to the competitor Universo Online (UOL). At the time of the closure, Arnhold stated that although the internet market was "promising", the company had not reached the number of subscribers that the company was expecting. As part of the debt restructuring, Tectoy renegotiated the debt up to six years for repayment, moved its factory in Manaus to smaller facilities, simplified its production chain, and cut its number of employees from 1000 to 110. In Tectoy's offices in São Paulo, all employees were centralized to one location. Tectoy also narrowed its focus to video games and its new work on karaoke machines. The company became the first in Brazil to use compact discs as media for its karaoke devices, in contrast to the cartridge-based machines of its only domestic competitor, Raf Electronics. With these restructuring changes, Tectoy was able to reduce its annual costs to R$4 million in 2001, half of what it spent in 1997, and bankruptcy procedures closed on October 4, 2000.

After the end of bankruptcy proceedings, Tectoy announced another change to its focus. The company announced its diversification from focusing solely on toys and video games into an "entertainment company". Tectoy intended to introduce more product lines, including DVD players, with a focus on higher profitability and less seasonality to the business. The company's video game business remained strong during this time; the year 2000 saw Tectoy make a 25% increase in sales of its Mega Drive console as compared to 1999. While a 2% sales decrease occurred in 2001 due to power rationing in Brazil, the company aimed for another 25% increase of its video game business the next year. By the year 2002, Tectoy had sold 1.2 million Mega Drives in Brazil, and aimed to produce another 100,000 units. Part of the continued success of the Mega Drive came from Tectoy's partnership with Brazilian television station SBT to release a game based on Show do Milhão, a popular game show. The game's release increased sales of the Mega Drive console by 20%.

=== Diversification and Zeebo (2006–2010) ===
Tectoy's third logo from 2007 to 2020.

In May 2007, Fernando Fischer became the company's president. He promised to reverse the R$3 million loss from the previous year, and increase revenue by R$45 million. At the same time, the company began using the name "Tectoy" as one word instead of two, and introduced a new logo. Tectoy set forth four business areas of focus in the digital entertainment field: video games, DVDs, digital TV receivers, and toys. One of the first new products was a mobile TV digital receiver, MobTV, in December 2007. During the previous year, Tectoy entered the gaming market for mobile devices. Branded as a subsidiary called Tec Toy Mobile, the company partnered with Level Up! Games, responsible for games like the MMORPG Ragnarok Online. The partnership between the two companies ended in the second half of 2010, when Tectoy sold its stake in Level Up!. Tectoy also began importing the Nabaztag, a portable rabbit-shaped electronic device that played music and accessed information over Wi-Fi. A fire occurred in the Tectoy factory in Manaus in November 2008, which temporarily paralyzed the production lines of the company. In February 2009, Tectoy launched the first Blu-ray player manufactured in Brazil. Subsequently, neither the digital TV receiver nor the Blu-ray player have been financially successful.

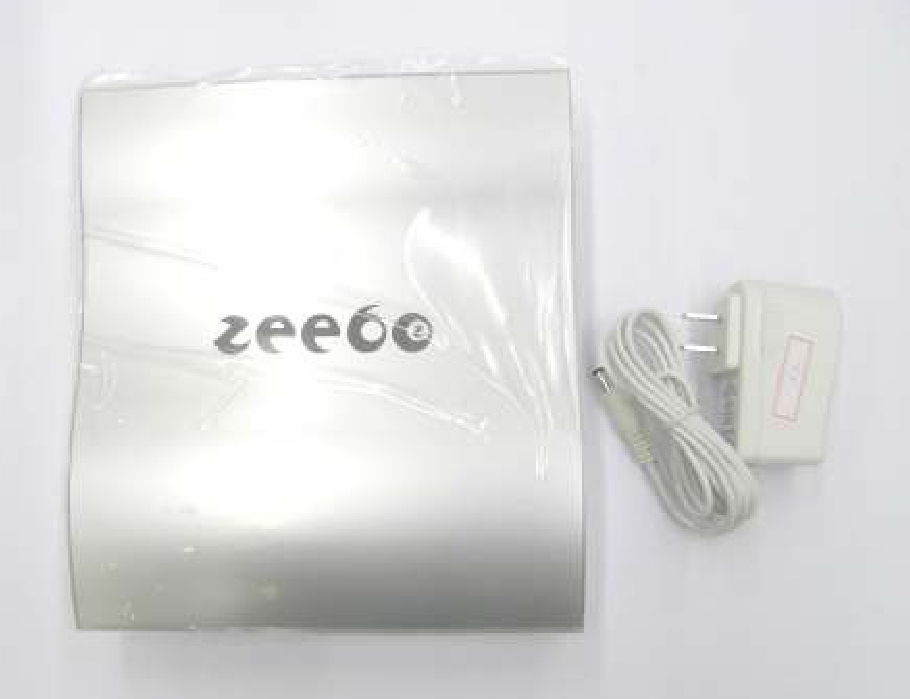
Tectoy partnered with Qualcomm to release the Zeebo in 2009

Tectoy announced a partnership with Qualcomm in 2008 for a new project, the Zeebo. Known by the codename "Jeanie", the project was originally announced as a "digital toy" that would talk to "several existing technologies." The new digital platform was publicly released at the end of the year as a new video game console dedicated to emerging markets, with no physical media and low price to minimize piracy. Zeebo was released in Brazil on May 25, 2009, but faced competition from Sony and its PlayStation 2 console, which originally sold at R$799. In turn, the Zeebo was not well received by consumers, selling only 30,000 units rather than the company's projection of 600,000. Fischer stated that Tectoy would be operating at a profit if it had not invested in and launched Zeebo. Faced with this scenario of losses, the Zeebo was discontinued in Brazil in 2011. The game purchase network, ZeeboNet, was shut down on September 30, 2011.

=== Further diversification and stock actions (2010–present) ===
For a short time starting in November 2010, Tectoy produced and marketed 14-inch tube TVs with 12 games included in memory. This production came at a time when LCD and plasma screen manufacturers accounted for 70% of production in the Free Economic Zone of Manaus. Faced with the success of outsourced set-top boxes for the South Korean company Humax, which produced them for Sky, Tectoy executives saw the possibility of using the company's factory in Manaus for third-party products. This, the company reasoned, would be especially helpful to those who wanted to enter the Brazilian market without investing in their own structure. Tectoy's workforce rose from 200 to 400 employees as a result of the partnership with Humax, which began on December 16, 2010. The company's partnership with Humax ended in the second quarter of 2013.

In the wake of higher revenues obtained in early 2011, Tectoy attempted to auction preferred and common shares. While the company expected to gain R$9.6 million from the sale, a lack of market interest prevented the sale from happening. Tectoy continued to invest in new categories and licensing in digital electronics. Tablets were a major part of the company's revenue in 2013, accounting for 37% of revenue between January and September, with the expectation of surpassing DVD players and becoming their main product category. In 2012, Tectoy licensed Disney characters to launch a new product, the Magic Tablet. The company's shares were grouped in 2015. Tectoy was forced to carry out the procedure after actions of BM&F Bovespa against penny stocks.

A strategy of the company has been betting on nostalgia to bring back consoles that were sold in the 1980s and 1990s. In March 2017, Tectoy released the Atari Flashback 7, a version of the Atari 2600, with 101 games in memory but without support to insert game cartridges. Additionally, by June of the same year, it was planned to relaunch the Mega Drive, with some additional features such as a microSD card slot. As of the end of 2015, Tectoy was still selling plug and play Master System derivatives. By 2016, the company had sold 8 million of these systems in Brazil.

== Products ==
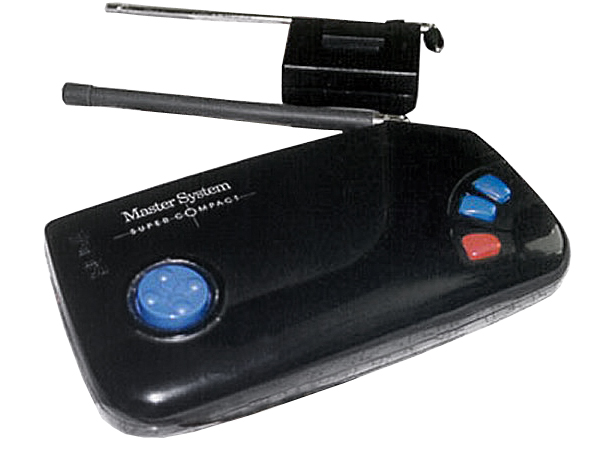
Master System Super Compact, a Master System variant exclusively released by Tectoy in Brazil

Tectoy is known for their handling and distribution of Sega consoles in Brazil. The company has sold all of Sega's consoles since 1987, including the Master System, Mega Drive, 32X, Sega CD, Game Gear, Saturn, Sega Pico, and Dreamcast, in addition to the Zillion laser tag gun. The company also introduced the Sega Meganet service to Brazil in 1995, starting with a focus on e-mail but later expanding to online multiplayer and chat by 1996, as well as partnering with Brazilian bank Bradesco to develop a banking system, similar to Japan's connection with Nagoya Bank. As of 2015, the Master System and Mega Drive combined sold around 150,000 a year, a level comparable to more modern consoles available in Brazil such as the PlayStation 4, despite the Mega Drive being temporarily discontinued and reintroduced. Tectoy's hardware for the Master System and Mega Drive evolved over time into derivatives targeting the low-income market. These consoles generally do not have the cartridge slots, as games are installed directly on its internal memory. One of these consoles is the Mega Drive Portable, a portable Mega Drive with 20 games installed onto its memory. Other variations exclusive to Tectoy's releases include the Master System Super Compact, which is a wireless system that transmits to a television, and the Master System Girl, a version of the Super Compact in a pink shell. In 2006, Tectoy released the Master System 3 Collection and the Mega Drive 3, including 120 and 71 built-in games, respectively. Tectoy has received and considered requests to remake the original Master System.

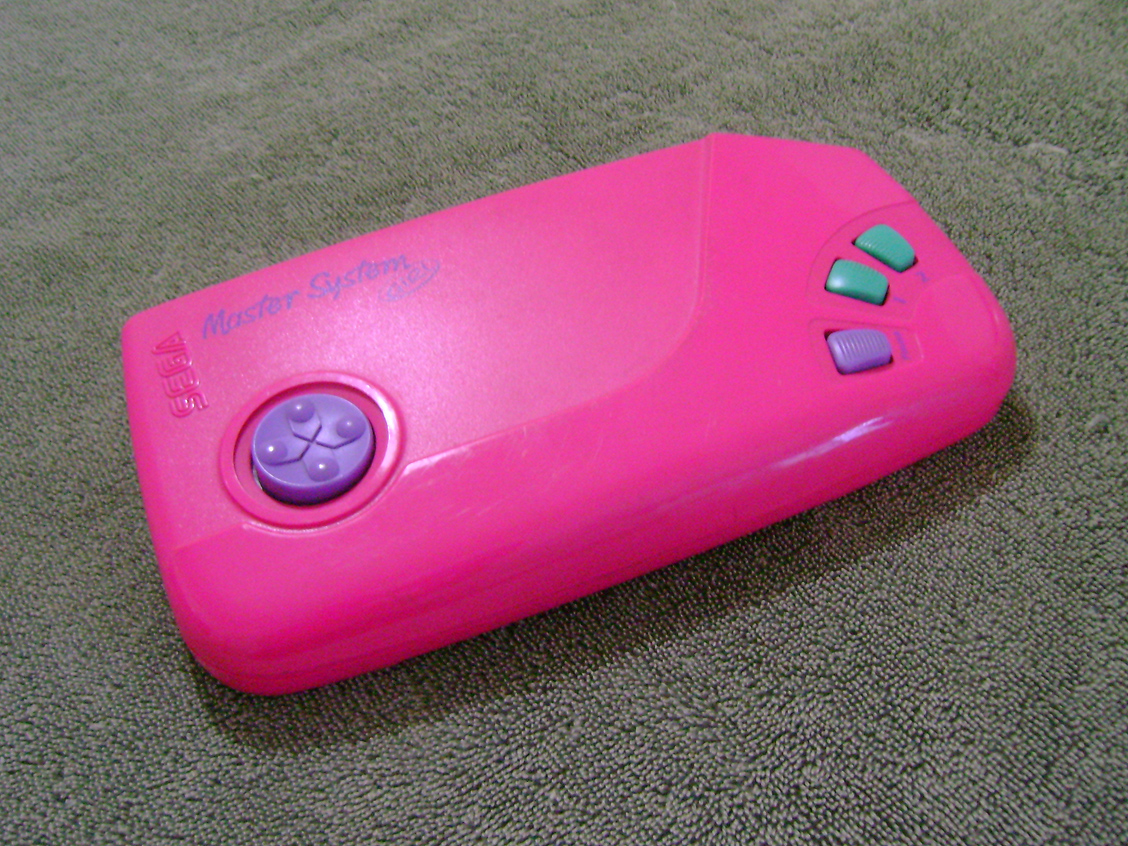
Master System Girl, a pink-colored variant of the Master System Super Compact

In the 1990s, Tectoy translated several games published by Sega into Portuguese. Translated games include the first three Phantasy Star games, Shining in the Darkness, and Riven, the last of which also incorporated dubbed voices. Additionally, Tectoy built relationships with other developers, including Capcom, Acclaim Entertainment, Electronic Arts, and Midway Games. Tectoy would then translate titles from these developers into Portuguese for release in Brazil, and to tie in to popular Brazilian entertainment franchises. Some examples of this include: Teddy Boy became Geraldinho, certain Wonder Boy titles became Monica's Gang games, and Ghost House became Chapolim vs. Dracula: Um Duelo Assustador, based on Mexican TV series El Chapulín Colorado. Additionally, Tectoy ported games for their Sega systems, such as Street Fighter II: Champion Edition for the Master System and Duke Nukem 3D for the Mega Drive, as well as various games ported from the Game Gear to the more popular Master System. Aside from porting, the company developed Férias Frustradas do Pica-Pau after finding out that Woody Woodpecker was the most popular cartoon on Brazilian television. These titles were developed in-house by Tectoy in Brazil. Tectoy also suggested the development of Ayrton Senna's Super Monaco GP II, a project that Sega accepted but would be the only suggestion from Tectoy that Sega approved. More recently, Tectoy created two Mega Drive games based on Show do Milhão, a Brazilian game show based on the Who Wants to Be a Millionaire? format, and Mega Drive 4 Guitar Idol, a 16-bit rhythm video game based on Guitar Hero with its own guitar peripheral. Tectoy had been granted a master license by Sega for all of their games, including those developed in Europe or America, and had permission to sell any game by Sega in Brazil.

Aside from its work with Sega, Tectoy has developed and sold karaoke machines, set-top boxes, televisions pre-installed with games, mobile games, DVD players, Blu-ray players, a mobile TV receiver, the Nabaztag music player, and the Zeebo video game console. Tectoy also distributed PC games in Brazil such as Blade Runner, StarCraft, and Daytona USA. A successful electronic toy of the company was the Pense Bem, a toy computer introduced in 1988 that asked questions to kids on geography and history. Another product, the Teddy Ruxpin, is a teddy bear that moves and tells stories, licensed by Tectoy for release in Brazil. The Magic Star, a plastic singing toy based on a character from Monica's Gang, was popular in the 1980s and later was rereleased in 2013. Other toys include the Mr. Show electronic question and answer game, as well as Sapo Xulé, a frog doll wearing sneakers, and toys developed for Senninha, a comic based on Ayrton Senna. More recently, Tectoy has also entered the infant care market, partnering with Fisher-Price on baby monitors and with Disney on air purifiers and toothbrush sterilizers.
