= List of Need for Speed video games =

The Need for Speed video game series is published by Electronic Arts. Games in the series were primarily developed by Canadian developer EA Canada from 1992 to 2001. They were later primarily developed by Canadian developer EA Black Box for a period of the series' history from 2002 to 2011. After a stint with several game developers (including Swedish developer Ghost Games) from 2013 through 2019, the series is currently being handled by British developer Criterion Games, whose latest title Need for Speed Unbound was released in 2022.

The series debuted with The Need for Speed in North America, Japan (under the Over Drivin' title through High Stakes), and Europe in 1994. Need for Speed is a series of racing video games where the main objective is to win races in a variety of game modes, in the process eluding traffic and police. Aftermarket customization of video game vehicles was an aspect first introduced by the Need for Speed series after the release of the film, The Fast and the Furious; the feature was included in every Need for Speed title developed by EA Black Box from Need for Speed: Underground through Need for Speed: Undercover.

The NFS series is among the best-selling video game franchises with 150 million copies sold. Electronic Arts considers one of the reasons the series has remained so popular is because "the series has long been an ever-evolving franchise, one that changes up its focus, mechanics and style every couple of years".

== Primary installments ==
Game	Details
The Need for Speed Original release date(s): NA: August 31, 1994; JP: December 9, 1994; EU: March 20, 1996	Release years by system: 1994 – 3DO; 1995 – MS-DOS; 1996 – PlayStation, Saturn
The Need for Speed Original release date(s): NA: August 31, 1994; JP: December 9, 1994; EU: March 20, 1996	Notes: Developed by Pioneer Studios, a team within EA Canada.; A special edition of the game was released later in North America in 1996 for PC.; The game was released in Japan as Over Drivin' DX.
Need for Speed II Original release date(s): NA: March 31, 1997; EU: May 1997; JP: July 3, 1997	Release years by system: 1997 – Windows, PlayStation
Need for Speed II Original release date(s): NA: March 31, 1997; EU: May 1997; JP: July 3, 1997	Notes: Developed by EA Canada.; A special edition of the game developed by EA Canada and EA Seattle was released on November 6, 1997 in North America for PC.; The game was produced in Japan as Over Drivin' II.
Need for Speed III: Hot Pursuit Original release date(s): NA: March 25, 1998; EU: April 1998; JP: September 23, 1998	Release years by system: 1998 – Windows, PlayStation
Need for Speed III: Hot Pursuit Original release date(s): NA: March 25, 1998; EU: April 1998; JP: September 23, 1998	Notes: Developed by EA Canada and EA Seattle.; The game was released in Japan as Over Drivin' III: Hot Pursuit.
Need for Speed: High Stakes Original release date(s): NA: March 1, 1999; JP: June 17, 1999; EU: March 30, 1999	Release years by system: 1999 – Windows, PlayStation
Need for Speed: High Stakes Original release date(s): NA: March 1, 1999; JP: June 17, 1999; EU: March 30, 1999	Notes: Developed by EA Canada and EA Seattle.; The game was released in Japan as Over Drivin' IV.; The game was released in Brazil as Road Challenge.; First game to feature a damage model.
Need for Speed: Porsche Unleashed Original release date(s): NA: February 29, 2000; EU: June 29, 2000	Release years by system: 2000 – Windows, PlayStation, 2004 – Game Boy Advance
Need for Speed: Porsche Unleashed Original release date(s): NA: February 29, 2000; EU: June 29, 2000	Notes: Windows version developed by EA Canada, PlayStation version developed by Eden Games, and Game Boy Advance adaptation developed by Pocketeers.; Also known as Need for Speed: Porsche 2000 in Europe, and Need for Speed: Porsche in Germany and Latin America.; Last game in the saga to be released for a fifth-generation console.
Need for Speed: Hot Pursuit 2 Original release date(s): NA: October 2, 2002; EU: October 25, 2002	Release years by system: 2002 – GameCube, PlayStation 2, Windows, Xbox
Need for Speed: Hot Pursuit 2 Original release date(s): NA: October 2, 2002; EU: October 25, 2002	Notes: PlayStation 2 version developed by EA Black Box, and other versions by EA Seattle.; First game in the series to be released for the major sixth generation consoles.
Need for Speed: Underground Original release date(s): NA: November 17, 2003; EU: November 21, 2003; JP: December 25, 2003	Release years by system: 2003 – Game Boy Advance, GameCube, Windows, PlayStation 2, Xbox; 2005 – Arcade
Need for Speed: Underground Original release date(s): NA: November 17, 2003; EU: November 21, 2003; JP: December 25, 2003	Notes: Developed by EA Black Box.; First game to take place in a named city; previous titles took place across multiple different tracks.
Need for Speed: Underground 2 Original release date(s): NA: November 15, 2004; EU: November 19, 2004; JP: December 22, 2004; AU: July 27, 2005	Release years by system: 2004 – Game Boy Advance, GameCube, Mobile, Nintendo DS, Windows, PlayStation 2, Xbox
Need for Speed: Underground 2 Original release date(s): NA: November 15, 2004; EU: November 19, 2004; JP: December 22, 2004; AU: July 27, 2005	Notes: Developed by EA Canada and EA Black Box.
Need for Speed: Most Wanted Original release date(s): NA: November 15, 2005; EU: November 24, 2005; AU: November 25, 2005; JP: December 22, 2005	Release years by system: 2005 – Game Boy Advance, GameCube, Mobile Nintendo DS, Windows, PlayStation 2, PlayStation Portable, Xbox, Xbox 360
Need for Speed: Most Wanted Original release date(s): NA: November 15, 2005; EU: November 24, 2005; AU: November 25, 2005; JP: December 22, 2005	Notes: Developed by EA Canada and EA Black Box.; First game in the series to be released for the Xbox 360.
Need for Speed: Carbon Original release date(s): NA: October 31, 2006; EU: November 3, 2006; JP: December 21, 2006; AU: December 26, 2006	Release years by system: 2006 – GameCube, Mobile Windows / Mac OS X, PlayStation 2, PlayStation 3, PlayStation Portable, Wii, Xbox 360
Need for Speed: Carbon Original release date(s): NA: October 31, 2006; EU: November 3, 2006; JP: December 21, 2006; AU: December 26, 2006	Notes: Developed by EA Canada and EA Black Box.; Last game in the series to be released for the GameCube, Xbox, and Game Boy Advance; first game to be released for the Wii and PlayStation 3.; To date, the only one released for Mac OS X.
Need for Speed: ProStreet Original release date(s): NA: November 14, 2007; AU: November 22, 2007; EU: November 23, 2007; JP: January 31, 2008	Release years by system: 2007 – Mobile, Windows, Nintendo DS, PlayStation 2, PlayStation 3, PlayStation Portable, Wii, Xbox 360
Need for Speed: ProStreet Original release date(s): NA: November 14, 2007; AU: November 22, 2007; EU: November 23, 2007; JP: January 31, 2008	Notes: Developed by EA Black Box.
Need for Speed: Undercover Original release date(s): NA: November 18, 2008; EU: November 21, 2008; JP: December 18, 2008	Release years by system: 2008 – Xbox 360, PlayStation 3, Wii, PlayStation 2, Nintendo DS, PlayStation Portable, Windows, Mobile
Need for Speed: Undercover Original release date(s): NA: November 18, 2008; EU: November 21, 2008; JP: December 18, 2008	Notes: Developed by EA Black Box, Exient Entertainment, and Firebrand Games.; Last game in the series to be released for a sixth generation console.; First to be released for iOS.
Need for Speed: Shift Original release date(s): NA: September 15, 2009; AU: September 15, 2009; EU: September 17, 2009; UK: September 18, 2009; JP: November 12, 2009	Release years by system: 2009 – Xbox 360, PlayStation 3, PlayStation Portable, Windows, Mobile
Need for Speed: Shift Original release date(s): NA: September 15, 2009; AU: September 15, 2009; EU: September 17, 2009; UK: September 18, 2009; JP: November 12, 2009	Notes: Developed by Slightly Mad Studios and EA Bright Light.; Last game in the series to be released for the PlayStation Portable.
Need for Speed: Nitro Original release date(s): NA: November 3, 2009; EU: November 6, 2009	Release years by system: 2009 – Wii, Nintendo DS
Need for Speed: Nitro Original release date(s): NA: November 3, 2009; EU: November 6, 2009	Notes: Developed by Firebrand Games and EA Montreal.; Nintendo platform exclusive.; Another version, titled Nitro-X, was released for the Nintendo DSi on November 15, 2010 in North America, and November 26 in Europe.
Need for Speed: World Original release date(s): NA: July 27, 2010; EU: July 27, 2010; AU: July 27, 2010	Release years by system: 2010 – Windows
Need for Speed: World Original release date(s): NA: July 27, 2010; EU: July 27, 2010; AU: July 27, 2010	Notes: Developed by EA Singapore.; The only PC exclusive Need for Speed to date.
Need for Speed: Hot Pursuit (2010) Original release date(s): NA: November 16, 2010; EU: November 19, 2010	Release years by system: 2010 – Xbox 360, PlayStation 3, Windows, Wii
Need for Speed: Hot Pursuit (2010) Original release date(s): NA: November 16, 2010; EU: November 19, 2010	Notes: Developed by Criterion Games.; Wii version was developed by Exient Entertainment.
Shift 2: Unleashed Original release date(s): NA: March 29, 2011; EU: March 31, 2011	Release years by system: 2011 – Xbox 360, PlayStation 3, Windows
Shift 2: Unleashed Original release date(s): NA: March 29, 2011; EU: March 31, 2011	Notes: Developed by Slightly Mad Studios.
Need for Speed: The Run Original release date(s): NA: November 15, 2011; EU: November 18, 2011	Release years by system: 2011 – Xbox 360, PlayStation 3, Windows, Wii, Nintendo 3DS
Need for Speed: The Run Original release date(s): NA: November 15, 2011; EU: November 18, 2011	Notes: Developed by EA Black Box.; Last Need for Speed made by Black Box Studios.
Need for Speed: Most Wanted (2012) Original release date(s): NA: October 30, 2012; EU: November 1, 2012	Release years by system: 2012 – Xbox 360, PlayStation 3, Windows, PlayStation Vita, Android, iOS; 2013 – Wii U
Need for Speed: Most Wanted (2012) Original release date(s): NA: October 30, 2012; EU: November 1, 2012	Notes: Developed by Criterion Games as their last mainline title; they would do additional work for the next title, Rivals.; To date, the only game released for the PlayStation Vita.
Need for Speed Rivals Original release date(s): NA: November 15, 2013; EU: November 21, 2013	Release years by system: 2013 – Windows, PlayStation 3, PlayStation 4, Xbox 360, Xbox One
Need for Speed Rivals Original release date(s): NA: November 15, 2013; EU: November 21, 2013	Notes: Developed by Ghost Games and Criterion Games, the latter providing additional work.; The eighth generation versions were released simultaneously with the seventh generation versions; last game in the series to be released for seventh generation consoles and the first game to be released for eighth generation of consoles.
Need for Speed: No Limits Original release date(s): WW: September 30, 2015	Release years by system: 2015 – iOS, Android
Need for Speed: No Limits Original release date(s): WW: September 30, 2015	Notes: Developed by Firemonkey Studios.
Need for Speed (2015) Original release date(s): NA: November 3, 2015; EU: November 5, 2015	Release years by system: 2015 – Windows, PlayStation 4, Xbox One
Need for Speed (2015) Original release date(s): NA: November 3, 2015; EU: November 5, 2015	Notes: Developed by Ghost Games.; Reboot of the series.
Need for Speed Payback Original release date(s): WW: November 10, 2017	Release years by system: 2017 – Windows, PlayStation 4, Xbox One
Need for Speed Payback Original release date(s): WW: November 10, 2017	Notes: Developed by Ghost Games.
Need for Speed Heat Original release date(s): WW: November 8, 2019	Release years by system: 2019 – Windows, PlayStation 4, Xbox One
Need for Speed Heat Original release date(s): WW: November 8, 2019	Notes: Developed by Ghost Games as their last Need for Speed title.; Last game developed by Ghost Games before being downgraded to a support studio under its original name of EA Gothenburg.; Last game released for the eighth generation of consoles.
Need for Speed Unbound Original release date(s): WW: December 2, 2022	Release years by system: 2022 – Windows, PlayStation 5, Xbox Series X and S
Need for Speed Unbound Original release date(s): WW: December 2, 2022	Notes: First mainline Need for Speed game developed by Criterion Games after 2012's Most Wanted reboot; their last work for a game in the franchise was 2013's Rivals.; First game released for the ninth generation of consoles.

== Other games ==
Game	Details
Nissan Presents: Over Drivin' GT-R Original release date(s): JP: December 20, 1996	Release years by system: 1996 – Sega Saturn
Nissan Presents: Over Drivin' GT-R Original release date(s): JP: December 20, 1996	Notes: Localised Japanese retail release of Road & Track presents: The Need for Speed for the Sega Saturn featuring only Nissan vehicles, including various generations of models such as Skyline GT-R and Fairlady Z.
Nissan Presents: Over Drivin' Skyline Memorial Original release date(s): JP: February 10, 1997	Release years by system: 1997 – PlayStation
Nissan Presents: Over Drivin' Skyline Memorial Original release date(s): JP: February 10, 1997	Notes: Localised Japanese retail release of Road & Track presents: The Need for Speed for the PlayStation featuring various generations of the Nissan Skyline.
Need for Speed: V-Rally Original release date(s): NA: September 30, 1997	Release years by system: 1997 – PlayStation, 1999—Game Boy Color, Nintendo 64, PC (Windows)
Need for Speed: V-Rally Original release date(s): NA: September 30, 1997	Notes: First entry in the standalone V-Rally series, the game was originally produced by European based company Eden Studios. However, Electronic Arts bought the publishing rights to the game and distributed it in North America under the Need for Speed banner.
Need for Speed: V-Rally 2 Original release date(s): NA: October 31, 1999; EU: 1999; JP: January 27, 2000	Release years by system: 1999 – PlayStation, 2000—Dreamcast, PC (Windows)
Need for Speed: V-Rally 2 Original release date(s): NA: October 31, 1999; EU: 1999; JP: January 27, 2000	Notes: V-Rally 2: Championship Edition is the second entry in the standalone V-Rally series, produced by Eden Studios. As with the first game, Electronic Arts bought the publishing rights and distributed it in North America under the Need for Speed banner. Later, Infogrames would publish the game in North America for the Dreamcast under the Test Drive banner. It was the last entry in the V-Rally series to be marketed in North America under a third-party racing franchise's name.
Motor City Online Original release date(s): NA: October 29, 2001	Release years by system: 2001 – PC (Windows)
Motor City Online Original release date(s): NA: October 29, 2001	Notes: The game runs on a modified engine used for High Stakes on PC and was originally produced as Need for Speed: Motor City, but was disassociated from the Need for Speed name after being stripped from its single player campaign and turned into a MMO, online-only experience.
Need for Speed: Edge Original release date(s): Beta: December 10, 2017; WW: cancelled	Release years by system: 2017 open beta – PC (Windows),
Need for Speed: Edge Original release date(s): Beta: December 10, 2017; WW: cancelled	Notes: Based on the 2013 title Need for Speed Rivals.
Need for Speed: Hot Pursuit Remastered Original release date(s): WW: November 6, 2020	Release years by system: 2020 – Xbox One, PlayStation 4, Windows, Nintendo Switch
Need for Speed: Hot Pursuit Remastered Original release date(s): WW: November 6, 2020	Notes: Developed by Stellar Entertainment.; Remaster of Criterion Games' Need for Speed: Hot Pursuit.

== See also ==
- Need for Speed
- Electronic Arts
- Ghost Games
