= Need for Speed Unbound =

2022 racing video game

- Cover art featuring A$AP Rocky's modified Mercedes-Benz 190E 2.5-16
- Developer: Criterion Games
- Publisher: Electronic Arts
- Director: Kieran Crimmins
- Producer: Danny Isaac
- Designer: Bill Lane
- Programmers: Alex Bailey; Richard Geldard
- Artist: Darren White
- Writer: Kristen McGorry
- Composer: Brodinski
- Series: Need for Speed
- Engine: Frostbite
- Platforms: PlayStation 5; Windows; Xbox Series X/S; Amazon Luna
- Release: Windows, Xbox Series X/S, PlayStation 5: WW: December 2, 2022; Amazon Luna: WW: June 12, 2025
- Genre: Racing
- Modes: Single-player, multiplayer

Need for Speed Unbound (stylised as NFS Unbound) is a 2022 racing video game developed by Criterion Games and published by Electronic Arts. It was released for PlayStation 5, Windows, and Xbox Series X/S on December 2, 2022. An Amazon Luna port was released on June 12, 2025. Unbound is the twenty-fifth instalment in the Need for Speed series, and the successor to 2019's Heat which additionally commemorates the series' 30th anniversary. It is the first game in the series to be developed by Criterion since 2013's Rivals (a collaboration with then-lead studio Ghost Games) and the studio's first as the main developer of the series since 2012's Most Wanted.

Unbound features an art style that merges artistic elements like cel-shading and graffiti art with the more realistic art style of other Need for Speed games. The game takes place in the fictional "Lakeshore City", which is inspired by Chicago, Illinois.

Upon release, the console versions received generally positive reviews from critics, while reviews for the PC version were more mixed. Critics praised the artstyle, gameplay, and customization, while criticism focused on the lack of innovation and story. Though Unbound's overall reception was an improvement over that of the recent Ghost Games-developed titles, retail sales were down 64% compared to its predecessor. As of 2026, Unbound is the most recent Need for Speed installment to be released, as EA has since shifted Criterion's focus to the Battlefield franchise, leaving the franchise dormant.

== Gameplay ==
Need for Speed Unbound is a racing game set in a fictional city called Lakeshore City, which is based on Chicago. It features an open world environment and gameplay similar to that of previous entries in the series, being mainly focused around street racing. The game features various forms of customization such as installing various body kits, adding a splitter, and even completely removing the front or rear bumpers. Leaning into the street art-inspired aesthetic of the game, Need for Speed Unbound features a set of driving effects which may be changed at will by the player. Post-launch updates introduced the ability to disable them entirely.

Two types of events in Unbound include races and takeovers, the latter hosted by A$AP Rocky. Numerous types of races are available that take place throughout Lakeshore. Takeovers, a new type of event, require the player to beat the scores of three other racers by chaining numerous actions to win; they can be practiced during the morning. The "heat system" from Heat returns in Unbound, where the player attempts to gain notoriety among the police. After partaking in an event, whether it be day or night, the player's heat will increase, and sometimes right after completing an event, a pursuit will occur. Getting caught, whether it be stopping close to an LCPD unit, being immobilized, or damaging the car beyond repair, results in their session ending and their bank being lost. One change made to the gameplay loop was the replacement of Need for Speed Heat's separate day/night cycles with a weekly cycle, with the player's earnings in both day and night races being banked in upon returning to the garage. When playing the story mode, the end of these weeks will feature a special event.

Cars may be purchased and sold directly from the hideout, removing the requirement to go to a dealership on the map. A car's performance may be improved by installing better parts or by swapping its engine outright. New to Unbound is a handling slider which may be tweaked to favor drifting or grip. Drivetrain and chassis parts may be installed to allow further adjustments to this slider. Nitrous is handled differently in this title, returning to the system used in Need for Speed Payback with an extra "burst" nitrous being made available by performing certain actions. While the game retains Heat's performance ratings, Unbound divides performance into five segments, ranging from a "B" to an "S". Events are tied to these, restricting them to cars around a specific performance rating. Excluding custom cars, the game launched with 143 different cars from 32 manufacturers, expanding to 157 cars from 35 different manufacturers with post-launch updates. While the selection is largely the same as Heat's, Audi was not present at launch, returning in post-launch updates. The Porsche Taycan's addition in Volume 4 reintroduced electric vehicles to the series after the Tesla Roadster was last featured in Need for Speed: Most Wanted (2012); the BMW S1000RR's addition in Volume 9 made it the first playable motorcycle in the series.

Like Heat's neon flamingos, Unbound's open world features collectibles in the form of bears hidden around Lakeshore City. Street graffiti, long jumps, drift zones, speed traps, and smashable billboards make a return from the previous title, with speed zones returning after appearing in Payback, and will reward the player with collectibles once completed. The player's progression in multiplayer is completely separate from the offline story mode and features "playlists" with specific events tied to a specific performance level. The multiplayer mode features a "Speed Pass", which the game's downloadable content revolves around.

== Plot ==
In Lakeshore City, the player (female player voiced by Elizabeth Grullon, male player voiced by Ian Nelson) and their friend and partner Jasmine/Yaz (portrayed by Ashleigh LaThrop) refurbish an old junker car in their mechanic shop owned by their mentor Rydell (Dwayne Barnes). After winning a couple of street races, Yaz has a disagreement with Rydell over a car and grows tired of being stuck in the same job daily, and wishes to do something better. She tells the player she was contacted by her friend in the foster system, Alec about some jobs involving delivering vehicles, challenging the authority of the city's police force under the control of Mayor Morgan Stevenson (voiced by Debra Wilson).

One night after a couple of races, the player completes a delivery mission but doesn't find anyone at the drop-off point, and Yaz and Rydell don't answer their calls. Instead, the alarm goes off at Rydell's Rydes. In a hurry and assuming the worst, the Player races back to Rydell's Rydes to witness it being raided of all the cars Rydell was working on. Confronted by both Rydell and the Player, Yaz denies being involved but drives off with the car after Rydell accuses her of theft and expresses his disappointment.

Two years later, street racing in Lakeshore has declined, and Rydell's Rydes has been struggling to remain open after the incident. The player makes a living driving people, one of whom is Tess (Jennifer Sun Bell), whom the player goes with to a street race meet-up, later helping her escape from cops. Yaz suddenly shows up and the player discovers that she is part of the crew that stole the rides and is responsible for the resurgence of street racing in Lakeshore. She announces The Grand, a huge street race where the winner will receive a large amount of money. After hearing the player's story and being introduced to Rydell, Tess proposes bankrolling the garage and rides as well as guiding the player in their efforts to qualify and get revenge on Yaz and win the car back, in return for making money betting on and against them. The player then does several deliveries for Tess, many of which they are suspicious of but don't question due to the money.

After winning the first week's qualifier, the player confronts and challenges Yaz to the pink slip in The Grand. Tess records the interaction and ensures that Yaz accepts the condition of relinquishing the car on the final race, and the video goes viral. After the end of the second qualifier, the player again confronts Yaz, and Tess then reveals the truth: she's been making money betting on and against the player, but for Alec. All of the deliveries the player had done earlier were on his behalf, using her as the middleman. Tess informs both of them that Alec wants to cut a deal with all three where neither the player nor Yaz wins but both will be paid handsomely for throwing the race. Outraged, Yaz leaves to confront Alec. Disgusted with Tess's actions, the player cuts ties with her.

Yaz visits the garage afterward, where she confirms to the player what Tess said was true, but she didn't want to accept the conditions and came to warn Rydell and the player. Reconciling for the moment, Yaz proposes relieving Alec of all his car collection, which he acquired illegally through Tess and the player, including the ones stolen from Rydell's garage, and delivering them to their rightful owners. She mentions that the player still has to defeat her in the Grand to win back the car. The player finally wins The Grand and gets back their car. Tess reveals she was never working for Alec but was just making money off whatever bets and races she could get her hands on, and now that they won, he is ruined and thanks the player for the money. The player and Yaz drive back to the garage, where Yaz reconciles with Rydell. Now all together again, they prepare for more adventures to come.

== Development and release ==
In February 2020, it was announced that the development of future Need for Speed games would return to Criterion Games from Ghost Games, as the studio was referred back to EA Gothenburg. Criterion Games previously worked on Hot Pursuit (2010) and Most Wanted (2012). The game was originally going to be scheduled to be released in late 2021, but it was pushed back to late 2022 as the team was temporarily reassigned to assist the development of Battlefield 2042. In May 2022, EA announced that they had merged Codemasters Cheshire into Criterion Games, creating a larger team to work on the game.

A few days prior to the reveal, fans noticed that EA had accidentally revealed the name of their upcoming Need for Speed title early on their website. Additionally, fans also noticed that promotional images of the game had been released early on the Japanese retailer Neowing's website. Unbound was formally revealed on October 6, 2022, in a trailer featuring music by rapper A$AP Rocky and AWGE. The trailer showcased the game's "street art" art style. EA stated that the game would receive free post-launch updates.

Unbound also received a special collaborative deluxe release with UK-based streetwear and lifestyle brand Palace. At an additional cost to the base game, NFS Unbound Palace Edition includes various branded bonuses, including four cars with Palace liveries and 20 items of Palace-branded clothing for the player's in-game character to wear.

Need for Speed Unbound had an early access release for its Palace Edition on November 29, 2022, with EA Play members (including Xbox Game Pass Ultimate members) being able to try it for ten hours and EA Play Pro members having unlimited early access. The game was released on December 2, 2022.

=== Post-launch and future ===
Unbound would receive nine content updates, referred to as "volumes", during its post-release tenure. Its final content update, "Volume 9: Lockdown", released on 25 November 2024, adding drivable motorbikes for the first time in the franchise with the BMW S1000RR.

In February 2025, Battlefield series director Vince Zampella announced that Criterion's and EA's Need for Speed team had joined development on the next entry in the first-person shooter series, Battlefield 6, effectively ending further development on more content for Unbound, although he also reaffirmed that the Need for Speed series would return.

On June 12, 2025, the game was made available on Amazon Luna.

== Reception ==
Reception

Aggregate score
Aggregator	Score
Metacritic	PC: 73/100; PS5: 77/100; XSXS: 77/100

Review scores
Publication	Score
Digital Trends	3.5/5
Eurogamer	Recommended
Game Informer	8.5/10
GameSpot	7/10
GamesRadar+	4/5
Hardcore Gamer	4/5
HobbyConsolas	78/100
IGN	7/10
PC Gamer (US)	76/100
Push Square	8/10
Shacknews	6/10
GamePro (DE)	83/100

Need for Speed Unbound received "generally favorable" reviews from critics for the PS5 and Xbox Series X/S versions, while the PC version received "mixed or average" reviews, according to review aggregator website Metacritic.

During the 26th Annual D.I.C.E. Awards, the Academy of Interactive Arts & Sciences nominated Need for Speed Unbound for "Racing Game of the Year".

Unbound was the 17th-best-selling retail game in the United Kingdom in its week of release. Sales of the game were down 64% when compared with its predecessor Need for Speed Heat.
