= Grand Prix Unlimited =

1992 video game

Road & Track Presents: Grand Prix Unlimited
- Developer: Accolade
- Publisher: Accolade
- Platform: DOS
- Release: April 1992
- Genre: Sim racing

Grand Prix Unlimited is a 1992 Formula One video game published by Accolade. The game was licensed by Road & Track magazine.

== Gameplay ==
Grand Prix Unlimited is a game in which five car setups are featured - Williams-Renault, McLaren-Honda, Ferrari, Tyrrell and Benetton-Ford - with 21 Formula One circuit tracks. The player can choose a practice session or a single race, or to compete in the World Championship. The game includes named drivers and a course designer to customize races for the player. The game also allow the player to modify the car's attributes, as well as the weather conditions on the track. The game has five levels of difficulty.

== Reception ==
Reception

Review score
Publication	Score
Aktueller Software Markt	6/10

Wallace Poulter reviewed the game for Computer Gaming World, and stated that "Road & Track Presents Grand Prix Unlimited is an extremely frustrating product. There is a gem of a design waiting to be discovered yet this excellent design work has been compromised by the implementation."

Clayton Walnum for Compute! said that despite the game's bad sound effects, "Grand Prix Unlimited is a solid – albeit not groundbreaking – racing simulation."

== See also ==
- The Need for Speed, another Road & Track licensed game
