= Need for Speed Heat =

2019 racing video game developed by Ghost Games

- Cover art featuring a modified Polestar 1 being chased by a Chevrolet Corvette Grand Sport police car
- Developer: Ghost Games (Note: Criterion Games took over post-launch development in February 2020.)
- Publisher: Electronic Arts
- Director: Riley Cooper
- Designer: Yoni Rabinowitz
- Programmer: Nicolas Mercier
- Artist: Darren White
- Writer: Philip Huxley
- Composer: Pedro Bromfman
- Series: Need for Speed
- Engine: Frostbite 3
- Platforms: PlayStation 4; Windows; Xbox One
- Release: November 8, 2019
- Genre: Racing
- Modes: Single-player, multiplayer

Need for Speed Heat (stylised as NFS Heat) is a 2019 racing video game developed by Ghost Games and published by Electronic Arts for PlayStation 4, Windows, and Xbox One. It is the twenty-fourth installment in the Need for Speed series and commemorates the series' 25th anniversary. Set in Palm City, a fictionalised version of Miami, Florida, the game's single-player campaign revolves around the player character partaking in the "Speedhunters Showdown", an exhibition held in the city that promotes legal street racing, while getting involved with siblings Lucas and Ana Rivera as they interact with the city's police force, led by authority figure Lt. Frank Mercer.

Heat received mixed reviews from critics, who mostly found the game to be an improvement over the 2015 reboot and Payback, but not enough to be a full return-to-form for the franchise. It would be Ghost Games' final entry; both for the Need for Speed franchise, and as a head studio. In February 2020, EA shifted development of the franchise back to Criterion Games (the developers of the Hot Pursuit and Most Wanted revivals). Ghost Games would be reverted to their previous name of EA Gothenburg, and became an engineering studio for the Frostbite engine.

Heat would be succeeded by Need for Speed Unbound, which was released in December 2022.

== Gameplay ==
Need for Speed Heat is a racing game set in an open world environment called Palm City, a fictionalised version of Miami, Florida, and its surrounding areas. However, the in-game map features diverse geography, including mountainous areas, dense forests, and open fields. The game can be played offline, which features a single-player storyline. Unlike Need for Speed Payback, the game does not include a 24-hour day-night cycle, but players can switch between day and night. During the day, players can take part in sanctioned race events, which reward players with cash to spend on new cars and upgrades. During the night, players can take part in illicit street racing, which rewards REP. Players can smash neon flamingos hidden within the map, which rewards them with a small amount of money or rep depending on the time of day. They can also find graffiti, referred to as "Street Art" in the game, and send it to the livery editor to use it on their cars. Lastly, they can complete activities around the open world such as smashing billboards, beating scores on drift zones, getting the highest speeds passing through speed traps, and going the longest distances when performing long jumps. Players may complete "Crew Time Trials" which allows them to complete short timed events in an attempt to get the #1 spot on the leaderboard in their crew.

Racing during the night will attract the attention of a rogue police task force that patrols the streets of Palm City, who are tasked with shutting down street racing in the city, which can lead players to risk their earned rep against the police or lose their earnings in handcuffs. Pursuits in Palm City can take place during day or night, but the PCPD's response to a pursuit differs depending on the time period. Additionally, their response will increase the higher the heat level, with faster cars, spike strips, roadblocks, killswitches, helicopters, and armored vehicles appearing in higher levels. Players earn rep from participating in pursuits, with greater amounts offered during night than day. Each heat level also equates to the amount a player's earned rep for a current night session will be multiplied by, should they successfully reach a safehouse or garage. The player is busted when the driver stops and is close to a PCPD unit for a certain amount of time, is completely immobilised during a pursuit, or has depleted their strength bar. Players busted by the PCPD will not have an impound strike applied to their vehicle or any other form of marks that would result in them losing their vehicle, unlike the system used in Need for Speed: Most Wanted (2005). Being busted will reward the player with any rep they have earned during the current night session, but will not be multiplied based on their heat level. They will also have to pay a fine using bank and have their current night session consequently concluded.

The game features 127 cars from 33 manufacturers, with Ferrari returning after being absent from Payback due to licensing issues. The ability to swap engines from other cars has been added, which increase the car's performance. After criticism of Payback's upgrade system, which revolved around loot boxes, EA revealed those would not be included in the game; they are unlocked by earning REP and winning races. The only pieces of downloadable content that was released for the game was a time saver pack, which reveals collectibles on the map, and the McLaren F1 as a downloadable car.

Ahead of the game's release, Electronic Arts released the NFS Heat Studio app for iOS and Android devices. Users can collect and customise their cars which can be imported into the main game upon release. The app would eventually be retired and removed from the iOS and Android app stores.

The game added feature support for cross-platform play starting in June 2020 as part of the game's final patch.

== Plot ==
The player (male player voiced by Andrew Lawrence, female player voiced by Jamie Gray Hyder) (Note: Lawrence also provided his likeness for the player's Caucasian male character model and did the player's full-body motion capture. Hyder also provided her likeness for the player's Caucasian female character model.) arrives in Palm City for the SpeedHunters Showdown, a citywide exhibition that draws in racers who compete in sanctioned races throughout the day, and illegal street races at night. Lt. Frank Mercer (Josh Coxx), leader of the police's High-Speed Task Force, announces his intent to arrest all street racers in the city. The player buys their first car from Lucas Rivera (Jonny Cruz), a local mechanic and former street racer, who also helps the player enter their first Showdown race, and becomes their mentor. Lucas' younger sister, Ana Rivera (Ana Marte), is a street racer whose crew recently disbanded after the task force nearly killed one of her friends.

Ana introduces the player to The League, a crew of Palm City's best street racers, which Lucas almost joined until he quit racing after their father suddenly died. Ana and the player form a new crew to vie for a place in The League. After a race, Ana and the player are confronted by Officer Shaw (Josh Collins) of Mercer's task force, who impounds Ana's Nissan 350Z.

After another race, they witness Shaw meeting task force officer Eva Torres (Shontae Saldana). Shaw shows Torres bags of money in his car, extorted from street racers on Mercer's orders. Torres takes a bag but warns that Mercer's brashness is endangering them. Ana steals her father's 1967 Chevrolet Camaro from Lucas' shop so she can join the player in a race which Shaw interrupts. The player overturns Shaw's car, scattering the extorted money onto the street. The spectacle raises public suspicion over the task force and Lucas becomes angered at Ana for stealing and damaging their father's car.

Torres contacts Ana and the player to admit the task force is corrupt but wants Mercer taken down because he is too reckless. Torres leads them to a warehouse that acts as an illegal chop shop, stripping cars seized by the High-Speed Task Force, or preparing them to be shipped out of the city. Ana realizes her 350Z has already been processed after finding its license plate.

The player and Ana attempt to expose Mercer by crashing a Showdown event with some members from the League joining them, leading police and local media to his chop shop, but it turns out to be vacated. Ana and the player visit Lucas and find him bound and tortured by Mercer. Mercer reveals he anticipated their plan after seeing them on a secret camera in his shop. Mercer forces the player and Ana into his police car, but Lucas, having escaped his bonds, intercepts them in his father's Camaro and rams Mercer's car, leaving it severely damaged. Ana steals Mercer's laptop and escapes with Lucas and the player. At a hideout, Lucas admits to Ana that he quit street racing because he believes their father's fatal heart attack was caused by hearing about Lucas's arrest for street racing that same night.

Ana and Lucas send files from Mercer's computer to various outlets, proving his corruption and forcing him into hiding, then learn that Mercer is preparing the stolen cars in his possession for export before fleeing Palm City. As they do not know which cops are complicit or innocent, Ana and Lucas convince The League and other crews to simultaneously goad and draw as many police cars as possible to the port where the stolen cars are being loaded. Confronted by a swarm of police and street racers, Mercer attempts to escape in a BMW M3 GTR. (Note: Resembling the cover car from an earlier title in the Need for Speed series, Need for Speed: Most Wanted) The player chases and wrecks Mercer's car, leaving him for Torres, who pulls her pistol in response to his threats and is implied to have shot him.

Over a week later, Mercer is missing and presumed dead. Torres has been promoted to lead his task force, and she announces her commitment to ending street racing. Lucas reconciles with Ana and gives her the keys to their father's repaired Camaro. Now, as members of The League, the player and Ana plan to continue racing and tackle any challenges together.

== Development ==
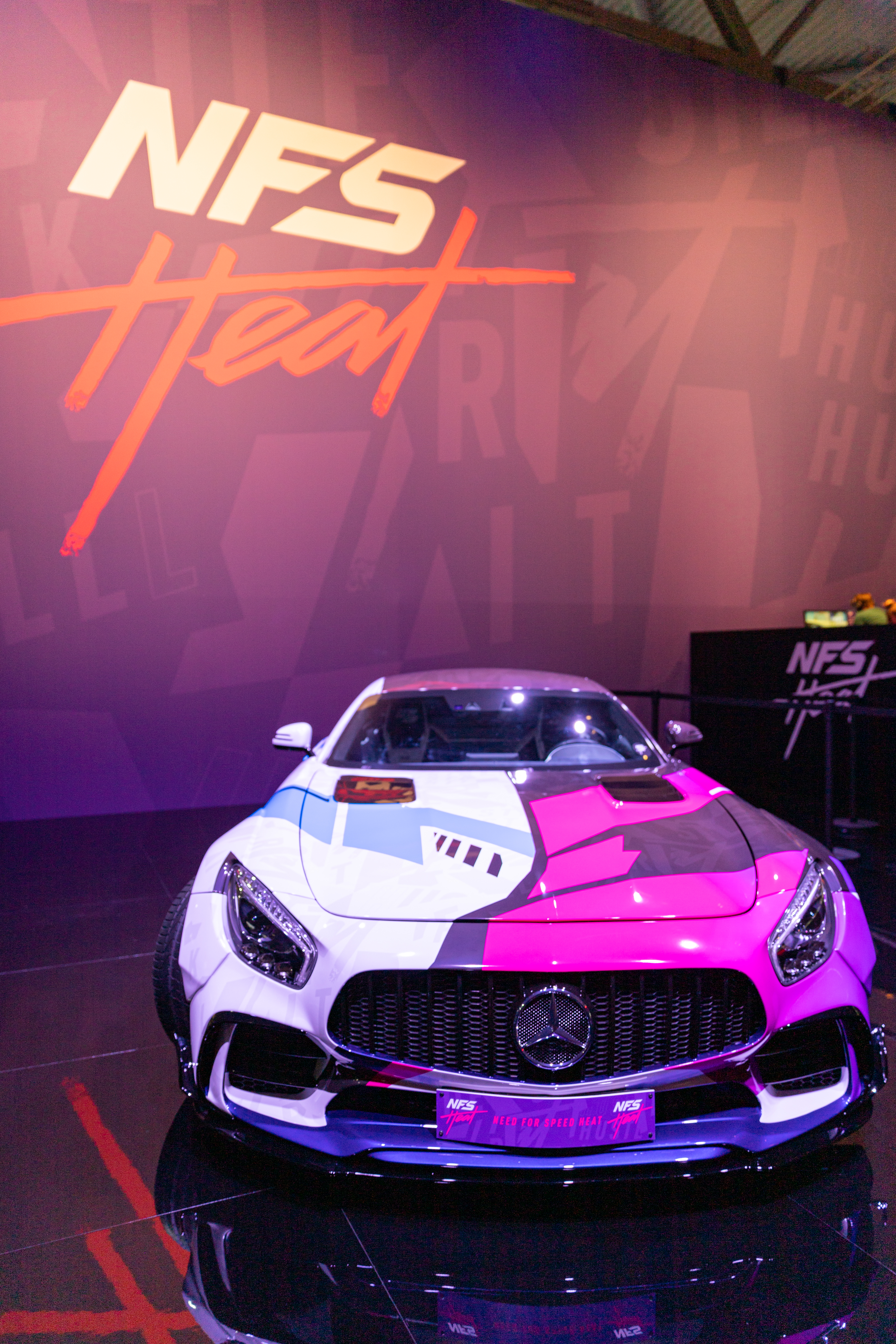
NFS Heat booth at Gamescom

The game was revealed with a trailer released on August 14, 2019, followed-up by a gameplay trailer released on August 20. It was released on November 8 the same year. The game was announced not to have lootboxes unlike its predecessor Payback, whose progression system received negative reviews. The only paid DLCs available for the game are a time saver pack and a pack that unlocks the McLaren F1. Free content updates added the Aston Martin DB11 Volante and a playable version of the Polestar 1 hero car featured on the game's cover art.

Following EA's decision to downsize developer Ghost Games, Criterion Games took over the development of the game's post-launch content. An update in June 2020 enabled cross-platform play between PC, PlayStation 4 and Xbox One, making it the first EA game to have this feature, and the first since Need for Speed: Underground in 2003.

=== Marketing ===
As part of marketing for the game, Polestar encouraged players to customize the Polestar 1, which appears in the game's cover, in the NFS Heat Studio app.

== Soundtrack ==
The musical score for Need for Speed Heat was composed by Brazilian composer Pedro Bromfman. In addition, the game features a soundtrack that comprises 58 tracks from various artists, with genres ranging from hip hop to EDM. According to EA, the game envisages "an open world of urban speed that resembles Miami" by incorporating Latin pop songs into the soundtrack.

== Reception ==
Reception

Aggregate score
Aggregator	Score
Metacritic	PC: 72/100; PS4: 72/100; XONE: 74/100

Review scores
Publication	Score
Game Informer	7.75/10
GameSpot	7/10
GamesRadar+	3.5/5
Hardcore Gamer	4/5
IGN	8/10
PC Gamer (US)	75/100
USgamer	3/5
VG247	4/5

Need for Speed Heat received generally positive reviews, according to review aggregator website Metacritic. Critics welcomed the overhauled progression system (compared to the predecessor Payback where one of the methods to gain upgrades for a car was to purchase loot boxes) and the option to choose between day and night for increased race variety, but criticized the short story and lack of innovation compared to previous titles.

Luke Reily of IGN gave the game an 8/10: "While Need for Speed Heat feels a little more like a mosaic of existing concepts rather than something especially trendsetting, Ghost has certainly scraped these ideas from some of the most-loved games in the now 25-year-old series. Heat doesn't always sizzle but it's definitely much hotter than I'd expected. This is easily the most impressive Need for Speed game in many years." Matthew Kato of Game Informer gave the game a score of 7.75/10. He stated in his review that "Need for Speed has meant different things over the years, but Heat is a good all-around representation of the franchise. The police could be a little more prominent, and the world – while well stocked – isn't as interesting as Forza Horizon’s, for instance, but NFS Heat is the best iteration since Ghost Games' reboot in 2015".

Richard Wakeling of GameSpot gave the game a 7/10, stating that "With only a select few events, no discernible difference between each car's handling, and a simplistic driving model, Need for Speed Heat does stumble into repetition during its final few hours. It's not quite a rip-roaring return to form, then, but this latest entry puts the Need for Speed series back on the right track]. The duality of its day and night events props up what would otherwise be a fairly run-of-the-mill racing game, but the renewed focus on hurtling around the track, racing wheel-to-wheel, and customizing each car in numerous ways, taps into the essence of what Need for Speed used to be about. Need for Speed Heat may not revolutionize racing games, but it's the best the series has been in a long, long time."

=== Sales ===
Need for Speed Heat reached 9th place in sales at release, though it was the fifth best selling title on the PlayStation 4.

=== Accolades ===
The game was nominated for "Best Racing Game" at the Gamescom Awards, and won the award for "Game, Franchise Racing" at the NAVGTR Awards, whereas its other nomination was for "Song Collection".
