= Motor City Online =

2001 video game

- Developer: EA Seattle
- Publisher: EA Games
- Platform: Microsoft Windows
- Release: NA: October 31, 2001
- Genre: MMOG/Racing
- Mode: Multiplayer

Motor City Online was a racing massively multiplayer online video game released by Electronic Arts on October 29, 2001. The point of the game was to buy classic cars (mostly American muscle cars) ranging from 1930s to 1970s models, tune them up, and race them against other players. The game went offline on August 29, 2003 so EA Games could focus on their current online game at the time, The Sims Online. EA, however, developed a new online racing game, called Need for Speed: World. Many fans of Motor City Online consider Need for Speed: World a spiritual successor of Motor City Online, although EA has denied any direct link between the two games.

Originally conceived as part of the Need for Speed series under the title Need for Speed: Motor City, all single player elements that may have been developed for the game were discarded in favor of an online-only model. The game featured some role-playing video game elements, such as leveling up after completing tasks (e.g. winning races), and a functional, supply and demand economy for players to get involved in.

== Reception ==
IGN gave the game a score 7.9 of out 10: "When the tumbleweeds roll through a city, you know there's something wrong."

Reception

Review scores
Publication	Score
GameSpot	7.6/10
IGN	7.9/10
The Tampa Tribune	D

GameSpot gave the game a score of 7.6 out of 10: "Motor City Online delivers on its potential, but it's most definitely not for casual online gamers or those whose patience is easily taxed".

The Tampa Tribune gave the game a score "D": " "Motor City Online" looks great and, umm ... it well looks great."

== Awards ==
- E3 2000 Game Critics Awards: Best Racing Game
