= The Need for Speed =

1994 video game

Road & Track Presents: The Need for Speed
- 3DO box art featuring a Ferrari 512TR and a Porsche 911 (993)
- Developers: EA Canada (Note: The game's front cover credits the developers as "Pioneer Productions and Electronic Arts Canada".); EA Seattle (PC)
- Publishers: Electronic Arts; Electronic Arts Studios (PC)
- Producer: Hanno Lemke
- Programmer: Brad Gour
- Artist: Markus Tessmann
- Composers: Jeff van Dyck; Saki Kaskas
- Series: Need for Speed
- Platforms: 3DO, MS-DOS, PlayStation, Saturn, Windows
- Release: December 2, 1994: 3DO; EU: December 2, 1994; NA: December 13, 1994 MS-DOS; NA: September 1995 PlayStation; NA: March 20, 1996; EU: March 29, 1996 Saturn; NA: June 26, 1996; EU: July 5, 1996 Windows; NA: December 30, 1996; EU: January 2, 1997
- Genre: Racing
- Modes: Single-player, multiplayer

Road & Track Presents: The Need for Speed (also known simply as The Need for Speed) is a 1994 racing game developed by EA Canada and Pioneer Productions and published by Electronic Arts for 3DO. Versions with additional tracks were released for MS-DOS (1995), PlayStation (1996), and Saturn (1996). The 1996 Windows release is subtitled SE (Special Edition).

The Need for Speed allows driving eight licensed sports cars in three point-to-point tracks either with or without a computer controlled opponent. Checkpoints, traffic vehicles, and police pursuits appear in the races. Electronic Arts collaborated with automotive magazine Road & Track to match vehicle behaviour, including the mimicking of the sounds made by the vehicles' gear control levers. The game contains precise vehicle data with spoken commentary, several "magazine-style" images of each car's interior and exterior and short video clips highlighting the vehicles set to music.

The game was a commercial success. Video game publications praised the incorporation of realism into the gameplay and graphics, as well as the inclusion of full-motion videos.

It is the first game in the Need for Speed franchise, a sequel Need for Speed II was released in 1997.

== Gameplay ==
The player driving a Chevrolet Corvette C4 on the Coastal course

The premise of The Need for Speed involves racing in sports cars, including several exotic models and Japanese imports. The original 3DO version includes three point-to-point tracks, each divided into three stages; subsequent ports feature both the point-to-point tracks and new closed circuits. The Saturn and PlayStation versions include an additional three tracks. Traffic vehicles appear in races, and may be avoided by the player. Police pursuits are also a key gameplay mechanic, with the player ticketed or arrested if a police car succeeds in catching up with them. Players are arrested if they receive a third police ticket when they always stop immediately, or a second ticket when the police has to chase and forcefully stop the player (or a second ticket in the Sega Saturn version). In the special edition, completing the tournament once unlocks the Lost Vegas track, as well as the "Warrior PTO E/2", a fictional jet-powered sports car. Completing the tournament a 2nd time it will unlock the "rally" (where car dynamics are changed to make for a faster "arcade" experience) and mirrored mode.

Except for the aforementioned Warrior, each car in the game comes with detailed specifications, history, audio commentaries and real-life videos, which would also be featured in subsequent games in the series, though this was omitted in later games. A replay feature allowed the player to view a saved race. Multiple camera views, playback speed and video navigation are offered.

Multiplayer consists of a two-player head-to-head racing mode, which requires computers connected via modem.

There are a total of six courses in the game (three in the 3DO version): City, Coastal, Alpine, Rusty Springs, Autumn Valley and Vertigo. Each is a distinctive environment. City, Coastal and Alpine have three sections each, while the others are circuit races.

There is an extra track in the game, named Lost Vegas, which can be unlocked by winning all of the tracks above in tournament mode. A flag in the bottom right corner of the track's image indicates a victory in the menu to help the player keep up with the progress.

== Development and release ==
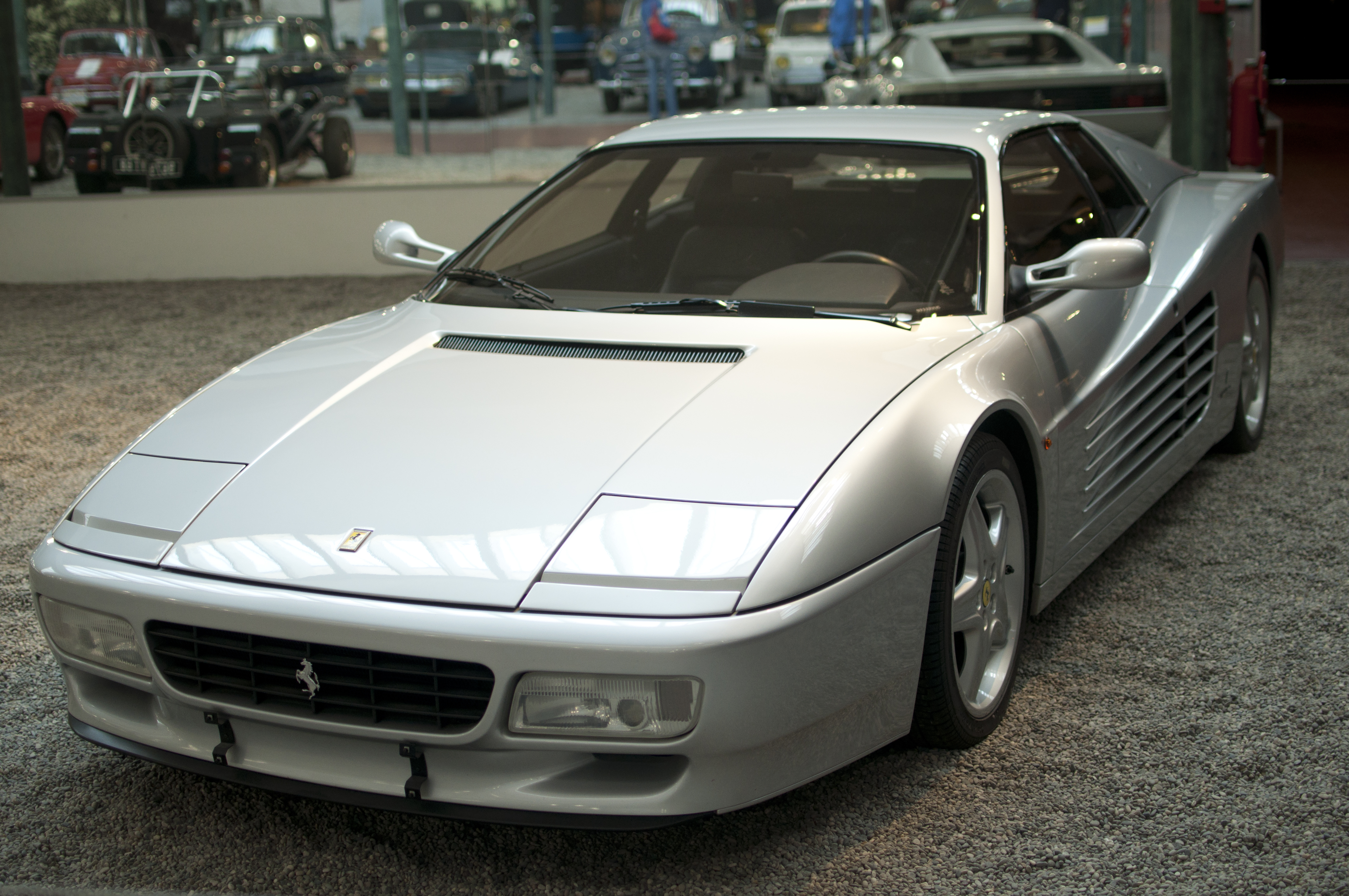
The Ferrari 512 TR is one of the eight cars included in the original 3DO version.

The Need for Speed was noted for its realism and audio and video commentaries. Electronic Arts collaborated with automotive magazine Road & Track to match vehicle behaviour, including the mimicking of the sounds made by the vehicles' gear control levers. The game also contained precise vehicle data with commentary, several "magazine-style" images of each car's interior and exterior and short video clips highlighting the vehicles set to music. Inspiration for the gameplay came from Test Drive, which had shared development staff with The Need for Speed. The Need for Speed was released in 1994 for 3DO consoles.

=== Ports ===
In 1996, an edition of The Need for Speed, The Need for Speed: Special Edition, was released only on PC CD-ROM, containing MS-DOS and Windows 95 versions. It has two new tracks ("Transtropolis" and "Burnt Sienna") and enhancements to the game engine. The Windows 95 version supports DirectX 2 and IPX networking.

The Need for Speed: Special Edition is the only game in the Need for Speed series to support MS-DOS, as subsequent releases only support Windows 9x.

In June 1995, Atari Corporation struck a deal with EA in order to bring several titles from their catalog (including The Need for Speed) to the Atari Jaguar CD. These ports, along with The Need for Speed, went unreleased.

=== Japanese versions ===
In 1994, Electronic Arts Victor translated the 3DO version of The Need for Speed into Japanese, and released it in Japan as Road & Track Presents: OverDrivin' (Note: ロード＆トラックプレゼンツ：オーバードライビン, Rōdo & Torakku Purezento: Ōbādoraibin). The PlayStation port of the game was exported to that country as Over Drivin' DX (Note: オーバードライビンDX, Ōbā Doraibin DX) in 1996. Two additional Nissan-sponsored versions of the game were announced at that year's Tokyo Game Show: Nissan Presents: Over Drivin' GT-R (Note: 日産プレゼンツ:オーバードライビンGT-R, Nissan Purezento: Ōbā Doraibin GT-R) (released in 1996 for the Sega Saturn) and Nissan Presents: Over Drivin' Skyline Memorial (Note: 日産プレゼンツ:オーバードライビンスカイラインメモリアル, Nissan Purezento: Ōbā Doraibin Sukairain Memoriaru) (released in 1997 for the PlayStation). The former's car lineup consists only of Nissan vehicles, whilst the latter exclusively features Skyline models.

== Reception ==
Reception

Review scores
Publication	Score			
Publication	3DO	PC	PS	Saturn
AllGame	4.5/5		4/5	
Computer and Video Games	93/100		3/5	
Edge	8/10			
Electronic Gaming Monthly	9.5/10, 9/10, 6.5/10, 7/10		8.75/10	
GamePro			4.5/5	
GameSpot		8.3/10		
IGN			7/10	
Mean Machines Sega				90/100
Next Generation	2/5		4/5	4/5
Maximum			2/5	
PC Power		95%		
Sega Saturn Magazine				75%

The game reached number 5 in the UK sales chart. The PC version reached the top ten in many software retailers charts for several months following its release.

The Need For Speed was met with positive reviews. The four reviewers of Electronic Gaming Monthly scored the 3DO version an 8.0 average, with two of them giving the game a 9.0 or higher. They praised the game's realistic graphics and sounds, addictive gameplay, and exceptionally clever use of full-motion video. GamePro gave it a rave review as well, commenting that the selection of cars "will leave car buffs drooling" and the realistic graphics and handling of each vehicle "infuse the game with taut realism and fascinating variety". They expressed disappointment over the lack of two-player mode, but felt that the exceptionally challenging enemy AI largely makes up for it. Next Generation reviewed the 3DO version of the game and stated that "while everything is in place for a truly great game, the unfortunate and total need of speed prevents The Need for Speed from ever being more than a pleasant Sunday drive".

British magazine PC Power gave the Windows version a score of 95%, praising car handling, graphics and overall presentation, but criticizing hardware requirements and sound. Jim Varner of GameSpot gave the game a "Great" rating of 8.3/10, citing "With its marvellous attention to detail, exotic course design, and straightforward gameplay, this game is a true winner. Simply put, The Need for Speed is the next best thing to owning a $200,000 sports car!" The two sports reviewers of Electronic Gaming Monthly applauded the PlayStation version for its fast racing and excellent controls. Air Hendrix argued in GamePro that "With all these improvements, [the PlayStation version] is practically a sequel to the 3DO game, and it plays like one." He made particular mention of the additional courses, the handbrake, the improved displays, and the faster speed of the game. A Next Generation critic likewise found it faster and more responsive than the 3DO version and held it to be one of the PlayStation's best racing games to date. Other magazines were more critical, with PSM criticising the "obtrusive graphics" and saying that it "isn't an immediately enjoyable game – the idiosyncracies only serve to annoy". Maximum complained that the driving lacks intensity and cars are too resistant to crashes, though they acknowledged the graphics are moderately impressive.

Air Hendrix rated the Saturn version as "comparable with – and occasionally better than – the impressive PlayStation version", highlighting the controls in particular as superior to previous versions of the game. He concluded: "The gameplay demands both precision driving and cajones, and although mastery takes time to achieve, Need's ultimately more satisfying than Daytona or Sega Rally." Rob Allsetter of Sega Saturn Magazine, however, said that while The Need for Speed is good on its own terms, it looks dated compared to the two games Air Hendrix referenced. He also disliked the game's elements of realism, arguing that racing games are more fun when they indulge in wild fantasy. A Next Generation critic said that it was "Certainly as fast, but not as crisp as the PlayStation version", but nonetheless "A better racer than most."

=== Accolades ===
The Need for Speed was a runner-up for Computer Gaming World's 1995 "Action Game of the Year" award, which ultimately went to Crusader: No Remorse. The editors wrote: "The Need for Speed, Electronic Arts' incredibly fast and enthralling driving game, almost caught the checkered flag. Multiple courses with distinctive feels, brilliant SVGA graphics, and some of the hottest iron on the road made this 3DO conversion a worthy entry into the PC action game arena." In 1996, GamesMaster ranked The Need for Speed 87th on their "Top 100 Games of All Time". In the same issue, they also rated the 3DO version 6th in its "The GamesMaster 3DO Top 10". In 1998, Saturn Power listed the game 100th in their Top 100 Sega Saturn Games.

== See also ==
- Grand Prix Unlimited, another Road & Track licensed game
