= Need for Speed: No Limits =

2015 racing video game

- Circa 2020 key art featuring a Porsche 918 Spyder and Mercedes-Benz SLK55 AMG evading the police
- Developer: Firemonkeys Studios
- Publisher: Electronic Arts
- Series: Need for Speed
- Platforms: iOS; Android
- Release: September 30, 2015
- Genre: Racing
- Modes: Single-player, multiplayer

Need for Speed: No Limits (stylized as NFS No Limits from 2021 onward) is a 2015 free-to-play racing game for iOS and Android, and a mobile installment in the Need for Speed video game series, developed by Codemasters and published by Electronic Arts. It is the twenty-first installment in the franchise, the franchise's second free-to-play title (after Need for Speed: World), as well as the franchise's first original title made for mobile devices, unlike past mobile games in the series that were adaptations or companions of various Need for Speed games. It was released worldwide on September 30, 2015.

== Gameplay ==
Need for Speed: No Limits has a heavy focus on street racing, vehicle customization, and avoiding the police.

The player must race in "Campaign races" (essentially the game's story mode), "Car Series races" (where only certain cars may participate to gain more campaign levels or 'reputation') and "Rival Races" (ghost-based multiplayer races). The player can also participate in time-limited special events, with a special car loaned for use in the event. If the player is able to complete the event within its time limit, the loaned car will be permanently added to the player's garage as a completion reward.

Most cars in the game can be customized with wheels, body-kits, widebody kits, paint jobs, and wraps, in addition to performance upgrade. Unique cars acquired from time-limited special events (as well as Ferrari cars), however, can never be visually customized.

On January 23, 2023, a new game mode called "Interceptor mode" was added where the player joins the police force to bust other street racers.

== Development ==
The game was developed by Firemonkeys Studios (Real Racing 3 developers) and was published by Electronic Arts.

The game was released on iOS on January 6, 2015, but only in Taiwan and the Netherlands. The game was initially only playable in Dutch as an alpha version for early testing. The game was released on Android on February 17, 2015 as a beta version, and was still only available in Dutch. The worldwide launch was in English, with better compatibility for quad-core and octa-core devices in which the game often crashed at its beta version. A new teaser trailer was released on YouTube on 18 September 2015. The worldwide release of the finished game was on 30 September 2015.

== Reception ==
Reception

Aggregate score
Aggregator	Score
Metacritic	67/100

Review scores
Publication	Score
Pocket Gamer	4/5
TouchArcade	4/5

Need for Speed: No Limits received mixed reviews. Critics praised the game's visuals, controls, and gameplay, but criticized its aggressive free-to-play system and short races. Review aggregator website Metacritic gave the game 67/100 based on 8 reviews.

Harry Slater of Pocket Gamer gave the game a score of 4 out of 5 stars, praising the game's visuals, fast gameplay, and free access, but criticizing the game's short races. Keith Andrew of Trusted Reviews gave the game 3/5, criticising the need to pay a considerable amount of microtransactions if players want to access all cars.
