= Need for Speed =

Racing video game franchise

- Logo since 2022
- Genre: Racing
- Developers: Previous: Criterion Games (2010–13; 2020–25); EA Black Box (2002–11); EA Bright Light (2009); EA Canada (1994–2000); EA Seattle (1997–1999); Eden Studios (1998–2000); Exient Entertainment (2006–10); Firebrand Games (2008–11); Firemonkeys Studios (2006–23); Ghost Games (2013–19); Piranha Games (2008); Slightly Mad Studios (2009–11)
- Publisher: Electronic Arts
- Platforms: List: 3DO; Android; Arcade; BlackBerry; Game Boy Advance; iOS; Java ME; Kindle Fire; Mac OS X; Windows; MS-DOS; Nintendo 3DS; Nintendo DS; GameCube; Nintendo Switch; OS X; PlayStation; PlayStation 2; PlayStation 3; PlayStation 4; PlayStation 5; PlayStation Portable; PlayStation Vita; Sega Saturn; Symbian; Wii; Wii U; Windows Mobile; Windows Phone; Xbox; Xbox 360; Xbox One; Xbox Series X/S; Zeebo
- First release: The Need for Speed; December 2, 1994
- Latest release: Need for Speed Unbound; December 2, 2022

Need for Speed (NFS) is a racing game franchise published by Electronic Arts. Most entries in the series are generally arcade racing games centered around illegal street racing, and task players with completing races of various types while evading police pursuit. Some entries also do not follow the basic setup of most titles and are instead simulation racers, focus on legal circuit races, feature kart racing game elements, or feature illegal street racing but do not also feature police pursuits. Need for Speed is one of EA's oldest franchises not published under their EA Sports brand.

The series' first title, The Need for Speed, was released in 1994. The last installment, Need for Speed Unbound, was released on December 2, 2022. Additionally, a free-to-play mobile installment released in 2015, Need for Speed: No Limits, was developed by Firemonkeys Studios (the developers of Real Racing 3).

The series titles have been overseen and developed by multiple notable teams over the years, including EA Canada, EA Black Box, Slightly Mad Studios, Criterion Games and Ghost Games. Several Need for Speed games have been well-received critically, and the franchise has been one of the most successful of all time, selling over 150 million copies as of October 2013. The franchise has expanded into other forms of media, including a film adaptation and licensed Hot Wheels toys.

== History ==
The Need for Speed series was originally developed by Distinctive Software, a video game studio based in Vancouver, British Columbia, Canada. Prior to Electronic Arts' purchase of the company in 1991, it had created popular racing games such as Stunts and Test Drive II: The Duel. After the purchase, the company was renamed Electronic Arts (EA) Canada. The company capitalized on its experience in the domain by developing the Need for Speed series in late 1992. EA Canada continued to develop and expand the Need for Speed franchise up to 2002, when another Vancouver-based developer, named Black Box Games, was acquired by EA and contracted to continue the series with Need for Speed: Hot Pursuit 2. Meanwhile, Slightly Mad Studios would develop the 2009 sim racing title, Need for Speed: Shift, and its 2011 sequel, Shift 2: Unleashed.

The UK-based Criterion Games would develop the 2010 Hot Pursuit title; a successor to 1998's Need for Speed III: Hot Pursuit. The game introduced a social platform, titled Autolog, which allows players to track game progress, view leaderboards, share screenshots with friends, among other features. The 2010 Hot Pursuit game would be well-received; a remastered version was released ten years later in 2020. As a result of Hot Pursuit's critical success, in-contrast to the mixed reception of the Black Box-developed installments since 2007's Need for Speed: ProStreet, Criterion would become the lead developer of the franchise going forward. At E3 2012, Criterion Games vice president Alex Ward announced that random developers would no longer be developing NFS titles. Ward wouldn't confirm that all Need for Speed games in the future would be developed entirely by Criterion, but he did say the studio would have "strong involvement" in them and would have control over which NFS titles would be released in the future.

In August 2013, following the downsizing of Criterion Games, EA Swedish developer Ghost Games would become the main studio for the franchise, and oversee its future development. At the time, 80% of Ghost Games' work force consisted of former Criterion Games employees. From 2013 to 2019, Ghost Games would develop Need for Speed Rivals, the 2015 franchise reboot, 2017's Need for Speed Payback, and 2019's Need for Speed Heat. While Rivals was positively-received, the 2015 reboot and its follow-ups received more mixed reviews.

In February 2020, Criterion regained oversight of the franchise, with its first release since then being 2022's Need for Speed Unbound. Meanwhile, several past entries (namely Need for Speed: Carbon, Need for Speed: Undercover, Shift, Shift 2 and Need for Speed: The Run), with the exception of 2010's Hot Pursuit, and 2012's Need for Speed: Most Wanted, became delisted from online stores. Their respective online servers were shut down on August 31, 2021.

As part of a larger company organization in September 2023, Criterion Games was shifted from EA Sports to EA Entertainment, with the majority of the studio working to support the Battlefield series, though a core group within Criterion continued to work on updates for Unbound according to EA's Vince Zampella. By February 2025, however, the Need for Speed franchise was placed on hold as EA shifted the whole of Criterion to work on Battlefield 6, with the studio being later rebranded as Criterion – A Battlefield Studio in August 2025. Whilst EA promised that the series would return in 'new and interesting ways', by July 2026, EA's Rebecka Coutaz confirmed that Criterion would be focused solely on the Battlefield series, thus leaving Need for Speed with no primary developer.

== Gameplay ==
Almost all of the games in the NFS series employ the same fundamental rules and similar mechanics: the player controls a race car in a variety of races, the goal being to win the race. In the tournament/career mode, the player must win a series of races to unlock vehicles and tracks. Before each race, the player chooses a vehicle and has the option of selecting either an automatic or manual transmission. All games in the series have some form of multiplayer mode allowing players to race one another via a split screen, a LAN or the Internet. Since Need for Speed: High Stakes, the series has also integrated car body customization into gameplay.

Although the games share the same name, their tone and focus can vary significantly. For example, in some games the cars can suffer mechanical and visual damage, while in other games the cars cannot be damaged at all; in some games, the software simulates real-car behavior (physics), while in others there are more forgiving physics.

With the release of Need for Speed: Underground, the series shifted from racing sports cars on scenic point-to-point tracks to an import/tuner subculture involving street racing in an urban setting. To date, this theme has remained prevalent in most of the following games.

Need for Speed: Shift and its sequel took a simulator approach to racing, featuring closed-circuit racing on real tracks like the Nürburgring and Laguna Seca, as well as the fictional street circuits in various cities like London and Chicago. The car lists include a combination of exotics, sports cars, and tuners in addition to special race cars.

Most of the games in the franchise include police pursuits in some form or other. In some of the games featuring police pursuit (e.g. Need for Speed III: Hot Pursuit), the player can play as either the felon or the cop. The concepts of drifting and dragging were introduced in Need for Speed: Underground. These new mechanics are included in the tournament/career mode aside from the regular street races. In drift races, in games like Underground and Need for Speed (2015), the player must defeat other racers by totaling the most points, earned by the length and timing of the drift made by the player's vehicle. In drag races, the player must finish first to win the race, though if the player crashes into an obstacle or wall, the race ends. In Need for Speed Payback, the player has to earn a certain number of points to win; increase their multiplier based on how many points they get, whilst passing through a limited number of checkpoints.

The concept of car tuning evolved with each new game, from focusing mainly on the mechanics of the car to including how the car looks. Each game except Need for Speed: Hot Pursuit has car tuning which can set options for items like ABS, traction control, or downforce, or for upgrading parts like the engine or gearbox. Visual tuning of the player's car becomes important in tournament/career mode after the release of Need for Speed: Underground 2, when the appearance is rated from zero to ten points. When a car attains a high enough visual rating, the vehicle is eligible to be on the cover of a fictional magazine.

Like all racing games, the Need for Speed series features a list of cars, modeled and named after actual cars. Cars in the franchise are divided into four categories: exotic cars, muscle cars, tuners, and special vehicles. Exotic cars feature high performance, expensive cars like the Lamborghini Murciélago, Mercedes-Benz SLR McLaren, Chevrolet Corvette and the Ford GT; muscle cars refer to the Ford Mustang, Dodge Challenger and the Chevrolet Camaro; while tuner cars are cars like the Nissan Skyline and the Mitsubishi Lancer Evolution. The special vehicles are civilian and police cars that are available for use in some games, such as the Ford Crown Victoria in Need for Speed: Hot Pursuit and garbage trucks, fire engines and taxis in Need for Speed: Carbon.

Originally the series took place in international settings, such as race tracks in Australia, Europe, and Africa. Beginning with Underground, the series has taken place in fictional metropolitan cities. The first game featured traffic on "head to head" mode, while later games traffic can be toggled on and off, and starting with Underground, traffic is a fixed obstacle. Most of the recent Need for Speed games are set in fictional locations of our world, in a number of different time periods. These include, but are not limited to, Olympic, Bayview, Rockport, Palmont City, Tri-City Bay, Seacrest County, Fairhaven City, Redview County, Ventura Bay, Fortune Valley, Palm City and Lakeshore City.

== Games ==
Primary installments in the Need for Speed series
Title	Year	PC	Consoles	Handheld	Developer	Notes
The Need for Speed	1994	MS-DOS, Windows	3DO, Saturn, PS	—N/a	Electronic Arts Canada	3DO version was the first version to be released. Known in Japan as Over Drivin' and Over Drivin' DX.
Need for Speed II	1997	Windows	PS	—N/a	EA (Canada/Seattle)	Prototypes and showcars available. Known as Over Drivin' II in Japan.
Need for Speed III: Hot Pursuit	1998	Windows	PS	—N/a	EA (Canada/Seattle)	Known as Over Drivin' III: Hot Pursuit in Japan, and Need for Speed III: Poursuite Infernale in France.
Need for Speed: High Stakes	1999	Windows	PS	—N/a	EA (Canada/Seattle)	Known as Need for Speed: Road Challenge in most European countries and Brazil, Need for Speed: Conduite en état de liberté in France, Need for Speed: Brennender Asphalt in Germany, and Over Drivin' IV in Japan.
Need for Speed: Porsche Unleashed	2000	Windows	PS	GBA	Eden Games (PS); EA Canada (PC); Pocketeers (GBA)	Known as Need for Speed: Porsche 2000 in most European countries, Brazil, Australia and Asian markets, and as Need for Speed: Porsche in Germany and most of Latin America.
Need for Speed: Hot Pursuit 2	2002	Windows	GC, PS2, Xbox	—N/a	Black Box (PS2); EA Seattle (GC, PC, Xbox)	Known as Need for Speed: Poursuite Infernale 2 in France.
Need for Speed: Underground	2003	Windows	GC, PS2, Xbox	GBA	EA Black Box	
Need for Speed: Underground 2	2004	Windows	GC, PS2, Xbox	GBA, DS, PSP	EA Black Box	PSP version was titled Need for Speed: Underground Rivals.
Need for Speed: Most Wanted	2005	Windows	GC, PS2, Xbox, Xbox 360	GBA, Mobile, DS, PSP	EA Black Box	PSP version was titled Need for Speed: Most Wanted 5-1-0.
Need for Speed: Carbon	2006	Windows, Mac OS X	GC, PS2, Xbox, PS3, Wii, Xbox 360	GBA, Mobile, DS, PSP	EA (Canada/Black Box)	PSP, DS and GBA versions were titled Need for Speed: Carbon Own the City.
Need for Speed: ProStreet	2007	Windows	PS2, PS3, Wii, Xbox 360	Mobile, DS, PSP	EA Black Box	
Need for Speed: Undercover	2008	Windows	PS2, PS3, Wii, Xbox 360	Mobile, DS, PSP, Windows Mobile, iOS	EA Black Box (PS3, PC, Xbox 360); Exient Entertainment (PS2, Wii); Firebrand Games (DS); Piranha Games (PSP)	
Need for Speed: Shift	2009	Windows	PS3, Xbox 360	PSP, Mobile, Windows Mobile, Android, iOS	Slightly Mad Studios (PS3, PC, Xbox 360); EA Bright Light (PSP)	
Need for Speed: Nitro	2009	—N/a	Wii	DS	Firebrand Games; EA Montreal	The DSiWare version was called Need for Speed: Nitro-X.
Need for Speed: World	2010	Windows	—N/a	—N/a	EA Black Box	Free-to-play MMO racing game. Closed in 2015.
Need for Speed: Hot Pursuit	2010	Windows	PS3, PS4, Wii, Switch, Xbox 360, Xbox One	Mobile, Windows Phone, Android, iOS	Criterion Games; Exient Entertainment (Wii)	Revival of the Hot Pursuit name. Later was remastered in November 2020, prior to the 10th anniversary of this release (first remastered title in the franchise).
Shift 2: Unleashed	2011	Windows	PS3, Xbox 360	iOS	Slightly Mad Studios	Also known as Need for Speed: Shift 2 - Unleashed.
Need for Speed: The Run	2011	Windows	PS3, Wii, Xbox 360	Mobile, 3DS	EA Black Box; Firebrand Games (3DS, Wii)	
Need for Speed: Most Wanted	2012	Windows	PS3, Wii U, Xbox 360	Mobile, PS Vita, Android, iOS	Criterion Games	The game is a revival of the original 2005 Most Wanted title. The Wii U version (released 2013) was titled Need for Speed: Most Wanted U.
Need for Speed Rivals	2013	Windows	PS3, PS4, Xbox 360, Xbox One	—N/a	Ghost Games; Criterion Games	Need for Speed Rivals: Complete Edition was released on October 21, 2014 (including all DLC packs & pre-order bonuses).
Need for Speed: No Limits	2015	—N/a	—N/a	Android, iOS	Firemonkeys Studios	
Need for Speed	2015	Windows	PS4, Xbox One	—N/a	Ghost Games	Series reboot. Requires consistent internet connectivity.
Need for Speed Payback	2017	Windows	PS4, Xbox One	—N/a	Ghost Games	
Need for Speed Heat	2019	Windows	PS4, Xbox One	—N/a	Ghost Games	June 2020 update introduces cross-platform play, the first EA game to include it.
Need for Speed Unbound	2022	Windows	PS5, Xbox Series X/S	—N/a	Criterion Games; Codemasters	

=== Primary installments ===
Aggregate review scores
Game	Metacritic
The Need for Speed	(PC) 83% (Note: GameRankings score) (PS) 68% (SAT) 95%
Need for Speed II	(PC) 68% (PS) 71/100
Need for Speed III: Hot Pursuit	(PC) 84% (PS) 88/100
Need for Speed: High Stakes	(PS) 86/100 (PC) 83%
Need for Speed: Porsche Unleashed	(GBA) 62/100 (PC) 84% (PS) 78/100
Motor City Online	(PC) 73/100
Need for Speed: Hot Pursuit 2	(GC) 68/100 (PC) 73/100 (PS2) 89/100 (Xbox) 75/100
Need for Speed: Underground	(GBA) 77/100 (GC) 83/100 (PC) 82/100 (PS2) 85/100 (Xbox) 83/100
Need for Speed: Underground 2	(GBA) 72/100 (GC) 79% (NDS) 65/100 (PC) 82/100 (PS2) 82/100 (PSP) 74/100 (Xbox) 77/100
Need for Speed: Most Wanted (2005)	(GC) 80/100 (NDS) 45/100 (PC) 82/100 (PS2) 82/100 (PSP) 72/100 (Xbox) 83/100 (X360) 83/100
Need for Speed: Carbon	(GC) 75/100 (NDS) 70/100 (PC) 78/100 (PS2) 74/100 (PS3) 75/100 (PSP) 73/100 (Wii) 67/100 (Xbox) 74/100 (X360) 77/100
Need for Speed: ProStreet	(NDS) 74/100 (PC) 70/100 (PS2) 62/100 (PS3) 73/100 (PSP) 57/100 (Wii) 61/100 (X360) 72/100
Need for Speed: Undercover	(NDS) 59/100 (PC) 65/100 (PS3) 59/100 (PSP) 52/100 (Wii) 54/100 (X360) 64/100
Need for Speed: Shift	(PC) 83/100 (PS3) 84/100 (PSP) 69/100 (X360) 83/100
Need for Speed: Nitro	(NDS) 70/100 (Wii) 69/100
Need for Speed: World	(PC) 62/100
Need for Speed: Hot Pursuit	(PC) 86/100 (PS3) 89/100 (Wii) 50/100 (X360) 88/100
Shift 2: Unleashed	(PC) 84/100 (PS3) 81/100 (X360) 82/100
Need for Speed: The Run	(3DS) 65/100 (PC) 69/100 (PS3) 64/100 (Wii) 64/100 (X360) 68/100
Need for Speed: Most Wanted (2012)	(PC) 78/100 (PS3) 84/100 (Vita) 79/100 (WIIU) 86/100 (X360) 84/100
Need for Speed Rivals	(PC) 76/100 (PS3) 80/100 (PS4) 80/100 (X360) 76/100 (XONE) 75/100
Need for Speed: No Limits	(iOS) 67/100
Need for Speed	(PC) 68/100 (PS4) 66/100 (XONE) 65/100
Need for Speed Payback	(PC) 62/100 (PS4) 61/100 (XONE) 61/100
Need for Speed Heat	(PC) 72/100 (PS4) 72/100 (XONE) 74/100
Need for Speed Unbound	(PC) 73/100 (PS5) 77/100 (XSXS) 77/100

==== The Need for Speed (1994) ====
The original Need for Speed was released for 3DO in 1994 with versions released for MS-DOS (1995), PlayStation, and Saturn (1996) following shortly afterwards. The Need for Speed and its Special Edition were the only games in the series to support DOS, with subsequent releases for the PC running only on Windows (excluding Need for Speed: Carbon which was also released on Mac OS X).

The first installment of The Need for Speed was the only serious attempt by the series to provide a realistic simulation of car handling elements through the direct collaboration of Staff members from Road & Track. Electronic Arts left the handling dynamics tuning with the automotive magazine's seasoned drivers to match vehicle behavior including realistic over and understeer that remains impressive decades later, as well as sounds made by the vehicles' gear control levers and other functions. The game contained vehicle data with spoken commentary, several "magazine-style" images of each car, and short video clips highlighting the vehicles set to music. Most cars and tracks are available at the beginning of the game, and the objective is to unlock the remaining locked content by winning tournaments. This version featured chases by police cars, a popular theme throughout the series.

Another version called The Need for Speed: Special Edition, was released only for the PC in 1996. It featured support for DirectX 2 and TCP/IP networking, two new tracks, but dropped the ever-popular flip and go in favor of the more generic scene reset after an accident, a portents of the arcade-style gaming that would dominate the series ever after.

==== Need for Speed II (1997) ====
Need for Speed II (NFS II) featured some rare and exotic vehicles, including the Ford Indigo concept vehicle, and featured country-themed tracks from North America, Europe, Asia, and Australia. A new racing mode was also introduced, dubbed "Knockout", where the last racers to finish laps will be eliminated. In addition, track design was more open-ended; players could now "drive" off the asphalt, and cut across fields to take advantage of shortcuts. Need for Speed II: Special Edition includes one extra track, extra cars, and support for Glide. The PlayStation port of NFS II also took advantage of the NeGcon controller, and the Dual Analog and DualShock controllers as well.

==== Need for Speed III: Hot Pursuit (1998) ====
Need for Speed III: Hot Pursuit added Hot Pursuit mode, where the player either attempted to outrun the police or be the cop, arresting speeders. NFS III took advantage of the multimedia capabilities by featuring audio commentary, picture slideshows, and music videos. This game was the first in the series to allow the downloading of additional cars from the official website. As a result, modding communities sprang up to create vehicles. The PC version was also the first game in the series to support Direct3D hardware.

==== Need for Speed: High Stakes (1999) ====
High Stakes, developed by EA Canada and EA Seattle, was released in 1999. The game features more realistic elements than its predecessors and introduced a damage system that allows cars to take damage when colliding with objects, affecting their appearance and performance. It also introduced a series of economy-based tournaments, awarding players with a cash prize that can be spent on repairing, purchasing, or upgrading cars for subsequent races. The game's Hot Pursuit mode, which was introduced in Hot Pursuit, was expanded with more options, allowing players to control police pursuits attempting to stop racers.

==== Need for Speed: Porsche Unleashed (2000) ====
Porsche Unleashed (North America and Latin America title), Porsche 2000 (European and Australian title), or simply Porsche (in Germany) is different from the previous versions because it featured only Porsches.

The vehicle handling in the PC version was said to be the most realistic in any NFS game, but the PSX (PS1) version had very simplified arcade handling that fell woefully short of the hallmark handling offered in the first game. The player had to win races to unlock cars in chronological order from 1950 to 2000. Porsche Unleashed also featured a Factory Driver mode, where the player had to test Porsches to move forward in the game and did not feature a split-screen mode.

==== Need for Speed: Hot Pursuit 2 (2002) ====
Need for Speed: Hot Pursuit 2 was the debut NFS title from EA Black Box, and the first NFS for the sixth generation consoles. Different versions of the game were produced for each platform. The Xbox, GameCube, and Microsoft Windows versions were developed by EA Seattle, while the PS2 version was developed by Black Box Games in Vancouver.

Hot Pursuit 2 draws primarily from the gameplay and style of NFS III, putting emphasis on evading the police and over-the-top tracks. Although the game allowed players to play as the police, the pursuit mode was less realistic than preceding versions of NFS; players merely needed to "tap" a speeder to arrest them, as opposed to using simulated police tactics to immobilize a speeding vehicle. This was the first version since the start of the series not to feature an "in the driving seat" (cockpit) camera view, transitioning EA from realistic racing to arcade street racing. It was the last game in the series for the PC version to feature the split-screen two-player mode introduced in Need for Speed II. For the multiplayer mode of the PC version, GameSpy's internet matchmaking system was used in place of Local Area Network (LAN) play. Hot Pursuit 2 was the first NFS game to use songs sung by licensed artists under the EA Trax label.

==== Need for Speed: Underground (2003) ====
Need for Speed: Underground was developed by EA Black Box and released in 2003. On PC, this was the first NFS game to require Hardware Transform and Lighting in graphics cards. Most of the new elements in Underground became defining marks of later installments in the Need for Speed series.

Underground shifted from semi-professional racing and isolated circuits to the street racing style of other arcade racing series: all circuits became part of a single map, Olympic City, except for drifts. Underground introduced two new play modes (Drag and Drift) and more tuning options than in the earlier High Stakes. Underground was also the first game in the series to feature a story, told via pre-rendered videos. Underground features tuner cars and has a wide variety of tuning options such as widebody kits, bumpers, spoilers, as well as performance upgrades such as engines and nitrous. City street racing is the primary focus of the game. There are no police in Underground and Underground 2, which drew criticism as police had been an important part of previous titles.

==== Need for Speed: Underground 2 (2004) ====
Need for Speed: Underground 2, was developed by EA Black Box and released in 2004. A demo of the game was placed as a bonus in copies of the EA/Criterion collaboration Burnout 3: Takedown.

In Underground 2, the story mode continued, but there were new racing modes such as Underground Racing League and Street X, more tuning options, and a new method of selecting races. Also included was an "outrun" mode where a player can challenge random opponents on the road (similar to Tokyo Xtreme Racer). Underground 2 also introduced several SUVs, used to race against other SUVs. The most significant change vs. the original Underground was the introduction of its open world (free roam) environments, setting the tone for numerous NFS games to come. This was also the publisher's most marketed feature at launch. In addition, the game featured actresses/models Brooke Burke and Kelly Brook as in-game characters to help guide the player through the campaign.

The customization features were significantly expanded on modifications that did not affect vehicle performance. Players were required to customize their car to a certain numerical value in order to be offered DVD and magazine covers, the only way to advance to higher game levels. The game featured more extensive product placement for companies with no connection to auto racing. This game also had extensive customization options in the form of suspension upgrades, nitrous systems, and engine mods.

Need for Speed: Underground Rivals was the first Need for Speed game released on the PlayStation Portable. Different from Need for Speed: Underground 2 as it had no free roam and the cars were very limited, it was released in 2005.

==== Need for Speed: Most Wanted (2005) ====
Need for Speed: Most Wanted was developed by EA Black Box, released in 2005, and was one of the first games released for the Xbox 360. The PlayStation Portable port of Most Wanted is titled Need for Speed: Most Wanted 5-1-0.

Police chases represent a significant body of the gameplay, and includes the free-roaming aspect of Underground 2, but with less extensive vehicle customization features. The story mode is a different style from Underground, with CGI effects mixed with live-action. The game featured the Blacklist, a crew consisting of 15 racers that the player must beat one-by-one to unlock parts, cars, tracks, and to complete career mode. The player had to meet certain requirements before they could take on the next Blacklist rival, such as races completed, milestones achieved, and bounty earned.

A special Black Edition of Most Wanted was also released, featuring additional races, challenges, and a few bonus cars; it also included a behind-the-scenes DVD. Both versions were available for the PlayStation 2, Xbox, and Windows-based PCs, while only the standard edition was available for GameCube, Nintendo DS, and Xbox 360.

Most Wanted had extremely positive reviews and received universal acclaim from reviewers in many gaming websites and magazines, praising the graphics, sound effects, and general gameplay. With 16 million copies sold worldwide, Most Wanted is the best-selling game in the franchise. A game, also named Need for Speed: Most Wanted, was released in 2012 with British developer Criterion Games responsible for the development.

==== Need for Speed: Carbon (2006) ====
Need for Speed: Carbon was developed by EA Black Box in 2006. It was the first NFS game for the PlayStation 3 and the Wii and the last NFS game for the GameCube, the Game Boy Advance, and the Xbox. Carbon's handheld port is known as Need for Speed: Carbon – Own the City. The Wii port lacked online but made full use of the Wii Remote and Nunchuk.

NFS: Carbon continued the story from Most Wanted, but the game has far less emphasis on the police. Carbon saw the return of nighttime-only racing, with a selection of cars similar to that of Most Wanted. Carbon introduced a new feature wherein the player is allowed to form a "crew" that aids the player in races. Drift events returned to the series in Carbon. Drag racing was removed from the series, but a new type of race called "Canyon Duel" was added, where the closer the player is to the leader, the more points they accrue. If the player overtakes the leader and remains in front for 10 seconds, they win automatically. Another new feature is "Autosculpt", which allows players to custom-fabricate their own auto parts.

The Collector's Edition features three new cars, ten specially tuned cars, six new races, and a bonus DVD with behind-the-scenes footage on the making of the game.

==== Need for Speed: ProStreet (2007) ====
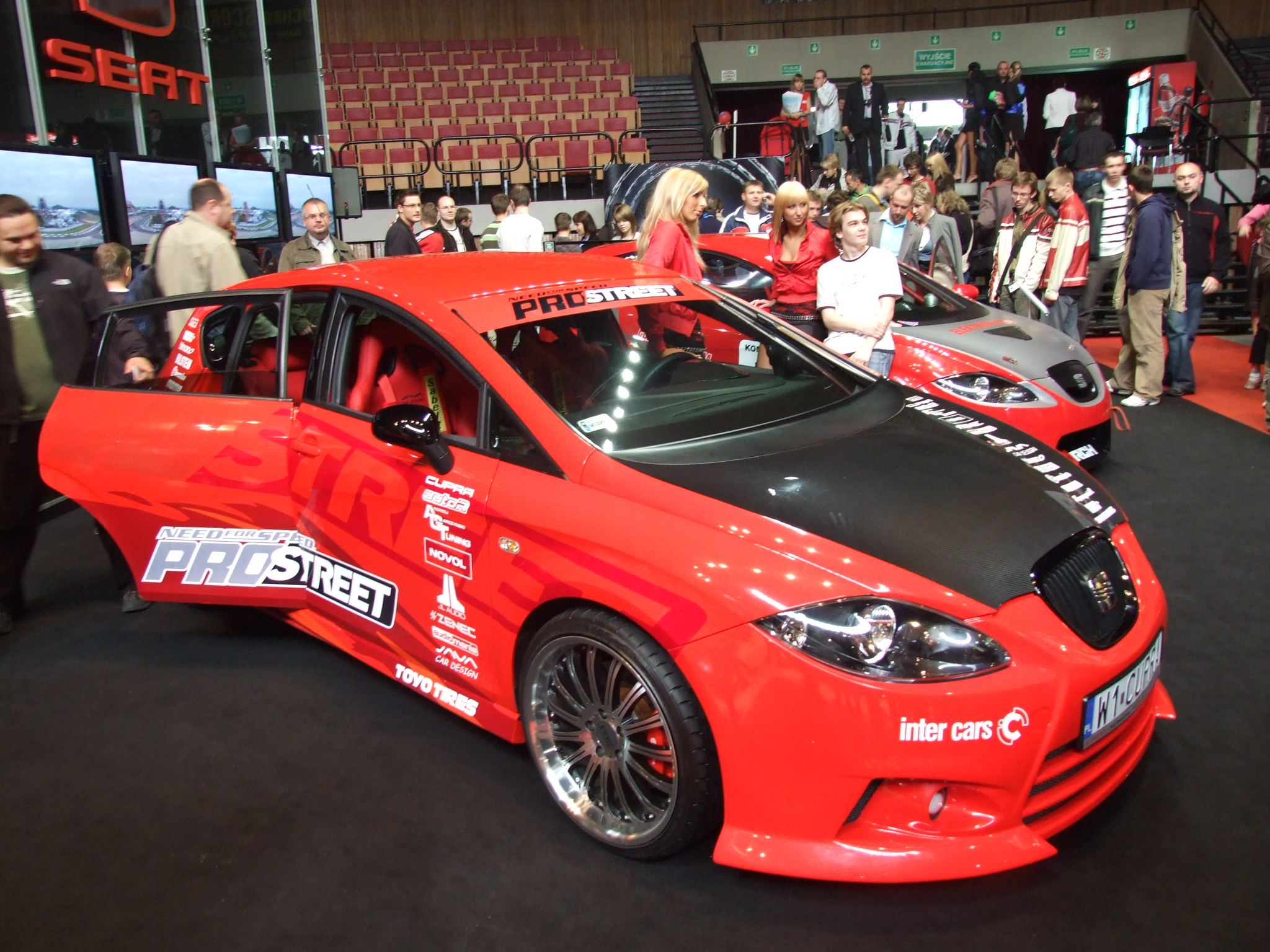
Promotion of Need for Speed: ProStreet at Auto Moto Show 2008

Need for Speed: ProStreet, developed by EA Black Box, was released in 2007. Key features of the game included realistic damage, a return to realistic racing, modeling, and burnouts. The game lacked the free roam mode found in earlier releases, instead, all of the races were on closed race tracks that took place on organized race days. The game consisted of drag races, speed challenges (essentially sprint races and speed traps), grip races (circuit racing), and drift races.

==== Need for Speed: Undercover (2008) ====
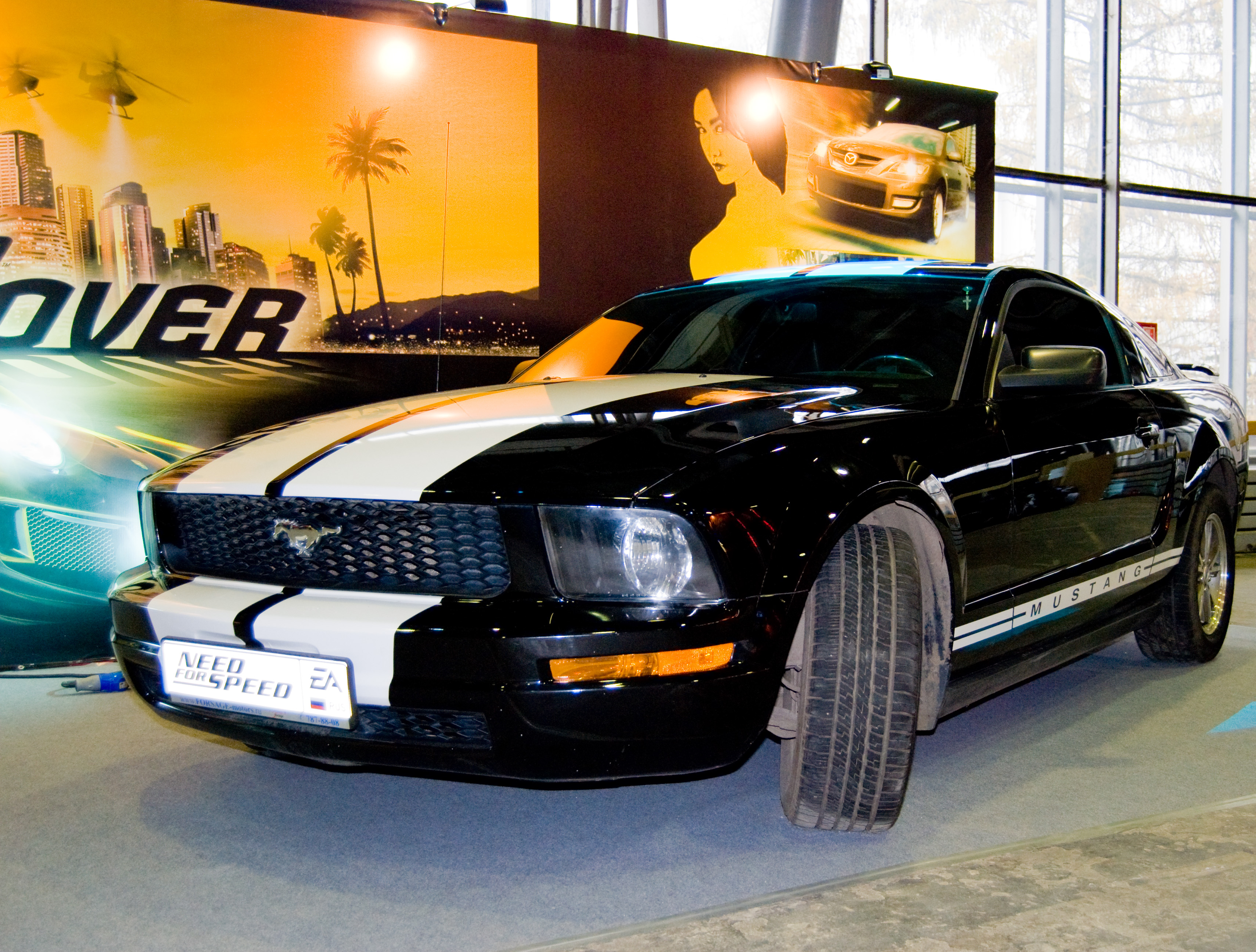
Promotion of Need for Speed: Undercover at IgroMir 2008

Need for Speed: Undercover, developed by EA Black Box, was released in 2008. The game had a significantly longer development cycle than previous games, taking 16 months to develop. EA ported Undercover to various mobile devices. It was the last Need for Speed game for PlayStation 2. EA Games president Frank Gibeau stated that since sales of ProStreet did not live up to EA's projections, the franchise would go back to its "roots". However, the game received lower scores on aggregate than ProStreet.

The game focused on tuning and police chases, featured over 50 cars, and took place in a fictional city called Tri-City Bay. The player's role was as an undercover cop, trying to stop street racers. Containing live-action cutscenes that feature the actress Maggie Q, the game also featured a damage system where parts could break off after a crash.

The Collector's Edition for PlayStation 3 and Xbox 360 added another five new cars, twelve new circuits, and sprint and checkpoint track configurations. Also included were specially tuned versions of ten existing cars, plus 35 exclusive vinyls for adding a unique visual style.

==== Need for Speed: Shift (2009) ====
Need for Speed: Shift, developed by Slightly Mad Studios, was released in 2009. It features over 60 cars and 19 tracks, some of which are licensed tracks while others are fictional. The improved driving simulation was accompanied by an adaptive difficulty, while it reintroduced a cockpit view. NFS: Shift focused on racing simulation rather than the arcade racing of previous titles.

NFS: Shift received better reviews than the prior three games in the series. The Special Edition contained a specially-tuned BMW M3 GT2, and an Elite Series track. Two items of downloadable content were released for the game.

==== Need for Speed: Nitro (2009) ====
Need for Speed: Nitro is the first NFS game made exclusively for Nintendo DS and Wii, featuring arcade-style gameplay and targeting a casual audience, released in 2009. Need for Speed: Nitro was also available as a social multiplayer game on Facebook.

Need for Speed: Nitro-X (2010) is a newer installment for use with the DSi/XL and the 3DS system. Essentially the original release, it was updated with several updates: 18 licensed vehicles; new police units; custom tags; 16 updated tracks; a revised career mode; local multiplayer matches for up to four players; and new rewards and unlockables. The game was released as a digital download only, released in 2010.

==== Need for Speed: World (2010) ====
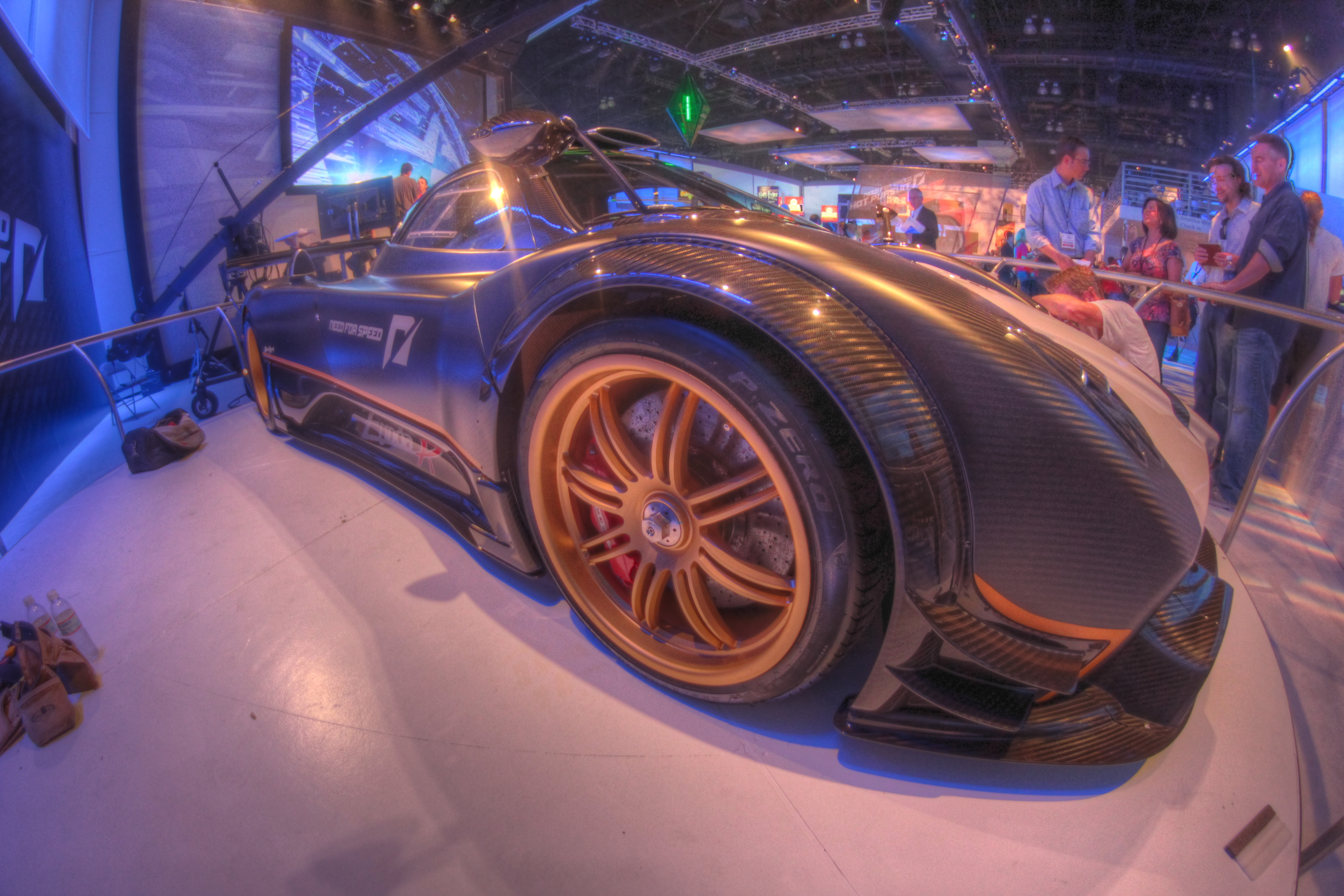
Promotion of Need for Speed: World at E3 2010

Need for Speed: World was a free-to-play MMO racing game for Windows-based PCs. It took on the gameplay style of Most Wanted and Carbon, focusing on illegal street racing, tuning and police chases, and adding classic MMO elements to the mix. World incorporated almost exact replicas of the cities of Rockport and Palmont, the cities of Most Wanted and Carbon respectively, into its map design. World was originally scheduled for an Asian release in the summer of 2009, but the game was not released at that time and it was released worldwide in 2010. The game was in public beta-testing limited to residents of Taiwan in October 2009

Need for Speed World closed its servers in July 2015. They soon after removed the ability to create new accounts for the game and began winding down their support for it. Leading up to closure, there were several "end of the world" promotions and in-game events held.

==== Need for Speed: Hot Pursuit (2010) ====
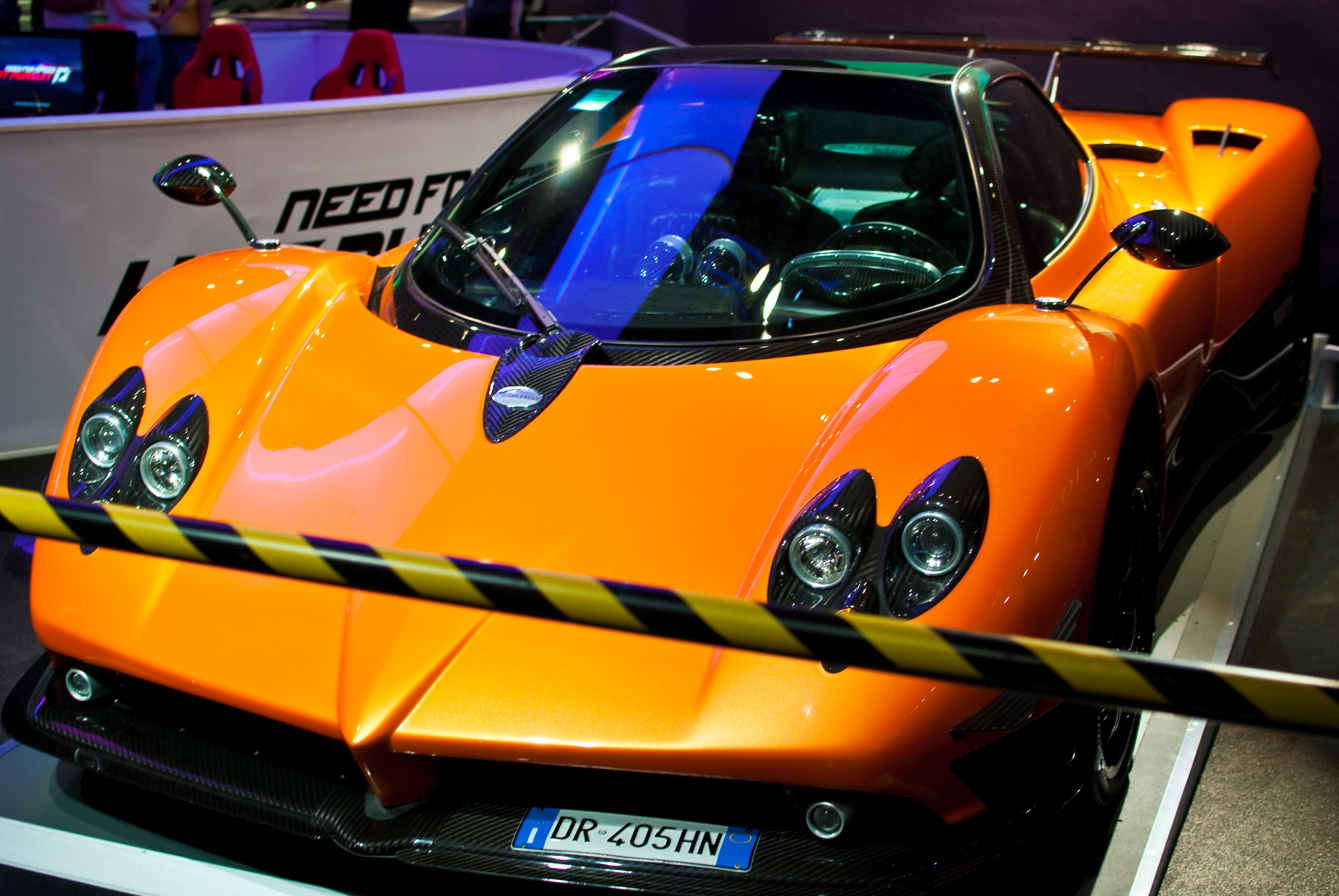
Promotion of Need for Speed: Hot Pursuit at Gamescom 2010

Need for Speed: Hot Pursuit was developed by British games developer Criterion Games and published by Electronic Arts in 2010. It focuses on racing and police chases rather than car customization. The game won many awards at the E3 2010, including "Best Racing Game", becoming the first game in the NFS series since the original Hot Pursuit to win an E3 award.

There were over 60 cars, most available to both racers and cops, but a few were exclusive to either side. Unlike previous NFS titles, there was no customization, and the game takes place in a fictional rural area called Seacrest County, which the "free roam" feature lets you explore. Hot Pursuit allows play as either police or racer. The game also features many weapons, with some exclusive to the cops or racers. The biggest feature introduced was Autolog, which tracked player progressions and recommended events to play. In addition to its statistical system, Autolog also features Facebook-like speedwalls where players can post their comments and photos while in the game. Hot Pursuit has received some of the best reviews of the series.

The Limited Edition gives players exclusive access to the Alfa Romeo 8C Competizione and Ford Shelby GT500. Various downloadable content was released for the game.

A remastered version of the game, Need for Speed: Hot Pursuit Remastered, was released in November 2020 for PlayStation 4, Xbox One, Nintendo Switch, and Microsoft Windows. It features cross-platform multiplayer, enhanced visuals, quality-of-life improvements, all main DLC from the PlayStation 3 and Xbox 360 versions, the return of Autolog, and 4K support for PlayStation 4 Pro, Xbox One X, and Windows.

==== Shift 2: Unleashed (2011) ====
The sequel to Need for Speed: Shift, Shift 2: Unleashed was developed by Slightly Mad Studios, and released in 2011. Shift 2 includes the Autolog feature introduced in Hot Pursuit. It also includes features such as night racing, an in-helmet camera, and a more in-depth career mode. Shift 2 features more than 140 vehicles available for racing and tuning, a smaller number compared with other racing games such as Forza Motorsport 3 and Gran Turismo 5. There are also 40 real-world locations including Bathurst, Spa-Francorchamps and Suzuka as well as fictional circuits.

The Limited Edition features three unlocked cars, and an additional 37 career race events. Two downloadable contents were released for Shift 2.

==== Need for Speed: The Run (2011) ====
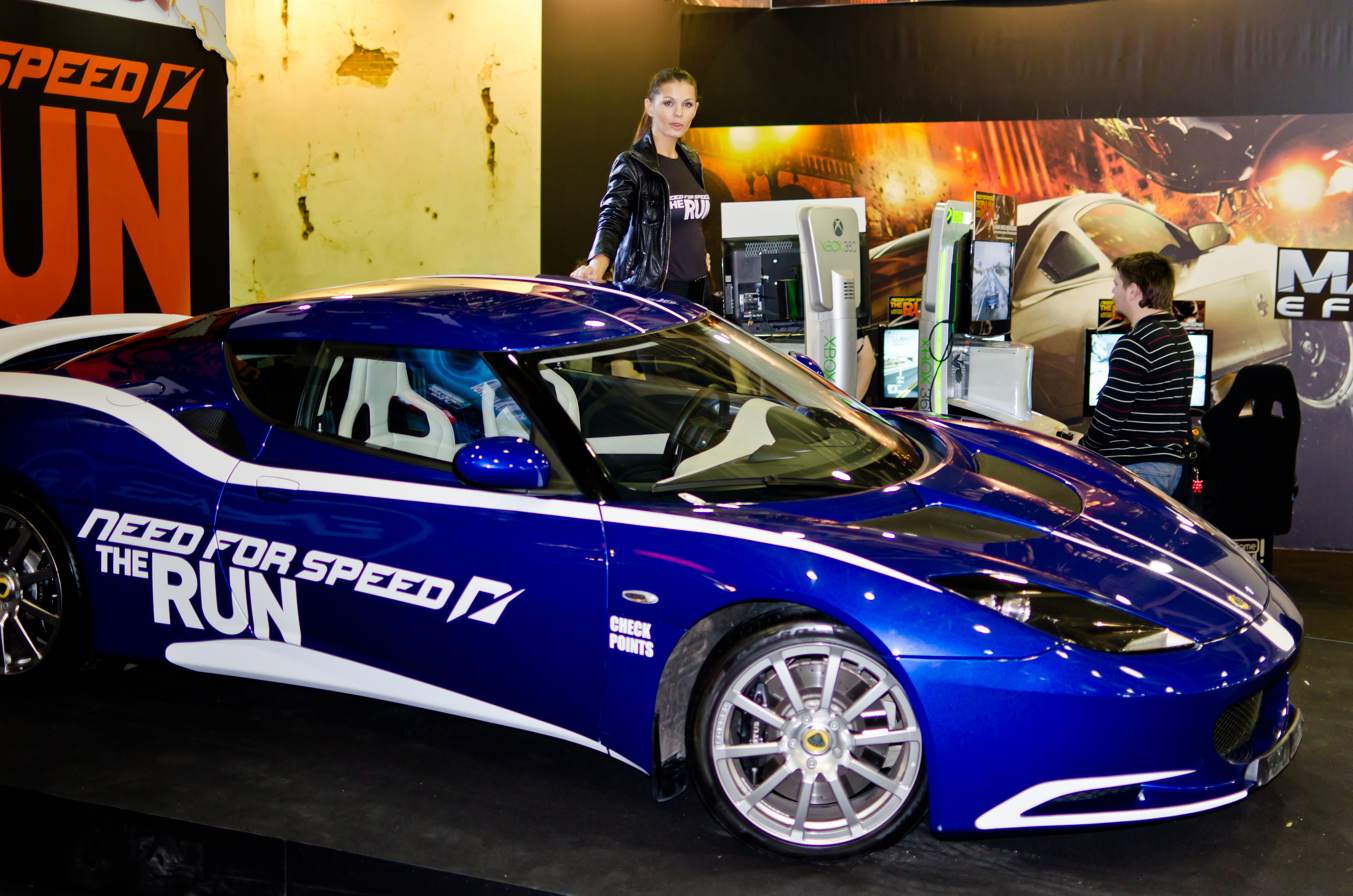
Promotion of Need for Speed: The Run at IgroMir 2011

Need for Speed: The Run was developed by EA Black Box, and released in 2011. The game continued the street-racing gameplay of Black Box's previous titles, with a story based on a race across the United States from San Francisco to New York.

The game featured quick time events with the player, for the first time in NFS history, exiting their car and traveling on foot. The Run was powered by DICE's Frostbite 2 engine, making the game the first non-shooter and one of the first console titles to use the engine. Additionally, the NFS Autolog was also used in the game.

The Run employs a large range of real-world vehicles, which can be altered with visual upgrades. An XP (Experience points) system is used for unlocking cars and events. The Limited Edition features three exclusive cars and five exclusive challenges with bonus rewards and achievements.

==== Need for Speed: Most Wanted (2012) ====
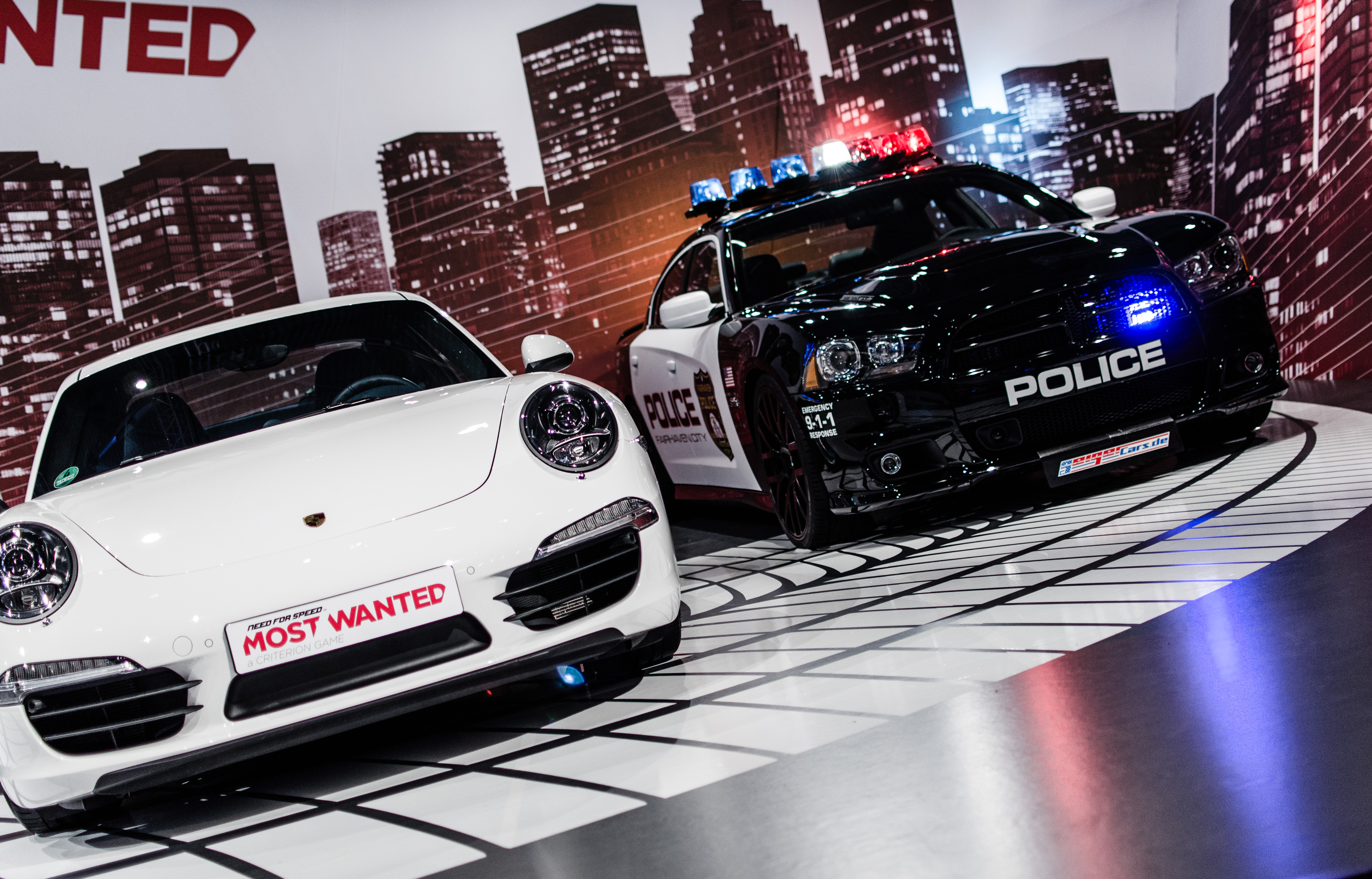
Promotion of Need for Speed: Most Wanted at Gamescom 2012

Need for Speed: Most Wanted was developed by British games developer Criterion Games, and released in 2012. The game picked up on the Most Wanted IP, as opposed to the Hot Pursuit extension. This was the first game made subsequent to Criterion Games taking over the NFS series from Black Box.

It features open-world racing, and most of the cars in the game are available from the start, hidden in different locations. It also features a blacklist of 10 instead of 15, and there is no story or visual customization for the game. It is powered by Autolog 2.0. Performance upgrades are available for all the cars in the game, such as chassis, tires, nitrous, and bodywork. Milestones and achievements are unlocked through a variety of ways, e.g. completion of races and breaking through billboards.

==== Need for Speed Rivals (2013) ====
Need for Speed: Rivals was developed by Ghost Games (formerly EA Gothenburg) in association with Criterion Games, and was released in 2013 for the PlayStation 4, Microsoft Windows, PlayStation 3, Xbox 360, and Xbox One. It runs on DICE's Frostbite 3 Engine. It has the same basic concept as Need for Speed: Hot Pursuit, but with new features like the AllDrive system, and several pursuit techs.

==== Need for Speed: No Limits (2015) ====
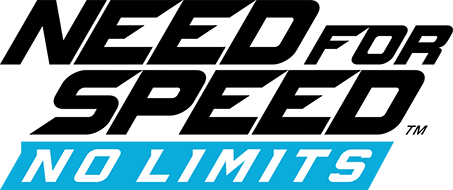
Need For Speed: No Limits logo

Need for Speed: No Limits was released in 2015 for iOS and Android, and a mobile installment in the Need for Speed video game series, developed by Firemonkeys Studios and published by Electronic Arts. It is the franchise's first original title made exclusively for mobile devices, unlike past mobile games in the series that were simply adaptations of various Need for Speed games.

==== Need for Speed (2015) ====
A full reboot of the franchise developed by Ghost Games, the game was released in 2015 for PlayStation 4 and Xbox One, with a release for Microsoft Windows via Origin in 2016.

Set in Ventura Bay, the game has five different gameplay styles in which points are collected in order to progress through five overlapping storylines, in addition having a redesigned 'Wrap Editor' and body car modifications.

The PC version was released in 2016 via Origin in two different editions. The Standard Edition is the base edition, whereas the Deluxe Edition has the styling pack, performance pack, tricked-out starter car, exclusive wraps, unique identifying stickers, VIP icons, and a lifetime discount on all items using the in-game currency.

==== Need for Speed Payback (2017) ====
EA and Ghost Games released Need for Speed Payback in 2017 for Microsoft Windows, PlayStation 4, and Xbox One. The game has an offline single-player mode unlike the previous title. Payback is set in Fortune Valley. The game is focused on "action driving" and has three playable characters (each with different sets of skills) working together to pull off action movie-like sequences, in addition having a 24-hour day-night cycle.

==== Need for Speed Heat (2019) ====
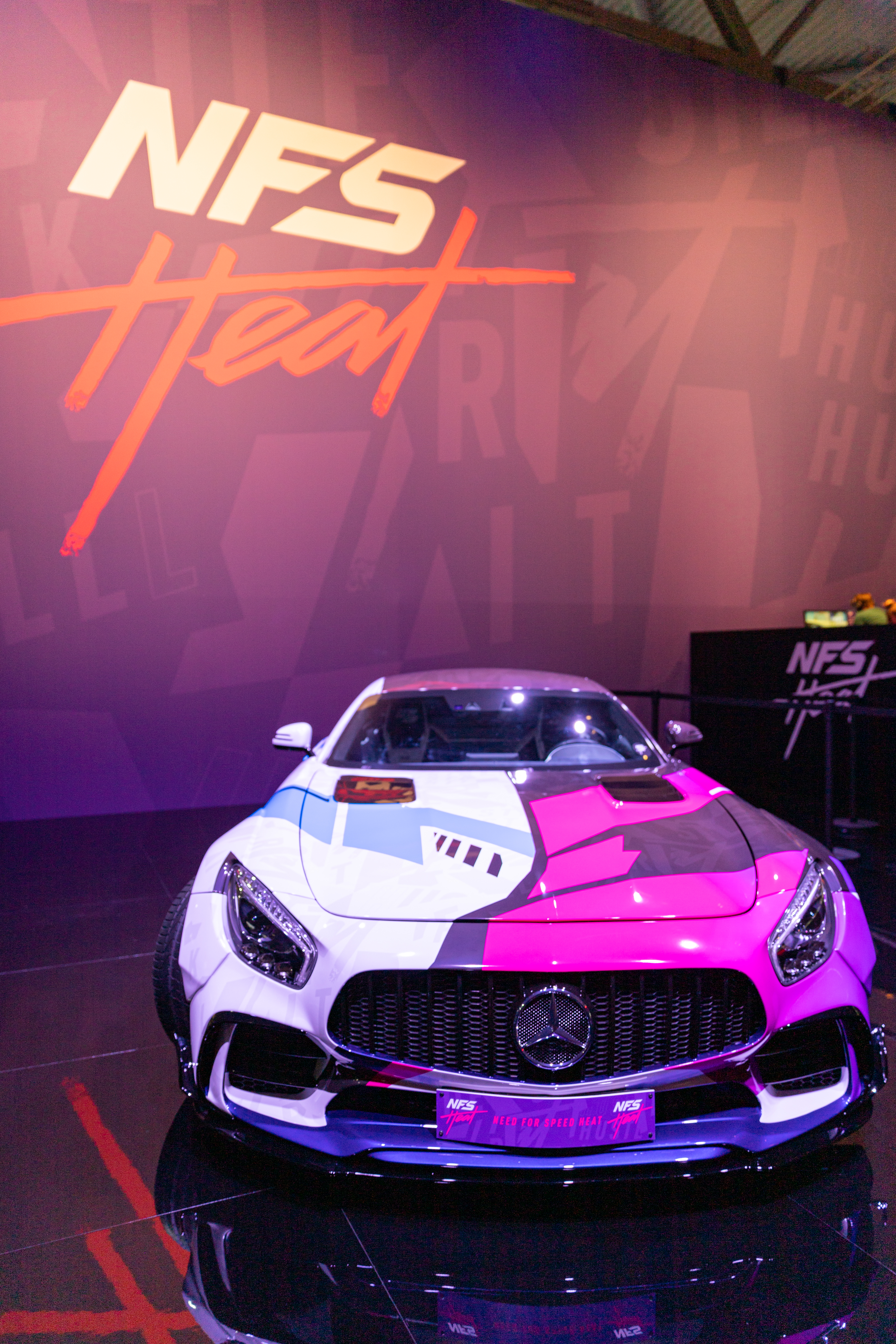
NFS Heat booth at Gamescom

Need for Speed Heat was released in 2019 for Microsoft Windows, PlayStation 4 and Xbox One. The game is set in Palm City. Unlike the previous title, which featured a full day-night cycle, the time of day can be switched when needed between a day and night period, with each period offering different races and payouts. Heat is similar to other titles and features a "Heat" system in which players earn rep when participating in police pursuits, with greater amounts offered during night than in the day. This was the last title released by Ghost Games before its dissolution in 2020, after which Criterion took full creative oversight of the franchise.

==== Need for Speed Unbound (2022) ====
Revealed by EA in October 2022, Need for Speed Unbound is developed by Criterion with assistance from Codemasters. The game features a cel-shaded art style for its characters and vehicle effects while retaining the photo-realistic look of the cars from previous games. The map is based in a fictional city inspired by Chicago called Lakeshore City. The game was released on the PlayStation 5, Xbox Series X/S and PC on December 2, 2022. American rapper ASAP Rocky appears as a character in the storyline, driving a modified Mercedes 190E.

=== Other games ===
==== Need for Speed: V-Rally (1997) ====
When V-Rally was released in 1997, it was developed by Infogrames Multimedia and had no connection with the Need for Speed games. Electronic Arts acquired the rights to publish the PlayStation version of the game in the United States in order to help sales of the game, due to the fact that rally racing held little support in the U.S. The game was not originally intended to be part of the Need for Speed series; neither the game's development was done by Electronic Arts Canada (which at the time was the primary developer of the Need for Speed series), nor was it developed in as association with Electronic Arts in any way. Later versions of the game were solely published by Infogrames and were released under their original names.

==== Need for Speed: V-Rally 2 (1999) ====
Much like with the original V-Rally, EA purchased the rights to publish the PlayStation version of V-Rally 2 in North America. Infogrames published the Dreamcast version of the game in North America as Test Drive: V-Rally. Later games in the series would have no connections to either Need for Speed or Test Drive.

==== Need for Speed: Web Racing (2001) ====
Need for Speed: Web Racing was an online-only conversion of Need for Speed III: Hot Pursuit made available in 2001 as part of EA.com's Platinum service. 11 cars and various courses from Need for Speed III were included, as well as one course from the first Need for Speed. Single-player and Multiplayer modes were made available.

==== Motor City Online (2001) ====
Originally conceived as part of the Need for Speed series under the title Need for Speed: Motor City, during development all single-player elements would be discarded in favor of an online-only model. The result, Motor City Online, was a racing MMO game released by EA on October 29, 2001. The point of the game was to buy classic cars, tune them, and race them against other players. The game went offline less than two years later to enable EA to focus on The Sims Online. Later, EA would develop a new online racing game, called Need for Speed: World.

==== Need for Speed: Top Speed (2002) ====
Need for Speed: Top Speed was an online-only promotional racing game released on October 1, 2002, as part of EA Pogo and America Online's online-only AOL Games' First Play programming initiative. Made to promote both MacGillivray Freeman's 2002 IMAX film Top Speed and the then-new Porsche Cayenne Turbo, the game uses three existing courses from Porsche Unleashed renamed to refer to Canadian locations due to the sponsorship of Travel Alberta Canada.

==== Need for Speed: Underground Rivals (2005) ====
Need for Speed: Underground Rivals was released for the PlayStation Portable (PSP) in 2005 in Japan in February, the United States in March, and Europe in September. In terms of design, the game was very similar to the Underground series, allowing players to select and drive cars acquired in the garage, as well as customize them (car parts, spoilers, etc.). The game featured a couple of new musical tracks, and some others from previous Need for Speed games.

==== Need for Speed: Most Wanted 5-1-0 (2005) ====
Need for Speed: Most Wanted 5-1-0 is a PlayStation Portable spin-off of Most Wanted, released on the same day as its console and PC counterpart. Similar to Most Wanted, Most Wanted 5-1-0 features a similar 15-number blacklist and Career mode, with the addition of Tuner Takedown, a "Be the Cop" mode not found in Most Wanted. Most Wanted 5-1-0 lacks many elements of its console and PC counterparts, such as cutscenes, a storyline, and a free-roam mode, and contains minor differences (including the inclusion of a blacklist racer's real name instead of their nickname). The game's title is based on the numbers 5-1-0, which is the police code for street racing.

=== Cancelled games ===
==== Need for Speed 64 (canceled) ====
In the late 1990s, EA Canada partnered with Paradigm to work on an entry in the series for the Nintendo 64. It was described in the Next Generation magazine as having exclusive tracks and vehicles, Rumble Pak support and the series' trademark gameplay mechanics. The game was ultimately canceled between late 1998 and early 1999. Electronic Arts had signed a deal with Volkswagen to make a game around the New Beetle, thus altering the Need for Speed 64 project into Beetle Adventure Racing.

==== Need for Speed: Ferrari (canceled) ====
At the time of the beginning of the development of Porsche Unleashed, Electronic Arts was planning to make similar games with Ferrari and BMW. Because EA Canada would develop Porsche Unleashed, EA Seattle was counting on developing the Ferrari game, although this idea was canceled even before the release of Porsche Unleashed.

==== Need for Speed 10: TerrorFive (canceled) ====
Need for Speed 10: TerrorFive was a concept pitched to Electronic Arts around 2008. The portfolio page of a former presentation director of EA Black Box says the "goal" of the game was to answer the question "How can large scale street races take place in a post 911 US city?" Concept art depicts a group of street racers named "TerrorFive", alongside a mockup of gameplay in which players seemingly hack into police cars.

==== Need for Speed: Millionaire (canceled) ====
Need for Speed: Millionaire was a canceled online-only entry developed by Criterion Games, which started development around 2008 after the release of Burnout Paradise and Need For Speed: Undercover. It would have seen the player and friends go on adventures after a lottery win and the purchase of many supercars, described by Criterion director Alex Ward as "Freeburn meets Top Gear challenges". The game was worked on for six months and had a playable version, but was canceled in favor of Need for Speed: Hot Pursuit.

=== Outside American market games ===
==== Need for Speed: Edge ====
Need for Speed: Edge was a free-to-play MMO racing game developed by EA Spearhead (formerly EA Korea) and published by Nexon from South Korea and Tencent Interactive Entertainment (known as Need for Speed Online) from China. It is the third free-to-play game in the franchise overall, along with being the only free-to-play racing game that runs on the Frostbite 3 game engine. The PC version is based on the 2013 title Need for Speed Rivals, while the mobile version (sometimes referred to as Need for Speed: Duel) is based on Need for Speed: No Limits. Released on December 14, 2017. Nexon shut down the game on May 30, 2019.

==== Need for Speed Mobile (2024) ====
Need for Speed Mobile (known as Need for Speed: Assemble in China, Taiwan, Hong Kong and Macau) is a free-to-play open world racing mobile game developed by TiMi Studios and published by Electronic Arts for worldwide and Tencent Interactive Entertainment for China and Garena for Taiwan, Hong Kong and Macau. The game runs on the Unreal Engine 4, this is the first and also only game which runs on Unreal Engine in the series. The game released on July 11, 2024 in China, and released on October 31, 2024 in Taiwan, Hong Kong and Macau.

== Film adaptation ==
EA worked with DreamWorks Pictures to create a film version of Need for Speed starring Aaron Paul as Tobey Marshall, a mechanic and street racer who was framed by a wealthy business associate. The movie was released by Disney's Touchstone Pictures on March 14, 2014, months before the franchise's 20th anniversary. Despite receiving negative reviews, the film ended up grossing over $200 million at the worldwide box office.

In April 2015, a sequel was reported to be produced by China Movie Channel, Jiaflix, and 1905.com in association with EA Games.
