= Need for Speed (2015 video game) =

2015 racing video game

- Standard edition box art with a Subaru BRZ and Porsche 911 Carrera RSR 2.8 (Note: The five men on the top of the box are the game's "icons"; they are (from left to right on the cover) Shinichi Morohoshi, Ken Block, Akira Nakai, Magnus Walker, and (representing Risky Devil) Richard "Fish" Fisher.)
- Developer: Ghost Games (Note: Additional work by Criterion Games and Visceral Games)
- Publisher: Electronic Arts
- Director: Craig Sullivan
- Producer: Leanne Loombe
- Designer: James Mouat
- Programmer: Jonathan Janesjö
- Writers: James Worrall; Justin Trefgarne; Adrian Vershinin
- Composer: Photek
- Series: Need for Speed
- Engine: Frostbite 3
- Platforms: PlayStation 4 Xbox One; Windows
- Release: PlayStation 4, Xbox One: NA: 3 November 2015; PAL: 5 November 2015; Windows: WW: 15 March 2016
- Genre: Racing
- Modes: Single-player, multiplayer

Need for Speed is a 2015 online racing video game developed by Ghost Games and published by Electronic Arts. The game was released for PlayStation 4 and Xbox One in November 2015, while a Windows version released in March 2016. It is the twenty-second Need for Speed installment, and serves as a reboot of the franchise.

Need for Speed received mixed reviews from critics, who praised the game's visuals and customization but criticized it for being always-online with the inability to pause, which would also lead to performance issues on all platforms. The game was succeeded by Need for Speed Payback in 2017.

== Gameplay ==
The first gameplay footage of the pre-alpha build for Need for Speed was revealed at EA's press conference at E3 on June 15, 2015. The E3 presentation shows a part of the story, followed by the customization of a Subaru BRZ which showed the new and improved customization system, and the 'action camera' which was later revealed to be one of the five different camera angles. There are five different gameplay types: Speed, Style, Crew, Build, and Outlaw where players can earn points for engaging in to progress in the game through five overlapping storylines. Need for Speed takes place in the fictional city of Ventura Bay, California, and its surroundings which is based on Los Angeles.

Need for Speed has a redesigned 'Wrap Editor', and body modifications return to the series after nearly five years. The game features real-life tuning companies including RAUH-Welt Begriff, SEIBON, and RTR Mustang. A new 'Handling Slider' was exhibited in the E3 gameplay video, which combines the best elements of the earlier Black Box titles' grippy tires, as well as the drift style of the newer Criterion titles.

== Plot ==
The story revolves around the player and a small ragtag group of racers waiting to be noticed by any of the game's five icons, all of them being real-world motorsport and street racing figures. Spike (Adam Long) wants to meet Magnus Walker, Amy (Faye Marsay) has a desire to greet Akira Nakai, Robyn (Christina Wolfe) wants to come to Risky Devil, Manu (Howard Charles) wants to impress Ken Block, and Travis (Leo Gregory) is inspired by Shinichi Morohoshi. As the game progresses, the player earns money and reputation among the other drivers and people he meets along the way. As soon as the player defeats Magnus Walker, however, a cutscene appears in which an angry and jealous Spike berates the player for getting the chance before Spike did. After this, Spike gets over it because of Travis saying to him that if one of them gets noticed, they all get noticed. Once the player becomes the ultimate icon, the final challenge is against Travis, Spike, Amy, Robyn, Manu, and the icons. After the race, the final cutscene includes all of them taking a group photo together, with the player wearing a mask to hide his true identity.

== Development ==
Following the 2010 release of Need for Speed: Hot Pursuit, EA's own developer Criterion Games, developers of the award-winning racing video game series Burnout, was given stewardship of the Need for Speed franchise with 2012's Need for Speed: Most Wanted. In a 2012 interview, Most Wanted executive producer Matt Webster told that while all future Need for Speed games may not be developed by Criterion, the studio would have creative oversight of the franchise moving forward.

After just one year later, during a Gamescom interview with Need for Speed Rivals executive producer Marcus Nilsson told that the newly created Ghost Games studio was now in charge of the franchise; about 80 percent of Criterion was working on Rivals with the remaining group working on a mysterious "new project." A month later, vice president and creative director of Criterion Games, Alex Ward announced that 60 to 65 people moved from Criterion over to Ghost Games UK, seemingly permanently, to work on Rivals and the franchise, leaving about 20 at Criterion.

In April 2013, Electronic Gaming Monthly published a report that a reboot of 2004's Need for Speed: Underground 2 could be the next NFS game; that report was contradicted hours later by Criterion's Alex Ward. Initially it was suspected that Criterion would not be developing racing games in the short-term, but Ward clarified that he was speaking personally instead of speaking for the studio. In a 2013 interview with VideoGamer, Ghost's Marcus Nilsson stated that they were working to restore the credibility of the franchise. He also suggested a sequel to 2004's Underground 2 if the conditions were right. Later in the year, at the Eurogamer Expo, Nilsson hinted that the franchise might return to a style of progression in the future similar to the Underground - Most Wanted - Carbon series.

In 2014, Electronic Arts CEO Andrew Wilson announced that there wouldn't be a new Need for Speed game that year, making it the first year since 2001 that a Need for Speed game was unreleased.

On 21 May 2015, EA announced their next Need for Speed game, with a teaser trailer, following marketing material tease days before. EA later clarified that the new Need for Speed game is not really a spiritual Underground 3 game, but it would still "share a lot of the stuff that made that game great".

On 29 May 2015, EA confirmed that Need for Speed would require an online connection to play, but reassured that "the benefits are nice" for requiring such restriction. Previous Need for Speed games have featured connected online worlds for players to race and inhabit together, although they have not required a player to stay connected to play the game. This was met with criticism from critics, who pointed to 2013's SimCity, which was unplayable at launch as a result of requiring an online connection to play. The reason for an always-online internet connection was because of Autolog's new in-game snapshot feature explained by Marcus Nilsson which rewards the players and their snapshots with Rep Points, Experience Points and in-game money if other players liked them enough.

On 14 September 2015, Electronic Arts announced that Need for Speed for Windows had been delayed to Spring 2016 in order to allow Ghost Games to give the version an unlocked frame rate and increase the visual quality. The Windows release date has later been updated to a more precise 15 March in the US and 17 March everywhere else, and March 10 as a demo in the Origin access program. Along with that announcement, several other announcements were made, among which include Windows-exclusive support for 4K resolution, various gamepad and steering wheel controllers, and the previously announced unlocked frame rate, as well as a manual transmission option for both the PC and console versions.

The game is offered in two editions: the Standard Edition and the Deluxe Edition. The Deluxe Edition includes several extra features and content, such as a lifetime discount on all purchases made with in-game currency, a special VIP Icon, exclusive car wraps, more upgrades, and a pre-modified BMW M3 (E46) modeled after the M3 GTR from 2005's Need for Speed: Most Wanted as both the leading car on the game's cover and the player's tricked-out starter car that is in the garage next to the Honda Civic, the Subaru BRZ, or the Ford Mustang Foxbody in the "purchase your first car" menu.

The game has neither microtransactions of any sort nor paid DLC. All additional content is available for free through mandatory updates, leading the game to be called the "Living Game" by developers.

=== Post-release updates ===
On 13 November 2015, the first game update was teased. Dubbed the Icons Update, the update was released on 25 November 2015, and saw a maximum rep level increase to 60. The update also includes two new unlockable bonus cars, improvements on wrap editor, new daily challenges, community events and a few new preset wraps.

On 9 December 2015, Ghost Games released the Legends Update, which added (among other changes) songs from previous Need for Speed games, a maximum rep level increase to 70, new collectables and wraps, and the ability to mute phone calls. The update also introduced a new event series featuring Eddie and Melissa from Need for Speed: Underground. Upon completion of this event series, the player will unlock Eddie's 1999 Nissan Skyline GT-R V-Spec.

On 3 February 2016, Ghost Games released the Showcase Update, which added fully customizable license plates and the ability to share car wraps to friends or the community, in addition to repair shops and improvements on photo-taking features. On 3 March 2016, an update dubbed the Hot Rods Update was released, which added drag races, two hot rod cars, a manual transmission option, and an increase in the number of garage car slots from five to ten. On 24 March 2016, the 2017 facelift of the Nissan GT-R Premium (R35) was added to the game.

On 27 April 2016, the sixth and final update, the SpeedLists Update, was released, which introduced multiplayer tournament series, where players can compete against each other to earn SpeedPoints to raise their multiplayer rank. The update also introduced the new ability to replay story missions with increased difficulty through Prestige (unlocked by completing all story missions).

== Reception ==
=== Critical reception ===
Reception

Aggregate score
Aggregator	Score
Metacritic	(PC) 68/100 (PS4) 66/100 (XONE) 65/100

Review scores
Publication	Score
Destructoid	6/10
Electronic Gaming Monthly	7/10
Game Informer	7/10
GameRevolution	3.5/5
GameSpot	8/10
GamesRadar+	3/5
GameTrailers	8.3/10
Giant Bomb	2/5
IGN	6.3/10
VideoGamer.com	5/10

Need for Speed received "mixed or average" reviews, according to review aggregator website Metacritic.

Luke Reilly of IGN gave the game a score of 6.3 out of 10, praising the game's great visuals and sound and the drifting feeling, but criticizing the game's story, the game being too brief, the multiplayer, AI, daft time-of-night effects, having no drag racing, and no ability to pause the game. Alexander Kalogianni of Digital Trends awarded Need for Speed a score of 6.0 out of 10, praising the game for its gorgeously stylized game world, multitude of tweakable car characteristics, engaging visual, customization options, and cool soundtrack, but criticized it for repetitive mission types and the AI being aloof.

Scott Butterworth of GameSpot gave the game an 8 out of 10. Butterworth praised Need for Speed for the visually stunning city, deep rewarding progression, genuinely customizable handling, and nail-biting sense of speed, but at the same time criticized the rubber-banding AI, draconian drift scoring system, and always-online, rendering the game unable to be paused. Sam Loveridge of TrustedReviews gave Need for Speed 4½ out of five stars giving praise to the stunning night racing and weather effects, but panned the inability to play offline, the inability to pause gameplay, and the "insufferable" live action cutscenes and constant calls.

Despite the mixed reception, the Academy of Interactive Arts & Sciences nominated Need for Speed for "Racing Game of the Year" during the 19th Annual D.I.C.E. Awards.

=== Sales ===
The Need for Speed reboot had 67% of copies sold on PS4, with 33% on Xbox One. Need for Speed was the seventh best selling game in the United States in November 2015 according to the NPD Group. The game debuted at #6 on the Japanese Sales Charts, selling 19,000 copies. In the UK, it reached number 2 in the sales chart, behind Call of Duty: Black Ops III.

On January 28, 2016, Need for Speed saw twice as many monthly active players in Q3 compared to Need for Speed Rivals.
