= EA Gothenburg =

Swedish video game developer

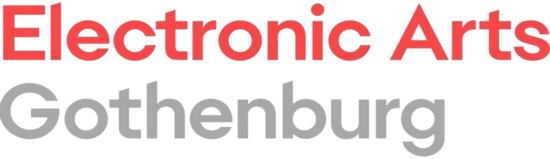
- Formerly: Ghost Games (2012–2020)
- Type: Subsidiary
- Industry: Video games
- Founded: 2011
- Headquarters: Gothenburg, Sweden
- Key people: Riley Cooper (creative director)
- Products: Need for Speed series (2013–2019)
- Number of employees: 85+
- Parent: EA Entertainment
- Website: www.ea.com/careers/careers-overview/gothenburg

EA Gothenburg (formerly known as Ghost Games) is a Swedish video game developer owned by Electronic Arts (EA) and located in Gothenburg. The studio used to have two other locations, one based in Guildford, England and another in Bucharest, Romania. From 2013 to 2020, they oversaw the development of the Need for Speed racing game franchise. Employees of Ghost include former staff members of EA DICE, Black Box, Criterion Games and Playground Games.

Need for Speed Rivals was the first title released as Ghost Games where they led development, with additional help from Criterion. Their most recent game Need for Speed Heat was released in November 2019. All games developed by the studio utilize the EA in-house Frostbite game engine. EA announced plans in February 2020 to return Ghost Games to an engineering support studio for all of EA, while moving the Need for Speed license back to Criterion.

== History ==
Initially established in 2011 as EA Gothenburg, it was reported that the studio would focus on the development of games using the Frostbite game engine and was developing a game in the Need for Speed franchise. According to the CVs of employees, much of the studio's staff had worked previously on major racing titles, including Forza Horizon, Need for Speed: The Run, Project Gotham Racing and Race Pro.

Ghost Games logo (2013–2020)

On 22 October 2012, the series' main developer at the time, Criterion Games, confirmed that EA Gothenburg was working on a title in the Need for Speed franchise, but did not reveal the level of involvement or when the title would be released. EA Gothenburg was re-branded as Ghost Games as of 15 November 2012. Ghost's website went live at the same time and called for potential staff to apply for a range of open positions. Ghost is headed up by former DICE executive producer Marcus Nilsson, who previously led development on games including Battlefield 2: Modern Combat, Battlefield 2142 and Shift 2: Unleashed.

EA confirmed the next title in the Need for Speed series, Need for Speed Rivals, with a teaser trailer on 23 May 2013, following marketing material teasers days before. It was also confirmed that the game was in development at EA's Ghost Games studio in partnership with Criterion Games and that Ghost Games would become the main developer of all future installments in the Need for Speed franchise starting from 2013. At the time, 80% of British developer Criterion Games staff moved to Ghost Games UK to help grow the studio. The game was released on 19 November 2013.

On 1 February 2014, multiple sources confirmed that studio-wide layoffs had occurred at Ghost Games UK. The same sources also confirmed that an unannounced Need for Speed title had been put on hold. Developers working with the studio under contract were immediately let go, while full-time employees were told to either take severance pay and leave the company or to join the team working on Visceral Games' Battlefield spinoff, Battlefield Hardline, due for release the following year.

In 2014, Electronic Arts CEO Andrew Wilson announced that there would not be a new Need for Speed game that year, making it the first year since 2001 that a Need for Speed game was not released. Ghost Games revealed their next game in the franchise on 21 May 2015, through a teaser trailer. The game, titled Need for Speed, was a formal reboot of the Need for Speed franchise. The game released on 3 November 2015 and received mixed reviews.

As of January 2016, Ghost Games had begun development on the next Need for Speed game to be released in 2017. Electronic Arts later confirmed in their January 2017 earnings call that the next game in the franchise was in development and was set to be launched during EA's fiscal year 2018 (Comprising from April 2017 to March 2018). On 2 June 2017, EA and Ghost Games revealed Need for Speed Payback. The game released worldwide on 10 November 2017, and unlike its predecessor, had a strong focus on offline singleplayer gameplay.

On 5 February 2019, EA CFO and COO Blake Jorgensen confirmed during the company's Q3 FY19 Financial Results Meeting that the publisher was planning on delivering a new entry in the Need for Speed series. The game is expected to be released before the end of March 2020. On 14 August, it was announced the game will be titled Need for Speed Heat and is scheduled to be released on 8 November 2019.

EA announced in February 2020 that it planned to move core development duties of the Need for Speed series back to Criterion Games, and make Ghost Games an engineering support studio across all of EA, renaming the studio back to EA Gothenburg once government approvals had cleared. This included a reduction in staff, with those familiar with EA's core technology such as the Frostbite engine to remain at the studio, and assigning the other creative staff from Ghost Games elsewhere within EA where possible.

== Games developed ==
Year	Title	Platform(s)	Notes
2013	Need for Speed Rivals	Microsoft Windows, PlayStation 3, PlayStation 4, Xbox 360, Xbox One	In collaboration with Criterion Games
2015	Need for Speed	Microsoft Windows, PlayStation 4, Xbox One	Additional work by Criterion Games and Visceral Games
2017	Need for Speed Payback	Microsoft Windows, PlayStation 4, Xbox One	Additional work by Lucid Games
2019	Need for Speed Heat	Microsoft Windows, PlayStation 4, Xbox One	From February 2020, Criterion Games took over post-launch development
