= Need for Speed Payback =

2017 racing video game

- Cover art featuring a Nissan Skyline R34 GT-R V·Spec, BMW M5 and Chevrolet Bel Air Sport Coupe 265 V8 escaping from the police
- Developer: Ghost Games (Note: Additional work done by Lucid Games)
- Publisher: Electronic Arts
- Director: William Ho
- Producers: Jeremy Chubb; Patrick Honnoraty; Johan Peitz; John Wikberg
- Designer: Riley Cooper
- Programmer: Jonathan Janesjö
- Artist: Abdul Khaliq
- Writers: Daniel Roy; Zack Betka; Ben Blumenthal; Mikael Hedberg
- Composer: Joseph Trapanese
- Series: Need for Speed
- Engine: Frostbite 3
- Platforms: PlayStation 4 Windows; Xbox One
- Release: November 10, 2017
- Genre: Racing
- Modes: Single-player, multiplayer

Need for Speed Payback is a 2017 racing video game developed by Ghost Games and published by Electronic Arts. It was released for PlayStation 4, Windows, and Xbox One on November 10, 2017. It is the 23rd installment in the Need for Speed series. The campaign of Payback revolves around a crew of racers working together to bring down a cartel named "The House", who control Fortune Valley, the game's take on Las Vegas, Nevada.

Upon release, Payback received mixed reviews from critics, who welcomed the return of offline gameplay modes, but criticized the game's loot box mechanics and use of microtransactions. The game was succeeded by Need for Speed Heat in 2019.

== Gameplay ==
Need for Speed Payback is a racing game set in the open world environment of Fortune Valley; a fictional version of Las Vegas, Nevada. It is focused on "action driving" and has three playable characters (each with different sets of skills) working together to pull off action movie-like sequences. The game features an offline single-player mode. Unlike the 2015 Need for Speed reboot, Payback features a 24-hour day-night cycle. Numerous activities are available throughout Fortune Valley for players to complete, including speed traps, speed zones, long jumps, billboard smashes, and drift zones, and players can collect casino chips scattered across the map.

Events include street races and drag races, both handled by Tyler, off-road races and drift events, both handled by Mac, and runner work, which is handled by Jess, all of which rewards players with bank and REP. Before starting an event, "side bets" are given to players which give them extra bank in exchange for some if they complete it. Unlike previous installments, where police chases are a staple of the series, players do not accumulate "heat" after completing events, and police cars do not roam the map in search of players. Police chases are instead triggered by scripted events during the campaign and pursuit boxes found around Fortune Valley. Previously, Rav was able to contact the player regarding abandoned cars scattered across the map during a given time period, which would also trigger police chases; if the player manages to return to a safehouse with the car, they will be able to keep it. This made the Ford Crown Victoria Police Interceptor playable, the first time since Need for Speed Rivals that a police car was a playable vehicle. Abandoned car rotations ended shortly before Need for Speed Heat's release.

The player's garage is divided into different racing disciplines, which include racing, drifting, drag builds, off-roading, and runner work, with speedcross being added in a post-launch update. As such, cars will need to be purchased from their respective dealerships. Derelict cars are scattered across the map, and obtaining all parts will allow the player to restore it; a derelict car can be restored further into a "superbuild" made for a specific discipline. The player starts with a limited amount of car storage space, but unlocking all the garages with bank will allow them to store unlimited cars. The game's upgrade system moves away from buying parts outright in the previous title to cards that may feature a boost to a car's trait(s). Matching three or six cards with the same brand will result in a bonus being applied. Cards are obtained from "shipments" or being bought outright from one of the Tune-Up-Shops available in the map. Vehicle customization is mostly the same as in the 2015 title, though new vanity items will need to be obtained through "shipments" instead of being bought outright. Payback features a total of 74 vehicles with downloadable contents. Toyota, Scion and Ferrari are not involved in the game due to licensing issues. However, the Subaru BRZ appears in the game. Aston Martin, Audi, Buick, Jaguar, Koenigsegg, Land Rover, Mercury, Pagani, and Plymouth make their return after their absence from the 2015 installment, while Alfa Romeo, Infiniti, Mini and Pontiac were added via downloadable content.

== Plot ==
Tyler "Ty" Morgan (Jack Derges), Sean "Mac" McAlister (David Ajala), Jessica "Jess" Miller (Jessica Madsen) and mechanic Ravindra "Rav" Chaudhry (Ramon Tikaram) are part of a crew in Silver Rock, Fortune Valley. Fixer Lina Navarro (Dominique Tipper) tasks them with stealing a precious Koenigsegg Regera belonging to Marcus "The Gambler" Weir. However, as Tyler arrives at the drop point, he finds Rav knocked out. Lina appears, revealing that she set up Tyler and his crew to take the fall for the stolen car and she drives away, leaving them at the mercy of the oncoming police force. Upon learning that Lina betrayed both of them, Weir initially considers leaving Tyler to be arrested, but instead protects him, planning their revenge.

Six months later, working as a valet for Weir, Tyler spots Lina threatening Weir to hand over the casino to The House, a cartel who controls Fortune Valley's underworld. Frustrated at the lack of progress, he decides to take matters into his own hands. Contacting The House as a racer, he enters and wins a race, despite Lina having rigged it for profit. Weir proposes Tyler a way to take down The House and Lina along with it. Tyler is to enter and win "The Outlaw's Rush", a massive street racing event that has the nation's top racers participating, which The House plans to rig for their own ends. Following the destruction of his home caused by Lina for ignoring her order during the fixed race, Tyler reassembles his old crew at an abandoned airfield. Tyler defeats the racing and drag leagues around Silver Rock, while Mac defeats the off-roading and drift leagues to gather new allies; allowing Tyler to enter "The Outlaw's Rush". Simultaneously, Jess infiltrates the House and learns of their plans to take over the entire city.

At "The Outlaw's Rush", Tyler, despite facing opposition with the racing leagues allied with the House, manages to win the street and off-road events with the help of all the race crews his crew allied with. Displeased with this, Lina challenges Tyler to a one-on-one race. Tyler wins the race, and Lina and "The Collector" are defeated, breaking the House's hold over Silver Rock. The crew celebrates their victory by driving back to the airfield.

In a post-credits scene, Mr. Kobashi, a customer whom Jess had driven, calls Weir and tells him his gamble worked, and that "The Collector" is finished. He welcomes Weir to Arkwright, the true power behind the House.

== Development ==
In January 2016, Ghost Games began development on the next Need for Speed game to be released in 2017. Electronic Arts later confirmed in their January 2017 earnings call that the next game in the franchise was in development and set to be launched during EA's fiscal year 2018 (comprising from April 2017 to March 2018).

== Reception ==
Reception

Aggregate score
Aggregator	Score
Metacritic	(PC) 62/100 (PS4) 61/100 (XONE) 61/100

Review scores
Publication	Score
Electronic Gaming Monthly	2/10
GameSpot	5/10
GamesRadar+	3.5/5
IGN	5.9/10
Polygon	6.5/10

Need for Speed Payback received "mixed or average" reviews from critics, according to review aggregator website Metacritic.

Luke Reilly of IGN praised Electronic Arts for repairing the problems of the game's predecessor, Need for Speed, but criticized its "scripted" story, lack of police chases during free roam, scripted police chases, loot box-like mechanisms during customization, poor car handling, unrealistic car damage and several other issues. PC World criticized the game for being full of microtransactions, the severely limited customizability of cars, gameplay mechanics, a lack of cockpit view and several more issues, and compared it harshly to the Forza Horizon series. GameRant ranked the game last in a ranking of every Need For Speed game.

According to The NPD Group, Payback was the eighth best-selling title in the United States in November 2017.

Year	Award	Category	Result	Ref.
2017	Game Critics Awards	Best Racing Game	Nominated	
2017	Gamescom 2017	Best Racing Game	Nominated	
2018	National Academy of Video Game Trade Reviewers Awards	Song Collection	Nominated	

== Soundtrack ==
The score for Need for Speed Payback was originally composed by the American composer Joseph Trapanese and includes 11 tracks. The game additionally features a soundtrack with 47 tracks from varying artists, with genres ranging from alternative rock to hip hop and rap.
