= Play Dead =

Play Dead may refer to:

== Film and television ==
- Play Dead (1983 film), a 1983 horror film
- Play Dead (2009 film), a 2009 black comedy film
- Play Dead (show), a 2010 Off-Broadway entertainment directed by Teller
- Play Dead (2022 film), a 2022 horror film
- Play Dead (upcoming film), an upcoming psychological thriller film

== Literature ==
- Play Dead (novel), a 1990 novel by Harlan Coben
- Play Dead, a 2013 novel by Bill James (novelist)
- Play Dead, a 2008 novel by Richard Montanari
- Play Dead, a 2016 novel by Angela Marsons

== Music ==
- Play Dead (band), an English gothic rock group
- "Play Dead" (song), by Björk
- "Play Dead", song by Andromeda from the album Manifest Tyranny, 2011
- "Play Dead", song by HIM from the album Dark Light, 2005
- Play Dead (Astrid album), 2001
- Play Dead (Amanda Richards album), 2012
- Play Dead (Mutemath album), 2017

== Other uses ==
- Playdead, video game development company

== See also ==
- Playing dead (disambiguation)
