= Mick Gordon =

Australian composer, producer, and sound designer

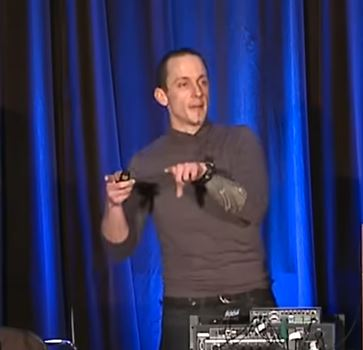
- Mick Gordon at GDC Festival conference 2017

Background information
- Born: Mackay, Queensland, Australia
- Occupations: Composer; sound designer; musician; record producer
- Years active: 2002–present
- Website: mick-gordon.com

Michael John Gordon is an Australian composer, record producer, musician, and sound designer, composing music primarily for video games.

Gordon has composed for several first-person shooters, including Atomic Heart, LawBreakers, Wolfenstein: The New Order, Wolfenstein: The Old Blood, Prey, the soft reboot of Doom and its sequel Doom Eternal, Wolfenstein II: The New Colossus, and the first two seasons of the 2013 fighting game Killer Instinct.

== Career ==
=== Video games ===
Gordon began his musical career as a jazz/blues guitarist in his teens. He first began to work as a sound designer with Pandemic Studios, where he contributed additional sound design for Destroy All Humans! 2. In 2013, he scored the first season of the fighting video game, Killer Instinct, a reboot of the original 1994 title. The following year, Gordon scored the second season of Killer Instinct and the action-adventure first-person shooter Wolfenstein: The New Order (developed by MachineGames). He returned to the Wolfenstein series in 2015 to compose the score for Wolfenstein: The Old Blood, a prequel to Wolfenstein: The New Order.

In 2016, Gordon completed the score for the science fiction first-person shooter, Doom, a soft reboot of the franchise, developed by id Software. His score for Doom won a number of awards including a D.I.C.E. Award for Outstanding Achievement in Original Music Composition, SXSW Gaming Award for Excellence in Musical Score, The Game Awards for Best Music/Sound Design, and was nominated for a BAFTA Games Award for Best Music.

In 2017, Gordon completed the score for the horror first-person shooter, Prey, developed by Arkane Studios. He also worked alongside Martin Stig Andersen to again return to the Wolfenstein series, scoring Wolfenstein II: The New Colossus, developed by MachineGames.

In 2020, Gordon completed the score of Doom Eternal; while the music for the game was once again well-received, circumstances around the soundtrack release led to a public falling out between Gordon and id Software and a parting of ways. Both sides posted open letters alleging wrongdoing.

=== Production work ===
On 23 June 2020 British rock band Bring Me the Horizon announced they would be working with Gordon on their upcoming release. Vocalist Oliver Sykes discusses how he fell in love with the Doom Eternal soundtrack during quarantine. Being heavily inspired by Gordon's work, the band decided to reach out to him and offer a collaboration. The resulting work, titled "Parasite Eve", was released on 25 June alongside an accompanying music video. The collaboration then expanded into the commercial release, Post Human: Survival Horror, released on 30 October 2020.

Gordon produced the song "Paralyze" with industrial metal band 3Teeth in 2021. On 3rd May 2023 3Teeth released "Merchant of the Void", and on 31st May released "Slum Planet" again collaborating with Gordon.

== Musical style and inspiration ==
According to Gordon's official website, he "utilises a broad range of modern musical sound design and traditional composition techniques in order to be unconstrained by any singular genre," and that it is "inspired by the connection between the audience and the experience."

Gordon's work "considers the role of music as a translation of the world in which it exists rather than a simple accompaniment."

== Discography ==
=== Soundtrack albums ===
Title	Release date	Label	Format
A Day in Pompeii	21 August 2012	Self-released	Digital download
Killer Instinct: Season One Soundtrack + Original Arcade Soundtrack	14 October 2014	Microsoft Corporation	CD, digital download
Wolfenstein: The New Order (Original Game Soundtrack)	19 May 2014	Bethesda Softworks	CD, digital download
Doom	28 September 2016	Bethesda Softworks	CD, digital download
Wolfenstein II: The New Colossus	16 March 2018	Bethesda Softworks	CD, digital download
Doom	27 July 2018	Bethesda Softworks	Vinyl

=== Production credits ===
Year	Artist	Album	Title(s)	Notes
2020	Bring Me the Horizon	Post Human: Survival Horror	"Dear Diary,"	Additional production
2020	Bring Me the Horizon	Post Human: Survival Horror	"Parasite Eve"	Additional production
2020	Bring Me the Horizon	Post Human: Survival Horror	"Obey" (with Yungblud)	Percussion, synthesizer, additional production
2020	Bring Me the Horizon	Post Human: Survival Horror	"Itch for the Cure (When Will We Be Free?)"	Additional production
2020	Bring Me the Horizon	Post Human: Survival Horror	"Kingslayer" (featuring Babymetal)	Additional production
2020	Bring Me the Horizon	Post Human: Survival Horror	"One Day the Only Butterflies Left Will Be in Your Chest as You March Towards Your Death" (featuring Amy Lee)	Additional production
2021	3Teeth	EndEx	"Paralyze" (featuring Ho99o9)	Production
2022	Monuments	In Stasis	—N/a	Co-production
2022	Motionless in White	Scoring the End of the World	"Scoring the End of the World"	Guest appearance
2023	3Teeth	EndEx	"Merchant of the Void"	Co-writer, co-production
2023	3Teeth	EndEx	"Slum Planet"	Co-production
2023	3Teeth	EndEx	"Higher Than Death"	Co-production
2023	3Teeth	EndEx	"What's Left"	Co-production
2023	Architects	The Sky, the Earth & All Between	"Seeing Red"	Additional Production
2024	Gravemind	Introsphere	"Failstate"	Guest appearance

== Works ==
Year	Title	Notes	Ref.
2006	Hot Dog King	Music and sound design	
2006	Destroy All Humans! 2	Additional sound design	
2007	Nicktoons: Attack of the Toybots	—N/a	
2008	El Tigre: The Adventures of Manny Rivera	—N/a	
2009	Real Racing	—N/a	—N/a
2009	Need for Speed: Shift	Co-composed with Stephen Baysted and Mark Morgan	
2009	Marvel Super Hero Squad	—N/a	
2010	Real Racing 2	Game sound effects	—N/a
2010	The Last Airbender	—N/a	
2010	Need for Speed: World	—N/a	
2010	Marvel Super Hero Squad: The Infinity Gauntlet	—N/a	
2011	Shift 2: Unleashed	Composed with: Heavy Melody Music; Ramin Djawadi; Troels Folmann; Stephen Baysted; Mike Reagan	
2011	Marvel Super Hero Squad: Comic Combat	—N/a	
2011	Need for Speed: The Run	Additional music	
2012	A Day in Pompeii	Audio director; Museums Victoria exhibit	
2012	Battle Group	Also sound designer	—N/a
2013	Real Racing 3	Game sound effects	—N/a
2013	ShootMania Storm	—N/a	
2013	Killer Instinct	Season One (2013) and Season Two (2014)	
2014	Wolfenstein: The New Order	Additional music by Frederik Thordendal	
2015	Wolfenstein: The Old Blood	Additional music by Michael Tornabene and Casey Edwards	
2015	Project CARS	Guitars with John J. Harvey	—N/a
2015	Soma	Trailers	
2016	Doom	Additional music by Chris Hite and Ben F. Carney	
2017	Prey	Additional music composed by Ben Crossbones, Matt Piersall, and Raphaël Colantonio	
2017	LawBreakers	Composed with Jaroslav Beck, Dieselboy, Mark The Beast, and Malcolm Kirby Jr. "Faust" and “Toska-9” tracks in the official album	
2017	Wolfenstein II: The New Colossus	Composed with Martin Stig Andersen; additional music by Frederik Thordendal	
2019	Borderlands 3	Additional music support Original game score by: Jesper Kyd; Michael McCann; Finishing Move Inc.; Raison Varner	
2020	Beautiful Desolation	—N/a	
2020	Doom Eternal		
2023	Atomic Heart	Composed with Andrey Bugrov and Geoffrey Day	
2023	Diablo IV	Music for Rogue Trailer	
2025	Absolum	Additional music support, with the song "Underking"; Original game score by: Gareth Coker	
2025	Routine	Additional sound design	
TBA	Defect		

== Awards and nominations ==
Year	Ceremony	Category	Work	Result
2006	Game Developers' Association of Australia	Best Audio	Destroy All Humans! 2	Won
2012	Game Audio Network Guild	Best Audio, Other	A Day in Pompeii	Won
2013	Game Audio Network Guild	Best Interactive Score	Killer Instinct	Nominated
2013	Game Audio Network Guild	Best Original Song, Vocal (Pop)	Killer Instinct ("Touch Me and I'll Break Your Face")	Won
2013	Game Audio Network Guild	Best Original Song, Vocal (Pop)	Killer Instinct ("I'm Back to Rise")	Nominated
2016	The Game Awards	Best Music/Sound Design	Doom	Won
2017	Game Developers Choice Awards	Best Audio	Doom	Nominated
2017	SXSW Gaming Awards	Excellence in Musical Score	Doom	Won
2017	D.I.C.E. Awards	Outstanding Achievement in Original Music Composition	Doom	Won
2017	British Academy Games Awards	Best Music	Doom	Nominated
2018	New York Game Awards	Best Music in a Game	Wolfenstein II: The New Colossus (shared with Martin Stig Andersen)	Nominated
2018	D.I.C.E. Awards	Outstanding Achievement in Original Music Composition	Wolfenstein II: The New Colossus (shared with Martin Stig Andersen)	Nominated
2020	The Game Awards	Best Score and Music	Doom Eternal	Nominated
2020	Steam Awards	Best Soundtrack	Doom Eternal	Won
