= Shift 2: Unleashed =

2011 racing video game

- European cover art featuring a Nissan GT-R GT1 and a Works conversion modified Maserati GranTurismo S
- Developers: Slightly Mad Studios; Straight Right (iOS)
- Publisher: Electronic Arts
- Producer: Marcus Nilsson
- Composers: Heavy Melody Music; Ramin Djawadi; Troels Folmann; Stephen Baysted; Mick Gordon; Mike Reagan
- Series: Need for Speed
- Platforms: Microsoft Windows; PlayStation 3 Xbox 360 iOS
- Release: Microsoft Windows, PlayStation 3 & Xbox 360: NA: March 29, 2011; EU: March 31, 2011; AU: March 31, 2011; UK: April 1, 2011; iOS: WW: August 4, 2011
- Genre: Racing
- Modes: Single-player, multiplayer

Shift 2: Unleashed (also known as Need for Speed: Shift 2 – Unleashed) is a 2011 racing video game, the seventeenth installment of the Need for Speed series. It was developed by Slightly Mad Studios and published by Electronic Arts. The game serves as a direct sequel to Need for Speed: Shift and expands on many aspects that were introduced in the original. Shift 2: Unleashed was released worldwide during March and April 2011.

Shift 2: Unleashed features over 145 cars from more than 37 manufacturers and over 36 different tracks, which players can compete in several types of races. Players can also compete online. The game also features three new main additions: an in-helmet camera, night-time racing and the Autolog feature introduced with Need for Speed: Hot Pursuit.

As of 2021, download versions of the game are no longer available for purchase in any online stores, and online play was shut down on September 1. The non-download boxed disk versions of the game can still be purchased from some online stores until supply runs out.

== Gameplay ==
Shift 2 claims to redefine the racing simulator genre by delivering authentic and true-to-life dynamic crash physics, intricately detailed real-world cars, drivers and tracks. During their careers, virtual racers partake in a variety of motorsports — like drifting, muscle car racing, retro car racing, Endurance races and circuit competition (i.e. FIA GT3 European Championship) — to hone their driving skills in hopes of becoming the FIA GT1 world champion.

In the career mode, Vaughn Gittin Jr., a Formula D Champion, guides the player through his career, customizing the car, Autolog, teaching the player how to drift (as well as becoming the rival on that branch), so the player would head on to the FIA GT3 and the Works series. Then, he begins to move on to the FIA GT1 World Championship. Gittin also will be the rival in the Muscle series. The career mode also features the Formula D driver Darren McNamara in Retro series, Chris Rado in Time Attack and Drag Racing (DLC) series, Eric and Marc Kozeluh in Standing Mile (DLC) series, Mad Mike Whiddett in the Works series, Patrick Söderlund in the FIA GT3 series, Tommy Milner in the endurance series, Matt Powers in the Legends (DLC) series, and Jamie Campbell-Walter in the FIA GT1 series. These racers even wager their own cars to the player as prize cars, should the player win their respective championships.

As well as an in-car camera view, Shift 2 includes a 'helmet-camera' in which the player's viewpoint is from their driver. The helmet cam moves with the head of the driver, being drawn from side to side as the car takes corners and jerking forward when the player crashes. As the car comes up to higher speeds, the edges of the screen will become blurred to simulate the tunnel-vision effect that drivers suffer when racing. Shift 2's night racing also appears to be more advanced, with headlights dimming or turning off completely if damaged, further narrowing the player's view.

The Autolog system is now 'Need for Speed DNA'. The system appears in Shift 2 in a more-or-less identical design to the original, but includes extra features that they not only provide track times for unique events, but also segregate data based on quick race tracks, race types and automotive disciplines. This essentially means that Autolog is more than just a system that simply displays player friend's times regardless of how, or when, they set them during their career.

Shift 2 features more than 140 licensed vehicles available for racing and tuning, a smaller number compared with racing sims such as Forza Motorsport 4, and the 1200 cars found in Gran Turismo 6. However, executive producer Marcus Nilsson said the studio wanted to concentrate on having only the must-have speedsters. There are also 40 real-world locations including Bathurst, Spa and Suzuka as well as fictional circuits like downtown London and Shanghai.

Lead designer Andy Tudor confirmed that Shift 2 doesn't feature split-screen: "There's so much going on in the game, for example we've added if you're drafting a guy now you'll get all the little bits of crap from his car, all the gravel and rubber hit the car and they can hit your windscreen and things like that. It takes a lot of development time but it's very authentic and that's the experience we want. Unfortunately that means things like split-screen aren't possible".

== Development ==
In early July 2010 it was rumored that a sequel for Shift was in development, called "Need for Speed: Shift 2" and to be developed by Slightly Mad Studios. In February 2010, EA said another Need for Speed game will be released at some point during its fourth quarter (January 1 through March 31, 2011). The rumors started when Chris McClure, who left Slightly Mad Studios for CCP, updated his profile on professional networking site Linkedin to include the work he had been doing prior to his departure. His CV read: "Mostly worked on new open world technology but also worked on Need For Speed Shift 2." Shift 2 was confirmed when EA listed the game in their first quarter financial report as a Q4 2011 title (i.e. Q1 2011 in calendar year) for consoles and PC.

The game was officially announced as Shift 2: Unleashed on November 16, 2010, with a teaser trailer, the same day as Hot Pursuit was released in the US . Shift 2 brings an "all-new" rendering engine and a "massive" graphics overhaul. "With an innovative helmet camera view simulating the physical experience of driving at 200mph, the thrilling experience of night racing and authentic degradation of tracks and cars, this is tomorrow's sim for today's adrenaline fuelled racer." said EA at the press time. "Shift 2 is redefining immersive racing by blending the rush of tearing up the track at unbelievable speeds with the emotional experience of competitive battle", said executive producer Marcus Nilsson. "We are also working closely with real-world performance drivers to ensure that Shift 2 Unleashed captures their experience and becomes the benchmark in authentic racing action." Two weeks before Shift 2 was announced did EA executive Patrick Soderlund said, "We think we can compete and ultimately become market leading in the simulation authentic motorsport segment. One of the strongest points we have is, apart from the fact we have a very talented developer working with us and we now have an established brand underneath the NFS umbrella in that segment, we also have the advantage of being a multi-platform offering. Forza can only be bought on Xbox and Gran Turismo is only available on PlayStation. We're the only one right now that is of a significant weight that can offer something up on all those platforms."

Marcus Nilsson, producer of the game, said that Shift 2 won't match Forza's 60 frames per second performance, but indicated it will be a far more vibrant game as a result. "You have to make a choice with today's tech. Either you go for – and this is harsh but it's what I think – the bland graphics of GT and Forza, or you try to push the bar for what consoles can do." said Nilsson.

EA's Patrick Soderlund revealed that he believes Shift 2: Unleashed can outdo Gran Turismo 5 when it comes to providing an "authentic driving experience". Both the lead designer and executive producer of Shift 2 spoke out against GT5, implying that it has way too many cars. Andy Tudor, lead designer of the game, said that games like Gran Turismo 5 and Forza Motorsport 3, were more like encyclopedias than games, and featured hundreds of "irrelevant cars". Tudor said "You can add hundreds of cars to your game, but people will ignore most of them."

Need for Speed producer Jesse Abney thought that Shift 2: Unleashed will cross the racing divide to entice arcade fans as well as sim fans. Regarding the first Shift, "'accessible' was used a lot, to the chagrin of simulation fans," the producer told NowGamer. "But you want those incremental steps to be a bit of a handholding exercise – Shift was developed as an acknowledgement that our fan base has grown up with us over 17 years. Their interests have changed. Some of them have grown up to become the race drivers we talk to today. They want that type of game. So we knew to acknowledge them and their interests, we really had to build an authentic racing game. And that's what Shift was."

Lead designer, Andy Tudor said Shift 2: Unleashed is injecting "emotional and social aspects" into the sequel, which take it beyond "being a numbers game". "The simulation genre, really, is just a numbers game at the moment; it's all about, 'We've got the greatest physics engine, and we're going to add 1,000 cars, tracks etcetera.' It's quite a dry experience. We want to turn that on its head, by adding in social features, such as Autolog. I've gone on record before saying GT5 and Forza are on pedestals at the moment: everyone believes they are the games to beat. They have great products, but they stop at being a numbers game, a mathematical simulation of great physics, whereas we go beyond that with the emotional and social aspects."

Marcus Nilson said that Autolog has changes since Hot Pursuit, "Yeah. You racing in the game becomes the fuel for other people to race, it's brilliant. Slightly Mad Studios has been working with Criterion from really early on exchanging ideas and executing on the core tenets that Criterion came up with. We're implementing it slightly differently but integrating more into the core experience of what the game is. I don't want the game to feel like I have a career and then I can go online to compete with my friends, I want it to feel like one whole. Autolog really weaves everything together into one compelling package. If you race this game and you beat people on your friends list, that's going to give you more XP to propel you in your career."

=== Spin-off ===
Marcus Nilsson, the executive producer of Shift 2: Unleashed, said this about why they decide to drop the Need for Speed name for Shift 2, "If you think about the Need for Speed games you've played; Need for Speed: Hot Pursuit, Most Wanted, Underground, they're very arcadey and action-oriented. Shift is going after a different audience, a sim audience, and it's about driving cars the way they feel in real life. So to not confuse the consumer – don't take me wrong, Shift 2: Unleashed is still a Need for Speed game inside the Need for Speed family, but that family has different legs. Hot Pursuit fits the action games; Shift 2 is sim-like."

EA wanted to establish Shift as a new franchise when Shift 2: Unleashed was released in March. The original was part of the Need for Speed family, but the sequel branches out in order to win over simulation racer fans and compete with genre rival Gran Turismo.

"Shift is still part of the Need for Speed family, but it offers a very different experience from our traditional Need for Speed action racers. With Shift 2: Unleashed, we aim to redefine sim racing so that fans get as close to the feeling of real racing as possible. Sim racers are proving very popular with consumers – F1 2010 and GT5 have done great numbers. The game will still embody the core values of Need for Speed, but we want to establish Shift as our clearly defined simulation racer. Our Need for Speed strategy is to create the best racing and driving experiences for all racing fans. The use of Shift as a franchise name is reflective of our desire to establish it as the best simulation racer in the market with its own unique, distinct positioning." EA's racing and action business lead Colin Blackwood told MCV.

== Soundtrack ==
Shift 2 Unleashed contains original soundtracks played during main menu, loading screen, and replay, composed by Ramin Djawadi, Stephen Baysted, Troels Folmann, Mick Gordon, and Mike Reagan.

== Marketing and release ==
The game was set for a release in North America on March 8, 2011, and in Europe on March 10, according to many websites, including GameStop and GameSpot. On January 13, EA announced that the game will be released on March 24, 2011, in Europe, on March 25 in UK and on March 29 in US. In a press release issued on February 18, 2011, EA mentioned the Shift 2: Unleashed's launch had been pushed back by a week in Europe to March 31 and in the UK to April 1.

In addition to the Standard edition, a Limited Edition of the game had been announced, which was originally available only through pre-order. The Limited Edition features numerous bonuses over the Standard edition, including exclusive packaging, instant access to three exclusive cars plus an additional 40 career race events. Coinciding with a shutdown of the Need For Speed Network on March 15, 2018, the Limited Edition content can no longer be unlocked on a new game or if a player's save file doesn't already contain the additional content. If a save file already contains the additional content, it will still work. The Limited Edition was removed from Origin and Steam online stores, but some other online stores still have the Limited Edition EA DVD for sale (only now it won't work).

Alpinestars and Need for Speed introduced the Play a Pro Sweepstakes, a contest that gives the winner chance to win a trip to attend the Formula Drift in Long Beach, California on April 8 and 9, 2011, available to residents of the United States only. The winner will receive a trip to Long Beach, California and pit passes to the Formula Drift in Long Beach and an opportunity to play against an Alpinestars drift driver in Shift 2: Unleashed.

EA had an exposition for Shift 2: Unleashed at PAX East 2011, where Shift 2: Unleashed had two D-Box racing seats set up each with its own 103" plasma TV, and several other stations. Pre-ordering Shift 2: Unleashed at PAX EAST, includes Shift 2: Unleashed branded ear bud head phones and a T-shirt as pre-order bonus.

=== Trailers ===
In addition to the trailer shown at the official reveal, four other game trailers have been released so far, each revealing new aspects of the game. One trailer promoted the launch date, which also shows the actual gameplay for the first time to public, an in-car racing sequence between McPhillamy Park to Forrest's Elbow at the Mt Panorama circuit, Bathurst. One trailer promoted the Limited Edition of the game. A Career trailer was released in the end of January 2011, which was the same day as the official website for Shift 2 launched. A video clip of Shift 2: Unleashed surfaced showing off a Team BMW race around a circuit in sunny Miami, the footage is from a GTTV show in which brand new gameplay was shown.

The first developer diary was released on February 23, 2011, which showcased a combination of some real-life racing and gameplay. It also explains how hard Slightly Mad Studios worked to rope in real life racer in order to flesh out the real life racing experience for the game. The video also shows off night-time racing, drifting, all new helmet camera, plus real-time telemetry, what the developer calls the "most realistic" physics engine ever used in a commercial racing video game. The second developer diary was released on March 7, 2011, which showcased the game's Autolog customization feature. The third developer diary was released March 10, 2011, which showcased some of the real world's most dangerous corners in racing.

Another trailer released was about the Pagani Huayra, which it is shown at high speeds in various circuits.

== Reception ==
Reception

Aggregate score
Aggregator	Score
Metacritic	PC: 84/100; PS3: 81/100; X360: 82/100 iOS: 72/100 iOS (iPad): 72/100

Review scores
Publication	Score
1Up.com	B+
Eurogamer	8/10
GameSpot	7.5/10
GamesRadar+	4.5/5
GamesTM	60%
GameTrailers	8.9/10
IGN	8.5/10
Play	66%
PSM3	66%
TouchArcade	iOS: 2.5/5

Shift 2: Unleashed was met with generally positive reviews. Aggregating review website Metacritic gave the PC version 84/100, the Xbox 360 version 82/100, the PlayStation 3 version 81/100.

GameTrailers rated the game an 8.9/10, saying how it "Refines the strengths of the first game and extends their value indefinitely through the competitive environment of autolog. There aren't any breakthrough new features here, but this is a racer that will constantly push you to improve and make you sweat under the pressure."

It gained an 8/10 rating from Eurogamer, stating: "As an update to the previous SHIFT title, Unleashed is a significant draft forward. While the driving itself retains the boisterous character of its predecessor, there's been a considerable tightening of focus in the experience system, which makes every race feel meaningful whether you win or lose."

It gained a 7.5/10 rating from GameSpot, stating how "Shift 2 may not offer full-on simulation features, but it boasts roller-coaster thrills and a deep sense of immersion in the hectic world of racing."

The game reached number 3 in the UK sales chart.
