= Martin Stig Andersen =

Danish composer and sound designer (born 1973)

- Born: 1973 (age 52–53)
- Genres: Ambient; industrial; video game music
- Occupations: Composer; sound designer
- Website: martinstigandersen.dk

Martin Stig Andersen (born 1973) is a Danish composer and sound designer, best known for his work on the video games Limbo and Inside, as well as contributions to Wolfenstein II: The New Colossus.

== Career ==
Andersen studied orchestral composition at the Royal Academy of Music in Aarhus, Denmark. After graduating in 2003, he went on to study electro-acoustic composition at City University in London. Andersen cited spectral composers such as Tristan Murail as inspiration.

In 2010, he served as composer and sound designer for Limbo, joining mid-development after an earlier sound designer left the project. For the game, Andersen focused on using abstract sounds to define the game's atmosphere. Following the release of Limbo, Andersen created and directed the audio for Inside and composed the soundtrack with SØS Gunver Ryberg, taking inspiration from 1980s horror films, often using synthesizers. The music was created by routing sound through a human skull, creating a "bone-conducting sound." As the game had closer integration between gameplay and audio, Andersen was more involved with the developers, with the player character's breathing being tied to the chest movement. Andersen was able to suggest changes to the game's structure, allowing the music to provide a coherent build-up. Anderson served as composer for Wolfenstein II: The New Colossus alongside Mick Gordon, which released in 2017. Gordon composed music portraying the resistance, while Andersen was tasked with composing music portraying the Nazis and convey the "oppressive marches of the machines." Andersen focused on using non-conventional structure and instruments, aiming for an industrial sound while collaborating with Nicolas Becker to create various foley sounds for the score.

== Works ==
Year	Title	Notes	Ref.
2006	Seven Tales of Misery	Performance installation	
2006	Ring Road A141	Short film	
2009	The Finish Line	Short film	
2010	Limbo	Also sound designer	
2012	Rocketman	Short film	
2016	Inside	Composed with SØS Gunver Ryberg; also audio director	
2017	Das Heuvolk	Performance installation	
2017	Wolfenstein II: The New Colossus	Composed with Mick Gordon	
2018	Shadow of the Tomb Raider	Ambient music design	
2019	Wolfenstein: Youngblood	Composed with Tom Salta	
2019	Control	Composed with Petri Alanko	
2021	Back 4 Blood	Composed with Nathan Whitehead	
2024	Braid: Anniversary Edition	Music and sound remastering with Hans Christian Koch	
2025	Cairn	Composed with Gildaa and The Toxic Avenger; also audio design	
2026	Order of the Sinking Star	Composed with Peter Due	

=== Albums ===
- Essential Tree Work (2001–2002)
- Sleepdriver (2004)
- Rabbit at the Airport (2006–2008)

== Awards and nominations ==
Year	Ceremony	Category	Work	Result	Ref.
2011	British Academy Games Awards	Best Use of Audio	Limbo	Nominated	
2011	Interactive Achievement Awards	Outstanding Achievement in Sound Design	Limbo	Won	
2016	The Game Awards	Best Music/Sound Design (shared with SØS Gunver Ryberg)	Inside	Nominated	
2017	D.I.C.E. Awards	Outstanding Achievement in Sound Design	Inside	Nominated	
2017	British Academy Games Awards	Best Music (shared with SØS Gunver Ryberg)	Inside	Nominated	
2017	British Academy Games Awards	Audio Achievement	Inside	Nominated	
2017	Game Audio Network Guild	Best Audio for an Indie Game	Inside	Won	
2017	Game Audio Network Guild	Audio of the Year	Inside	Nominated	
2017	Game Audio Network Guild	Best Interactive Score (shared with SØS Gunver Ryberg)	Inside	Nominated	
2017	Game Audio Network Guild	Best Audio Mix	Inside	Nominated	
2017	Game Audio Network Guild	Sound Design of the Year	Inside	Nominated	
2018	New York Game Awards	Best Music in a Game	Wolfenstein II: The New Colossus (shared with Mick Gordon)	Nominated	
2018	D.I.C.E. Awards	Outstanding Achievement in Original Music Composition	Wolfenstein II: The New Colossus (shared with Mick Gordon)	Nominated	
2020	D.I.C.E. Awards	Outstanding Achievement in Original Music Composition	Control (shared with Petri Alanko)	Won	
