= Limbo (video game) =

2010 video game

- Developer: Playdead
- Publishers: Microsoft Game Studios; Playdead
- Director: Arnt Jensen
- Producers: Dino Patti; Mads Wibroe
- Designer: Jeppe Carlsen
- Programmer: Thomas Krog
- Artists: Morten Christian Bramsen; Stine Sørensen
- Composer: Martin Stig Andersen
- Platforms: Xbox 360; PlayStation 3; Windows; OS X; Linux; Xbox One; PlayStation 4; PlayStation Vita; Nintendo Switch; iOS; Android
- Release: 21 July 2010: Xbox 360; WW: 21 July 2010; PlayStation 3; NA: 19 July 2011; EU: 20 July 2011; Windows; WW: 2 August 2011; OS X; WW: 21 December 2011; PlayStation Vita; WW: 4 June 2013; iOS; WW: 3 July 2013; Linux; WW: 23 June 2014; Xbox One; WW: 5 December 2014; Android; WW: 11 February 2015; PlayStation 4; WW: 24 February 2015; Nintendo Switch; WW: 28 June 2018
- Genre: Puzzle-platform
- Mode: Single-player

Limbo is a puzzle-platform video game with horror elements developed by independent studio Playdead and originally published by Microsoft Game Studios for the Xbox 360. The game was released in July 2010 on Xbox Live Arcade, and it has since been ported by Playdead to several other systems, including the PlayStation 3, Linux, Android and Microsoft Windows. Limbo is a 2D side-scroller, incorporating a physics system that governs environmental objects and the player character. The player guides an unnamed boy through dangerous environments and traps as he searches for his sister. The developer built the game's puzzles expecting the player to fail before finding the correct solution. Playdead called the style of play "trial and death" and used gruesome imagery for the boy's deaths to steer the player from unworkable solutions.

The game is presented in monochromatic tones, using lighting, film grain effects and minimal ambient sounds to create an eerie atmosphere often associated with the horror genre. Journalists praised the dark presentation, describing the work as comparable to film noir and German Expressionism. Based on its aesthetics, reviewers classified Limbo as an example of video games as an art form.

Limbo received critical acclaim, but its minimal story polarised critics; some critics found the open-ended work to have deeper meaning that tied well with the game's mechanics, while others believed the lack of a significant plot and abrupt ending detracted from the game. A common point of criticism from reviewers was that the high cost of the game relative to its short length might deter players from purchasing the title, but some reviews proposed that Limbo had an ideal length. The game has been listed among the greatest games of all time.

Limbo was the third-highest selling game on the Xbox Live Arcade service in 2010, generating around $7.5 million in revenue. It won several awards from industry groups after its release, and was named as one of the top games for 2010 by several publications. Playdead's next title, Inside, was released in 2016 and revisited many of the same themes presented in Limbo.

== Gameplay ==
A pre-release development screenshot, showing the boy crossing a dangerous chasm on a rope bridge. The game's art style and presentation have been consistent through the game's development cycle.

The player controls the boy throughout the game. As is typical of most two-dimensional platform games, the boy can run left or right, jump, climb onto short ledges or up and down ladders and ropes, and push or pull objects. Limbo is presented through dark, greyscale graphics and with minimalist ambient sounds, creating an eerie, haunting environment. The dark visuals also serve to conceal numerous lethal surprises, including such environmental and physical hazards as deadly bear traps on the forest floor, or lethal monsters hiding in the shadows. Among the hazards are glowing worms, which attach themselves to the boy's head and force him to travel in only one direction until they are killed.

The game's second half features mechanical puzzles and traps using machinery, electromagnets, and gravity. Many of these traps are not apparent until triggered, often killing the boy. The player is able to restart at the last encountered checkpoint, with no limits placed on how many times this can occur. Some traps can be avoided and used later in the game; one bear trap is used to clamp onto an animal's carcass, hung from the end of a rope, tearing the carcass off the rope and allowing the branch and rope to retract upwards and allow the boy to climb onto a ledge otherwise out of reach. As the player will likely encounter numerous deaths before they solve each puzzle and complete the game, the developers call Limbo a "trial and death" game. Some deaths are animated with images of the boy's dismemberment or beheading, although an optional gore filter on the Xbox 360 blacks out the screen instead of showing these deaths (although audio is still played), as well as removing or replacing hanging/dead children. Game achievements (optional in-game goals) include finding hidden insect eggs and completing the game with five or fewer deaths.

== Plot ==
The primary character in Limbo is a nameless boy in search of his sister, who awakens in the middle of a forest on the "edge of hell" (the game's title is taken from the Latin limbus, meaning "edge"), where he encounters a humongous spider who tries to kill him. After using a trap to cut off the sharp points on half of the spider's legs, it retreats further into the forest, and the boy is allowed to pass. However, he is later caught in webs and spun into a cocoon. Shortly after freeing himself, he encounters a colony of other boys who actively try to kill him with traps, and later poison darts; they later fall victim to their very own final traps, after the boy finally manages to kill the spider after a short chase. At one point during his journey, he encounters a female character, who he thinks might be his sister, but is prevented from reaching her. The forest eventually gives way to a crumbling city environment, followed by industrial and flooded environments. On completion of the final puzzle, the boy is thrown through a pane of glass and back into the forest area from the beginning. After he wakes up, he walks a short distance until he again encounters the girl, who, upon his approach, stands up startled. At this point, the screen cuts to black, abruptly ending the game.

== Development ==
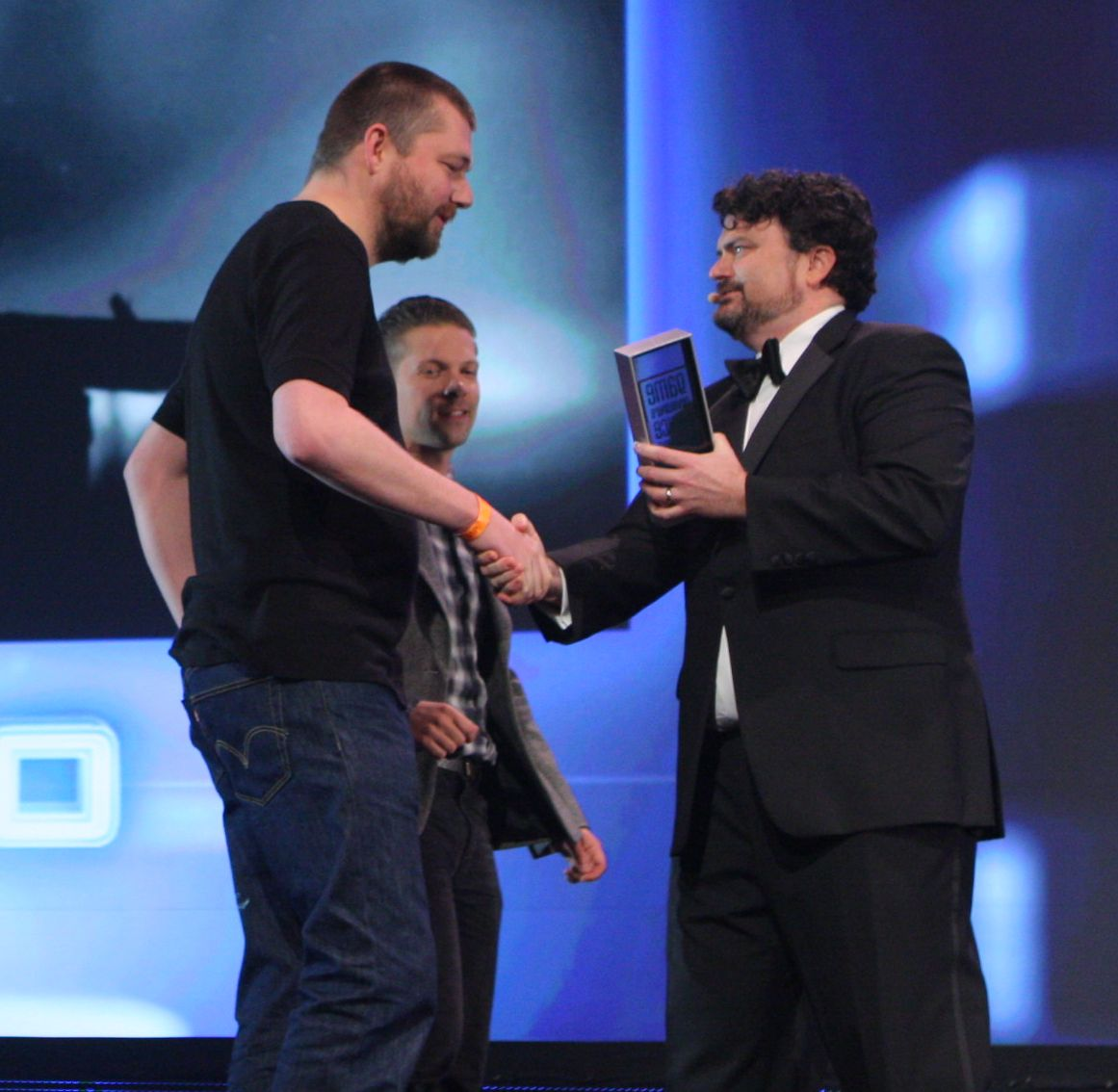
Arnt Jensen, game director of Playdead (left) and artist Morten Bramsen (back) receive the "Best Visual Art" award for Limbo from Tim Schafer at the 2011 Game Developers Choice Awards.

According to Playdead co-founder Dino Patti and lead designer Jeppe Carlsen, Playdead's game director, Arnt Jensen, conceived Limbo around 2004. At that time, as a concept artist at IO Interactive, Jensen became dissatisfied with the increasingly corporate nature of the company. He had sketched a "mood image" of a "secret place" to get ideas, and the result, similar to the backgrounds of the final game, inspired Jensen to expand on it. Jensen initially tried on his own to program the game in Visual Basic around 2004, but found he needed more help and proceeded to create an art style trailer by 2006. He had only intended to use the trailer as a means to recruit a programmer to help him, but the video attracted substantial interest in the project from across the Internet, eventually leading him to meet with Patti, who was also dissatisfied with his job. Their collaboration led to the founding of Playdead. Although Patti helped in the first few months with programming, he realised that the project was much larger than the two of them could handle, and Patti developed the business around the game's expanded development.

Initial development was funded personally by Jensen and Patti, along with Danish government grants, including funding from the Nordic Game Program, while large investors were sought later in the development cycle. Jensen and Patti did not want to commit to major publishers, preferring to retain full creative control in developing the title. Jensen originally planned to release Limbo as a free Microsoft Windows title, but by this point, Jensen and Patti decided to make the game a retail title.

Playdead chose to ignore outside advice from investors and critics during development, such as to add multiplayer play and adjustable difficulty levels, and to extend the game's length. According to Patti, Playdead felt these changes would break the integrity of Jensen's original vision. Patti also felt that the investors "tried to control the company with no usable knowledge or respect", citing that after Microsoft raised concerns about the death of the boy, "one of the investors suggested we make him appear older by giving him a moustache." Numerous iterations of the game took place during a 2 1/2-year development cycle, including changes Jensen had demanded to polish the title, some elements being added two months prior to the game's release. Patti stated that they "trashed 70%" of the content they had developed, due to it not fitting in well with the context of the game. The core development team size was about 8 developers, expanding to 16 at various stages with freelancers. Playdead developed the design tools for Limbo in Visual Studio; Patti commented they would likely seek third-party applications for their next project given the challenges in creating their own technology. Patti later revealed they had opted to use the Unity engine for their next project, citing the development of their custom engine for Limbo as a "double product, doing both engine and game", and that their Limbo engine is limited to monochromatic visuals.

=== Story, art and music direction ===
From the game's inception, Jensen set out three goals for the final Limbo product. The first goal was to create a specific mood and art style. Jensen wanted to create an aesthetic for the game without resorting to highly detailed three-dimensional models, and instead directed the art towards a minimalistic style to allow the development to focus its attention on the gameplay. Jensen's second goal was to only require two additional controls—jumping and grabbing—outside of the normal left-and-right movement controls, to keep the game easy to play. Finally, the finished game was to present no tutorial text to the player, requiring players to learn the game's mechanics on their own. The game was purposely developed to avoid revealing details of its content; the only tagline the company provided was, "Uncertain of his sister's fate, a boy enters Limbo." This was chosen so that players could interpret the game's meaning for themselves.

Some aspects of Limbo bore out from Jensen's own past, such as the forest areas that were similar to forests around the farm where he grew up, and the spider coming from Jensen's arachnophobia. Jensen drew inspiration from film genres, including works of film noir, to set the art style of the game; the team's graphic artist, Morten Bramsen, is credited with recreating that art style. Much of the game's flow was storyboarded very early in development, such as the boy's encounters with spiders and mind-controlling worms, as well as the overall transition from a forest to a city, then to an abstract environment. As development progressed, some of the original ideas became too difficult for the small team to complete. The storyline also changed; originally, the spider sequences were to be present near the end of the game, but were later moved to the first part. In retrospect, Jensen was aware that the first half of the game contained more scripted events and encounters, while the second half of the game was lonelier and puzzle-heavy; Jensen attributed this to his lack of oversight during the latter stages of development. Jensen purposely left the game with an open ending though with a specific interpretation only he knew, though noted after the game's release that some players, posting in forum boards, had suggested resolutions that were "scary close" to his ideas.

Limbo
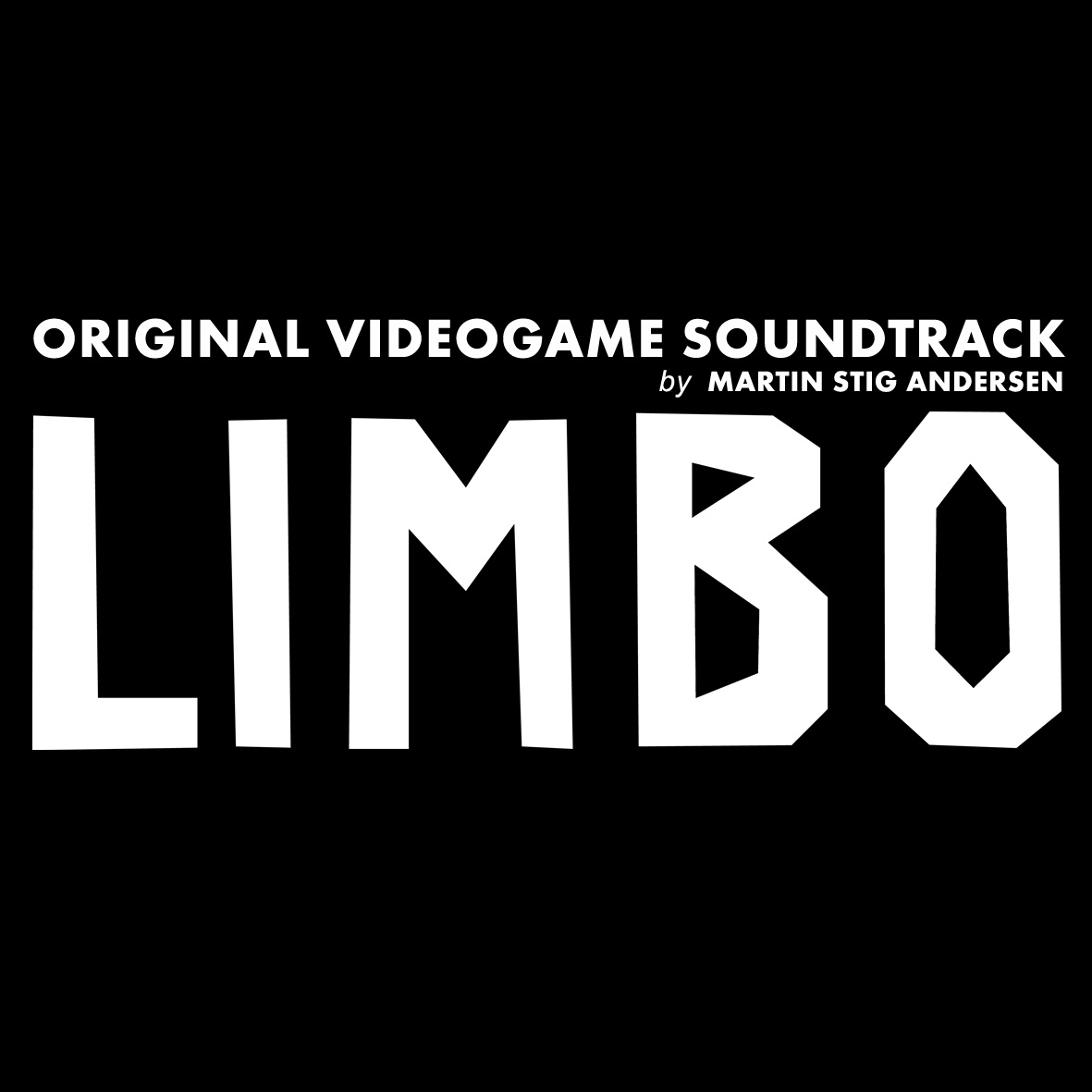

Soundtrack album by Martin Stig Andersen
- Released: 11 July 2011
- Genres: Acousmatic, ambient
- Length: 19:40
- Label: Playdead
- Producer: Martin Stig Andersen

The game's audio was created by Martin Stig Andersen, a graduate from the Royal Academy of Music in Aarhus. Andersen's specialisation was in acousmatic music, non-traditional music created from generated sounds that have no apparent visual source. He was drawn to work with Jensen on the game after seeing the initial trailer, having been drawn in by the expressions of the boy character; Andersen compared the early visuals to his acousmatic music: "you have something recognizable and realistic, but at the same time it's abstract". Andersen sought to create acousmatic music exclusively incorporating the sound effects of the game's environments. Two examples he pointed to were the use of electricity noises while in the presence of a ruined neon "HOTEL" sign, and silencing the wind sound as the spider approached the boy in the forest. Andersen avoided the use of easily recognizable sounds, distorting them when needed as to allow players to interpret the sounds' meanings for themselves. Andersen constructed most of the game's sounds through a number of "grains" instead of longer sound loops, allowing him to adjust the playback to give better feedback to the player without sounding repetitious; one example he cites was the use of separate sounds for the boy's toe and heel when they make contact with the ground, giving a more realistic sound for movement. Many reviews for the game stated that there was no music in Limbo, but Andersen countered that his sound arrangements helped to evoke emotions; the acousmatic music was intended to leave room for interpretation by the player in the same manner as the game's art and story. Andersen noted that this helps with immersion within the game by making no attempt to control the emotional tone; "if [the players are] scared it will probably make them more scared when there's no music to take them by the hand and tell them how to feel". Due to fans' requests, Playdead released the game's soundtrack on iTunes Store on 11 July 2011.

Limbo soundtrack track listing
| No. | Title | Length |
|---|---|---|
| 1. | "Menu" | 3:10 |
| 2. | "Boys' Fort" | 2:17 |
| 3. | "City" | 3:38 |
| 4. | "Rotating Room" | 3:02 |
| 5. | "Sister" | 3:21 |
| 6. | "Gravity Jump" | 4:12 |
| Total length: | | 19:40 |

=== Gameplay direction ===
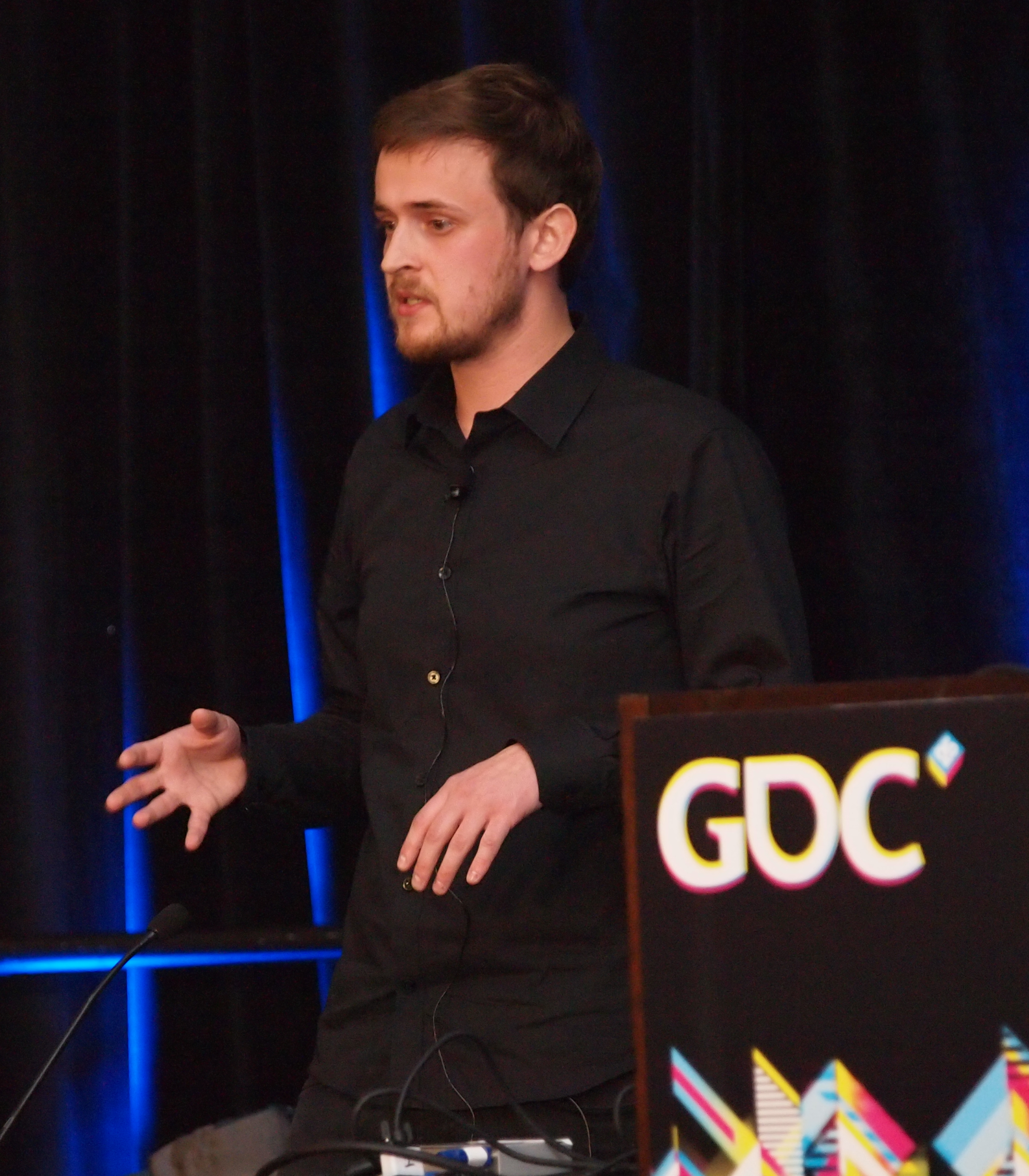
Jeppe Carlsen, the lead designer for Limbo's puzzles, speaking at the 2011 Game Developers Conference

The gameplay was the second element created for the game, following the graphics created by Jensen. The gameplay was created and refined using rudimentary graphic elements to establish the types of puzzles they wanted to have, but aware of how these elements would be presented to the player in the released version. Limbo was designed to avoid the pitfalls of major titles, where the same gameplay mechanic is used repeatedly. Carlsen, initially brought aboard as a programmer for the custom game engine, became the lead designer after Playdead found him to be capable at creating puzzles. Carlsen stated that the puzzles within Limbo were designed to "[keep] you guessing all the way through". Jensen also wanted to make the puzzles feel like a natural part of the environment, and to avoid the feeling that the player was simply moving from puzzle to puzzle through the course of the game. Carlsen identified examples of puzzles from other games that he wanted to avoid. He wanted to avoid simple puzzles that gave the player little satisfaction in its solution, such as a puzzle in Uncharted 2: Among Thieves that involved simply moving a sun-lit mirror to specific points in a room. In contrast, Carlsen wanted to avoid making the puzzle so complex with many separate parts that the player would resort to trial-and-error and eventually come out with the solution without thinking about why the solution worked; Carlsen used an example of a puzzle from the 2008 Prince of Persia game that had seven different mechanics that he never bothered to figure out himself. Carlsen designed Limbo's puzzles to fall between these limits, demonstrating one puzzle that only has three elements: a switch panel, an electrified floor, and a chain; the goal—to use the chain to cross the electrified floor—is immediately obvious to the player, and then tasks the player to determine the right combination of moves and timing to complete it safely. They often had to strip away elements to make the puzzles more enjoyable and easier to figure out. The decision to provide little information to the player was an initial challenge in creating the game. From their initial pool of about 150 playtesters, several would have no idea of how to solve certain puzzles. To improve this, they created scenarios before troublesome spots that highlighted the appropriate actions; for example, when they found players did not think about pulling a boat onto shore to use as a platform to reach a higher ledge, they presented the player with a box-pulling puzzle earlier to demonstrate the pulling mechanics.

The team developed the game's puzzles by first assuming the player was "their own worst enemy", and made puzzles as devious as possible, but then scaled back their difficulty or added visual and audible aids as if the player was a friend. One example given by Carlsen is a puzzle involving a spider early in the game; the solution requires pushing a bear trap to snare the spider's legs in it. Early designs of this puzzle had the bear trap on the same screen as the spider, and Playdead found that playtesters focused too much on the trap. The developers altered the puzzle to put the trap in a tree in an earlier off-screen section when facing the spider; the spider's actions would eventually cause this trap to drop to the ground and become a weapon against the spider. Carlsen stated that this arrangement created a situation where the player felt helpless when initially presented with the deadly spider, but then assisted the player through an audible cue when the trap had dropped, enabling the player to discover the solution.

One animator was dedicated full-time during three years of the game's development to work out the boy's animations, including animations that showed anticipation on the player's actions or events in the game, such as reaching out for a cart handle as the player moved the boy near it. Jensen felt this was important as the character was always at the center of the player's screen, and the most important element to watch. Playdead included gruesome death sequences to highlight incorrect solutions and discourage players from repeating their mistakes. While they expected players to run the boy into numerous deaths while trying solutions, Carlsen stated that their goal was to ensure death wasn't a penalty in the game, and made the death animations entertaining to keep the player interested. Carlsen noted several early puzzles were too complex for the game, but they would end up using a portion of these larger puzzles in the final release.

== Release history ==
Limbo was released on 21 July 2010 by Microsoft Game Studios, on the Xbox Live Arcade service, as the first title in the yearly "Summer of Arcade" promotion. Although the Entertainment Software Rating Board (ESRB) had listed entries for Limbo for the PlayStation 3 and Microsoft Windows platforms, Playdead confirmed that this was a mistake on ESRB's part, and that they had no plans for the game on these systems. Patti later clarified that they had planned on Windows and PlayStation 3 versions alongside the Xbox 360 version initially, but after reviewing their options, decided to go with Xbox 360 exclusivity, in part that "Microsoft provided us with an excellent opportunity, which included a lot of support for the title which in the end would mean a better visibility for Limbo". According to producer Mads Wibroe, part of their decision not to release for the Windows platform was to avoid issues with software piracy, something they could control on the Xbox 360. Patti stated that staying exclusive with the Xbox platform was an assurance that they would be able to recoup their investment in the game's development. Sony Computer Entertainment executive Pete Smith stated later that while they had tried to vie with Microsoft for exclusivity for Limbo, Playdead refused to relinquish its intellectual property to Sony as part of the deal. Patti affirmed that Limbo would not be released for another console, but that their next game, already in development as of October 2010, may see wider release.

However, in June 2011, users found that a trailer for Limbo appeared on the Steam software service, which video game publications such as PC Gamer took as a preliminary sign that a Microsoft Windows version would be released. Similarly, a possible PlayStation 3 version was projected based on the title appearing on the Korea Media Rating Board in June 2011. On 30 June 2011, Playdead announced their ports of the game to the PlayStation 3 via the PlayStation Network, and to Microsoft Windows via Steam, later set for 19 July and 2 August 2011, respectively. Patti clarified that their change of mind from their earlier Xbox 360-exclusive approach was because "we want as many people to play our games as possible". The release was set for nearly a year after the original availability of the Xbox 360 version, after the expiration of the Xbox 360 exclusivity rights for the game. Both the PlayStation 3 and Windows versions of the game have additional secret content, according to Patti; it is unknown if this content will be added in a patch to the Xbox 360 version. Playdead has since published a Mac OS X version of the game through the Mac App Store in December 2011, fulfilling their promise to release the title before the end of 2011; though they had wanted to also release the Mac Steam version by then, this version was ultimately delayed to mid January 2012. A Linux version of the game, based on a Wine-encapsulated package prepared by CodeWeavers, premiered in the Humble Indie Bundle V charitable sales event in May 2012. A native port for Linux was later released on 19 June 2014, with porter Ryan C. Gordon bringing over the Wwise audio middleware that previously prevented a native port from being possible. The PlayStation Vita version of the game was developed by Playdead with assistance from the UK studio Double Eleven, and was released in June 2013. The Vita version does not use the handheld's touchpad features; Patti stated that they "didn't feel it would suit Limbo at all" and wanted to provide the "original experience" of the game to Vita players. The Vita version has Cross-play support with the PlayStation 3 version, allowing the user to buy the game once to play on either platform. The iOS version of the game was announced shortly before its release in July 2013, and was designed to optimize the game for use on the touchscreen devices.

In April 2011, an Xbox 360 retail distribution of Limbo alongside other indie games Trials HD and 'Splosion Man was released. Playdead began selling a "Special Edition" physical copy of Limbo for Microsoft Windows and Mac OS X, which included art cards, the game's soundtrack, and anaglyph stereoscopic glasses that work with a special version of the game to simulate three dimensions. The title was later ported to the Xbox One console and released in December 2014, with early adopters of the console getting the title for free; Microsoft's Phil Spencer called the title a "must have played" game that affected their decision to give the game to the majority of early adopters. The Xbox 360 version was added to the Xbox One backwards compatibility lists in November 2016. A PlayStation 4 version of the game was released in February 2015.

In September 2017, 505 Games published Limbo along with Playdead's following title, Inside, as dual-game retail package for Xbox One and PlayStation 4. A version of Limbo was released on the Nintendo Switch on 28 June 2018.

== Reception ==
Reception

Aggregate score
| Aggregator | Score |
|---|---|
| Metacritic | X360: 90/100; PS3: 90/100; PC: 88/100; VITA: 89/100 iOS: 89/100; XONE: 85/100; NS: 83/100 |

Review scores
| Publication | Score |
|---|---|
| 1Up.com | B |
| Edge | 9/10 |
| Eurogamer | 9/10 |
| G4 | 5/5 |
| Game Informer | 9/10 |
| GameSpot | 9/10 |
| GameSpy | 5/5 |
| IGN | 9/10 |
| PALGN | 9.5/10 |
| TouchArcade | 3/5 |

Limbo's initial release on the Xbox 360 has received acclaim from video game critics and journalists; the subsequent release of the game for the PlayStation 3 and Microsoft Windows platforms received similar praise, holding Metacritic aggregate scores of 90/100 and 88/100, respectively, compared to the 90/100 earned by the Xbox 360 version. Some journalists compared Limbo to previous minimalist platform games such as Another World, Flashback, Heart of Darkness, Oddworld: Abe's Oddysee, Ico, Portal and Braid. Reviews consistently noted Limbo's short length for its higher selling price: two to five hours of gameplay for 15 euros or 15 U.S. dollars. Reviewers asserted this length-to-price ratio was the largest drawback for the game, and would be a deterrent for potential buyers. Some journalists contended that the length of the game was ideal; The Daily Telegraph's Tom Hoggins considered the short game to have a "perfectly formed running time", while Daemon Hatfield of IGN commented that "it's better for a game to leave us wanting more than to overstay its welcome". Numerous independent game developers, in an organised "Size Doesn't Matter" effort, commented on the critical response to Limbo's length-to-price ratio. The independent developers questioned the need to quantify that ratio, and noted that it only seems to be used as a factor in judging video games and not other forms of entertainment such as films.

Limbo was generally praised for its puzzle design and the simplicity of its controls. Jake Gaskill of G4 TV was impressed by the complexity of the puzzles based on the two simple actions of jumping and grabbing onto objects, similar to LittleBigPlanet, with a variety of elements to assure "you're always facing something new and challenging" during the game. Game Informer's Matt Miller commented that part of the success of Limbo is that "every one of these [puzzles] stands alone"; the game accomplishes this in Miller's opinion by varying the elements throughout the game, and preventing the player from getting too accustomed to similar solutions since "everything changes". GameSpy's Ryan Scott believed that the game empowered the player to work through solutions themselves, and its puzzle design, "with its elegant simplicity, offers up what feels like a world of meaningful possibilities". The frequency of death was not considered a distraction from the game; not only were the deaths seen as necessary as part of learning and overcoming each obstacle, but reviewers found the checkpoints where the player would restart to be plentiful throughout the game. Will Freeman of The Guardian praised the game but noted that beyond the "smoke and mirrors" of Limbo's artwork, the game is "undermined by the title's lack of innovative gameplay", which he says has been seen in earlier platform games.

=== Presentation ===
Limbo's graphical and audio presentation were considered by reviewers as exceptional and powerful elements of the game. The monochrome approach, coupled with film grain filter, focusing techniques and lighting, were compared to both film noir and dreamlike tableaus of silent films, allowing the visual elements of the game to carry much of the story's weight. Cian Hassett of PALGN likened the effect to watching the game through an old-fashioned film projector that creates "one of the most unsettling and eerily beautiful environments" in video gaming. Garrett Martin of the Boston Herald compared the art style and game design decisions to German Expressionism with "dreamlike levels that twist and spin in unexpected angles". The art style itself was praised as minimalistic, and considered reminiscent of the art of Lotte Reiniger, Edward Gorey, Fritz Lang, and Tim Burton. The use of misdirection in the visuals was also praised, such as by using silhouettes to avoid revealing the true nature of the characters or shadows, or by showing human figures across a chasm who disappear once the player crossed the chasm.

Reviewers found the sound effects within the game critical to the game's impact. Sam Machkovech, writing for The Atlantic, called the sound direction, "far more colorful and organic than the fuzzed-out looks would lead you to believe". Edge magazine's review noted that the few background noises "[do] little else than contribute towards Limbo’s tone", while the sound effects generated by moving the boy character "are given an eerie clarity without the presence of a conventional soundtrack to cover them".

IGN's Hatfield concluded his review by stating, "Very few games are as original, atmospheric, and consistently brilliant as Limbo". Chad Sapeiha of The Globe and Mail summarised his opinion of the game's atmosphere as an "intensely scary, oddly beautiful, and immediately arresting aesthetic." Limbo is said to be the first game to attempt a mix of the horror fiction genre with platform games. The game has been considered an art game through its visual and audio elements.

=== Plot ===
The game's story and its ending have been open to much interpretation; the ending was purposely left vague and unanswered by Playdead. It was compared to other open-ended books, films and video games, where the viewer is left to interpret what they have read or seen. Some reviews suggested that the game is a representation of the religious nature of Limbo or purgatory, as the boy character completes the journey only to end at the same place he started, repeating the same journey when the player starts a new game. Another interpretation suggested the game is the boy's journey through Hell to reach Heaven, or to find closure for his sister's death. Another theory considers that either the boy or his sister or both are dead. Some theories attempted to incorporate details from the game, such as the change in setting as the boy travels through the game suggesting the progression of man from child to adult to elder, or the similarities and differences between the final screen of the game where the boy meets a girl and the main menu where what could be human remains stand in their places.

The absence of direct narrative, such as through cutscenes or in-game text, was a mixed point for reviewers. John Teti of Eurogamer considered the game's base story to be metaphorical for a "story of a search for companionship", and that the few encounters with human characters served as "emotional touchstones" that drove the story forward; ultimately, Teti stated that these elements make Limbo "a game that has very few humans, but a surplus of humanity". Hatfield praised the simplicity of the game's story, commenting that, "with no text, no dialogue, and no explanation, it manages to communicate circumstance and causality to the player more simply than most games". Both Teti and Hatfield noted that some of the story elements were weaker in the second half of the game, when there are almost no human characters with whom the player comes into contact, but that the game ends with an unexpected revelation. GameSpot's Tom McShae found no issues with the game posing questions on "death versus life and reality versus dream", but purposely providing no answers for them, allowing the player to contemplate these on their own. McShae also considered that the brief but gruesome death scenes for the boy helped to create an "emotional immediacy that is difficult to forget". The New York Daily News' Stu Horvath noted that Limbo "turns its lack of obvious narrative into one of the most compelling riddles in videogames".

Other reviews disliked the lack of story or its presentation within Limbo. Justin Haywald of 1UP.com was critical of the lacking narrative, feeling that the game failed to explain the purpose of the constructed traps or rationale for how the game's world worked, and that the final act left him "more confused than when [he] began". Haywald had contrasted Limbo to Braid, a similar platform game with minimalistic elements which communicates its metaphorical story to the player through in-game text. Roger Hargreaves of Metro stated that the game has "very little evidence that [Playdead] really knew where they were going with the game", citing the second half, when the player is traveling through a factory-type setting and where he felt the game became more like a typical two-dimensional platform game, and led to an anticlimactic ending; Hargreaves contrasted this to more gruesome elements of the first half, such as encountering corpses of children and having to use those as part of the puzzle-solving aspects.

=== Sales and accolades ===
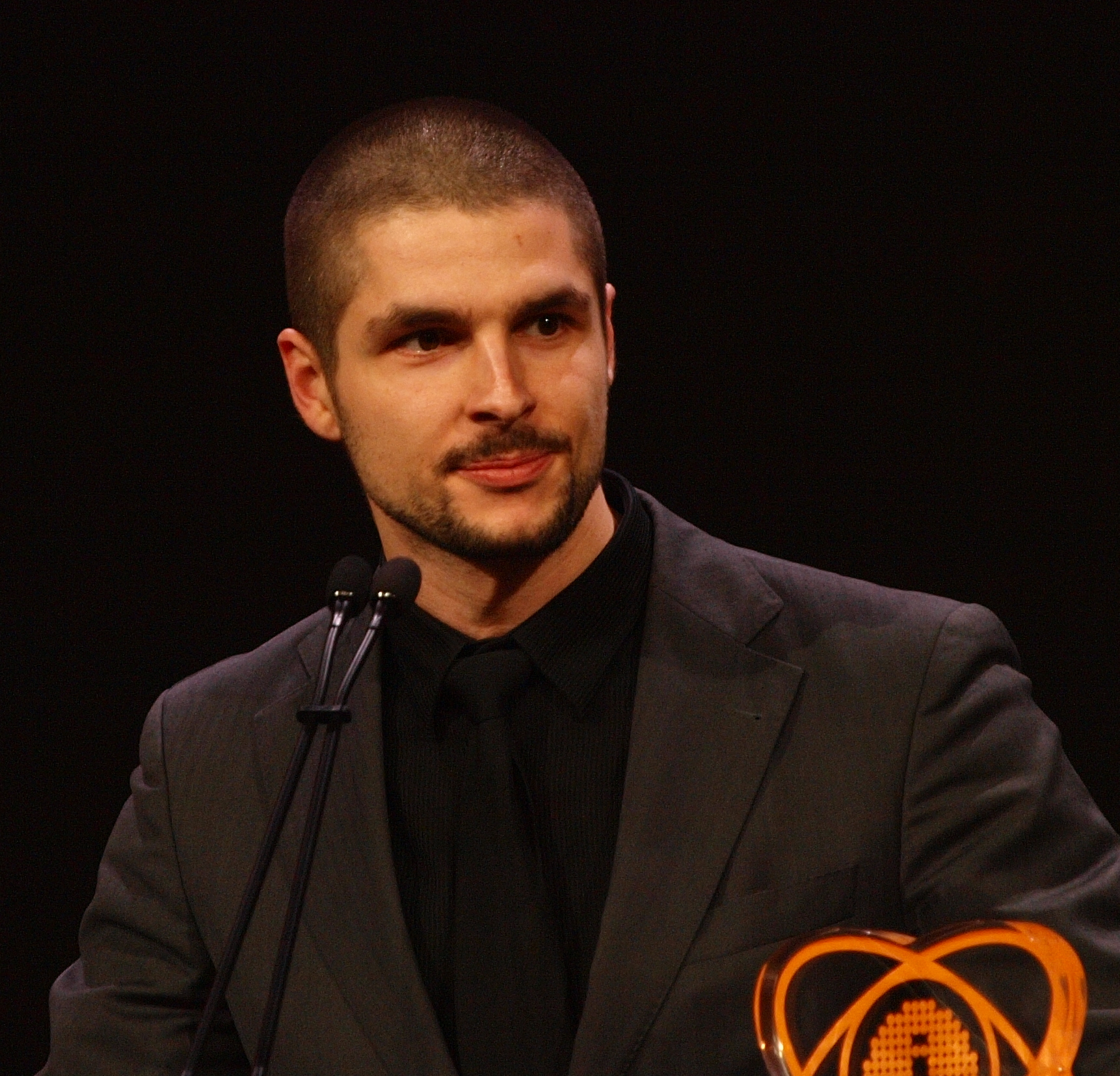
Playdead co-founder and Limbo developer Dino Patti, accepting one of the Independent Games Festival Awards at the 2010 Game Developers Conference

Before its release, Limbo was awarded both the "Technical Excellence" and "Excellence in Visual Art" titles at the Independent Games Festival during the 2010 Game Developers Conference. At E3 2010—about a month before its release—Limbo won GameSpot's "Best Downloadable Game", and was nominated for several other "Best of Show" awards, including "Best Platformer" by IGN, "Most Original Game" by G4 TV, and "Best Puzzle Game" by GameSpot. The game was nominated as one of 32 finalists at the 2010 IndieCade festival for independent developers, ultimately winning the "Sound" award.

Following its release, Limbo was named "Game of the Year", "Best Indie Game", and "Best Visual Art" at the 2010 European Milthon Awards during the Paris Game Show in September 2010. Game Informer named Limbo their Game of the Month for August 2010. Limbo was awarded the "Best Indie Game" at the 2010 Spike Video Game Awards. The game received the most nominations for the 11th Annual Game Developers Choice Awards, earning seven nominations including for the "Best Debut Game", "Innovation", and "Game of the Year" awards, and ultimately won for "Best Visual Art". During the 14th Annual Interactive Achievement Awards, Limbo was awarded with "Adventure Game of the Year" and "Outstanding Achievement in Sound Design" by the Academy of Interactive Arts & Sciences; it also received nominations for "Outstanding Achievement in Game Direction" and "Outstanding Innovation in Gaming". The academy also named Limbo as the winner of the 2010 Indie Game Challenge award in the "Professional" category, along with a $100,000 prize. The game was selected as the 2010 Annie Award for Best Animated Video Game. Limbo was named as one of ten games for the publicly voted 2011 "Game of the Year" BAFTA Video Game Awards. In addition, the game was nominated for the committee-determined BAFTA awards for "Artistic Achievement", "Use of Audio", "Gameplay" and "Best Game". The inclusion of the independently developed Limbo among other larger commercially backed games such as Assassin's Creed: Brotherhood and Call of Duty: Black Ops for such "Best Game" awards is considered an indication that the video game industry has started to give more recognition to these smaller titles.

Several publications, including Time, Wired and the Toronto Sun placed Limbo as one of the top ten video games of 2010. IGN named it the third best Xbox Live Arcade title of all time in two lists, published in 2010 and 2011, in both cases following Shadow Complex and Pac Man Championship Edition. The site also included the scene where the boy reaches a neon hotel sign as one of 100 Unforgettable Video Game Moments. Limbo was spoofed by the comedy troupe Mega64 during the 2011 Game Developers Conference, and later by the CollegeHumor sister website, Dorkly.

Within two weeks of its release on Xbox Live Arcade, Limbo gained more than 244,000 players to the global leaderboards—a rough measure of full sales of the game—which was considered an "incredibly impressive feat" compared to previous Xbox Live Arcade titles, according to GamerBytes' Ryan Langley. Within a month of its release, more than 300,000 copies of the game were sold. By the end of August 2010, the number of players on the global leaderboard grew to 371,000, exceeding the number of players of other Summer of Arcade games released in 2009, and approaching the number of lifetime players of Braid, released two years earlier. Langley, who had expected Limbo's sales to fall "due to the lack of repeatable content and being a strictly single player experience", considered that these figures had "beaten everyone’s expectations". Phil Spencer, the vice-president of Microsoft Game Studios, stated in September 2010 that Limbo was "our number one Summer of Arcade game by a long stretch", and further posed that Limbo represents a shift in the type of game that gamers want out of online on-demand game services; "it's becoming less about iconic [intellectual property] that people know and it's becoming more diverse". Limbo was the third-highest selling Xbox Live Arcade title in 2010, selling 527,000 and generating about $7.5 million in revenue. In March 2011, Microsoft listed Limbo as the 11th-highest selling game to date on Xbox Live. Playdead stated that more than two million users on the Xbox 360 service played through the demo within the year of the game's release.

The developers announced that as of November 2011, they had sold over 1 million copies of the game across the Xbox 360, PlayStation 3, and Microsoft Windows platforms. By June 2013, just prior to the iOS release, Playdead announced that total sales of Limbo across all platforms exceeded 3 million. The PlayStation 3 version was the top selling third-party downloadable game on the PlayStation Network service in 2011. The PlayStation 3 version was also voted "Best Indie Game" in the 2012 PSN Gamers' Choice Awards. The Mac OS X version of Limbo was awarded with Apple's Design Award in 2012.

Applications for grants from the Nordic Game Program, which had funded Limbo's initial development, increased 50% in the second half of 2010, believed to be tied to the game's success. Playdead was able to buy itself back from its investors in August 2011 from the revenue made from sales of Limbo. Playdead's follow-up title, Inside, first released in June 2016, is visually and thematically similar to Limbo, and includes some elements that were cut from Limbo's development.
