= Amanda Richards =

American singer-songwriter (born 1983)

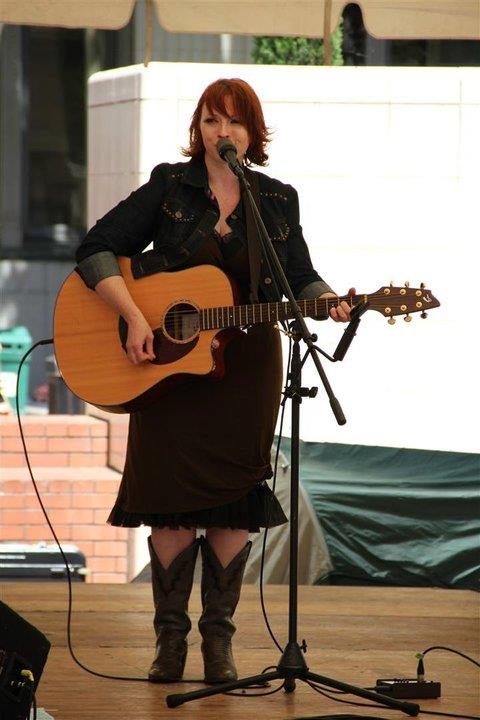

Background information
- Born: April 25, 1983 (age 42); Orange, California, U.S.
- Genres: Gothic americana, folk, country, rock
- Occupation(s): Filmmaker, producer, singer-songwriter
- Instrument(s): Guitar, vocals, piano
- Years active: 2000–present
- Website: http://www.amandarichards.net = http://www.whiskeydixiemusical.com

Amanda Richards (born April 25, 1983) is an American filmmaker, producer, director, writer, actress, and singer-songwriter from Portland, Oregon. Richards is best known as the creator of the film and theatrical production of Whiskey Dixie & The Big Wet Country, a raunchy outlaw-country musical.

== Biography ==
Amanda is the granddaughter of Rusty Richards, who was a 21-year member of the Western singing group The Sons of the Pioneers, and she began writing songs herself when only 12 years old. By 2002, she had produced and recorded an EP entitled Last Train, which is no longer in print. This EP featured several of her early songs as well as a cover version of Van Morrison's "Wild Night". In 2004, while still attending Mount Hood Community College in Gresham, Oregon, Richards released her debut album, Not Always Sexy, to considerable regional acclaim. She followed this up with a live album entitled Live at Mississippi Studios in 2006, and her second studio LP, Who Has Your Heart followed in 2009. During these years, Richards also became involved in the Portland burlesque scene, frequently performing under the stage name, "Demanda". In a 2011 interview, she described these burlesque appearances as helping her to "infuse more theatrics" into her live performances.

Her 2011 album, Play Dead, a concept album in which Richards stars as the only survivor of the zombie apocalypse, won an Independent Music Award for "Best Concept Album" in 2012.

== Discography ==
- Last Train EP (2002)
- Not Always Sexy (2004)
- Live at Mississippi Studios (2006)
- Who Has Your Heart (2009)
- Play Dead (2011)
- Bleak Winter (2014)
- Tough Ones to Love (2016)
- Whiskey Dixie & The Big Wet Country (Limited Release Soundtrack) (2018)
