= Inside (video game) =

2016 video game

- Developer: Playdead
- Publisher: Playdead
- Director: Arnt Jensen
- Producer: Mads Wibroe
- Designer: Jeppe Carlsen
- Programmer: Kristian Kjems
- Composers: Martin Stig Andersen; Søs Gunver Ryberg
- Engine: Unity
- Platforms: Xbox One; Windows; PlayStation 4; iOS; Apple TV; Nintendo Switch; macOS
- Release: June 29, 2016: Xbox One; June 29, 2016; Windows; July 7, 2016; PlayStation 4; August 23, 2016; iOS, Apple TV; December 15, 2017; Nintendo Switch; June 28, 2018; macOS; June 23, 2020
- Genres: Puzzle-platform; Horror
- Mode: Single-player

Inside (stylized in all caps) is a 2016 puzzle-platform horror game developed and published by Playdead. The game was released for the Xbox One in June 2016, Windows in July, and PlayStation 4 in August, followed by releases for iOS in December 2017, Nintendo Switch in June 2018, and macOS in June 2020. The player controls a boy in a dystopian world, solving environmental puzzles and avoiding death. It is Playdead's second game following Limbo (2010), sharing similar 2.5D gameplay.

Playdead began work on Inside shortly after the release of Limbo, using Limbo's custom game engine. The team switched to Unity to simplify development, adding their own rendering routines, later released as open source, to create a signature look. The game was partially funded by a grant from the Danish Film Institute. Inside premiered at Microsoft's E3 2014 conference, with a planned release in 2015, but was delayed to 2016.

Inside was released to critical acclaim. Critics noted it as an improvement over Limbo, praising its art direction, atmosphere and gameplay. The game was nominated for numerous accolades, including game of the year, and won several independent awards for technical achievement. As with Limbo, Inside is included on multiple lists of the greatest video games of all time as compiled by game journalists.

== Gameplay ==
Inside is a puzzle platformer. The player character is an unnamed boy or young man who explores a surreal and mostly monochromatic environment presented as a 2.5D platform game. The game is dark, with color used sparingly to highlight both the player and certain parts of the environment. The game is mostly silent, with the exception of occasional musical cues, the boy's vocals, dogs barking, equipment and sound effects. The character can walk, run, swim, climb, and use objects to overcome obstacles and progress in the game. At select areas of the game, the character can use a device (similar in appearance to the later-mentioned glowing orbs) to control bodies in order to complete certain puzzles, a mechanic that IGN's Marty Sliva compared to a similar one in The Swapper. At various points in the game, the player may discover hidden rooms containing glowing orbs. If all the orbs are deactivated during a playthrough, the player unlocks the game's alternate ending.

The player can die in a multitude of ways, including drowning, being shot with a gun or tranquilizer dart, mauled by dogs, ensnared by security machines, being blown apart by shockwaves, and others. As in the predecessor game Limbo, these deaths are presented realistically and are often graphic, but to a larger degree, earning the ESRB's Mature rating as opposed to Limbo's Teen rating. If the character dies, the game continues from the most recent checkpoint.

Later in the game, the player controls a monster called the Huddle, who possesses great strength and cannot die when controlled by the player. However, the player will still need to rely on strategy to get through certain areas.

== Plot ==
A boy or young man slides down a rocky incline. While running through a forest, he encounters masked guards with flashlights, as well as vehicles with mounted spotlights, and fierce guard dogs. He escapes the guards, then crosses a road where a block has been set up with more vehicles and guards, to a farm where parasitic worms cause pigs to run rampant. The boy uses the farm animals and equipment to escape to a seemingly abandoned city where lines of zombie-like people are moved through mind control. Beyond the city is a vast underground facility of flooded rooms, a shock wave atrium, and a laboratory environment where scientists perform underwater experiments on bodies.

While traversing these areas, the boy uses a mind-control helmet to control some of the zombies he encounters. The boy comes across an underwater siren-like creature that attaches a device to him, allowing him to breathe underwater.

Continuing through the office and laboratories, the boy sees scientists observing a large spherical chamber. The boy enters the chamber and discovers the Huddle, a monstrous mass of conjoined human bodies. After disconnecting the Huddle's restraints, the boy is pulled into it, seemingly becoming one with the Huddle.

The Huddle escapes confinement, crashing through offices, killing some of the scientists in its path. The scientists trap the Huddle in another tank, but the Huddle escapes again and breaks through a wooden wall. It rolls down a forest hill and comes to a stop at a grassy coastline bathed in light.

=== Alternate ending ===
If the player deactivates several light orbs hidden throughout the game, the boy can return to an early bunker and access a new underground area. The area contains a bank of computers and one of the mind-control helmets, powered by a nearby socket. The boy pulls the plug from the socket, and assumes the same stance as the deactivated zombies.

=== Theories ===
Journalists and players have offered several different theories about the game's main ending (the freeing of the Huddle) and the alternative ending.

One theory speculates that the boy is controlled by the Huddle throughout most of the game, leading him to help free the Huddle from containment. As described by Jeffrey Matulef of Eurogamer, the game impresses that the Huddle has a magnetic-like draw that leads the boy to endanger himself and unquestioningly enter the tank where the Huddle is kept so as to free it. Players speculated on the theory that taking the alternate ending is working contrary to the Huddle's goal, and the act of unplugging the computers is to release the Huddle's control on the boy. When the Huddle escapes, there is a 3D diorama that represents the coasts at which the Huddle arrives after escaping the tank of water. A similar theory has the boy being controlled by one or more of the scientists, evidenced by how some of the scientists appear to aid the Huddle in escaping the facility. In this theory, the scientists put the boy through many dangers to gain strength and intelligence, so that these qualities can be absorbed by the Huddle when the boy frees it, improving the creature in a desirable manner for these scientists.

A more metafictional interpretation of the game from its alternate ending is based on the notion of player agency. Matulef summarizes this theory as "the boy is being controlled by a renegade force represented by the player". The act of pulling the plug in the final area is similar to the concept of The Matrix, as described by PC Gamer's Tim Clark. Matulef explains that the location of the alternate ending is only known to the player with knowledge of the main ending and not to the Huddle or the scientists. With knowledge of the game's true ending, achieving the alternate ending is to reach a conclusion to the game that "ostensibly puts an end to the boy, the blob, and any inhumane experiments being conducted".

== Development ==
Playdead released the monochromatic Limbo in July 2010, which was critically praised and sold over one million units. Within a few months of its release, Playdead began development on their second game under the working title "Project 2". As a spiritual successor to Limbo, Inside reclaimed assets from Limbo's development. Playdead said that the two games were similar, though Inside is more "crazy", "weird", and 3D. The Danish Film Institute provided one million dollars in funding towards the game.

While Playdead had built a custom game engine for Limbo, they chose Unity to reduce their workload. The developers created a temporal anti-aliasing filter for the engine, entitled "temporal reprojection", to create a signature look for Inside. In March 2016, Playdead released the source code under an open source license.

2010 concept art of the Huddle by Morten Bramsen. The art helped animate the Huddle and drive Inside's art direction.

The Huddle, the amalgam of body parts that the player controls at the end of the game, had been an idea for the game since 2010, when animator Andreas Normand Grøntved had been brought aboard Playdead to do preliminary animations for it based on a drawing by artist Morten Bramsen. Bramsen's drawing of the Huddle served to guide much of the visual nature and art style for the rest of the game. To animate it, Grøntved took inspiration from the motion of Nago the demon form of the boar god from Princess Mononoke, the squishiness of the main character of the game Gish, and human behavior during crowd surfing. Grøntved developed initial animations using what he called the Huddle Potato that simplified the geometries to demonstrate how the being would move and interact with the environment. Whereas most of the other game animations were based on a combination of pre-set skeletal movements along with the physics engine, the Huddle had to be animated predominantly by a custom physics model developed by Thomas Krog, and implemented by Lasse Jon Fulgsang Pedersen, Søren Trautner Madsen, and Mikkel Bøgeskov Svendsen. This model uses a 26-body simulation of the core of the Huddle, driven by a network of impulses based on the direction of the player and the local environment, which allowed the Huddle to reconfigure itself as it needed in certain situations, such as fitting into tight spaces. They then added six arms and six legs with some pre-set animations that would also help to drive the impulse in the main body simulation. The skin of the huddle was a mix of art styles borrowed from the sculptures of John Isaacs, and the art of Jenny Saville and Rembrandt. The vocals and bodysounds were performed by the renowned Danish-Austrian performance group SIGNA.

=== Music ===
Martin Stig Andersen, with SØS Gunver Ryberg, composed and designed Inside's soundtrack, returning from Limbo. Andersen was inspired by 1980s B horror films, often using synthesizers, but did not want to compose an actual soundtrack. Instead, he created the music by routing sound through a human skull and recording the result, a "bone-conducting sound" that created a "sombre, chill quality" that often complements Inside's visuals.

Inside has a close integration of the game-play and audio, with some puzzles set directly to visual-aural cues. This required Andersen to work more closely with the game-play developers than he had in Limbo. This enabled additional visual elements tied to the audio; Andersen noted that the boy's chest movements related to breathing are tied to the sound effects he created for his breathing, which themselves are influenced by where the character is in the game, with differences being calm and panicked emotions depending on location. Andersen collaborated with the design team on the game's general structure and pacing to provide scenes where the music builds up atmospheric tension.

== Marketing ==
Microsoft announced Inside during its E3 2014 press conference. Prior to this, the game had been planned for release on non-Microsoft platforms, including the PlayStation 3 and OS X. Playdead had purposely waited four years so as to give little time between the announce event and the launch. IGN's Ryan McCaffrey wrote that the announcement was a sign of Microsoft's commitment to indie game development and said it was his biggest surprise of the year. The developer later delayed the game from its expected early 2015 release for further refinement of the game, but provided no expected launch window. A playable demo was prepared for an August 2015 Microsoft event before PAX Prime. With the delay, Playdead only planned for initial release on Windows and Xbox One, but had expressed interest in other consoles in the future.

Playdead announced Inside's release dates during E3 2016, and as a limited-time promotion, let players download Limbo for free in advance of the title's release. Inside was released for Xbox One on 29 June 2016, and for Windows via Steam on 7 July. Ports for other platforms followed: the PlayStation 4 version was released on 23 August, the iOS version on December 15, 2017, and the Nintendo Switch version on June 28, 2018 alongside the release of Limbo. 505 Games published Inside and Limbo as a dual-game retail package for Xbox One and PlayStation 4, which was released in September 2017.

Playdead partnered with iam8bit and Abyss Creations (the manufacturers of RealDoll) to create a special release edition of the game for the PlayStation 4 which includes a silicone recreation of the Huddle, along with additional art. Though revealed and sold in 2018, the contents of the special edition were not fully revealed until December 2019.

== Reception ==
Reception

Aggregate score
Aggregator	Score
Metacritic	XONE: 93/100; PC: 87/100; PS4: 91/100; NS: 91/100

Review scores
Publication	Score
Destructoid	9.5/10
Edge	9/10
Electronic Gaming Monthly	9.5/10
Game Informer	9.75/10
GameRevolution	4.5/5
GameSpot	8/10
GamesRadar+	4.5/5
Giant Bomb	5/5
IGN	10/10
PC Gamer (US)	76/100
Polygon	9.5/10
TouchArcade	4/5
VideoGamer.com	10/10

Inside received universal acclaim, according to video game review aggregator website Metacritic. Critics favorably compared the title as a worthy successor to Limbo. The game was one of Polygon and IGN's most anticipated 2016 releases. From previewing the game at E3 2016, IGN's Marty Sliva considered the title to be "Super Limbo", polishing and improving from Playdead's first game into the new title in the same manner that Nintendo had done for its previous games in bringing them to the Super Nintendo Entertainment System. Kirk Hamilton of Kotaku called the game an "evolution" on what Playdead has succeeded to do with Limbo. Jaz Rignall of USgamer previewed Inside and wrote that it was one of the best puzzle platformers he has played, even better than its predecessor.

Much like for Limbo, several publications have included Inside on their lists of the greatest video games of all time. In 2022, PC Gamer listed Inside as one of the best PC games, with editor Rich Stanton stating the game was "one of the very best experiences I've had in gaming", and contributing writers stating the game was "the perfect narrative sidescroller", and "had one of the best endings of any game".

== Accolades ==
The game won the awards for "Golden Cube" and "Best Desktop/Console Game" at the Unity Awards 2016, and it also won the award for "Best-Looking Game" at the Giant Bomb 2016 Game of the Year Awards, whereas its other nomination was for "Best Moment or Sequence". At The Edge Awards 2016, the game came in second place each for "Best Visual Design", "Best Storytelling" and "Studio of the Year", and it came in third place for "Game of the Year", while it won the award for "Best Audio Design". It was also awarded an Apple Design Award in 2018.

Year	Award	Category	Result	Ref.
2016	Game Critics Awards 2016	Best Independent Game	Won	
2016	Golden Joystick Awards 2016	Best Original Game	Nominated	
2016	Golden Joystick Awards 2016	Best Visual Design	Nominated	
2016	Golden Joystick Awards 2016	Best Audio	Nominated	
2016	Golden Joystick Awards 2016	Best Indie Game	Nominated	
2016	Golden Joystick Awards 2016	Best Gaming Moment (The Ending)	Nominated	
2016	Golden Joystick Awards 2016	Game of the Year	Nominated	
2016	Golden Joystick Awards 2016	Xbox Game of the Year	Nominated	
2016	The Game Awards 2016	Game of the Year	Nominated	
2016	The Game Awards 2016	Best Narrative	Nominated	
2016	The Game Awards 2016	Best Art Direction	Won	
2016	The Game Awards 2016	Best Music/Sound Design	Nominated	
2016	The Game Awards 2016	Best Independent Game	Won	
2016	Canadian Videogame Awards 2016	Fans' Choice: Best International Game	Nominated	
2017	20th Annual D.I.C.E. Awards	Game of the Year	Nominated	
2017	20th Annual D.I.C.E. Awards	Adventure Game of the Year	Nominated	
2017	20th Annual D.I.C.E. Awards	D.I.C.E. Sprite Award	Won	
2017	20th Annual D.I.C.E. Awards	Outstanding Achievement in Game Direction	Won	
2017	20th Annual D.I.C.E. Awards	Outstanding Achievement in Game Design	Nominated	
2017	20th Annual D.I.C.E. Awards	Outstanding Achievement in Animation	Nominated	
2017	20th Annual D.I.C.E. Awards	Outstanding Achievement in Art Direction	Won	
2017	20th Annual D.I.C.E. Awards	Outstanding Achievement in Sound Design	Nominated	
2017	20th Annual D.I.C.E. Awards	Outstanding Achievement in Story	Nominated	
2017	National Academy of Video Game Trade Reviewers	Camera Direction in a Game Engine	Won	
2017	Independent Games Festival 2016	Seumas McNally Grand Prize	Nominated	
2017	Independent Games Festival 2016	Excellence in Audio	Nominated	
2017	Independent Games Festival 2016	Excellence in Visual Art	Nominated	
2017	17th Game Developers Choice Awards	Game of the Year	Nominated	
2017	17th Game Developers Choice Awards	Best Audio	Won	
2017	17th Game Developers Choice Awards	Best Design	Nominated	
2017	17th Game Developers Choice Awards	Best Narrative	Nominated	
2017	17th Game Developers Choice Awards	Best Visual Art	Won	
2017	17th Game Developers Choice Awards	Innovation Award	Nominated	
2017	2017 SXSW Gaming Awards	Excellence in Design	Nominated	
2017	2017 SXSW Gaming Awards	Excellence in Art	Nominated	
2017	2017 SXSW Gaming Awards	Excellence in Animation	Nominated	
2017	2017 SXSW Gaming Awards	Excellence in SFX	Nominated	
2017	13th British Academy Games Awards	Best Game	Nominated	
2017	13th British Academy Games Awards	Artistic Achievement	Won	
2017	13th British Academy Games Awards	Audio Achievement	Nominated	
2017	13th British Academy Games Awards	Game Design	Won	
2017	13th British Academy Games Awards	Music	Nominated	
2017	13th British Academy Games Awards	Narrative	Won	
2017	13th British Academy Games Awards	Original Property	Won	
2018	2018 Webby Awards	Action	Won	
2018	2018 Webby Awards	Best Game Design	Nominated	
2018	2018 Webby Awards	Best Music/Sound Design	Nominated	
2018	2018 Webby Awards	Best User Experience (People's Voice)	Won	
2018	2018 Webby Awards	Best Visual Design	Won	
2018	2018 Webby Awards	Best Writing	Nominated	
2018	2018 Webby Awards	Puzzle	Nominated	
