= Beautiful Desolation =

- Developer(s): The Brotherhood
- Publisher(s): The Brotherhood (PC); Untold Tales (NS, PS4)
- Composer(s): Mick Gordon
- Engine: Unity
- Platform(s): Windows; Linux; macOS; Nintendo Switch; PlayStation 4
- Release: WW: February 26, 2020 (Win); WW: March 20, 2020 (Linux); WW: April 20, 2020 (macOS); WW: May 28, 2021 (NS, PS4)
- Genre(s): Adventure game
- Mode(s): Single-player

Beautiful Desolation is a point-and-click adventure game by The Brotherhood. It uses an isometric perspective and is set in a post-apocalyptic version of South Africa. When alien technology teleports two brothers into the future, they must find a way back home.

== Gameplay ==
After an alien ship lands on Earth in 1980, the technological and social upheaval radically transforms human civilization. Ten years later, brothers Mark and Don Leslie investigate the ship after having their lives ruined. They are sent into the distant future by its security systems and must figure out a way back. Beautiful Desolation is a point-and-click adventure game played from an isometric perspective. Players control Mark as he attempts to solve the various issues facing the new civilizations, such as retrieving lost objects or mediating a dispute. In return, they collect technology that they hope will return them to their present. Choices made when solving puzzles or during dialogue do not lock out players from the ending, though they can affect what ending players see. Combat is very rare; players can optionally participate in arena battles to advance one story line.

== Development ==
Brothers and game designers Chris and Nic Bischoff founded The Brotherhood. The soundtrack was composed by Mick Gordon. Beautiful Desolation was crowd-funded on Kickstarter in February 2017 and raised a bit more than its goal.

The idea of the game came from an earlier short story the brothers had written. Chris said their influences include "A Boy and His Dog, Soylent Green, Logan's Run, and a healthy dose of Mad Max". Fallout and Baldur's Gate influenced the look and feel of the game, including the isometric point of view and the detailed-oriented backgrounds. They wanted to work within their story but give players more agency than their previous game, Stasis. They also wanted to move away from 2D characters, which they felt slowed down their development. With this change, they switched to developing in Unity.

The South African setting was chosen because of the developers' familiarity and because they felt outsiders would see Africa as more interesting. They also wanted to explore the history of South Africa, including making an AI that was modeled after the apartheid era. To appeal to Westerners, The Brotherhood considered limiting the amount of South African cultural references and hiring voice actors with a more international accent. They abandoned this after finding it too creatively limiting. Don's voice actor is a veteran of the South African Border War, which informed some of the emotional weight in the game's story.

The Brotherhood released Beautiful Desolation for Windows, macOS, and Linux on February 26, 2020. Untold Tales published the console ports. For these ports, The Brotherhood reworked the game's user interface. It was released for PlayStation 4 and Nintendo Switch on May 28, 2021.

== Reception ==
On Metacritic, the PC version received positive reviews; the Switch and PlayStation 4 versions received mixed reviews. Adventure Gamers said it "succeeds admirably on most fronts". They said that progressing through the story can be "both engaging and frustrating" because of the quest and puzzle design, which occasionally require pixel hunting and backtracking. However, they felt the game "really showcases the creativity and impressive production values that The Brotherhood is capable of". Nintendo Life and NintendoWorldReport criticized the Switch port, which they said had frequent and long load times and poor controls. Though calling it an "ambitious and lovely-looking game", Nintendo Life criticized the puzzles and story, which they felt involved too many fetch quests and an emphasis on quirky dialogue.
