= 14th Annual Interactive Achievement Awards =

Video game award ceremony

- Date: February 11, 2011
- Venue: Red Rock Casino, Resort & Spa
- Country: Las Vegas, Nevada, USA
- Hosted by: Jay Mohr

Highlights
- Most awards: Red Dead Redemption (5)
- Most nominations: Red Dead Redemption (9)
- Game of the Year: Mass Effect 2
- Hall of Fame: Ray Muzyka & Greg Zeschuk
- Lifetime Achievement: Bing Gordon
- Pioneer: Bill Budge

The 14th Annual Interactive Achievement Awards was the 14th edition of the Interactive Achievement Awards, an annual awards event that honored the best games in the video game industry during 2010. The awards were arranged by the Academy of Interactive Arts & Sciences (AIAS) and were held at the Red Rock Casino, Resort & Spa in Las Vegas, Nevada on February 11, 2011. It was also held as part of the Academy's 2011 D.I.C.E. Summit, and was hosted by stand-up comedian Jay Mohr.

The craft award for "Outstanding Achievement in Game Design" was not offered this year along with the award for "Portable Game Design". Only one award for "Outstanding Achievement in Story" would be offered instead of having separate awards for "Original Story" and "Adapted Story". While "Downloadable Game of the Year" was not listed on the rules & procedures, it was featured on the submission form; however, no finalists were named for the category.

Mass Effect 2 won "Game of the Year", while Red Dead Redemption received the most nominations and won the most awards. Sony Computer Entertainment had the most nominations and tied with Electronic Arts for having the most nominated games. The two companies also tied Rockstar San Diego for winning the most awards, with Electronic Arts and Sony having the most award-winning games. God of War had two award-winning titles during this ceremony, with God of War III winning "Outstanding Achievement in Animation", and God of War: Ghost of Sparta winning "Portable Game of the Year".

BioWare co-founders Ray Muzyka & Greg Zeschuk were inducted into the Academy of Interactive Arts & Sciences Hall of Fame. Bing Gordon, former Chief Creative Officer of Electronic Arts, received the "Lifetime Achievement Award". Bill Budge, a game designer for the Apple II, received the "Pioneer Award".

== Winners and Nominees ==
Winners are listed first, highlighted in boldface, and indicated with a double dagger (‡).

=== Game of the Year awards ===
**Game of the Year**: **Mass Effect 2** — **BioWare**, **Electronic Arts**‡; Angry Birds HD — Rovio Entertainment, Chillingo; Call of Duty: Black Ops — Treyarch, Activision; God of War III — SCE Santa Monica Studio, Sony Computer Entertainment; Red Dead Redemption — Rockstar San Diego, Rockstar Games
| **Portable Game of the Year**: **God of War: Ghost of Sparta** — **Ready at Dawn**, **Sony Computer Entertainment**‡; Dragon Quest IX: Sentinels of the Starry Skies — Square Enix, Nintendo; Infinity Blade — Chair Entertainment, Epic Games; Professor Layton and the Unwound Future — Level-5, Nintendo; Valkyria Chronicles II — Sega | **Outstanding Innovation in Gaming**: **Heavy Rain** — **Quantic Dream**, **Sony Computer Entertainment**‡; Angry Birds HD — Rovio Entertainment, Chillingo; Dance Central — Harmonix, MTV Games; Limbo — Playdead; Red Dead Redemption — Rockstar San Diego |

=== Craft awards ===
**Outstanding Achievement in Game Direction**: **Red Dead Redemption** — **Rockstar San Diego**‡; Assassin's Creed: Brotherhood — Ubisoft Montreal; Enslaved: Odyssey to the West — Ninja Theory, Namco Bandai Games; Limbo — Playdead; Mass Effect 2 — BioWare, Electronic Arts
| **Outstanding Achievement in Animation**: **God of War III** — **SCE Santa Monica Studio**‡; Call of Duty: Black Ops — Treyarch, Activision; Enslaved: Odyssey to the West — Ninja Theory, Namco Bandai Games; Red Dead Redemption — Rockstar San Diego; Tom Clancy's Splinter Cell: Conviction — Ubisoft Montreal | **Outstanding Achievement in Art Direction**: **Red Dead Redemption** — **Rockstar San Diego**‡; Alan Wake — Remedy Entertainment, Microsoft Game Studios; Enslaved: Odyssey to the West — Ninja Theory, Namco Bandai Games; God of War III — SCE Santa Monica Studio; Kirby's Epic Yarn — Good-Feel, HAL Laboratory, Nintendo |
| **Outstanding Character Performance**: **Rob Wiethoff as John Marston** **(Red Dead Redemption)** — **Rockstar San Diego**‡; Andy Serkis as Monkey (Enslaved: Odyssey to the West) — Ninja Theory, Namco Bandai Games; Terrence C. Carson as Kratos (God of War III) — SCE Santa Monica Studio; Mark Meer as Male Commander Shepard (Mass Effect 2) — BioWare, Electronic Arts; Neil Kaplan as Tychus Findlay (StarCraft II: Wings of Liberty) — Blizzard Entertainment | **Outstanding Achievement in Gameplay Engineering**: **Red Dead Redemption** — **Rockstar San Diego**‡; Dance Central — Harmonix, MTV Games; Kirby's Epic Yarn — Good-Feel, HAL Laboratory, Nintendo; Super Mario Galaxy 2 — Nintendo EAD; Super Scribblenauts — 5th Cell, Warner Bros. Interactive Entertainment |
| **Outstanding Achievement in Online Gameplay**: **StarCraft II: Wings of Liberty** — **Blizzard Entertainment**‡; Assassin's Creed: Brotherhood — Ubisoft Montreal; Battlefield: Bad Company 2 — DICE, Electronic Arts; Call of Duty: Black Ops — Treyarch, Activision; Halo: Reach — Bungie, Microsoft Game Studios | **Outstanding Achievement in Original Music Composition**: **Heavy Rain** — **Quantic Dream**, **Sony Computer Entertainment**‡; Assassin's Creed: Brotherhood — Ubisoft Montreal; Fable III — Lionhead Studios, Microsoft Game Studios; StarCraft II: Wings of Liberty — Blizzard Entertainment; World of Warcraft: Cataclysm — Blizzard Entertainment |
| **Outstanding Achievement in Soundtrack**: **Rock Band 3** — **Harmonix**, **MTV Games**‡; Dance Central — Harmonix, MTV Games; DJ Hero 2 — FreeStyleGames, Activision; Gran Turismo 5 — Polyphony Digital, Sony Computer Entertainment | **Outstanding Achievement in Sound Design**: **Limbo** — **Playdead**‡; Assassin's Creed: Brotherhood — Ubisoft Montreal; Battlefield: Bad Company 2 — DICE, Electronic Arts; Medal of Honor — Danger Close Games, DICE, Electronic Arts; Red Dead Redemption — Rockstar San Diego |
| **Outstanding Achievement in Story**: **Mass Effect 2** — **BioWare**, **Electronic Arts**‡; Alan Wake — Remedy Entertainment, Microsoft Game Studios; Enslaved: Odyssey to the West — Ninja Theory, Namco Bandai Games; Heavy Rain — Quantic Dream, Sony Computer Entertainment; Metro 2033 — 4A Games, THQ | **Outstanding Achievement in Visual Engineering**: **Heavy Rain** — **Quantic Dream**, **Sony Computer Entertainment**‡; Call of Duty: Black Ops — Treyarch, Activision; God of War III — SCE Santa Monica Studio; Medal of Honor — Danger Close Games, DICE, Electronic Arts; Metro 2033 — 4A Games, THQ |

=== Genre awards ===
| **Action Game of the Year**: **Red Dead Redemption** — **Rockstar San Diego**‡; Battlefield: Bad Company 2 — DICE, Electronic Arts; Call of Duty: Black Ops — Treyarch, Activision; God of War III — SCE Santa Monica Studio; Halo: Reach — Bungie, Microsoft Game Studios | **Adventure Game of the Year**: **Limbo** — **Playdead**‡; Alan Wake — Remedy Entertainment, Microsoft Game Studios; Assassin's Creed: Brotherhood — Ubisoft Montreal; Enslaved: Odyssey to the West — Ninja Theory, Namco Bandai Games; Heavy Rain — Quantic Dream, Sony Computer Entertainment |
| **Casual Game of the Year**: **Angry Birds HD** — **Rovio Entertainment**, **Chillingo**‡; Bejeweled 3 — PopCap Games; Kinect Sports — Rare, Microsoft Game Studios; Pac-Man Championship Edition DX — Namco Bandai Games; Plants vs. Zombies (Note: iOS and/or Xbox Live Arcade versions.) — PopCap Games | **Social Networking Game of the Year**: **CityVille** — **Zynga**‡; Family Feud — Backstage Technologies; FrontierVille — Zynga; Nightclub City — Booyah; Ravenwood Fair — Lolapps |
| **Family Game of the Year**: **Dance Central** — **Harmonix**, **MTV Games**‡; Kirby's Epic Yarn — Good-Feel, HAL Laboratory, Nintendo; Lego Harry Potter: Years 1-4 — Traveller's Tales, Warner Bros. Interactive Entertainment; Rock Band 3 — Harmonix, MTV Games; SingStar Dance — SCE London Studio | **Fighting Game of the Year**: **Super Street Fighter IV** — **Dimps**, **Capcom**‡; BlazBlue: Continuum Shift — Arc System Works, Aksys Games; EA Sports MMA — EA Tiburon; UFC Undisputed 2010 — Yuke's, THQ |
| **Role-Playing/Massively Multiplayer Game of the Year**: **Mass Effect 2** — **BioWare**, **Electronic Arts**‡; Dragon Quest IX: Sentinels of the Starry Skies — Square Enix, Nintendo; Fable III — Lionhead Studios, Microsoft Game Studios; Fallout: New Vegas — Obsidian Entertainment, Bethesda Softworks; World of Warcraft: Cataclysm — Blizzard Entertainment | **Racing Game of the Year**: **Need for Speed: Hot Pursuit** — **Criterion Games**, **Electronic Arts**‡; Gran Turismo 5 — Polyphony Digital, Sony Computer Entertainment; ModNation Racers — United Front Games, SCE San Diego Studio; Split/Second — Black Rock Studio, Disney Interactive |
| **Sports Game of the Year**: **FIFA 11** — **EA Canada**‡; MLB 10: The Show — SCE San Diego; NBA 2K11 — Visual Concepts, 2K Games; NHL 11 — EA Canada | **Strategy/Simulation Game of the Year**: **StarCraft II: Wings of Liberty** — **Blizzard Entertainment**‡; Civilization V — Firaxis Games, 2K Games; Supreme Commander 2 — Gas Powered Games, Square Enix; Toy Soldiers — Signal Studios, Microsoft Game Studios; Warhammer 40,000: Dawn of War II - Chaos Rising — Relic Entertainment, THQ |

=== Special awards ===
==== Hall of Fame ====
- Ray Muzyka
- Greg Zeschuk

==== Lifetime Achievement ====
- Bing Gordon

==== Pioneer ====
- Bill Budge

=== Multiple nominations and awards ===
==== Multiple Nominations ====
Games that received multiple nominations
| Nominations | Game |
|---|---|
| 9 | Red Dead Redemption |
| 6 | Enslaved: Odyssey to the West |
| 6 | God of War III |
| 5 | Assassin's Creed: Brotherhood |
| 5 | Call of Duty: Black Ops |
| 5 | Heavy Rain |
| 5 | Mass Effect 2 |
| 4 | Dance Central |
| 4 | Limbo |
| 4 | StarCraft II: Wings of Liberty |
| 3 | Alan Wake |
| 3 | Angry Birds HD |
| 3 | Battlefield: Bad Company 2 |
| 3 | Kirby's Epic Yarn |
| 2 | Dragon Quest IX: Sentinels of the Starry Skies |
| 2 | Fable III |
| 2 | Gran Turismo 5 |
| 2 | Halo: Reach |
| 2 | Medal of Honor |
| 2 | Metro 2033 |
| 2 | Rock Band 3 |
| 2 | World of Warcraft: Cataclysm |

Nominations by company
| Nominations | Games | Company |
|---|---|---|
| 17 | 7 | Sony Computer Entertainment |
| 14 | 7 | Electronic Arts |
| 9 | 5 | Microsoft Game Studios |
| 9 | 1 | Rockstar San Diego |
| 7 | 4 | Nintendo |
| 7 | 2 | Namco Bandai Games |
| 6 | 2 | Activision |
| 6 | 2 | Blizzard Entertainment |
| 6 | 2 | Harmonix |
| 6 | 2 | MTV Games |
| 6 | 2 | Ubisoft Montreal |
| 6 | 1 | Ninja Theory |
| 5 | 2 | DICE |
| 5 | 1 | BioWare |
| 5 | 1 | Quantic Dream |
| 5 | 1 | Treyarch |
| 4 | 3 | THQ |
| 4 | 1 | Playdead |
| 3 | 2 | Square Enix |
| 3 | 1 | Chillingo |
| 3 | 1 | Good-Feel |
| 3 | 1 | HAL Laboratory |
| 3 | 1 | Remedy Entertainment |
| 3 | 1 | Rovio Entertainment |
| 2 | 2 | 2K Games |
| 2 | 2 | PopCap Games |
| 2 | 2 | Warner Bros. Interactive Entertainment |
| 2 | 2 | Zynga |
| 2 | 1 | 4A Games |
| 2 | 1 | Bungie |
| 2 | 1 | Danger Close Games |
| 2 | 1 | Lionhead Studios |
| 2 | 1 | Polyphony Digital |

==== Multiple awards ====
Games that received multiple awards
| Awards | Game |
|---|---|
| 5 | Red Dead Redemption |
| 3 | Heavy Rain |
| 3 | Mass Effect 2 |
| 2 | Limbo |
| 2 | StarCraft II: Wings of Liberty |

Awards by company
| Awards | Games | Company |
|---|---|---|
| 5 | 3 | Electronic Arts |
| 5 | 3 | Sony Computer Entertainment |
| 5 | 1 | Rockstar San Diego |
| 3 | 1 | BioWare |
| 3 | 1 | Quantic Dream |
| 2 | 1 | Blizzard Entertainment |
| 2 | 1 | Harmonix |
| 2 | 1 | MTV Games |
| 2 | 1 | Playdead |
