= Playing dead =

Playing dead may refer to:

- Playing dead, a variation of Planking (fad)
- Playing dead, or apparent death, an animal behaviour
- "Playing Dead", a track on the 2015 album Every Open Eye by Chvrches
- "Playing Dead", an episode of TV series Law & Order: Criminal Intent (season 8)
- "Playing Dead", a story in the book Just Tricking! by Andy Griffiths
- Playing Dead (film), a 2013 French comedy film
- Playing Dead: A Contemplation Concerning the Arctic, a book by Rudy Wiebe

== See also ==
- Play Dead (disambiguation)
