= Routine (video game) =

2025 video game

- Developer: Lunar Software
- Publisher: Raw Fury
- Producer: Jemma Hughes
- Designer: Aaron Foster
- Programmer: Pete Dissler
- Artist: Aaron Foster
- Writers: Shirley Cheung-Beal; Aaron Foster
- Composer: Nathaniel-Jorden Apostol
- Engine: Unreal Engine 5
- Platforms: Windows; Xbox One; Xbox Series X/S
- Release: December 4, 2025
- Genre: Survival horror
- Mode: Single-player

Routine is a 2025 survival horror game developed by Lunar Software and published by Raw Fury. Set on a lunar base, the story follows an unnamed protagonist unraveling a mysterious incident that led to the base's decline. The game is played from a first-person perspective, with the player exploring the base and using a special device to fight hostile robots, interact with the environment, and perform other actions.

Announced in 2012, Routine is the debut title from Lunar Software. While initially slated for a spring 2013 release, the game saw several delays attributed to a protracted development cycle, financial hurdles, and the studio's decision to temporarily pause production due to dissatisfaction with the game's direction. Development resumed in 2020 with new publisher Raw Fury. The team then overhauled various aspects of the project, including its narrative, gameplay and art design, and transitioned to Unreal Engine 5. Mick Gordon, who was originally the audio designer for the game, left the project in 2024, with Nathaniel-Jorden Apostol handling composer and audio lead duties for the remainder of development. Routine was released for Windows, Xbox One, and Xbox Series X/S in December 2025. It received generally favorable reviews from critics.

== Gameplay ==
Routine is a survival horror game played from a first-person perspective. The player controls an unnamed protagonist traversing a lunar base to unravel the mystery of its decline while encountering hostile robots. The player is equipped with a Cosmonaut Assistance Tool (C.A.T), a device used for both combat and environmental interaction, in addition to saving notes and tracking progress. Exploring levels with hidden areas, the player finds batteries, powering the C.A.T, and modules which give it tools such as a blacklight to see hidden secrets in the environment. When used as a weapon, the C.A.T can temporarily stun the enemy. Threats and environments within the levels are partially procedurally generated.

== Plot ==
In 1999, an unnamed male individual with the job title of "Senior Software Engineer" (voiced by Nathaniel-Jordan Apostol and identified only as "The Player" in the credits) awakens after a seven-day mandatory isolation period in the Arrivals wing of Union Plaza, a tourist resort on the surface of the Moon. The Player leaves his quarters and finds the facility devoid of other people and in disarray. After obtaining a Cosmonaut Assistance Tool (CAT) to interface with Union Plaza's electronic systems, the Player proceeds deeper into the facility.

Along the way, the Player finds notes, emails, and recordings that illuminate the situation. Security officer John Cooper discovered a human corpse with fungus-like growths within a fissure created by a recent moonquake. Cooper panicked and submitted a video to Union Plaza's Automated Security Network (ASN) system for analysis, but this caused it to detect an unrecognized threat and begin to malfunction. Kei Koyama, the Head of Security, was unable to fully override the ASN, and sent for an engineer to debug it. However, Cooper had brought back a mysterious illness from the corpse that spread to him and everyone on the station. The ASN attempted to use its Type-05 assistant robots to kill and quarantine the infected, resulting in the deaths of all station personnel.

The Player also experiences the disease's symptoms, including lost time episodes, and visions of the Moon and the ASN core. After shutting down the ASN, the Player suffers another lost time episode and awakens in a different lunar facility named the Ward that belonged to a group called the Prism Institute. During the 1970s, this facility hosted the Canal Exploration Mission, which studied a cavernous geological feature on the Moon named the Canal that was linked to moonquakes. It was found that the Canal exerted an anomalous psychological influence on humans and contained fungoid alien life. Eventually, two dimorphic Moon creatures invisible to the human eye yet visible through a CAT module, designated Entity A and Entity B, invaded the Ward. Entity A wandered the facility and caused no apparent harm, while Entity B was found after it choked to death on an apple and its corpse turned visible. Both creatures propagated fungal spores, the vector of the unknown disease. Some humans compulsively entered the Canal and never returned, and the rest died of the disease in the facility and were consumed by fungal growths.

The Player evades a hostile Entity A while exploring the Ward and performing tasks demanded by its computer, including an echography of the Canal. Entering the Annex building that contained the office of Prism's founder William Davis, he discovers that the lunar fungus was named EL-9. Injecting "amniotic brine" prepared by Davis into the Canal, he is able to access it directly, where he sees what is possibly EL-9's main body in the hallucinated form of a giant ASN core, surrounded by the consumed remains of the Prism personnel. The capsule opens to reveal an identical cosmonaut as him, while the EL-9 tells him in his own voice, "Through me, you endure... Through you, I endure..."

Afterward, a heavily-redacted Prism Institute report dated December 5th, 2025 that details the "PRISM Lunar Containment and Recovery Program" is shown. The report notes that the Prism Institute launched the LCRP mission earlier that year to recover data from the lost Canal expedition, and mentions the Union Plaza incident in passing. The report reveals that all contact was lost with the LCRP mission shortly after it landed and entered the Ward, and its final transmission consisted of a single image of the EL-9 blooming with flower-like growths.

== Development ==
Lead designer and artist Aaron Foster created small game projects and mods in his early years. He studied at the University of Central Lancashire, where he met designer and artist Jemma Hughes. After graduating in 2008 with a Bachelor of Arts in game design, Foster taught 3D modeling and creative thinking at the university while also working as a 3D environment artist at Eurocom. In his spare time, he developed various prototypes and ideas using Unreal Engine, with some eventually becoming the basis for Routine. The game's inspiration stemmed from a desire to combine his childhood passions—science fiction, horror, and the Moon. He also sought to "start pushing the reasons why people interact with a game," believing that games "should mean something more than pressing the right buttons to trigger cutscenes." Routine was influenced by films such as 2001: A Space Odyssey (1968), The Andromeda Strain (1971), Silent Running (1972), Alien (1979), and The Thing (1982), and the television series Space: 1999 (1975–1977). Video game influences included System Shock 2 (1999), White Day: A Labyrinth Named School (2001), and Doom 3 (2004).

In its early stages, Routine lacked enemies or interactive objects. Foster described this version as an atmospheric single-player experience similar to Dear Esther (2012). The project began to evolve with the addition of Hughes and programmer Pete Dissler, whom Foster encountered through the Mod DB website. Their collaboration led to the establishment of Lunar Software in September 2011. Working from a flat in Preston, Lancashire, the team used the living room as their office and hired freelancers for the game's art. The project was initially financed through the team's personal savings. The game's design underwent several revisions throughout its development. Following its re-announcement in June 2022, Lunar Software revealed that development had been previously suspended due to financial constraints and dissatisfaction with the project's direction. After a period of conceptual reassessment and securing a publishing deal with Raw Fury, development resumed. Raw Fury provided additional support for the game's art direction and narrative.

The selection of a lunar base as the setting for Routine stemmed not only from Foster's fascination with the Moon but also from its distance from Earth, its atmosphere of loneliness, and the in-game presence of enemies. The developers believed these aspects combined to make the Moon "a great setting for a horror experience." During development, the base's size was halved as the studio strove for level uniqueness and brevity. The number of endings was also reduced to two, impacting the overall nonlinearity originally intended. The developers decided not to explore the protagonist's personality and backstory to heighten the immersiveness and focus the player's attention on the game's atmosphere and plot.

The inclusion of permadeath was intended to heighten the impact of player actions. Foster explained that he "want[ed] to see if [... permadeath would] force people to care more about their actions rather than running around blindly thinking they can just reload the game." This feature, combined with the first-person perspective and lack of a heads-up display, reflected the developers' aim of maximizing player immersion. Procedural generation was employed to introduce variability to environments and events across playthroughs. However, the team aimed to avoid excessive randomization to preserve the integrity of the storyline. Striking a balance between variety and crafting a tense atmosphere at specific moments presented a significant challenge, according to Foster. Dissler designed the artificial intelligence of the game's enemies to adapt to and react unpredictably to the player's actions, cultivating a "fear of the unknown". The protagonist's primary device, a Cosmonaut Assistance Tool, was conceived early in development. A weapon mode was later incorporated, allowing the player to choose between stealth and direct combat. Foster characterized this as a risk–reward system, noting that its use did not always guarantee a favorable outcome. Many of these features, including permadeath, were ultimately cut after the game's prolonged development led to the change to Unreal Engine 5.

Lunar Software began developing Routine using Unreal Engine 3, but later transitioned to Unreal Engine 4. Pete Bottomley, founder and head of White Paper Games, provided support to the developers, including access to more powerful computers for working with the updated engine. After development resumed in 2020, the studio transitioned to Unreal Engine 5, overhauling various aspects of the project, including its narrative, gameplay and art design. While Lunar Software initially considered PlayStation 4 and Oculus Rift versions of the game, these plans were ultimately abandoned. Routine's visual style, inspired by 1980s retrofuturism, aimed to depict a realistically designed, abandoned lunar base. Foster described it as a "really high-tech [and] sci-fi" environment reflecting decades of human habitation and subsequent decline. The game's soundtrack, composed by Mick Gordon, known for his work on Wolfenstein: The New Order (2014) and Doom (2016), took cues from the 1980s music, as suggested by Foster. However, Gordon wanted to avoid synthesizer clichés found in soundtracks like that of Far Cry 3: Blood Dragon (2013). Citing the film The Shining (1980) as an influence, the developers sought to create a more "tangible and low-fi" sound. Gordon left the project in 2024 due to a scheduling conflict. A new audio design team was hired, but the studio still intended to use the assets that Gordon had previously created. Nathaniel-Jorden Apostol served as composer and audio lead for the remainder of development.

== Release ==
Routine was announced in August 2012 at Gamescom. Later that year, the project was approved for release on Steam through the platform's Greenlight program. Initially scheduled for a spring 2013 release for Windows and OS X, the game saw several delays. Lunar Software stopped providing development updates in 2017, but confirmed the project's continuation the following year, acknowledging some ongoing challenges. Routine was re-announced at the Summer Game Fest in June 2022. It was released on December 4, 2025 for Windows, Xbox One, and Xbox Series X/S.

== Reception ==
Reception

Aggregate scores
Aggregator	Score
Metacritic	Win: 79/100 (Note: Based on 11 scored reviews of 13 total reviews); XSXS: 79/100 (Note: Based on 7 scored reviews of 8 total reviews)
OpenCritic	77% recommend (Note: Based on 44 reviews)

Routine received "generally favorable" reviews from critics, according to review aggregator Metacritic. OpenCritic determined that 77% of critics recommended the game.
