= Who Has Your Heart =

Studio album by Amanda Richards
- Recorded: 2009
- Length: 45:44
- Label: Independent
- Producer: Amanda Richards

Who Has Your Heart is the second full-length studio album released by Amanda Richards. It was recorded at Digital MX Studios in Portland, OR and released in February 2009.

== Track listing ==
All songs written, performed and produced by Amanda Richards.

1. "Who Has Your Heart"
2. "What You See is What You Get"
3. "All I Want"
4. "Better Than It Ever Was"
5. "As Long As I Never See You Again"
6. "All But My Heart"
7. "Ballbuster"
8. "You're Finished Here, Cowboy"
9. "Hard to Get"
10. "Victim of Circumstance"
11. "You Don't Know Me"
12. "Perfect Cup of Coffee"
13. "Don't Change a Thing"
14. "Love Me"
15. "Cookies & Whiskey"

== Personnel ==
- Amanda Richards - guitar, lead vocals
- Chris Viola – electric guitar
- Casey McBride – drums
- Josh Feinberg – upright bass
- Owen Hoffman Smith – cello, upright bass
- Doug Jones – pedal steel guitar

== Production ==
- Amanda Richards – Producer
- Duane Miller – Engineer and Co-Producer
- James Holk – photography
- Communications Factory Inc. – album cover design
