= Play Dead (Amanda Richards album) =

Studio album by Amanda Richards
- Recorded: 2011
- Length: 35:17
- Label: Independent
- Producer: Amanda Richards

Play Dead is the third full-length studio album released by Amanda Richards. It was recorded at Digital MX Studios in Portland, Oregon. It was initially slotted for a short run of 400 CDs in 2011, but was later reissued in LP format in the summer of 2012.

Press releases from Richards and her band, the Hardly Hards, describe the concept album as "a collection of old-school country songs about the zombie apocalypse written from the perspective of the soon-to-be last person on Earth who happens to be a country singer and a feminist". Concerts in the Portland area in support of the album often feature the band dressing up as zombies, with Richards doused in fake blood and playing what appears to be a damaged guitar, and various other theatrical effects that reflect the dramatic and comedic themes of the music.

In 2012, the album won an Independent Music Award for "Best Concept Album".

== Track listing ==
All songs written and performed by Amanda Richards.

1. "Intro"
2. "Quarantine"
3. "Don't Leave Your Woman (When There's Walking Dead)"
4. "Is That Lipstick?"
5. "Undead in My Bed"
6. "Zombie Baby"
7. "Play Dead"
8. "No Fear, No Pain"
9. "Walking Among the Dead"
10. "Feast of Flesh"
11. "Zombyodel"
12. "Rest in Pieces"

== Personnel ==
- Amanda Richards - vocals and acoustic guitar
- Max Skewes - banjo
- Mark Powers - drums and spoons
- Dan Sullivan - bass guitar
- Doug Jones - pedal steel
- Liz Chihucos - fiddle
- Chris Viola - lead guitar
- Carrie Cunningham - background vocals
- Simon Lucas - jug blowing and knee slapping

== Production ==
- Amanda Richards - producer
- Duane Miller - engineer and co-producer
- Justin Phelps - mastering
- Communications Factory, Inc. - art direction
