= Playdead =

Danish video game developer and publisher

Playdead ApS
- Type: Private
- Industry: Video games
- Founded: 2006; 20 years ago
- Founders: Arnt Jensen; Dino Patti
- Headquarters: Copenhagen, Denmark
- Key people: Arnt Jensen
- Products: Limbo; Inside
- Number of employees: 100+ (2025)
- Website: playdead.com

Playdead ApS is a Danish independent video game developer based in Copenhagen. Game designers Arnt Jensen and Dino Patti created the company in 2006 to develop Limbo, which was released in 2010 to critical acclaim. After a year of Xbox 360 exclusivity, Playdead released ports of the game to PlayStation 3, Microsoft Windows, macOS, iOS and Android.

During Xbox's E3 2014 conference, Playdead announced its second game, Inside, which was a spiritual successor to Limbo. It was released for Xbox One, Microsoft Windows, and PlayStation 4 in 2016 to critical acclaim, and was hailed as a worthy successor to Limbo.

== History ==
Arnt Jensen, a former IO Interactive developer, drew sketches in 2004 that led him to conceptualize Limbo. Having tried programming himself and secured government grants, he then sought additional help through an art-based teaser for the game in 2006. This led to a meeting between Jensen and Dino Patti, and they realized the project was larger than the two of them, so they reached out to investors and with the money they founded the entity "Playdead ApS". (Founded by Underholdningsbranchen ApS and the investors) Playdead eventually came to have eight employees during Limbo's development, with temporary increases of up to 16 through freelancers. Limbo's success led them to be able to reacquire the company back from investors, making Playdead completely independent.

Within the same year as Limbo's release, Playdead began working on Project 2, which later become Inside. The game was partially financed by the Danish Film Institute. Considered a spiritual successor to Limbo, Inside has many of the same themes, including being a 2.5D platform game using a primarily monochrome palette. After using a custom game engine for Limbo, Playdead used Unity to simplify development and a custom temporal anti-aliasing filter which was released in March 2016 under an open-source license. The game was officially announced at the E3 2014 with planned release in 2015, was later pushed to mid-2016 for further refinement, but had a demo at PAX Prime in August 2015. Martin Stig Andersen created the soundtrack again after Limbo, creating sound via bone conduction with a human skull. Inside was first released in June for Xbox One, and later on Microsoft Windows, and received more overwhelming praise than Limbo.

Playdead's third game, which has been teased as early as January 2017, will be a "fairly lonely sci-fi game somewhere in the universe", according to Jensen. This game will likely use a third-person perspective within a 3D world, as Jensen stated that the studio has "been tired of the limitations in 2D games". Image teasers of the game were released through Playdead job listings over several months in 2019. Playdead and Epic Games announced in March 2020 that Epic Games will publish this title, providing full development costs and support of the Unreal Engine, while giving full creative control to Playdead, and will split profits 50/50 after Epic recoups its investment on release.

=== Patti's departure ===
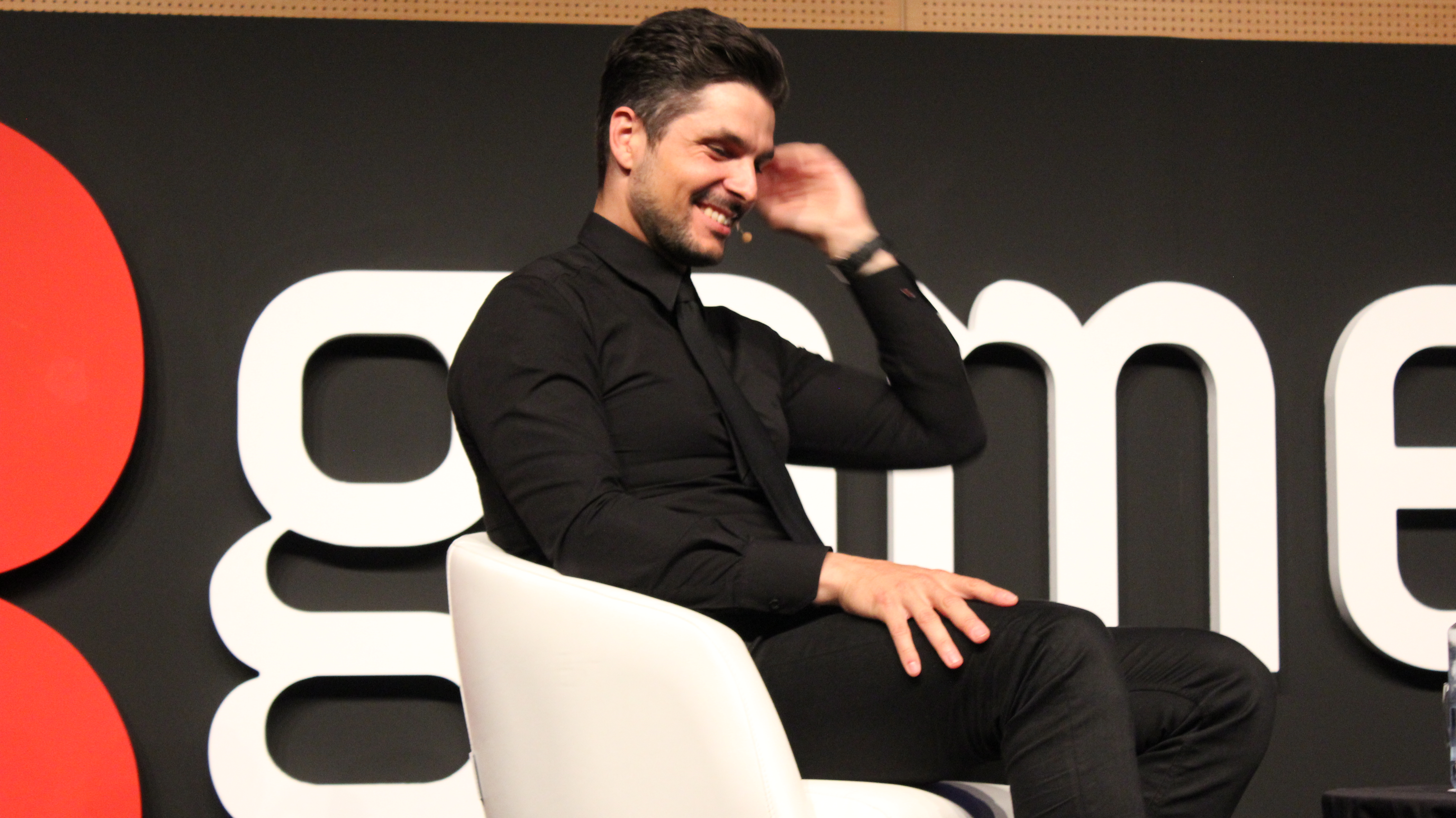
Co-founder Dino Patti in 2017

Shortly after the release of Inside, on 19 July 2016, Patti left the company, selling his shares to Jensen. Patti felt that he was leaving Playdead "in a state where it can definitely manage itself", and stated "Following almost 10 incredible years building Playdead from an idea to two dents in the games industry, I'm leaving to seek new challenges." Danish newspaper Dagbladet Børsen reported that a rift had developed between Patti and Jensen around 2015, which Patti described to Kotaku as "the supposed timeline for the next project(s) and where I am in my life now". The rift led to Jensen submitting a resignation letter to Patti from his position as creative director, though intending to stay on as a company executive. The letter had been misinterpreted by Patti as a full resignation from the company, and he subsequently removed Jensen's name from the Central Business Register for Playdead. This led to confrontation between the two and their representative lawyers that required intervention of the Danish Business Authority to resolve. This ultimately led to Patti taking a deal to sell his shares for 50 million Danish kroner (about US$7.2 million). Patti was disappointed by the way his involvement with Playdead ended, but said that "Arnt has been a really good friend and business partner for many years". Patti went on to found a new UK-based studio, Jumpship, along with film animator Chris Olsen, by June 2017. Jumpship's first game Somerville, released in 2022, has been compared favorably to Playdead's formula.

Both Playdead and Patti affirmed that in March 2025 there had been complaints sent by Playdead to Patti related to "infringement and unauthorized use of Playdead's trademarks and copyrighted works in a commercial and marketing context", and threatening to sue Patti for 500,000 kr. (around US$77,000). Jensen stated in the complaint to Patti that he had published a description of Limbo's development on his LinkedIn profile in 2024 which included use of unauthorized copyright materials, and "By providing recipients with core insights to the process of developing Limbo, you are falsely giving the impression that you played a significant role, including a creative role, in the development of the game." Patti removed the post but said that Playdead continued to pressure him on this matter. By June 2025, Patti said that Playdead had filed a formal lawsuit against him over this dispute and that Playdead was trying to remove his contribution to Limbo and Inside.

GOG.com said they were pulling Limbo and Inside from their storefront in July 2025 but without any explanation; this was speculated by players to be related to the ongoing lawsuit.

== Games developed ==
Year	Title	Platform(s)										
Year	Title	Android	iOS	Linux	macOS	PS3	PS4	Vita	Win	NS	X360	XOne
2010	Limbo	Yes	Yes	Yes	Yes	Yes	Yes	Yes	Yes	Yes	Yes	Yes
2016	Inside	No	Yes	No	Yes	No	Yes	No	Yes	Yes	No	Yes
