= Stephen Baysted =

British composer (born 1969)

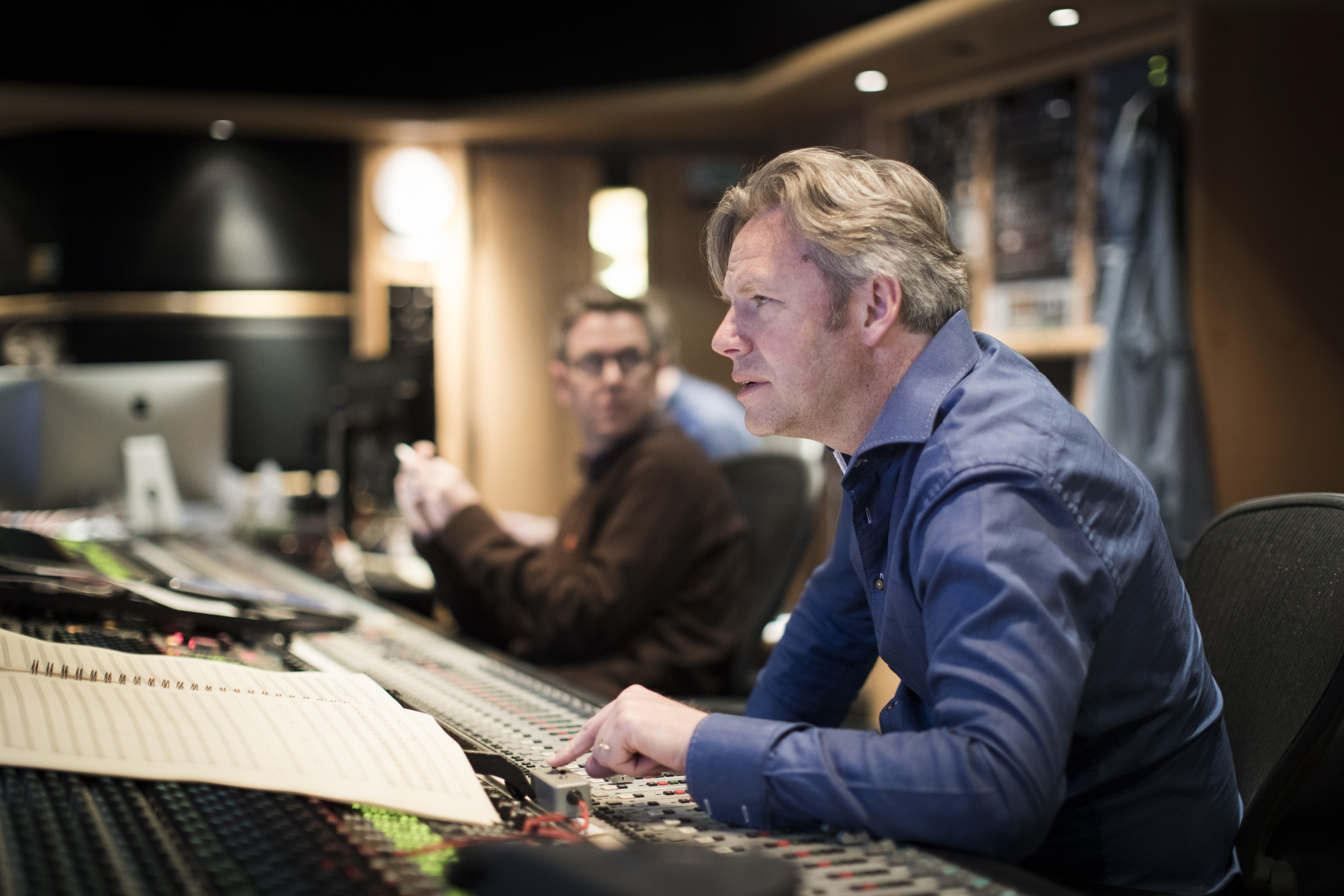
Project Cars 2 Scoring Session, Air-Lyndhurst Studios

Stephen Baysted (born 1969 in London, England) is a British composer of film, television and video game music.

Stephen’s recent scores for cinema include: Dawn of Impressionism: 1874; My National Gallery: London; Leonardo: The Works; Young Picasso; I, Claude Monet; Renoir: Reviled and Revered; The Impressionists and the Man Who Made Them and the RTS winning Matisse Live with director Phil Grabsky; the surrealist psychological drama Strange Factories; and Tim Pope‘s Brandy and Pep.

For television His work includes: 5 seasons of Blink Film’s epic documentary series Ancient Mysteries for Channel 5, Smithsonian and SBS Australia; The Queen: Mother and Monarch for Channel 4; Graveyard of the Giant Beasts for Channel 4 and PBS; the 3 part Volatile Earth series for Channel 4; 2 series for the BBC with Michelin starred chef Tom Kerridge; Great Art for Channel 4; and Shark-Croc Showdown for Discovery Channel.

For Video Games, his most recent include scores include: Project Motor Racing; Fast and Furious: Crossroads and Project Cars 3; the number one bestselling racing titles: Project Cars 2 & Project Cars; Electronic Arts’: Shift 2: Unleashed and Need for Speed: Shift; Atari’s Test Drive: Ferrari Racing Legends; and The Walking Dead: Assault.

He is Emeritus Professor of Film, TV and Games Composition at the University of Chichester.

Stephen’s work has been nominated for three Jerry Goldsmith Awards for Best Score, two Motion Picture Sound Editors ‘Golden Reel’ Awards, a Golden Joystick award, and two Game Audio NetworkGuild Awards.
