= EA Sports FC 25 =

2024 video game

- Ultimate Edition cover art
- Developers: EA Vancouver; EA Romania
- Publisher: EA Sports
- Series: EA Sports FC
- Engine: Frostbite
- Platforms: Nintendo Switch; PlayStation 4; PlayStation 5; Windows; Xbox One; Xbox Series X/S
- Release: 27 September 2024
- Genre: Sports
- Modes: Single-player, multiplayer

EA Sports FC 25 is a football simulation video game published by EA Sports. It is the second installment in the EA Sports FC series and the 32nd overall installment of EA Sports' football simulation games. The game was developed by EA Sports and was released worldwide on 27 September 2024 for Nintendo Switch, PlayStation 4, PlayStation 5, Windows, Xbox One, and Xbox Series X/S. Users who pre-ordered the Ultimate Edition of the game were able to play it on 20 September 2024.

This instalment introduces several features aimed at enhancing gameplay and player engagement, according to EA developers. The Ultimate Edition cover features football players Gianluigi Buffon, Aitana Bonmatí, Jude Bellingham, Zinedine Zidane, and David Beckham in a room filled with trophies they have won, symbolising their careers, while the Standard Edition cover features Real Madrid's Jude Bellingham alone.

== Ultimate Edition ==
EA Sports FC 25 Ultimate Edition was an optional version of the game that could be purchased for $30 extra. The version came with many benefits to start off gamers' in-game journey. These benefits included 4600 FC points to be spent in-game, early access to the game and a Player Evolution Slot, among others. Ultimate Editions are included as optional versions in all EA FC games.

== Cover art ==
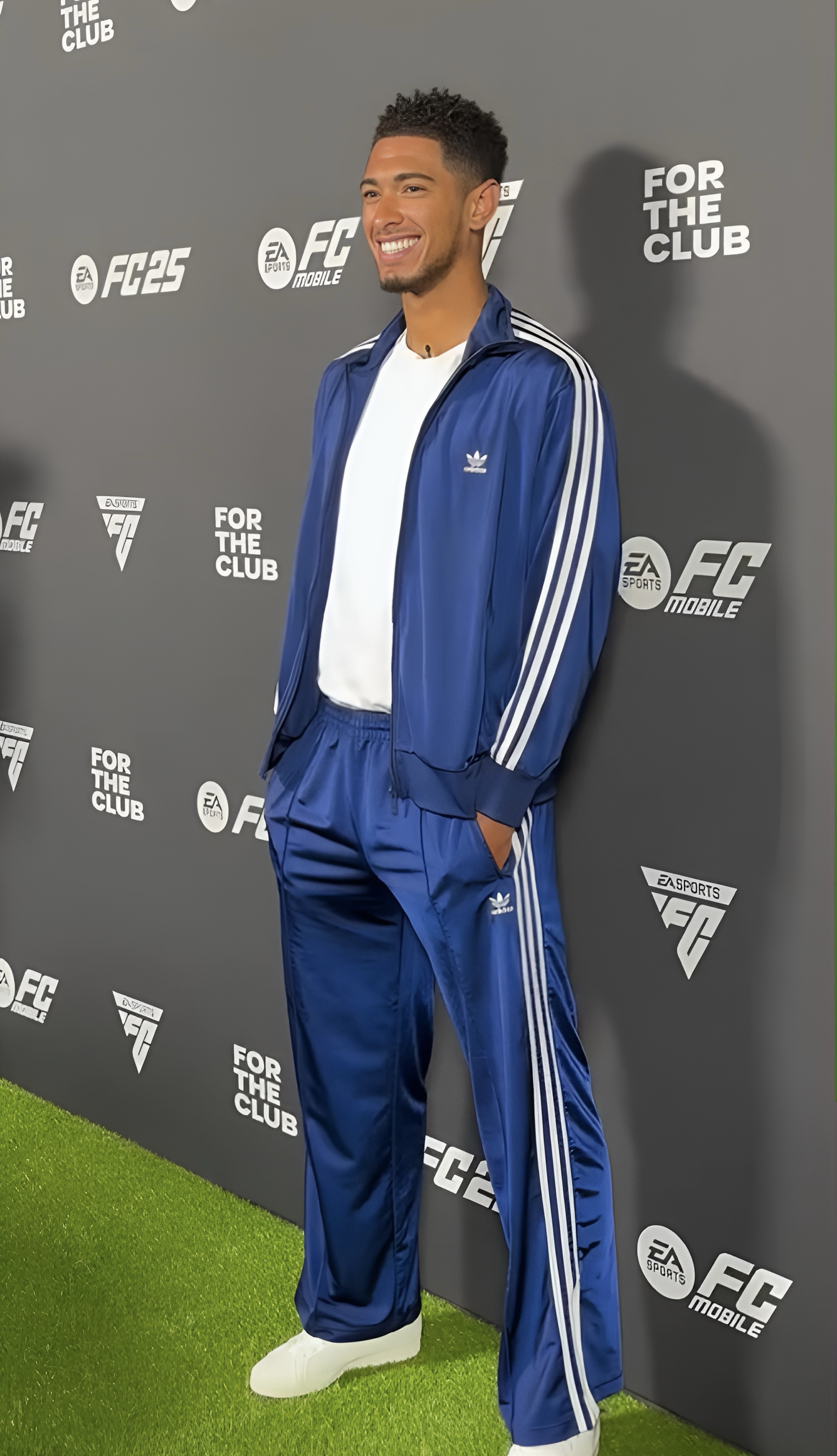
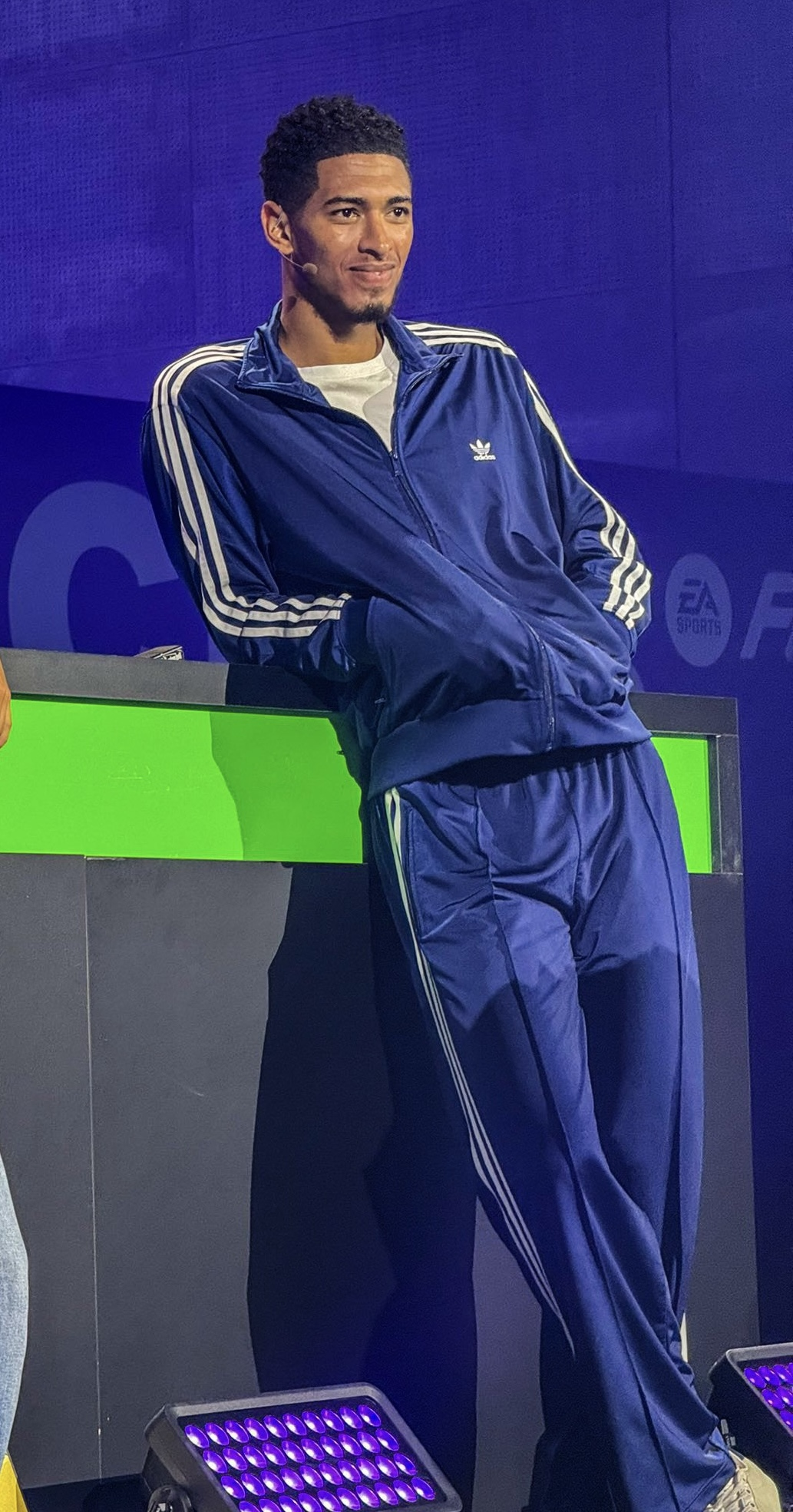
Jude Bellingham during the launch event of EA Sports FC 25 in September 2024

The cover for the Standard Edition of EA Sports FC 25 features Real Madrid and England midfielder Jude Bellingham, captured performing his signature “Belligol” celebration after scoring a stoppage-time winner during El Clásico at the Santiago Bernabéu Stadium in April 2024.

The Ultimate Edition cover showcases Bellingham alongside football legends David Beckham, Zinedine Zidane, Gianluigi Buffon, and Aitana Bonmatí. The five stars are depicted in a trophy room surrounded by 17 of the sport's most prestigious trophies, symbolizing their illustrious careers.

At 21, Bellingham becomes the youngest global cover star in EA Sports football history and the first English player to feature on the cover since 2011. While talking about being featured on the cover, Bellingham said:

"I played this game with my brother all the time growing up, and I've always thought about how incredible it would be to one day be featured on the cover. There have been so many iconic players on the cover over the years, and I am delighted to be the most recent English player to be bestowed with this honour since 2011. I'm also truly honoured to be featured on the cover of Ultimate Edition with true legends of the game both past and present in Beckham, Bonmatí, Buffon and Zidane."

== Competitions ==
The UEFA Champions League, UEFA Women's Champions League, UEFA Europa League and UEFA Conference League return.

The Premier League, La Liga, Serie A, Bundesliga, Saudi Pro League, Major League Soccer, Ligue 1 and Romanian SuperLiga are amongst the 38 different playable leagues, both men's and women's.

The Coupe de France is also fully licensed in the game. The Liga Portugal is also licensed, but without its sponsor name (Betclic), mostly due to the anti-gambling policy of EA Sports. The league and its sponsor name, however, are licensed in rival game eFootball.

== Licenses ==
Most clubs from FC 24 return, except Serie A clubs Inter Milan, SS Lazio, Atalanta and AC Milan, which are named Lombardia FC, Latium, Bergamo Calcio and Milano FC, respectively, as well as the Belgium national team, and the Canada women's national team, whom EA lost the licenses to. Serie A clubs Roma and Napoli return after four and two years respectively since their last appearances in FIFA 20 and FIFA 22. In addition, Greek club Olympiacos, who last appeared in FIFA 22, return. 11-time Azerbaijan Premier League champions Qarabag, make their debut in the franchise, as well as the Finland women's national team.

Bayern Munich and FC Barcelona play in generic stadiums, having done so since FIFA 20 and FIFA 17 respectively, as both clubs' stadiums are exclusive to KONAMI's eFootball, while Estadio Más Monumental (home stadium of River Plate), which last appeared in FIFA 19, returns.

== Ultimate Team ==
Ahead of the launch, EA Sports announced the members of a launch set of Heroes – usable cards for retired footballers and/or depicting special moments, with comic book art styles and each associated with a league for team chemistry purposes. All are new Heroes with the exception of Yaya Touré. Similarly, Icons (usable cards for retired footballers, depicting their rating at their peak; styled "ICONs" in the game), are returning to Ultimate Team, only associated with their nations for chemistry purposes. The eight new Icons are Gianluigi Buffon, Gareth Bale, Lotta Schelin, Julie Foudy, Lilian Thuram, Nadine Angerer, Aya Miyama, and Marinette Pichon.

== Career Mode ==
Career Mode offers players an immersive experience as they step into the shoes of a football club manager, guiding their team through various seasons. Players can make decisions regarding player transfers, training regimens, and tactics, while also managing the club's finances and building a fan base. The mode features player development, where young talents can be nurtured into stars, and the dynamic nature of rivalries and board expectations adds depth to the challenge.

== FC Rush ==
On 29 July 2025, FC Rush was revealed as a brand new mode, designed for fast-paced 5v5 gameplay featuring a smaller pitch, playable across Ultimate Team, Clubs, Manager Career and Kick-Off.

== FC 25 Showcase ==
On 5 December 2024, EA Sports launched a preview version of FC 25 for their new users to try out. This version contains limited versions of the Kick Off and Rush modes with a rotating selection of clubs and teams. This is the first EA-developed soccer game to contain a free playable version since FIFA 20 with the Demo version.

== Reception ==
Reception

Aggregate scores
Aggregator	Score
Metacritic	(PS5) 77/100 (XSXS) 70/100
OpenCritic	63% recommend

Review scores
Publication	Score
GamesRadar+	4/5
Hardcore Gamer	4.5/5
IGN	6/10
Shacknews	6/10
TechRadar	4.5/5
The Guardian	4/5
Video Games Chronicle	4/5

EA Sports FC 25 received "generally favorable" reviews from critics for the PlayStation 5 version and "mixed or average" for the Xbox Series X/S version, according to review aggregator Metacritic. Additionally, 63% of critics recommended the game, according to OpenCritic.

It won the award for "Best Sports / Racing Game" at The Game Awards 2024, as well as received a nomination for "Sports Game of the Year" at the 28th Annual D.I.C.E. Awards.

Despite that, in January 2025, Electronic Arts reported that the game had underperformed financially, causing the company to downgrade its financial outlook for the year. According to video game sales-tracking service GSD as of July 2025, EA Sports FC 25 was Europe's best-selling PC and console game in 2025.
