= Frostbite (game engine) =

Game engine developed by DICE

- Gameplay of Battlefield 1, which runs on Frostbite 3
- Original author: DICE
- Developer: Electronic Arts
- Release: June 2008; 18 years ago
- Written in: C++, C#
- Platform: Microsoft Windows; PlayStation 3; PlayStation 4; PlayStation 5; Xbox 360; Xbox One; Xbox Series X/S; Nintendo Switch; Nintendo Switch 2; Stadia; Luna; iOS; Android
- License: Proprietary
- Website: www.frostbite.com

Frostbite is a game engine developed by DICE and used by multiple Electronic Arts studios. It was first released in 2008 for use in Battlefield: Bad Company, and has since expanded to many other first-person shooter video games and a variety of other genres.

Titles running on the engine are released on multiple platforms, including Microsoft Windows, the eighth generation game consoles PlayStation 4, Xbox One and Nintendo Switch, the ninth generation game consoles PlayStation 5, Xbox Series X/S and Nintendo Switch 2, mobile devices running iOS and Android, the cloud streaming service Amazon Luna. Previously, Frostbite titles were released on the seventh generation game consoles PlayStation 3 and Xbox 360, in addition to the now defunct cloud streaming service Google Stadia.

== History ==
=== Frostbite 1 and 1.5 ===
Destruction in Battlefield: Bad Company on Frostbite 1

The first iteration of the Frostbite game engine made its debut in the 2008 video game Battlefield: Bad Company. The engine was developed with an HDR Audio and Destruction 1.0. HDR Audio allowed differing sound levels to be perceived by the player whilst Destruction 1.0 allowed players to destroy the environment. A newer version of Frostbite would later be employed in Battlefield 1943 (2009) and Battlefield: Bad Company 2 (2010), which would come to be known as Frostbite 1.5. In the upgraded game engine, it was now possible for players to cause enough destruction to entirely demolish structures. This version was also employed in the multiplayer aspect of Medal of Honor (2010), becoming the first video game outside of the Battlefield series to run on Frostbite.

=== Frostbite 2 ===
On 25 October 2011, Frostbite 2 made its debut in Battlefield 3. Frostbite 2 has upgrades such as deferred rendering and real-time radiosity and Destruction 3.0, which made falling debris potentially lethal to the player. Further changes to the engine included the addition of suppressive fire and disabling vehicles before destroying them. For the first time in a game that was not a shooter nor developed by DICE, Frostbite was brought to the Need for Speed series with 2011's Need for Speed: The Run, which was released on 15 November. It took a year for EA Black Box, the developer of Need for Speed: The Run, to re-purpose the game engine for driving instead of shooting. On 21 May 2012, DICE rendering architect Johan Andersson said that future personal computer video games running on Frostbite would have to be played on 64-bit operating systems. On 23 October, Medal of Honor: Warfighter became the first game of its series to feature Frostbite in both single and multiplayer. On 26 March 2013, Army of Two: The Devil's Cartel became the first third-person shooter and last video game to employ Frostbite 2.

=== Frostbite 3 ===
In March 2013, Battlefield executive producer Patrick Bach announced that Frostbite 3 would not support the Wii U, saying that "the Wii U is not a part of our focus right now." The third generation of Frostbite made its debut in Battlefield 4 on 29 October. In the updated engine, the environments became much more dynamic upon the actions of the players and Destruction 4.0, which was known as Levolution in Battlefield 4. On one map of Battlefield 4, it was possible for players to destroy a dam, causing the entire map to be flooded by water. On 13 November in San Jose, DICE's Frostbite engine technical director Johan Andersson announced that future Frostbite games and an updated version of Battlefield 4 would be powered by Mantle, a low-overhead rendering API co-developed by AMD and DICE. However, due to lack of interest and support, Mantle was phased out, with 2015's Battlefield Hardline being the last game to implement it. On 15 November, Need for Speed Rivals became the second game of its series to use the game engine and the first since the upgrade to Frostbite 3. A game in the Command & Conquer series, provisionally titled Command & Conquer: Generals 2, underwent development challenges; originally developed as a sequel to the 2003 title, the game underwent numerous changes and would be cancelled in 2013 following fan outcry over the multiplayer-oriented experience. Similarly, Shadow Realms, a BioWare title, met a similar fate, being cancelled due to the developers choosing to shift their focus to future titles, including Mass Effect: Andromeda.

First released on 25 February 2014, Plants vs. Zombies: Garden Warfare became the first game in the Plants vs. Zombies series to run on Frostbite. On 18 November, the game engine made its debut in the action role-playing genre of video games with Dragon Age: Inquisition. On 17 March 2015, Battlefield Hardline became the second game of its series to run on Frostbite 3, and the last to release on PlayStation 3 and Xbox 360. In November, Need for Speed and Star Wars Battlefront were both released under Frostbite, the 2016 Rogue One X-Wing VR Mission expansion for the latter game exclusive to the PlayStation VR and being the first VR title to use the engine. On 23 February 2016, Plants vs. Zombies: Garden Warfare 2 was released, being developed with the game engine. On 7 June, Mirror's Edge Catalyst became the first action-adventure game to run on Frostbite. On 21 October, Battlefield 1 became the third title of its series to be released under the third generation of the game engine.

On 21 March 2017, Mass Effect: Andromeda was released on Frostbite. On 10 November, Need for Speed Payback was released, running on the game engine; a week later on November 17, Star Wars Battlefront II was the last game of 2017 to be released on Frostbite. 2018's Battlefield V runs on the Frostbite 3 engine. In 2019, Anthem, Plants vs. Zombies: Battle for Neighborville, and Need for Speed Heat were all released running Frostbite.

In 2020, Star Wars: Squadrons became the second VR-compatible game to run on Frostbite, with the PC version of the game bringing VR support on PC to the engine (following its use un the aforementioned Rogue One X-Wing VR Mission expansion). On Xbox Series X and S, the game received support for high frame rates and 4K resolution, alongside visual improvements. In February 2021, a Nintendo Switch version of Plants vs. Zombies: Battle for Neighborville was announced, marking the first Frostbite title on a Nintendo console.

=== Frostbite (2021–present) ===
In November 2021, Battlefield 2042 was released for PC, PlayStation 4, Xbox One, Xbox Series X/S, and PlayStation 5, using a new version of the engine rebranded simply as "Frostbite". The new engine version, developed specifically for 2042, took 18 months of development time. In October 2022, Need for Speed Unbound was announced to be using the Frostbite engine, marking developer Criterion Games' first game using the engine. The game was released on 2 December 2022 utilizing the Battlefield 2042 version of Frostbite. The release of Unbound also marked a shift to dropping support for the PlayStation 4 and Xbox One on mainline EA titles, excluding most EA Sports titles.

The 2023 remake of Dead Space also utilizes Frostbite. In December 2023, a new logo for the engine was unveiled, and Electronic Arts announced it would retract its original strategy of developing every game under its label in Frostbite. Dragon Age: The Veilguard, which uses another version of Frostbite, was released in 2024.

The studio head of Ridgeline Games, Marcus Lehto, confirmed that the next installment of the Battlefield franchise will be developed on an upgraded version of Frostbite. This installment was later revealed to be Battlefield 6. A majority of Frostbite was rebuilt for the game, which introduced enhancements including a new movement system called the "Kinesthetic Combat System". The engine's environmental destruction system was also revamped. Battlefield 6 shipped on October 10, 2025, with a free-to-play battle royale mode which released on October 28, 2025 with optimizations for the Xbox Series S, which applied to the entire game.

The reboot of Skate shipped on Frostbite, which marks the engine's first appearance on macOS and mobile platforms. Despite the company shifting their focus to the current-generation consoles, PlayStation 5 and Xbox Series X and S, the title was released on the previous-generation PlayStation 4 and Xbox One.

=== EA Sports titles ===
Since the release of Rory McIlroy PGA Tour in 2015, Frostbite has seen use in EA Sports' annual sports titles, which previously used the Ignite engine. Following the introduction of the engine to the FIFA with the PlayStation 4, Xbox One and PC versions of FIFA 17 in 2016, the PlayStation 3, Xbox 360, and Nintendo Switch releases (the latter beginning with 2017's FIFA 18) were dubbed "Legacy Editions", instead using the last-generation Impact engine last innovated on in the console versions of FIFA 14 and excluding new features in later titles, such as The Journey campaign and new features like the UEFA Champions League mode (introduced in FIFA 19) from those editions. The Nintendo Switch versions of the titles would receive feature parity, offering an experience similar to the PlayStation 4 and Xbox One, with the release of EA Sports FC 24 in 2023, with the only exclusion being the lack of cross-platform play with the PlayStation 4 and Xbox One.

Following the FIFA transition, more EA Sports franchises transitioned to the engine. With the release of Madden NFL 18 in 2017, the Madden NFL series transitioned to Frostbite; 2021's NHL 22 marked that series' transition to Frostbite; the 2023 reboot of the PGA series, EA Sports PGA Tour, uses the engine; the EA Sports UFC series received the engine with EA Sports UFC 5; and the EA Sports College Football series transitioned to the engine with EA Sports College Football 25 in 2024.

Enhancements for the PlayStation 5 and Xbox Series X/S began in 2020 with the release of FIFA 21. Improvements featured graphical enhancements to take advantage of the newer hardware. Notably, the PC versions of FIFA did not receive these enhancements until FIFA 23 in 2022. As the new version of Frostbite was implemented into these titles, the UFC, NHL, PGA Tour and College Football franchises do not have PlayStation 4 or Xbox One versions, with Madden NFL following suit with Madden NFL 26. EA has committed to bringing both EA Sports FC and Madden NFL, which both run on Frostbite, to the Nintendo Switch 2. The first titles from said franchises to release on the platform were EA Sports FC 26 and Madden NFL 26. Madden 26 in particular runs at 40 frames per second on the Switch 2, increasing to 60 for 27, while EA Sports FC 26 introduced HyperMotion V on the Switch 2. In 2026, Frostbite came to iOS (Note: Apple A17 Pro/Apple M1 or later) and Android with the release of a dedicated EA Sports College Football mobile title.

Not all EA Sports franchises have transitioned to Frostbite. As of 2025, the only EA Sports franchises to not run on the engine are the NBA Live (the last installment used the Ignite engine), Super Mega Baseball series and Codemasters' F1 racing game series, the latter franchise using Codemasters' proprietary Ego engine. The only EA-published title in the WRC series, EA Sports WRC, used Unreal Engine 4. Additionally, EA Sports FC Mobile (formerly FIFA Mobile) for Android and iOS still utilize the last-generation Impact engine due to the limitations of mobile devices, and EA Sports FC Online (formerly FIFA Online 4) for Microsoft Windows still use the Ignite engine because of hardware requirements. Similar to FC Mobile, Madden NFL Mobile (also titled Madden NFL Overdrive from 2018 to 2019), as well as the Apple Arcade version of Madden NFL 27 still utilize a custom engine for the game instead of Frostbite also due to the limitations of mobile devices. However, on July 9, 2026, EA released EA Sports College Football Mobile, which was the first EA Sports mobile game and mobile game overall to use the Frostbite engine.

== Frostbite Labs ==
In May 2016, EA announced it had formed Frostbite Labs, a dedicated research division focusing on the development of the Frostbite engine as well as its use in future technological innovations such as VR experiences, neural networks and machine learning. Frostbite Labs is composed of a team of 30 to 40 developers operating in two offices, one in Stockholm, Sweden and the other in Vancouver, Canada.

== Modding ==
The Frosty Toolsuite is a set of community-developed tools designed to modify the files of games running on the Frostbite engine. In 2019, another tool, titled Frostbite Modding Tool, began development. Star Wars Battlefront II, FIFA/EA FC, Mass Effect, Dragon Age, Dead Space, and the Need for Speed titles all have healthy modding communities that use these tools to create mods.

In December 2025, Kyber, a community-made custom server software for the Frostbite title Star Wars Battlefront II, was released, becoming open source the following month.

== Criticism ==
Frostbite is notorious for having well-publicized difficulties, including its complexity. This led to numerous reports of development issues surrounding Frostbite titles; a majority of these issues came with the engine's usage at BioWare, which has criticized the engine for its aforementioned complexity, which made adapting common elements found in role-playing games to the engine rather difficult. Much of these criticisms stemmed from Electronic Arts pushing for the usage of Frostbite in as many titles as possible when developers were already familiarised with a certain game engine, like the Eclipse Engine (for Dragon Age); however, in 2023, Electronic Arts announced that developers were now able to develop games on any game engine. BioWare used an improved version of Frostbite for Dragon Age: The Veilguard in 2024.

=== Issues revolving around development ===
In 2014, Electronic Arts began pushing for the usage of Frostbite in many of their developers' titles. Refacilitating the engine for BioWare's 2014 title, Dragon Age: Inquisition, proved difficult for the developer; the title's executive producer, Mark Darrah, said about the engine that "...at launch we still didn't actually have all our tools working. We had our tools working enough." Prior to moving to Frostbite, the Dragon Age series utilized the Eclipse Engine. The move to Frostbite 3 resulted in BioWare cancelling a piece of downloadable content for Dragon Age II; that game received a divided audience reception, with BioWare aiming to improve on the next Dragon Age game. Adding new features to the engine for use in Inquisition proved difficult, as the engine was primarily used in first-person video games. However, issues initially faced by the development team were solved as BioWare and DICE started to cooperate better, and the engine allowed the Inquisition art team to develop extensive worlds in a short time. However, with the release scheduled for late 2014, the team resorted to extensive crunching.

With Visceral Games being tapped to publish the Star Wars title Project Ragtag, the company was occupied with the development of Battlefield Hardline; after the latter game was released, Ragtag's development suffered from many setbacks, one of them being the usage of Frostbite and their difficulties adapting it to third-person shooters. By 2017, Ragtag was ultimately cancelled and Visceral shuttered, with resources being shifted over to the then-impending development of DICE's Star Wars Battlefront II.

In 2017, Mass Effect: Andromeda suffered from multiple issues at launch due in part to the complexities of Frostbite and a troubled development. BioWare had previously faced these issues before during the aforementioned development of Dragon Age: Inquisition and would continue to do so during development of Andromeda. In 2019, sources within BioWare claimed that Frostbite's complexity had also contributed to difficulties surrounding Anthem's development. Former BioWare general manager Aaryn Flynn acknowledged these issues in an interview in November 2019.

Due to being developed in 15 to 18 months, developers of Battlefield 2042 from DICE had issues with Frostbite.

=== Security leak ===
In June 2021, tools used in the development of Frostbite, a majority of them regarding development of FIFA 21 including its source code, were leaked; the contents were released on August 2, 2021.

== Games using Frostbite ==
Title	Earliest release	Developer	Version	Platforms												
Title	Earliest release	Developer	Version	Win	PS3	PS4	PS5	X360	XOne	XSeries	NS	NS2	iOS	Android	Stadia	Luna
Anthem	22 February 2019	BioWare	3.0	Yes	No	Yes	No	No	Yes	No	No	No	No	No	No	No
Army of Two: The Devil's Cartel	26 March 2013	Visceral Games	2.0	No	Yes	No	No	Yes	No	No	No	No	No	No	No	No
Battlefield 1	21 October 2016	DICE	3.0	Yes	No	Yes	No	No	Yes	No	No	No	No	No	No	No
Battlefield 3	25 October 2011	DICE	2.0	Yes	Yes	No	No	Yes	No	No	No	No	No	No	No	No
Battlefield 4	29 October 2013	DICE	3.0	Yes	Yes	Yes	No	Yes	Yes	No	No	No	No	No	No	No
Battlefield V	20 November 2018	DICE	3.0	Yes	No	Yes	No	No	Yes	No	No	No	No	No	No	No
Battlefield 6	10 October 2025	DICE	4.0	Yes	No	No	Yes	No	No	Yes	No	No	No	No	No	No
Battlefield 1943	8 July 2009	DICE	1.5	No	Yes	No	No	Yes	No	No	No	No	No	No	No	No
Battlefield 2042	19 November 2021	DICE	3.0	Yes	No	Yes	Yes	No	Yes	Yes	No	No	No	No	No	No
Battlefield: Bad Company	23 June 2008	DICE	1.0	No	Yes	No	No	Yes	No	No	No	No	No	No	No	No
Battlefield: Bad Company 2	2 March 2010	DICE	1.5	Yes	Yes	No	No	Yes	No	No	No	No	No	No	No	No
Battlefield: Bad Company 2: Vietnam	18 December 2010	DICE	1.5	Yes	Yes	No	No	Yes	No	No	No	No	No	No	No	No
Battlefield Hardline	21 March 2015	Visceral Games	3.0	Yes	Yes	Yes	No	Yes	Yes	No	No	No	No	No	No	No
Command & Conquer	Cancelled	Victory Games	3.0	Yes	No	No	No	No	No	No	No	No	No	No	No	No
Dead Space	27 January 2023	Motive Studios	3.0	Yes	No	No	Yes	No	No	Yes	No	No	No	No	No	No
Dragon Age: Inquisition	18 November 2014	BioWare	3.0	Yes	Yes	Yes	No	Yes	Yes	No	No	No	No	No	No	No
Dragon Age: The Veilguard	31 October 2024	BioWare	3.0	Yes	No	No	Yes	No	No	Yes	No	No	No	No	No	No
EA Sports FC 24	29 September 2023	EA Vancouver	3.0	Yes	No	Yes	Yes	No	Yes	Yes	Yes	No	No	No	No	No
EA Sports FC 25	27 September 2024	EA Vancouver	3.0	Yes	No	Yes	Yes	No	Yes	Yes	Yes	No	No	No	No	Yes
EA Sports FC 26	26 September 2025	EA Vancouver	3.0	Yes	No	Yes	Yes	No	Yes	Yes	Yes	Yes	No	No	No	Yes
EA Sports FC 27	25 September 2026	EA Vancouver	3.0	Yes	No	Yes	Yes	No	Yes	Yes	Yes	Yes	No	No	No	No
EA Sports College Football 25	19 July 2024	EA Orlando	3.0	No	No	No	Yes	No	No	Yes	No	No	No	No	No	No
EA Sports College Football 26	10 July 2025	EA Orlando	3.0	No	No	No	Yes	No	No	Yes	No	No	No	No	No	No
EA Sports College Football 27	9 July 2026	EA Orlando	3.0	Yes	No	No	Yes	No	No	Yes	No	No	No	No	No	No
EA Sports College Football Mobile	9 July 2026	EA Orlando	3.0	No	No	No	No	No	No	No	No	No	Yes	Yes	No	No
EA Sports PGA Tour	7 April 2023	EA Orlando	3.0	Yes	No	No	Yes	No	No	Yes	No	No	No	No	No	No
FIFA 17	27 September 2016	EA Vancouver	3.0	Yes	Yes	Yes	No	Yes	Yes	No	No	No	No	No	No	No
FIFA 18	29 September 2017	EA Vancouver	3.0	Yes	Yes	Yes	No	Yes	Yes	No	No	No	No	No	No	No
FIFA 19	28 September 2018	EA Vancouver	3.0	Yes	Yes	Yes	No	Yes	Yes	No	No	No	No	No	No	No
FIFA 20	24 September 2019	EA Vancouver	3.0	Yes	No	Yes	No	No	Yes	No	No	No	No	No	No	No
FIFA 21	9 October 2020	EA Vancouver	3.0	Yes	No	Yes	Yes	No	Yes	Yes	No	No	No	No	Yes	No
FIFA 22	27 September 2021	EA Vancouver	3.0	Yes	No	Yes	Yes	No	Yes	Yes	No	No	No	No	Yes	No
FIFA 23	30 September 2022	EA Vancouver	3.0	Yes	No	Yes	Yes	No	Yes	Yes	No	No	No	No	Yes	No
Madden NFL 18	25 August 2017	EA Tiburon	3.0	No	No	Yes	No	No	Yes	No	No	No	No	No	No	No
Madden NFL 19	9 August 2018	EA Tiburon	3.0	Yes	No	Yes	No	No	Yes	No	No	No	No	No	No	No
Madden NFL 20	2 August 2019	EA Tiburon	3.0	Yes	No	Yes	No	No	Yes	No	No	No	No	No	No	No
Madden NFL 21	28 August 2020	EA Tiburon	3.0	Yes	No	Yes	Yes	No	Yes	Yes	No	No	No	No	Yes	No
Madden NFL 22	20 August 2021	EA Tiburon	3.0	Yes	No	Yes	Yes	No	Yes	Yes	No	No	No	No	Yes	No
Madden NFL 23	19 August 2022	EA Tiburon	3.0	Yes	No	Yes	Yes	No	Yes	Yes	No	No	No	No	No	No
Madden NFL 24	18 August 2023	EA Orlando	3.0	Yes	No	Yes	Yes	No	Yes	Yes	No	No	No	No	No	No
Madden NFL 25	16 August 2024	EA Orlando	3.0	Yes	No	Yes	Yes	No	Yes	Yes	No	No	No	No	No	No
Madden NFL 26	14 August 2025	EA Orlando	3.0	Yes	No	No	Yes	No	No	Yes	No	Yes	No	No	No	No
Madden NFL 27	13 August 2026	EA Orlando	3.0	Yes	No	No	Yes	No	No	Yes	No	Yes	No	No	No	No
Mass Effect: Andromeda	21 March 2017	BioWare	3.0	Yes	No	Yes	No	No	Yes	No	No	No	No	No	No	No
Medal of Honor (multiplayer)	12 October 2010	DICE	1.5	Yes	Yes	No	No	Yes	No	No	No	No	No	No	No	No
Medal of Honor: Warfighter	23 October 2012	Danger Close Games	2.0	Yes	Yes	No	No	Yes	No	No	No	No	No	No	No	No
Mirror's Edge Catalyst	7 June 2016	DICE	3.0	Yes	No	Yes	No	No	Yes	No	No	No	No	No	No	No
Need for Speed	3 November 2015	Ghost Games	3.0	Yes	No	Yes	No	No	Yes	No	No	No	No	No	No	No
Need for Speed Heat	8 November 2019	Ghost Games	3.0	Yes	No	Yes	No	No	Yes	No	No	No	No	No	No	No
Need for Speed Payback	10 November 2017	Ghost Games	3.0	Yes	No	Yes	No	No	Yes	No	No	No	No	No	No	No
Need for Speed Rivals	15 November 2013	Ghost Games and Criterion Games	3.0	Yes	Yes	Yes	No	Yes	Yes	No	No	No	No	No	No	No
Need for Speed: Edge	10 December 2017	EA Spearhead	3.0	Yes	No	No	No	No	No	No	No	No	No	No	No	No
Need for Speed: The Run	15 November 2011	EA Black Box	2.0	Yes	Yes	No	No	Yes	No	No	No	No	No	No	No	No
Need for Speed Unbound	2 December 2022	Criterion Games	3.0	Yes	No	No	Yes	No	No	Yes	No	No	No	No	No	Yes
NHL 22	12 October 2021	EA Vancouver	3.0	No	No	Yes	Yes	No	Yes	Yes	No	No	No	No	No	No
NHL 23	14 October 2022	EA Vancouver	3.0	No	No	Yes	Yes	No	Yes	Yes	No	No	No	No	No	No
NHL 24	6 October 2023	EA Vancouver	3.0	No	No	Yes	Yes	No	Yes	Yes	No	No	No	No	No	No
NHL 25	4 October 2024	EA Vancouver	3.0	No	No	No	Yes	No	No	Yes	No	No	No	No	No	No
NHL 26	12 September 2025	EA Vancouver	3.0	No	No	No	Yes	No	No	Yes	No	No	No	No	No	No
NHL 27	11 September 2026	EA Vancouver	3.0	No	No	No	Yes	No	No	Yes	No	No	No	No	No	No
Plants vs. Zombies: Battle for Neighborville	18 October 2019	PopCap Games	3.0	Yes	No	Yes	No	No	Yes	No	Yes	No	No	No	No	No
Plants vs. Zombies: Garden Warfare	25 February 2014	PopCap Games	3.0	Yes	Yes	Yes	No	Yes	Yes	No	No	No	No	No	No	No
Plants vs. Zombies: Garden Warfare 2	23 February 2016	PopCap Games	3.0	Yes	No	Yes	No	No	Yes	No	No	No	No	No	No	No
Rory McIlroy PGA Tour	14 July 2015	EA Tiburon	3.0	No	No	Yes	No	No	Yes	No	No	No	No	No	No	No
Shadow Realms	Cancelled	BioWare	3.0	Yes	No	No	No	No	No	No	No	No	No	No	No	No
skate.	15 September 2025	Full Circle	4.0	Yes	No	Yes	Yes	No	Yes	Yes	No	No	Yes	Yes	No	No
Star Wars Battlefront	17 November 2015	DICE	3.0	Yes	No	Yes	No	No	Yes	No	No	No	No	No	No	No
Star Wars Battlefront II	17 November 2017	DICE	3.0	Yes	No	Yes	No	No	Yes	No	No	No	No	No	No	No
Star Wars: Squadrons	2 October 2020	Motive Studios	3.0	Yes	No	Yes	Yes	No	Yes	Yes	No	No	No	No	No	No
EA Sports UFC 5	27 October 2023	EA Vancouver	3.0	No	No	No	Yes	No	No	Yes	No	No	No	No	No	No

== Notes ==
1. Excludes PlayStation 3, Xbox 360 (up to 2018's FIFA 19) and Nintendo Switch "Legacy" editions
2. Support for these platforms will be added in the future.
