= NHL 22 =

2021 video game

- Standard edition cover art featuring Auston Matthews
- Developer: EA Vancouver
- Publisher: EA Sports
- Series: NHL
- Engine: Frostbite 3
- Platforms: PlayStation 4 PlayStation 5 Xbox One; Xbox Series X/S
- Release: October 15, 2021
- Genre: Sports (ice hockey)
- Modes: Single-player, multiplayer

NHL 22 is an ice hockey simulation video game developed by EA Vancouver and published by EA Sports. It is the 31st installment in the NHL video game series and was released for the PlayStation 4, PlayStation 5, Xbox One and Xbox Series X/S on October 15, 2021. It is the first entry in the series to use the Frostbite engine, and utilizes the new game engine on all four platforms. The game features Toronto Maple Leafs center Auston Matthews as the cover athlete for the second time in the series, after being the North American cover athlete for NHL 20.

The online servers for the game were shut down on August 31, 2026.

== Features ==
New to NHL 22 is a new game engine and a graphical overhaul. The NHL series jumps to the Frostbite engine, after using the Ignite engine for the previous 7 years. Additionally, it moves to the next generation consoles PlayStation 5 and Xbox Series X/S. NHL 22 also introduces Superstar X-Factors, which are abilities that makes superstar players unique, and differentiates them from other players. This also unlocks specific animations affecting their area of expertise.

NHL 22 is feature complete on all four platforms, with the PlayStation 4 and Xbox One versions also moving to the Frostbite engine, while the PlayStation 5 and Xbox Series X/S versions won't be losing any features from the last generation counterpart. According to NHL producer Clement Kwong, the NHL team's priority this year was making sure everything would be carried over to the new Frostbite engine, as well as next generation versions so as to not repeat the same mistake with the previous console generation transition that was NHL 15. In moving to the Frostbite Engine, the NHL team is rebuilding all the arenas around the new lighting engine, allowing for enhanced particle and visual effects on the ice and elsewhere, as well as the character models are also being redone.

NHL 22 also introduces new gameplay animations, with new reverse hitting, new pass and shot blocks, new pickups, revamped puck protection, additional goalie saves/pokes, and more.

NHL 22 also introduces the new expansion team Seattle Kraken, as they join the National Hockey League in the 2021–22 NHL season. In franchise mode, you can redo the Seattle Kraken expansion draft or do a 33rd NHL team expansion draft. For the first time in the NHL series, in NHL 22 you can now share your rosters and download community made roster files with the new roster sharing feature, planned to release in December.

On January 27, 2022, women's national hockey teams were added in NHL 22 for the first time in the series.

In March 2022, publisher EA Sports announced that the Russia and Belarus national teams would be removed from NHL 22 following the former country's invasion of Ukraine. The announcement comes following the International Ice Hockey Federation's announcement that they would expel both Russia and Belarus from six tournaments by the federation in March to September 2022, along with the International Olympic Committee's announcement on banning both Russian and Belarusian athletes from all international competitions on March 1, 2022.

== Soundtrack ==
The NHL 22 soundtrack was revealed on October 6, 2021, featuring artists such as Angels & Airwaves, Grouplove, Jxdn, KennyHoopla, Machine Gun Kelly and Volbeat, and also returning from previous NHL soundtracks: Arkells, Dropkick Murphys, Imagine Dragons, Johnossi, K.Flay, Royal Blood, the Strumbellas, and Twenty One Pilots. NHL 22 has the largest soundtrack in the series to date, featuring 43 songs.

== Reception ==
Reception

Aggregate score
Aggregator	Score
Metacritic	(PS5) 71/100 (XSX) 74/100

Review scores
Publication	Score
Hardcore Gamer	4/5
IGN	6/10
Push Square	6/10
Shacknews	6/10

NHL 22 received "mixed or average" reviews on PlayStation 5 and "generally favorable" reviews on Xbox Series X according to review aggregator Metacritic. Kimberley Wallace of Game Informer awarded the game a 7.25, and summed up her review by saying "NHL 22 relies on its superstar talent, and it's not impressive enough to give the gameplay the new life it so desperately needs."

== Notes and references ==
References
