= EA Sports FC =

- EA Sports FC logo
- Genres: Sports simulation (football)
- Developers: EA Vancouver; EA Romania; EA Mobile; EA Spearhead; KLab Games
- Publishers: EA Sports; Nexon; Tencent Games; Garena
- Platforms: Microsoft Windows, Nintendo Switch, Nintendo Switch 2, PlayStation 4, PlayStation 5, Xbox One, Xbox Series X/S, Amazon Luna, iOS, Android
- First release: EA Sports FC 24; 29 September 2023
- Latest release: EA Sports FC 27; 25 September 2026

EA Sports FC is an association football simulation video game franchise developed by EA Vancouver and EA Romania and published by EA Sports. It serves as the direct successor to their former FIFA series, which was discontinued following the termination of EA and FIFA's licensing agreement, and is a continuation of EA Sports' football simulation games.

The first main instalment in the series, EA Sports FC 24, was launched on 29 September 2023, following a one week early access period for Ultimate Edition users, which serves as its 31st overall instalment. In addition, FIFA Online 4 was updated as EA Sports FC Online on 22 September 2023, while FIFA Mobile was updated to EA Sports FC Mobile globally on 26 September 2023. The second main instalment in the series, EA Sports FC 25 was launched on 27 September 2024, with the Ultimate Edition being released a week before on 20 September. The Ultimate Edition of the game comes with in game bonuses such as FC Points, Early Access, and Players.

== History ==
On 10 May 2022, EA Sports and FIFA announced that their long-term licensing agreement would end upon its conclusion on 31 December 2022, following a one-year extension to allow for the release of FIFA 23.

Despite the rebranding, the franchise retained its licenses of more than 19,000 players, 700 teams, 100 stadiums and 30 leagues from FIFA 23.

On 7 May 2026, EA Sports announced that they purchased the license from AFC and have the license of AFC Asian Cup.

== Games ==
Release timeline
2016	EA Sports FC Mobile
2017
2018	EA Sports FC Online
2019
2020
2021
2022
2023	EA Sports FC 24
2024	EA Sports FC Tactical
2024	EA Sports FC 25
2025	EA Sports FC 26
2026	EA Sports FC 27

=== Main instalments ===
==== EA Sports FC 24 ====
- Released for: Nintendo Switch, PlayStation 4, PlayStation 5, Xbox One, Xbox Series X/S, Windows
- Release date: 29 September 2023

==== EA Sports FC 25 ====
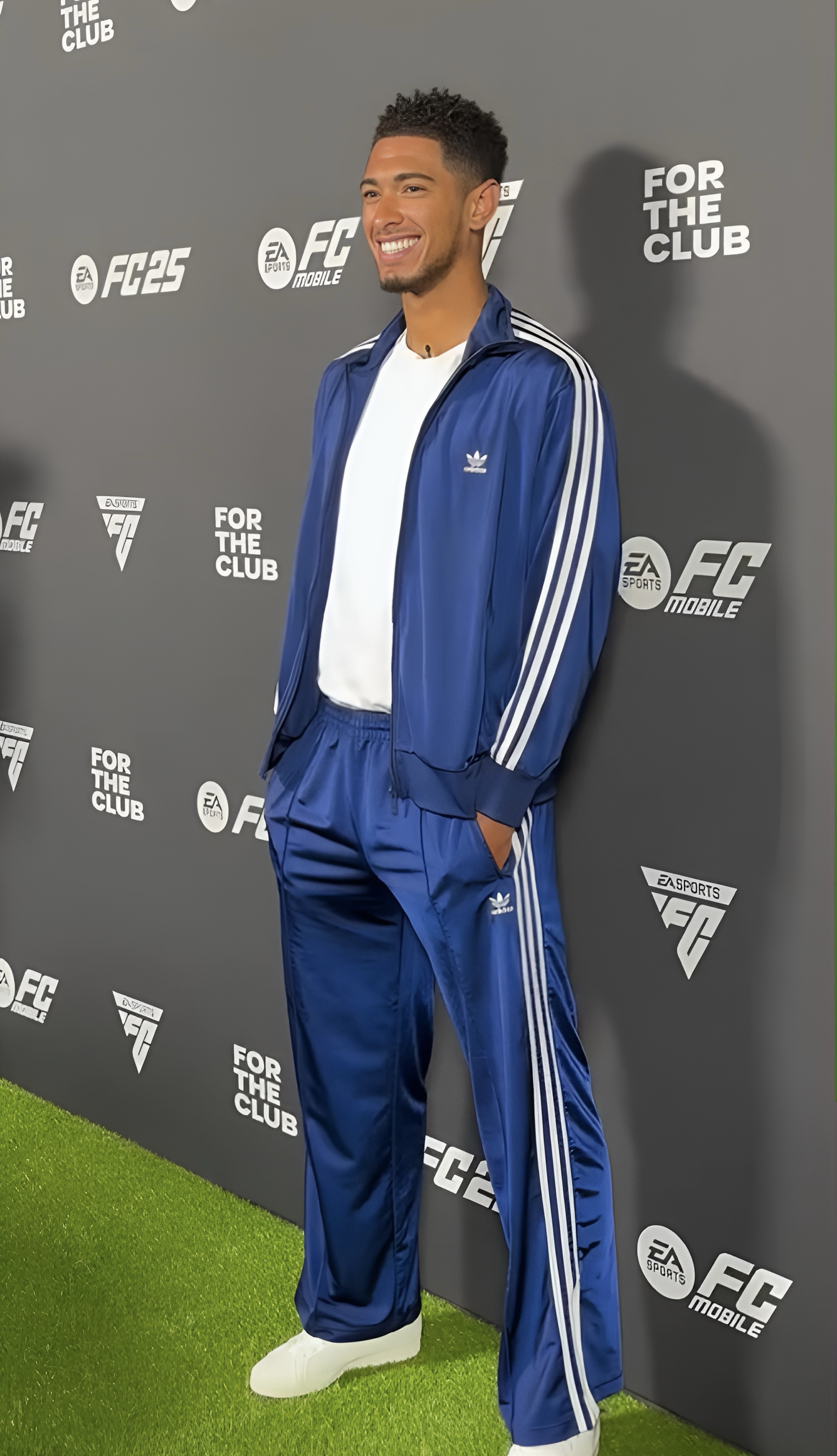
Jude Bellingham during the EA Sports FC 25 launch event

- Released for: Nintendo Switch, PlayStation 4, PlayStation 5, Xbox One, Xbox Series X/S, Windows
- Release date: 27 September 2024

==== EA Sports FC 26 ====
- Released for: Microsoft Windows, PlayStation 4, PlayStation 5, Xbox One, Xbox Series X/S, Nintendo Switch, Nintendo Switch 2 and Amazon Luna
- Release date: 26 September 2025

==== EA Sports FC 27 ====
- Released for: Microsoft Windows, PlayStation 4, PlayStation 5, Xbox One, Xbox Series X/S, Nintendo Switch and Nintendo Switch 2
- Release date: 25 September 2026

=== Other instalments ===
==== EA Sports FC Mobile ====
- Cover Athlete(s): Vinícius Júnior (26 September 2023 – 2024), Erling Haaland (2024), Jude Bellingham (2025 – 2026), Kylian Mbappé (2026 - present)
- Released for: iOS, Android
- Release date: 26 September 2023

In 2023, EA Sports FC Mobile succeeded the FIFA Mobile game series in the launch of EA Sports FC Mobile 24 on 26 September 2023. Following the split between EA and FIFA, features included cross-regional play, power shots, new skills, the return of a global market, new Spectator Mode, and a new UEFA Champions League tournament mode.

==== EA Sports FC Online ====
- Released for: Windows
- Release date: 17 May 2018

On 22 September 2023; FIFA Online 4 was renamed EA Sports FC Online, following the split between EA and FIFA. The game is an online free-to-play version of EA Sports FC for Asian market. The game allows players to play regular matches with 2v2 or 3v3 matches like the main series as well as the Ultimate Team feature seen in other games. The game allows the ability to buy players from a marketplace and help build their stats by purchasing items.

==== EA Sports FC Tactical ====
- Released for: iOS, Android
- Release date: 22 May 2024 (in Hong Kong, Macau, Taiwan, Singapore, Malaysia, Thailand, and Indonesia).
