= FIFA 23 =

2022 video game

- The Ultimate edition cover art features Paris Saint Germain's Kylian Mbappé and Chelsea's Sam Kerr.
- Developers: EA Vancouver; EA Romania
- Publisher: EA Sports
- Series: FIFA
- Engine: Frostbite 3
- Platforms: Nintendo Switch; PlayStation 4; PlayStation 5; Windows; Xbox One; Xbox Series X/S; Stadia
- Release: 30 September 2022
- Genre: Sports
- Modes: Single-player, multiplayer

FIFA 23 is a football video game published by EA Sports. It is the 30th and final installment in the FIFA series that is developed by EA Sports, and released worldwide on 30 September 2022 for Nintendo Switch, PlayStation 4, PlayStation 5, Windows, Xbox One, Xbox Series X/S, and Stadia.

Kylian Mbappé and Sam Kerr are the cover athletes for the standard and legacy editions.

Listed in Guinness World Records as the best-selling sports video game franchise in the world, the game is the final under the 29-year partnership between EA and FIFA. Future football games by EA are named under the banner of EA Sports FC, beginning with EA Sports FC 24. The game's online servers shut down on October 30, 2025.

== Features ==
=== Crossplay ===
FIFA 23 features a degree of crossplay. Crossplay is available in FIFA Ultimate Team (FUT) Division Rivals (excluding co-op), FUT Champions, FUT Ultimate Online Draft, FUT Online Friendlies (excluding Co-Op), FUT Play a Friend, Online Friendlies, Online Seasons (excluding Co-Op Seasons) and the Virtual representation of the Bundesliga. However, crossplay is limited to consoles that fall within the same console generation. For example, those on the PlayStation 4 are able to play with and against players on Xbox One, but not the PlayStation 5 or Xbox Series X/S, and vice versa. Pro Clubs will not support crossplay.

The decision to omit Pro Clubs from crossplay has received criticism from the FIFA community.

Furthermore, the option to delete Ultimate Team data has been removed due to most players not using that option, while an option to rename the club's name outside of the Objectives screen has been added instead. In previous FIFA titles, players can only use the Delete Club option 4 times, as they are allowed to create a club 5 times.

=== HyperMotion2 and Technical Dribbling ===
The game features what is being dubbed as "HyperMotion2", a system of match capture with machine learning from real life football matches to create over 6,000 in-game animations. "Technical Dribbling" uses what is being called the "Active Touch" system to improve the footballer's path to the ball and improve a player's turning and dribbling with more responsiveness. Both systems are exclusive to current-generation versions (i.e. PS5, Xbox Series X/S and PC).

=== World Cup game modes ===
FIFA 23 features the men's World Cup game mode and the women's World Cup game mode, replicating the 2022 FIFA World Cup and the 2023 FIFA Women's World Cup. This is the only title in the series to feature both World Cups as special modes.

The 2022 FIFA World Cup mode was released on 9 November for all platforms except for the Nintendo Switch Legacy Edition. The mode contains only two out of eight stadiums: Al Bayt and Lusail Iconic Stadium. The mode also contains each of the 32 teams that qualified for the 2022 tournament, along with fifteen other national teams that are featured in the game and did not qualify: Austria, China, Czech Republic, Finland, Hungary, Iceland, Italy, New Zealand, Northern Ireland, Norway, Republic of Ireland, Romania, Scotland, Sweden, and Ukraine. The World Cup mode in FIFA 23 is the last World Cup mode since the new generation of FIFA games will go under the name of EA Sports FC; therefore will not get licensing from FIFA.

On 19 June 2023, it was announced that the 2023 FIFA Women's World Cup mode would be released around the end of June 2023. The update was released on 27 June 2023, replicating the 2023 FIFA Women's World Cup tournament and featuring the 32 qualified teams. The mode also contains only one of the ten stadiums: Stadium Australia; whereas the rest take place in generic arenas.

=== New icons and removed icons ===
FIFA 23 features three new icons to its ICON Collection with the addition of Gerd Müller, Xabi Alonso and Jairzinho. With new addition to these three, 8 of the previously added icons are missing from the Icons List released by EA Sports. Diego Maradona, Ryan Giggs, Pep Guardiola, Deco, Marc Overmars and Filippo Inzaghi have been removed as icons for FIFA 23. Jay-Jay Okocha and Hidetoshi Nakata have been removed as icons for FIFA 23, but are now featured as heroes.

=== New Heroes ===
FIFA 23, in an exclusive deal between EA Sports and Marvel, features 21 new heroes to the existing heroes collection from FIFA 22, which now feature comic book art styles, with the additions of: Lúcio, Jean-Pierre Papin, Rudi Völler, Diego Forlán, Rafael Márquez, Javier Mascherano, Ricardo Carvalho, Tomas Brolin, Harry Kewell, Yaya Touré, Claudio Marchisio, Landon Donovan, Joan Capdevila, Sidney Govou, Dirk Kuyt, Park Ji-sung, Włodzimierz Smolarek, Saeed Al-Owairan and Peter Crouch, with the late addition of Ledley King after the game's release.

=== Women's club football ===
This entry in the FIFA video game series is the first to introduce women's club football. England's FA Women's Super League and the French Division 1 Féminine are included at launch, with more women's football leagues planned to be added later on. This comes alongside Sam Kerr, who plays for Chelsea Women, becoming the first female footballer to feature on the global front cover of the game. On 18 October 2022, EA Sports announced the inclusion of the UEFA Women's Champions League in the game for early 2023. On 6 March 2023, EA announced the addition of the UEFA Women's Champions League and the National Women's Soccer League beginning on 15 March 2023. On 14 March, EA announced the UWCL and NWSL update would be available by 23 March due to issues encountered during testing.

=== Licences ===
FIFA 23 contains over 30 licensed leagues, over 100 licensed stadiums, over 700 clubs and more than 19,000 players. Roma, Atalanta, Lazio and Napoli are not featured in FIFA 23 due to their exclusivity agreements with rival game eFootball, and are instead known as Roma FC, Bergamo Calcio, Latium, and Napoli FC respectively. The game retains the players' likenesses, but the official badge, kits and stadiums are replaced with custom designs and generic stadiums created by EA Sports. Juventus, having been similarly absent for the past three entries and thus known as Piemonte Calcio, are featured in the game however.

The game no longer feature the teams of the J1 League, due to EA and J.League's six-year partnership coming to an end. Almost all Latin American leagues were also removed from the game, with only the Argentine Primera División remaining; the teams that contend the Copa Libertadores and Copa Sudamericana are also still present. The Russian Premier League remained absent from the game as well, due to the ongoing Russian invasion of Ukraine.

New stadiums added to the game include the Philips Stadion, home of PSV Eindhoven, the Europa-Park Stadion, home of SC Freiburg, the BMO Stadium, home of Los Angeles FC, and the Academy Stadium, home of Manchester City Women. The Juventus Stadium, home of Juventus, and La Bombonera, home of Boca Juniors, are also added, having been absent from the past few entries due to licence issues. Nottingham Forest's home ground, the City Ground, was added post-launch via an update, thus ensuring all 20 Premier League clubs have their respective stadiums. Bayern Munich and Barcelona are also featured in the game with licensed players and kits, but do not have their stadium licenses and thus play in generic stadiums, as well as all Serie B teams, which were licensed for the first time in the series.

The game features fictional club AFC Richmond and their stadium Nelson Road from the Apple TV+ series Ted Lasso.

== Soundtrack ==
Alongside the game's main soundtrack, 40 of the 100 popular tracks from previous FIFA titles — collectively known as the "Ultimate FIFA Soundtrack" — were added to the game in November 2022. These songs included "Song 2" by Blur (FIFA: Road to World Cup 98), "Love Me Again" by John Newman (FIFA 14), "The Nights" by Avicii (FIFA 15) and many more. As a result of these additions, FIFA 23's soundtrack is the largest in the series. The game's VOLTA soundtrack features songs written by RAYE, David Asante, Central Cee, Nas, Curtis Richa and Disclosure.

== Reception ==
Reception

Aggregate scores
Aggregator	Score
Metacritic	PC: 77/100; PS5: 76/100; XSXS: 79/100
OpenCritic	61% recommend

Review scores
Publication	Score
Famitsu	34/40
Game Informer	7.25/10
GameSpot	7/10
GamesRadar+	4/5
Hardcore Gamer	4/5
IGN	PS5: 7/10; NS: 2/10
Nintendo Life	2/10
PCGamesN	7/10
Push Square	7/10
The Guardian	4/5
Video Games Chronicle	4/5
VG247	3/5
VideoGamer.com	7/10

FIFA 23 received "generally favorable" reviews, according to review aggregator website Metacritic. Fellow review aggregator OpenCritic assessed that the game received strong approval, being recommended by 61% of critics. The Nintendo Switch version was widely panned, with critics deriding EA for not adding any significant improvements over previous versions of the game. Writing for GamesRadar+, Ben Wilson criticized the gameplay, citing the game's pay-to-win aspects, along with moments where "player control felt sabotaged"; though stated that the series bowed out on a high and expressed encouragement for EA Sports FC scheduled for next year. Game Informer praised the title, stating that it's “flashy, fun to play and has a lot of modes”, but criticized its similarity to previous installments of the series.

IGN rated the game a 7/10 and said "FIFA 23’s slick and dramatic virtual football is fitting for the series’ last hurrah under its long-time name, but familiar frustrations abound, and it still greatly undervalues some of its most beloved modes."

It was nominated for the British Academy Games Award for Multiplayer at the 19th British Academy Games Awards as well as for Sports Game of the Year and Online Game of the Year at the 26th Annual D.I.C.E. Awards.
