= EA Sports UFC 5 =

- Standard edition cover art featuring Valentina Shevchenko and Alexander Volkanovski
- Developer: EA Vancouver
- Publisher: EA Sports
- Director: Brian Hayes
- Producer: Nate McDonald
- Series: EA Sports UFC
- Engine: Frostbite
- Platforms: PlayStation 5; Xbox Series X/S
- Release: October 27, 2023
- Genres: Fighting, sports
- Modes: Single-player, multiplayer

EA Sports UFC 5 is a mixed martial arts fighting video game developed by EA Vancouver and published by EA Sports. Serving as the sequel to EA Sports UFC 4 (2020), it was released on October 27, 2023, for PlayStation 5 and Xbox Series X/S.

== Gameplay ==
UFC 5 features a new damage system that renders injuries realistically.

Like its predecessor, UFC 5 is a fighting game based on the mixed martial arts promotion Ultimate Fighting Championship (UFC). UFC 5 features a revamped damage system which allows the game to render blood and sweat realistically and show different combinations of facial damages during combat. Injuries will impact a fighter's performance. For instance, a bruised eye may result in impaired vision. If the player character is severely injured, the match will be temporarily paused or halted completely by a ring doctor. The grappling system is also streamlined, allowing players to initiate submission attempts faster and more seamlessly when compared with UFC 4.

The game features a career mode, which sees the return of Coach Davis introduced in UFC 4. The goal of the player is to become the "G.O.A.T". The game also features an online career mode, in which player's own custom characters fight against other characters created by other players, and a fight contract mode which generates a match with AI-controlled fighters on a daily basis.

== Development ==
EA Vancouver served as the game's lead developer. UFC 5 was the first game in the series developed using Frostbite instead of Ignite. The engine change extended the game's development length for about a year. It is the second EA Sports title and the first since Fight Night Champion (2011) to receive a Mature (M) rating by the ESRB due to the game's realistic injury system as well as stronger language in the career mode. According to game producer Nate McDonald, the team opted for a more mature rating as they wanted to portray the "visceral" nature of UFC fights authentically.

UFC 5 was announced in September 2023 and was released for PlayStation 5 and Xbox Series X and Series S on October 27, 2023. Players who purchase the Deluxe Edition can gain access to the game three days earlier and unlock three additional fighters (Fedor "The Last Emperor" Emelianenko, "The Greatest of All Time" Muhammad Ali and "Iron" Mike Tyson). EA supported the game with free updates, with the Vancouver studio adding new fighters at regular intervals.

== Reception ==
Reception

Aggregate score
Aggregator	Score
Metacritic	(PS5) 78/100 (XSX) 80/100

Review scores
Publication	Score
Game Informer	8/10
GameRevolution	6/10
IGN	9/10

According to review aggregator Metacritic, the game received "generally positive reviews" from critics upon release.

Tanner Smith from IGN strongly praised the game and called it "the best MMA game", praising its attention to details, the new damage system which prompts players to review their strategy mid-fight, and career mode's deeper focus on narrative. Brian Shea from Game Informer noted that despite the game's shortcomings (such as "glaring omissions" in its UFC roster of characters and the repetitive nature of the career mode), it nonetheless "delivers an exciting MMA experience", and that "the adrenaline rush that comes with knocking your opponent out in a fierce back-and-forth battle makes it hard to resist the allure of stepping back into the Octagon for one more fight".

Nicholas Tan from Game Revolution gave the game a more negative review, criticizing the game's lack of substantial upgrades when compared with UFC 4, and noted that players who enjoy the single-player component of UFC games may find the career mode in UFC 5 to be nearly identical to its predecessors.

UFC 5 was the seventh best-selling game released in physical format in the UK in its week of release. In the EU, it was the 12th most downloaded game of 2024. It reached number 7 in the USA.
