= EA Sports FC 24 =

2023 video game

- Ultimate Edition cover art
- Developers: EA Vancouver; EA Romania
- Publisher: EA Sports
- Series: EA Sports FC
- Engine: Frostbite 3
- Platforms: Nintendo Switch; PlayStation 4; PlayStation 5; Windows; Xbox One; Xbox Series X/S
- Release: 29 September 2023
- Genre: Sports
- Modes: Single-player, multiplayer

EA Sports FC 24 is an association football-themed simulation video game developed by EA Vancouver and EA Romania and published by EA Sports. It is the inaugural installment in the EA Sports FC series, succeeding the FIFA video game series after Electronic Arts's partnership with FIFA concluded with FIFA 23. EA Sports FC 24 is the 31st overall installment of EA Sports' football simulation games, and was released on 29 September 2023 for Nintendo Switch, PlayStation 4, PlayStation 5, Windows, Xbox One, and Xbox Series X/S.

== Cover art ==
The cover for the Standard Edition of the game features Manchester City striker Erling Haaland. The cover for Ultimate Edition of the game features 31 iconic current and former players from around the world in a style akin to the cover of the album Sgt. Pepper's Lonely Hearts Club Band. Among the notable figures are Sam Kerr, Virgil van Dijk, Son Heung-min, Zinedine Zidane, Pelé and David Beckham.

When the Ultimate Edition cover was revealed, fans commented on the poor resemblance of many figures to the real life players they represented, bringing into question whether the likenesses in the game would also be bad. Electronic Arts vice president John Shepherd soon after stated that the in-game likenesses would be improved. Shepherd explained that EA had wanted to include a large number of players to reflect the many league and club licenses they had for EA Sports FC 24, and that dealing with the approvals for so many players and kits had made designing the cover art more complex. EA had also received feedback from players after the cover debuted. Besides concern for the game graphics, fans also joked about the figures and how unintentionally funny some of the faces appeared, particularly the figure of Andrea Pirlo looking "lost" or like a Hobbit at the back; possibly a late addition to the cover, Pirlo did not appear in the other promotional material released at the same time.

Fans also noted the absence of Kylian Mbappé, Lionel Messi, and Cristiano Ronaldo from the Ultimate Edition cover.

== Features ==
=== HyperMotion V ===
HyperMotion technology was first introduced in FIFA 22, with EA touting the HyperMotion V technology used in EA Sports FC 24 as the "biggest leap forward"; promotion for the game highlighted the feature prominently. Volumetric data from 180 matches featuring predominantly English and Spanish professional men's and women's teams was used in developing the technology. It is used only in the regular version of the game, available on Windows for PC, PlayStation 5 and Xbox Series X and Series S.

The match data was collected from "cameras around the stadiums", meaning the in-game figures would move more like their real-life counterparts, and was also used to train EA Sports FC's proprietary machine learning algorithms. The machine learning used the data to learn what realistic footballing movement is like, and how to recreate it in other figures. The cameras captured all players on the pitch at once, further informing team movement for the game, as well as ball physics. As well as the cameras, EA used data recorded by StretchSense gloves worn by (outfield) players to record data on how hands moved while playing, training the game's AI on this.

EA also improved their AcceleRATE feature, to AcceleRATE 2.0, with HyperMotion V. Previously, figures were rated with one of three acceleration archetypes that affected their movement when running; AcceleRATE 2.0 uses seven archetypes, though they are still assigned automatically based on physical features rather than on player data (the figure's speed is informed by player statistics).

=== PlayStyles ===
Another well-promoted addition to EA Sports FC 24 was PlayStyles, a feature of the in-game footballer figures that better represent the real footballers' unique styles. The data used to create and assign PlayStyles was "optimised by Opta Sports". An extension of this feature, PlayStyles+, are a further enhanced version of PlayStyles attributed to elite players. EA used the Opta Sports data to create 34 PlayStyles in 6 categories, which represent various roles in a squad: scoring, passing, ball control, defending, physical, and goalkeeping (the last was limited to the Be a Goalkeeper modes in Player Career and Clubs).

In previous games, players have been able to use modifiers to allow the footballer figures to play in different positions. With the introduction of PlayStyles, including footballers' alternative realistic positions, and an upgraded chemistry system, the modification option was removed.

It is also possible to switch between automatic precision passing and controlling pass mechanics by gamer input.

=== Ultimate Team ===
Having previously been named "FIFA Ultimate Team", the FIFA brand prefix was dropped in line with the games series' rebranding. A new development for Ultimate Team in EA Sports FC 24 was the addition of Evolutions, a mode that allows gamers to improve certain player cards for use in Ultimate Team, giving stats boosts and new PlayStyles. Women's footballers were included in Ultimate Team for the first time, with gamers able to use both men and women on the same team: the release roster had Alexia Putellas, Erling Haaland, Kevin De Bruyne and Kylian Mbappé tied for the highest overall rating at 91.

Similarly, Icons (usable cards for retired footballers, depicting their rating at their peak; styled "ICONs" in the game) and Hero (usable cards for retired footballers and/or depicting special moments, with comic book art styles created by Marvel) included women's footballers for the first time, with the initial five Icons being Mia Hamm, Birgit Prinz, Homare Sawa, Camille Abily and Kelly Smith. The men's Icons at release were Zico, Bobby Charlton and Franck Ribéry. The first three women's Heroes were Nadine Keßler, Sonia Bompastor and Alex Scott (who also appears in the game series as a broadcaster). There were two Teams of the Year for the first time, with the addition of a Women's Team of the Year for gamers and fans to vote on, in addition to the Men's Team of the Year. After the 4-3-3 Teams of the Year were revealed, gamers also voted for a 12th player for both teams from the remaining nominees.

Men's and Women's EA Sports FC 24 Teams of the Year
Team	Goalkeeper	Defenders	Midfielders	Forwards	12th Player
Men's	(Brazil) Alisson Becker (Liverpool)	(France) Théo Hernandez (Milan) (Netherlands) Virgil van Dijk (Liverpool) (Portugal) Rúben Dias (Manchester City) (Netherlands) Jeremie Frimpong (Bayer Leverkusen)	(Belgium) Kevin De Bruyne (Manchester City) (Spain) Rodri (Manchester City) (England) Jude Bellingham (Real Madrid)	(France) Kylian Mbappé (Paris Saint-Germain) (Argentina) Lionel Messi (Inter Miami) (Norway) Erling Haaland (Manchester City)	(Portugal) Cristiano Ronaldo (Al Nassr)
Women's	(England) Mary Earps (Manchester United)	(France) Sakina Karchaoui (Paris Saint-Germain) (France) Wendie Renard (Lyon) (England) Millie Bright (Chelsea) (Spain) Ona Batlle (Barcelona)	(Spain) Alexia Putellas (Barcelona) (Germany) Lena Oberdorf (VfL Wolfsburg) (Spain) Aitana Bonmatí (Barcelona)	(United States) Sophia Smith (Portland Thorns) (Norway) Caroline Graham Hansen (Barcelona) (Australia) Sam Kerr (Chelsea)	(Germany) Alexandra Popp (VfL Wolfsburg)

=== Clubs and VOLTA Football ===
Clubs and VOLTA Football modes remained mostly unchanged, with updated graphics and more game options. EA Sports FC 24 also introduced cross-platform play in the modes, for users on same-generation consoles, thereby expanding cross-play to all of the game's online multiplayer modes.

=== Nintendo Switch updates ===
The FIFA video games released for the Nintendo Switch since FIFA 20 had been "legacy" editions, each preserving the same game as FIFA 19 with only minor updates (typically only new kits each year) over multiple releases. EA Sports FC 24 was the first game to have a substantial update on Nintendo Switch, bringing it closer in line with (though still technologically behind) the version for other platforms.

The Frostbite game engine was used to run the Switch version for the first time, providing similar gameplay to the PlayStation 4 and Xbox One versions of the game. The Ultimate Team experience and VOLTA Football were also improved in line with the general version, but despite this, the Switch game does not support cross-platform play with either PlayStation 4 or Xbox One. The use of Frostbite included capping the frame rate at 30fps, when previously it had been higher.

The HyperMotion technology is not available on Switch, and there was no Ultimate Edition released for Switch.

=== Platform availability ===
Platform	Feature											Ultimate Edition	
Platform	HyperMotion V	AcceleRATE 2.0	PlayStyles	Ultimate Team	Clubs and VOLTA	Career modes	Local seasons	Cross-platform play (Note: Cross-platform play available between PS4 and Xbox One, and between PS5, PC, and Xbox Series X/S)	Single-device multiplayer	Touchscreen mode	Founders (Note: Founders Status provides exclusive in-game items for playing the game before November 1, 2023.)	Game	PC Pack (Note: Ultimate Edition on PC includes 4,600 FC points.)
Nintendo Switch	No	No	Yes	Yes	Yes	Yes	Yes	No	Yes	Yes	Yes	No	No
PlayStation 4	No	No	Yes	Yes	Yes	Yes	No	Yes	Yes	No	Yes	Yes	No
PlayStation 5	Yes	Yes	Yes	Yes	Yes	Yes	No	Yes	Yes	No	Yes	Yes	No
Windows (PC)	Yes	Yes	Yes	Yes	Yes	Yes	No	Yes	No	No	Yes	Yes	Yes
Xbox One	No	No	Yes	Yes	Yes	Yes	No	Yes	Yes	No	Yes	Yes	No
Xbox Series X/S	Yes	Yes	Yes	Yes	Yes	Yes	No	Yes	Yes	No	Yes	Yes	No

== Licenses ==
On 10 May 2022, EA Sports and FIFA announced that their long-term licensing agreement would end upon its conclusion on 31 December 2022, following a one-year extension to allow for the release of FIFA 23. On the same day, EA announced that their football video game franchise FIFA would be rebranded under the name EA Sports FC in 2023 and that they were retaining the licenses to players, teams, stadiums, and leagues. New licenses acquired for EA Sports FC 24 include a variety of women's leagues, including Spain's Liga F and Germany's Frauen-Bundesliga. EA also revealed at a game presentation event in July 2023 that they had made exclusive deals with UEFA, England's Premier League and Spain's La Liga, and would include their competitions in the EA Sports FC series.

Roma, Atalanta, Lazio and Napoli are not featured in EA Sports FC 24 due to their exclusivity agreements with rival game eFootball, and are instead known as Roma FC, Bergamo Calcio, Latium, and Napoli FC respectively. The game retains the players' likenesses, but the official badge, kits and stadiums are replaced with custom designs and generic stadiums created by EA Sports. Bayern Munich and Barcelona feature in the game with licensed players and kits, but in generic stadiums due to lack of stadium licenses.

As well as the game continuing to have an iconic soundtrack, several musical artists partnered with EA to design kits that could be used in the game. Kits designed by Michaël Brun and Obongjayar were available for purchase, while one designed by the Rolling Stones was unlockable. The Rolling Stones kit in the game was released shortly after Barcelona and Barcelona Femení players wore a real Rolling Stones kit, with both featuring the iconic logo.

EA Sports FC 24 is also the first game in the franchise to include the license of the Ballon d'Or.

In English, Guy Mowbray and Sue Smith act as the secondary commentary team in the game's Kick-off and Ultimate Team modes, alternating with Derek Rae & Stewart Robson.

In November 2023, it was announced that EA Sports had picked up the rights for the UEFA Euro 2024 video game, and that the Euro 2024 final tournament downloadable update would be coming to EA Sports FC 24, EA Sports FC Mobile, and EA Sports FC Online in the summer of 2024. Likewise, 2024 Copa América content was added to EA Sports FC 24's Ultimate Team and EA Sports FC Mobile in June 2024, although a standalone tournament mode was not made available in the game.

== Reception ==
EA Sports FC 24

Aggregate score
Aggregator	Score			
Aggregator	NS	PC	PS5	Xbox Series X/S
Metacritic	67/100		76/100	77/100

Review scores
Publication	Score			
Publication	NS	PC	PS5	Xbox Series X/S
GameSpot			7/10	
IGN	4/10		7/10	
Nintendo Life	8/10			
PC Gamer (UK)		79/100		
AVForums		6/10		

=== Regular version reviews ===
EA Sports FC 24 received "generally favorable" reviews, according to review aggregator Metacritic.

IGN's Andrew McMahon and GameSpot's Richard Wakeling both rated the game 7/10, assessing that it was much like previous installments with some additions but mostly incremental improvements to its longstanding gameplay.

McMahon and Wakeling praised the added realism and smoothness of HyperMotion and the updated graphics and animations; both also criticised the AI, touted as an improvement on the FIFA series' use, as disappointing, particularly with goalkeepers. They praised several of the developments, including the Evolutions mode of Ultimate Team. McMahon described the PlayStyles as "genuinely impressive" in how many players' attributes were captured, and that applying PlayStyles to customizable players "[makes] a world of difference". Wakeling said that "it feels much more satisfying to perform [relevant] actions" based on a figure's PlayStyle.

Reviewers responded positively to the inclusion of women's players in Ultimate Team, as it adds not only more player options but also more squad building choices given the different styles and attributes. McMahon was satisfied with the nostalgic VOLTA, but was disappointed in the developments to the Career Mode, with both him and Wakeling considering them detrimental.

=== Nintendo Switch version reviews ===
Chris Scullion of Nintendo Life gave the game 8/10 stars, celebrating the near-parity with other consoles and the many new play options for Switch gamers. It particularly highlighted the Ultimate Team experience, something which had previously been a replica of FIFA 17's version on Switch, now including all of the features which had been gradually added over the previous seven years on other consoles. He concluded that it is "the best football game ever released on a Nintendo system." McMahon's review of the Switch version of EA Sports FC 24 compared it to the same game on other consoles, rather than comparing with past FIFA games on Switch, and gave it 4/10 stars. He noted that the lack of HyperMotion was both a detriment in itself and also made the PlayStyles feature very limited. Likening the gameplay and graphics quality to something from 2006, McMahon also noted that many of the new graphics elements that made the game feel more modern were absent from the Switch version. He also felt it was the best handheld football game, but qualified that "if you have the option then you'll find a much more enjoyable and modern version on any other platform."

Scullion had welcomed the inclusion of VOLTA on the Switch version, saying that its mini-game and local multiplayer-based gameplay was probably more ideal for the portable Switch than other consoles, though McMahon rated VOLTA poorly due to its need for other online players and the lack of Switch users interested in the mode, making it difficult to access at all.

Pocket Tactics' Connor Christie gave the game 8/10, saying it was fluent despite the reduced frame rate.

=== Audience response ===
The game was review bombed by players early in its release, many of whom complained about a perceived lack of difference from the previous installment and several bugs. One prominent bug was the Ada Hegerberg figure in Ultimate Team, popular due to her 89 overall rating, running away from the ball and otherwise being unusable. Hegerberg herself received abuse from gamers. Some players reacted negatively to the inclusion of women's players, particularly female Icons, in Ultimate Team, though others felt such a reaction was "pathetic" and similar sentiments. EA responded to players who did not want to play with or against teams featuring women by recommending they use "Kick Off" or other modes that use teams and leagues directly matching those in real life. A common explanation given by players who did not want to see women included was that it would break the realism of the game; this was rejected by video game media, which explained that the game had sacrificed realism in its most popular modes long ago with retired player cards and special cards. The Caroline Graham Hansen figure in Ultimate Team was particularly popular, with Graham Hansen having an influential season for Barcelona. As such she received multiple "overpowered special card[s]" for use in the game throughout the release. Graham Hansen's Team of the Year card was one of the highest-rated in the game.

Players and critics negatively responded to the Elite Season Opener Pack loot box, feeling that EA were aggressively pushing the pay-to-win option of Ultimate Team more than usual: the pack was made available during an early access period that players already paid a premium to play, and was worth the equivalent of $30 (it could be purchased as a microtransaction with real currency or with in-game coins earned by winning games). Besides the timing and cost, the value of the items in the pack was deemed sub-par, further angering players. Wakeling, noting the controversy in his review, wrote that "it's more than a little dystopian that [EA is] still asking for extra money from its already-paying customers."

During the release of Team of the Year cards in the game, one card-swapping challenge to earn a random prize related to the Team of the Year initially had much higher odds of awarding players the Lionel Messi Team of the Year card, one of the highest-rated in the game. When more Messi cards were awarded than intended, EA changed the odds of the challenge to reduce the chance of receiving the Messi card. The error and response was criticized by players, as some had purchased the Messi card with in-game coins for a cost much higher than the challenge.

In February 2024, the loyalty reward "for you" packs in Ultimate Team, loot boxes made available only to players with certain amounts of gaming time accrued up to that point, were released. However, players still had to pay for these loyalty packs, which could be up to the equivalent of $20 each. EA was criticized as "shameless" for once again asking for more money to access rewards relating to something players already paid for.

=== Sales ===
EA Sports FC 24 reached 11.3 million players in its first week. It was the top-selling video game for physical copies in the UK for the two weeks following its release.

=== Awards and nominations ===
Year	Ceremony	Category	Result	Ref.
2023	The Game Awards 2023	Best Sports / Racing Game	Nominated	
2024	27th Annual D.I.C.E. Awards	Sports Game of the Year	Nominated	
