= Rom Di Prisco discography =

Rom Di Prisco is a contemporary Canadian composer and electronic audio producer of music for video games, movies and television programs. He also produces remixes for other music artists. This article lists his works.

== Video games ==
Title	Company	Platform	Year	Additional Notes
Xtreme Sports Arcade	GT Interactive	Windows	-	
Rebel Moon Rising	GT Interactive	Windows	1997	
Need for Speed II	Electronic Arts	PlayStation / Windows	1997	
Need for Speed III: Hot Pursuit	Electronic Arts	PlayStation / Windows	1998	
World Cup 98	EA Sports	PlayStation	1998	
Sled Storm	EA Sports Big	PlayStation	1999	
Carnivores 2	WizardWorks	Windows	1999	
Need for Speed: High Stakes	Electronic Arts	PlayStation / Windows	1999	
NHL 2000	EA Sports	PlayStation / Windows	2000	
FIFA 2000	EA Sports	PlayStation / Windows	2000	
007 Racing	Electronic Arts	PlayStation	2000	
Need for Speed: Porsche Unleashed	Electronic Arts	Windows	2000	
Rune	Human Head Studios	Windows / Mac	2000	
SSX	EA Sports Big	PS2	2000	
Blair Witch Volume 2: The Legend of Coffin Rock	Gathering of Developers	Windows	2000	
Rune: Viking Warlord	Take 2 Interactive	PS2	2000	
NHL 2001	EA Sports	PS2 / Windows	2001	
Rune: Halls of Valhalla	Human Head Studios	Windows / Mac	2001	
SSX Tricky	EA Sports Big	PS2 / GameCube / Xbox	2001	
Need for Speed: Hot Pursuit 2	Electronic Arts	PS2 / GameCube / Xbox / Windows	2002	
NHL 2002	EA Sports	PS2 / Xbox / Windows	2002	
SpyHunter 2	Midway	PS2 / GameCube / Xbox	2003	
Dead Man's Hand	Atari	Xbox / Windows	2004	
Prey	3D Realms	Xbox 360 / Windows	2006	Concept music / ambient soundscapes
Full Auto	Sega	Xbox 360	2006	
Full Auto 2: Battlelines	Sega	PS3 / PSP	2006	
Unreal Tournament 3	Epic Games	Xbox 360 / PS3 / Windows	2007	
Mass Effect 2	BioWare	Xbox 360 / Windows / PS3	2010	Additional music
ModNation Racers	United Front Games	PS3 / PSP	2010	Concept music / adaptive music tests
Guacamelee!	DrinkBox Studios	PS3, PSvita, Windows	2013	Fifth place TSA 'game of the year' (soundtrack) with Peter Chapman.
Need For Speed (2015 video game)	Electronic Arts	PS4, Xbox One, Windows	2015	
Paragon	Epic Games	PS4, Windows	2016	
Fortnite	Epic Games	PS4, Xbox One, Nintendo Switch, Windows, Android, iOS	2017	
Guacamelee! 2	DrinkBox Studios	PS4, Xbox One, Nintendo Switch, Windows	2018	
Foxhole	Siege Camp	Windows	2022	

== Film and television ==
Show	Network	Medium	Year	Notes
Hip Hop Honors	VH1	TV	-	
Spy on the Wild	Animal Planet	TV	-	
The Young and the Restless	CBS	TV	1973 -	
Blair Witch Experience	Artisan Entertainment	DVD	1999	
The Sopranos	HBO	TV	1999 - 2007	
Cribs	MTV	DVD	2000 -	
Trading Spaces	TLC	TV	2000 - 2007	
Made	MTV	TV	2002	
Making the Band 2	MTV	DVD	2002	
Ride with Funkmaster Flex	Spike TV	TV	2003 - 2004	
NCIS	Paramount Television	TV	2003 -	
America's Next Top Model	UPN	TV	2003 -	
Popular	WB Television Network	DVD	2004	
Pimp My Ride	MTV	TV	2004 - 2007	
Megastructures	National Geographic Channel	TV	2004 -	
My Super Sweet 16	MTV	TV	2005 - 2008	
Alien Planet	Discovery Channel	DVD	2005	
Trick It Out	MTV	TV	2005	
Saw II	Image Entertainment	CD	2005	Soundtrack
Apollo: The Race against Time	History Channel	TV	2005	
Biography	A&E	TV	2006	Episode Stevie Wonder
Gastineau Girls	E!	DVD	2006	
Conspiracy Files	Discovery Channel	TV	2006	
Hottest MCs in the Game	MTV	TV	2007 -	
Diary: 50 Cent	MTV	TV	2007	
Rags to Riches: Akon	VH1	TV	2008	
Twilight Special: ‘Love Bites’	MTV	TV	2009	
Eddie Griffin: Going For Broke	VH1	TV	2009	
Chopped	Food Network	TV	2009 -	
Cool In Your Code	NYC Media	TV	2010	
Sci vs. Fi: Mass Effect	Syfy Channel	TV	2010	

== Music releases ==
Album	Artist	Label	Medium	Year	Notes
Noughty	-	Koyote Records UK	Vinyl / CD	-	
Bluetooth	-	Koyote Records (UK)	Vinyl / CD	-	
Fetish Revolution	-	Viceroy Music (Germany)	CD	-	
Songs for Choice	Rom di Prisco	dPulse Recordings	CD	-	
Don't Regret It	-	Minus Habens Records	12" Vinyl	-	
Astro Tektonics	-	Defective Records	12" Vinyl	-	
The Eye of Andromeda	-	Mindspore Records	CD	-	
Metamorph six, replicants	di Priscus	Brute Records UK	12" Vinyl	1997	
Remix Dys Temper	Skinny Puppy	Nettwerk Records	CD	1998	remix
This is Groove	Various	Hypnotic Records	CD	1999	
Summer Night Sessions	Michael Dog	Liquid records	CD	1999	
Wild Planet	cEvin Key (Skinny Puppy)	Nettwerk Records	CD	1999	compilation
Disconnected	Bitstream Dream	Self-released	CD	2000	
Machineries of Heaven: Velvet Black / Imagine	di Priscus	Koyote Records (UK)	12" Vinyl	2000	
TimeLAB	Various	Futureshock Records (UK)	12" Vinyl	2000	
Unquiet Grave	Various	Cleopatra Records	CD	2000	
In My Arms Again	Red Flag (US)	Plan B Records	CD	2000	synth-pop
She: A Female Trip - Hop Experience	Various	Sonic Images Records	CD	2001	
Blunted 3	Various	Shadow Records	CD	2001	
Cool Terrasse	Various	CH Musiq Records (Switzerland)	CD	2002	
Balance 003	Bill Hamel (Australia)	EQ Recordings	CD	2002	
Let the Drums Speak	DJ Hardware	Artemis Records	CD	2002	
12 Tales	Various	Instinct Records	CD	2002	
With or Without You	Powerplant	Teknology / Sunkissed Records	12" Vinyl	2002	
Bedrock 4	John Creamer and Stephane K	Bedrock Records	Vinyl / CD	2002	
Connected	Bitstream Dream	Self-released	CD	2003	
Trance Sessions 2	Various	Shadow Records	CD	2003	
Integration	Bitstream Dream	Self-released	CD	2004	
OM Lounge 8	Various	Om Records	Vinyl / CD	2004	
Never Let Me Down	Richard Vission	System Recordings	CD	2004	
Remixes EP	The Postmarks (Florida, USA)	Unfiltered Records	CD	2006	
Spiralglide	Bitstream Dream	Self-released	CD	2006	
Octaves	Powerplant (UK)	Powerplant Music	CD	2007	Remix
Worked Over Nasty	3kStatic	dPulse Recordings	DD	2007	
Voodoo Science	3kStatic	dPulse Recordings	CD	2007	
Out for Blood	Unit 187	Vendetta Music	CD	2010	
Cryptidalia	Rom di Prisco	Independent	CD	2010	
Nitro	Christopher Lawrence	Hook Recordings	12" Vinyl	2011	
