= Need for Speed: High Stakes =

1999 video game

- North American cover art featuring a Porsche 911 Turbo and a Ferrari 550 Maranello
- Developers: EA Canada (PS); EA Seattle (PC)
- Publisher: Electronic Arts
- Producer: Hanno Lemke
- Composers: Rom Di Prisco; Saki Kaskas; Crispin Hands
- Series: Need for Speed
- Platforms: PlayStation; Microsoft Windows
- Release: PlayStation: NA: March 24, 1999; EU: April 2, 1999; Windows: NA: June 16, 1999; UK: June 25, 1999
- Genre: Racing
- Modes: Single-player, multiplayer

Need for Speed: High Stakes, released as Need for Speed: Road Challenge in Europe, is a 1999 racing video game developed by EA Canada and EA Seattle and published by Electronic Arts for the PlayStation and Microsoft Windows. It is the fourth game in the Need for Speed series and a follow-up to Need for Speed III: Hot Pursuit. The game features more realistic elements than its predecessors and introduced a damage system that allows cars to take damage when colliding with objects, affecting their appearance and performance. It also introduced a series of economy-based tournaments, awarding players with a cash prize that can be spent on repairing, purchasing, or upgrading cars for subsequent races. The game's Hot Pursuit mode, which was introduced in Hot Pursuit, was expanded with more options, allowing players to control police pursuits attempting to stop racers.

High Stakes was designed to convey a sense of risk and consequence, an idea that is primarily reflected in the game's High Stakes mode, where a player can lose a saved car in a race, along with the money they had spent on upgrading it. Because the game features licensed cars, Electronic Arts had to convince manufacturers to let their cars take in-game damage. High Stakes also marked the return of the Porsche license, which had been absent from racing games since Porsche Challenge in 1997. The game received positive reviews from critics, who occasionally compared it to Gran Turismo. Critics praised its graphics, artificial intelligence, and realistic elements, but criticized its inconsistent frame rate. The Microsoft Windows version was awarded Racing Game of the Year by Computer Gaming World. The game was followed up by Need for Speed: Porsche Unleashed in 2000.

== Gameplay ==
The player, controlling a Mercedes-Benz SLK 230, is trying to overtake two opponents. The player's position is shown at the bottom right corner.

Need for Speed: High Stakes is a racing game where players race exotic cars on various tracks set in North America and Europe. The game allows one or two players to race against computer-controlled opponents or compete against each other via split-screen. Cars are grouped into categories and range from the more affordable performance models such as the BMW Z3 and the Chevrolet Camaro to the more exotic sport cars such as the Ferrari F50 and the McLaren F1. Cars can take damage when colliding with objects, affecting their appearance and performance. Each track has multiple variants, including the direction, which can be forward or backward, and a mirror mode, which reverses curves left-to-right and right-to-left. Races can take place at night or during the day and may include weather conditions.

High Stakes features several game modes, which include Single Race, Hot Pursuit, Tournament, Knockout, and High Stakes. Single Race is a customizable mode where players can participate in a single race. Options include the car and track selection, and the number and skill level of computer-controlled opponents. Hot Pursuit is a single race mode that includes police pursuits attempting to stop racers who abuse speed limits. Police pursuits have the ability to request back-up, roadblocks, and spike strips if necessary. Players can choose to control either the racers or the pursuits. If there are two players, both can team up as pursuits attempting to stop computer-controlled racers or play as racers evading computer-controlled pursuits. It is also possible for one player to control a racer while another tries to stop them as a pursuit.

Tournament and Knockout modes are pre-set events that consist of a series of races on different tracks. In a Tournament, players are awarded points for their finishing position in each race. The racer with the most points at the end of a Tournament is the winner. In Knockout races, the last opponent at the end of each race is eliminated. The winner is the final racer left after all of the opponents have been knocked out. Event races award players with a cash prize, which can then be spent on repairing, purchasing, or upgrading cars for subsequent races. Completing pre-set events is essential to progress through the game, as they unlock more cars and tracks and, in some cases, additional events. Some events have vehicle restrictions or require players to pay an entry fee. High Stakes is a race mode that consists of only two opponents, where the winner is given the loser's car instead of a cash prize. In the PlayStation version of the game, this mode is optional and can only be played by two players in a single race, best-of-three, or best-of-five series. The winning player gets the losing player's car transferred to their memory card.

Unlike the PlayStation version of the game, the Microsoft Windows version features a Career mode that organizes all of the game's pre-set events into tiers. Each tier consists of a number of Tournament or Knockout events and may include a High Stakes race, where the player must bet their car against a computer-controlled opponent. If the player wins a High Stakes race, they can then sell or use the loser's car to progress through the Career mode. When a tier is completed, more challenging ones are gradually unlocked. Completing the most challenging tiers generally requires players to purchase and upgrade expensive cars. The Microsoft Windows version also includes an online multiplayer mode, allowing players from two different computers to play together via modem or serial link, or up to eight players to race against each other over a local area network or the internet.

== Development and release ==
High Stakes was developed by EA Canada as a follow-up to Need for Speed III: Hot Pursuit. When Hot Pursuit was completed, the development team took some days off and brainstormed ideas for their next project based on feedback from gamers and online sites. These included the game's car damage system and being able to play as a police pursuit. The title "High Stakes" was chosen to convey the game's sense of risk and consequence, an element that senior producer Hanno Lemke felt was missing from many racing games. This was represented in the game's High Stakes mode, where a player can lose a saved car in a race, along with the money they had spent on upgrading it. The fact that cars can take damage, requiring players to spend money and repair them, was considered another contributor to that sense of risk and consequence, as it can potentially lead players into debts. The game marked the return of the Porsche licence, which had been absent from racing games since Porsche Challenge in 1997.

Creating a sense of realism was equally important. Features such as customizable licence plates, functional turn signals, hazard lights, and reverse lights were implemented to make cars more believable, while extra details such as car interiors and drivers were made visible during gameplay. Before implementing the car damage system, Electronic Arts spent a considerable amount of time convincing car manufacturers to let their licensed cars take in-game damage. One of the biggest challenges the development team faced was that the studio had to move offices during the Christmas 1998 season. It occurred in the middle of a crunch period the development team was facing. This resulted in a loss of three weeks of work time, requiring developers to work late night hours over subsequent weeks to meet the release deadline. The game was confirmed to be in development in December 1998, after information on the game had been leaked by some sources. High Stakes was first released for the PlayStation in North America on March 24, 1999. The game was released in Europe as Need for Speed: Road Challenge on April 2, and in Japan as Over Drivin' IV on June 17.

The Microsoft Windows version was developed by EA Seattle, a studio based in Bellevue, Washington. It supports both 3D acceleration and software rendering, and features several graphical improvements over its PlayStation counterpart. For example, cars are rendered with a higher number of polygons. Other enhancements include detailed 3D dashboards that light up during night time driving and individual headlight output with both high and low beams. At EA Seattle, using die-cast cars was a common practice for artists to determine how polygonal models should be integrated into the game, while trips to visit automakers in Europe were often arranged to collect reference material. The Microsoft Windows version also includes nine extra tracks from Hot Pursuit and allows players to alternatively listen to an audio CD of their choice during gameplay. The game went gold, and was released in North America on June 16, 1999, and in the United Kingdom on June 25. Shortly after its release, additional cars were made available for players to download via the Electronic Arts and Need for Speed websites. These include the Ferrari 360 Modena, the Lister Storm, the Aston Martin DB7, and the Jaguar XJR-15.

== Reception ==
Reception

Aggregate score
Aggregator	Score
Metacritic	86/100

Review scores
Publication	Score
Computer Gaming World	5/5
Computer and Video Games	3/5 (PS); 4/5 (PC)
Game Informer	8.75/10
GameRevolution	A−
GameSpot	8.7/10 (PS); 8.6/10 (PC)
IGN	8.8/10 (PS); 7.5/10 (PC)
Next Generation	4/5
Official U.S. PlayStation Magazine	4.5/5
PC Accelerator	9/10
PC Gamer (US)	82%

High Stakes received "generally favorable reviews" from critics, according to the review aggregator website Metacritic. Next Generation stated that, while the game is fundamentally similar to its predecessor, it adds enough new features and gameplay modes to attract Need for Speed fans and newcomers. Similarly, IGN remarked that High Stakes refines the series' formula while introducing realistic elements, calling it "a well-rounded package." In a less positive review, Computer and Video Games editor Ed Lomas felt that there were better racing games for the PlayStation, but acknowledged that the game still has a charm that can appeal to racing enthusiasts. The game was occasionally compared to Gran Turismo because it features more realistic gameplay than it predecessor.

Graphically, High Stakes was praised for its detailed cars, believable scenery, lens flare effects, and real-time lighting. A course set in Canada has a train running alongside the road, which IGN cited as an illustration of the game's attention to detail. The music and sound received similar praise. In particular, IGN enjoyed the house and techno music that is played during the menu, while GameSpot editor Jeff Gerstmann remarked that the language of the police chatter is in the native tongue of the race location. The game's inconsistent frame rate was frequently criticized. Writing for Official U.S. PlayStation Magazine, editor Kraig Kujawa observed that the issue can be severe in the Hot Pursuit mode, but considered it a minor issue because his experience with the rest of the game was smoother.

Critics praised the controls and physics engine for providing the right balance between realistic handling and arcade action. Game Informer felt that the economy-based tournaments add a new strategic element to the game. GameRevolution editor Sean Johnson highlighted the game's artificial intelligence, stating that computer-controlled opponents swerve in the player's direction if the player attempts to overtake them. He said that this feature encourages players to develop maneuvering strategies between opponents, making races more exciting. The Hot Pursuit mode where one player controls a racer while another tries to catch them as a police pursuit was criticized for being unbalanced. Gerstmann explained that the pursuit player is in disadvantage because they cannot call for assistance, resulting in a chicken game where the racer player only has to stay away from the pursuit player until time runs out.

Critical reception for the Microsoft Windows version was generally very positive. PC Gamer credited the Career mode for expanding the game's longevity and its economy-based system for adding a lot of depth. The magazine also praised the game's Glide and Direct3D-powered graphics, noting their reflective environmental mapping. PC Accelerator stated similar pros, calling High Stakes "the best racing game out there" at the time. Some critics found that the controls were confusing or not optimized for keyboard play. Computer Games Strategy Plus remarked that cars tend to understeer and, although the game includes an option to tune steering response, it cannot be used in the Career mode. Other minor criticisms were the game's relatively demanding graphics, unforgiving Career mode, and the fact that the gameplay feels very similar to that of its predecessor. According to GameSpot, High Stakes "doesn't feel like a sequel, even though it is a very good game on its own."

In the German market, the PlayStation version received a Gold award from the Verband der Unterhaltungssoftware Deutschland (VUD) by the end of July 1999, indicating sales of at least 100,000 units across Germany, Austria and Switzerland. The Microsoft Windows version won in the Racing category at the 1999 CNET Gamecenter Awards and was awarded Racing Game of the Year at the 2000 Premier Awards by Computer Gaming World. The game was a runner-up for Racing Game of the Year at the 2000 Computer Games Awards by Computer Games Strategy Plus, but lost to Dirt Track Racing. At the Best & Worst of 1999 Awards by GameSpot, High Stakes was nominated for Driving Game of the Year, losing to NASCAR Racing 3. Similarly, at the Game of the Year 1999 Awards by PC PowerPlay, the game was a runner-up in the Best Driving/Racing category, but lost to Grand Theft Auto 2.
