= Need for Speed: Hot Pursuit (2010 video game) =

Racing video game

- Cover art featuring a Pagani Zonda Cinque (top) and Lamborghini Reventón (bottom)
- Developer: Criterion Games (Note: Additional work by EA DICE. Exient Entertainment developed the Wii version. Stellar Entertainment developed the Remastered version.)
- Publisher: Electronic Arts
- Directors: Alex Ward; Craig Sullivan; Fiona Sperry
- Producers: Alan McDairmant; Hamish Young; Matt Webster
- Artists: Henry LaBounta; Yuta Nakamura
- Composers: Marios Takoushis; Vanesa Lorena Tate
- Series: Need for Speed
- Platforms: Windows; PlayStation 3; Wii; Xbox 360; iOS; Android; webOS; Windows Phone; Java ME; Remastered; Windows; PlayStation 4; Xbox One; Nintendo Switch
- Release: NA: 16 November 2010; AU: 18 November 2010; EU: 19 November 2010; Remastered; Windows, PS4, XONE; WW: 6 November 2020; Switch; WW: 13 November 2020
- Genre: Racing
- Modes: Single-player; multiplayer

Need for Speed: Hot Pursuit is a 2010 racing video game developed by Criterion Games and published by Electronic Arts for PlayStation 3, Xbox 360, Windows, with separate versions developed by Exient Entertainment for the Wii and by Firemint for iOS, Android, webOS, and Windows Phone. Hot Pursuit is the sixteenth Need for Speed title and was released first in November 2010, and digitally in December. It serves as both a reboot of the series and a revival of the Hot Pursuit name last used in Need for Speed: Hot Pursuit 2 (2002).

Hot Pursuit is set in the fictional Seacrest County, which is based on the American states of California, Oregon and Washington, in which players can compete in several types of races. Players can compete online, which includes additional game modes such as "Interceptor", "Race", and the titular "Hot Pursuit". The game features a new social interaction system called "Autolog", which is a network that connects friends for head-to-head races and compares player statistics for competition. The game also features paid downloadable content in the form of new vehicles, events, and achievements.

Hot Pursuit was first revealed at E3 in July 2010, and released on 16 November of that year. Hot Pursuit was well received by critics and was the recipient of numerous accolades: it was awarded with "Best Racing Game" from the 2010 Game Critics Awards, and also won several similar awards at other outlets, including Best Driving Game at the Spike 2010 Video Game Awards and a BAFTA Award for its Autolog multiplayer component.

A direct successor to Hot Pursuit, Need for Speed: Most Wanted, was released on 30 October 2012. A remastered version, titled Need for Speed: Hot Pursuit Remastered, was released on 6 November 2020 for Windows, PlayStation 4 and Xbox One, and on 13 November 2020 for Nintendo Switch.

== Gameplay ==
=== PS3, Xbox 360, Microsoft Windows ===
Hot Pursuit allows players to control police vehicles and participate in high-speed pursuits, a feature absent from the series since 2002.

Hot Pursuit returns to the gameplay of earlier Need for Speed titles, mainly Need for Speed III: Hot Pursuit (1998), and prominently featuring supercars and high-speed police chases. It features two factions, "Racer" and "Cop", and a full career mode for both roles. Police are more powerful and race faster, with each side having access to several power-ups, including calling for roadblocks and radar jamming. Hot Pursuit's physics are positioned between the arcade-styled approach of Burnout Paradise (2008) and sim racing games such as Need for Speed: Shift (2009).

Hot Pursuit takes place in the fictional Seacrest County based on the West Coast of the Western United States. It is an open world and features over 100 miles (160 km) of open road, four times larger than that of Burnout Paradise, Criterion's previous title. Hot Pursuit features a new social interaction system called "Autolog" which is described as "Facebook for the game". The game features both single-player and multiplayer game modes with up to eight players; as an option to live multiplayer racing, players can post records and achievements on the Autolog feed for friends to see, which they then can try to beat. Autolog also contains an experience system called "Bounty" which is used to unlock new vehicles.

All vehicles in Hot Pursuit are licensed real-world cars, with most available in both racer and police variants, but a few cars are exclusive to each side. The Porsche 918 Spyder, then a concept car, debuts in Hot Pursuit. Ferrari vehicles however, last seen in downloadable content for Need for Speed: Shift and absent from all other entries since Need for Speed: Hot Pursuit 2 (2002), are also absent from Hot Pursuit. There is no car customization or tuning, other than color changing. Unlike previous Need for Speed games which use unbranded, fictional models, real cars like the Audi A4, Chevrolet Cobalt, Porsche Cayenne, Nissan Frontier, and Ram 1500 are used as traffic cars.

=== Wii ===
The Wii version of Need for Speed: Hot Pursuit has very little in common with versions on other platforms. This version was designed by a different company (Exient Entertainment), and was a completely different game in nearly every virtual aspect: graphics, soundtrack, racing modes, gameplay, and customization. Some reviewers cited that the Wii version showed stark similarities to a previous Need for Speed installment, Nitro. This version takes place in four real-life cities across the world, as opposed to the fictional Seacrest County in the other versions. The four cities, each set in a different time of day — Chongqing, China, set in the morning; Dubai, UAE, set in the afternoon; Rio de Janeiro, Rio de Janeiro, Brazil, set in the early evening; and Las Vegas, Nevada, USA, which is set in the late evening.

In Career mode, there are 4 super-tournaments (each city) and a Grand Prix Tournament. Each super-tournament consists of four smaller tournaments, which consist of Hot Pursuit (circuit race with cops), Eliminator (knockout), Time Marker (solo timed circuit run) and Rush Hour (100 to 1) races. Each super tournament concludes with a Boss Race, which is a free roam race (with GPS) to capture more of the checkpoint flags than the Boss (2 out of 3, etc.). Besides Career, the game offers Quick Race mode, which allows up to four players on split screens, each with their own map, and the four race types from Career plus a fifth, "Interceptor" (be a cop & bust a speeder).

The cars, purchased with Bounty, improve in speed, acceleration, and strength (D, C, B, A, and S Class cars, plus police vehicles in the Quick Race's "Interceptor" race). Racers do not have names, just the Career/Profile names. During the race, players can accumulate and use regular nitro and super nitro (more powerful but shorter), similar to Need for Speed: Nitro. Power-ups/"Supes" are acquired while driving: Boost (extra nitro), Drain (others' nitro), Cruise Control (brief auto-steering), Deflect The Heat (send police after opponents), Jammer (invisibility to police), Tank (resistance to crash damage), Soundwave (circular explosion), and Repair (immediate car restoration). Repair is the most important, as players' car must be in a good condition to accumulate Nitro and be immune from being busted by the cops.

A complex yet extensive range of visual customization options is available, including body kits, wheels, and a full range of colors & vinyls, including freehand drawing ability. The most obvious difference is that the graphics and racing physics in this version are completely different from the other versions, giving it a retro look and feel reminiscent of much older pre-GameCube or Mario Kart type games.

== Development ==
Development of Need for Speed: Hot Pursuit began in 2008. It was first hinted at during E3 2009 by EA's CEO, John Riccitiello. Riccitiello stated that Criterion Games, developers of EA's own Burnout series, was working on a "revolutionary" addition to the Need for Speed franchise, stating: "We don't have a plan right now for a separate major launch on Burnout, because the team doing it is working on a revolutionary take on Need for Speed." The title was confirmed to be in development by EA's chief operating officer, John Pleasants, at a Stock meeting in June 2009, where he stated: "We've taken the Burnout team and combined it with our Need for Speed franchise. So we now have that in our favor because that Burnout team is probably one of the more online-centric and notably high-quality game developers that we have out at Criterion." Shift producer, Jesse Abney, expressed his delight to work with Criterion Games, stating that it would be a "great team to work with on that stuff," referencing the development of Need for Speed. It was reported that the game was scheduled for release in Q4 2010. EA's COO, John Schappert, said that the Q4 NFS title was, "a new action based Need for Speed from our Criterion Studio," in a post-financial report conference call. The title was officially revealed as Need for Speed: Hot Pursuit at EA's Media Briefing during E3 2010, with a trailer which showed a high-speed police chase involving three different racers. The trailer was followed by a live demo of the game on stage between creative director Craig Sullivan as a cop and producer Matt Webster as a racer.

In August 2010, before Need for Speed: Hot Pursuit was set to be shown at EA's press conference during Gamescom, it was announced by art director Henry LaBounta that Criterion collaborated with Battlefield creators EA Digital Illusions CE (DICE) in building the expansive open world of Hot Pursuit. Early in November 2010, Patrick Söderlund, Senior Vice President of EA Games Europe, said this of the collaboration: "I think the most important thing, when you have two high-quality developers working together, for it to work, they need to have mutual respect. They need to have that respect, to say 'OK, we trust you to do this.' This was a case where that was so obvious, where the Criterion team had a full trust in the DICE team to do what they were doing, and vice versa."

Recent games in the Need for Speed franchise included a story, but Matt Webster, producer of Hot Pursuit, said: "We didn't really think it was necessary to include a story. If you're a cop, the aim is to go up the ranks, while a racer's aim is to get to the highest rank they can." EA stated that the combination of acclaimed developer Criterion Games, a socially-focused online mode and official car licences makes the franchise more accessible than before. UK product manager for Need for Speed Kevin Flynn said: "This is definitely the best Need for Speed I've seen to date. I thought Shift was a great game but different and a bit serious, while Hot Pursuit is more fun and accessible."

In regard to the game's title being shared with Need for Speed III: Hot Pursuit, creative director Craig Sullivan stated: "To be honest when we started out making the game we didn't know it was going to be called Need for Speed: Hot Pursuit, we just didn't. We got to the game before we got to the name. We realized we were making something that had a lot of cops in it and was really interesting to us, so we thought what can we call this? Eventually we thought this actually fits quite well with Hot Pursuit and went with it."

"Criterion's a AAA developer of action-racing games, with many years of doing great designs, great innovations, and platform technologies – especially for PlayStation 3 and online connectivity. And they kind of just waited patiently for their turn to get the keys to develop their favorite Need for Speed – and revive Hot Pursuit. Hot Pursuit really is a milestone in the Need for Speed ethos of 'grab an exotic car, pick an exotic location, and hit the pavement'. And that really is a core tenet of Criterion's expertise. It was really their interest and their call to revive Hot Pursuit."

— Jesse Abney, producer of Need for Speed: Shift

== Soundtrack ==
Hot Pursuit features 7.1 channel surround sound in PCM (Dolby Digital and DTS are also available). The soundtrack of Hot Pursuit features a general track list as is seen in EA Black Box Need for Speed games such as Most Wanted, Carbon and Undercover rather than a scored soundtrack as seen in ProStreet and Shift. The song "Edge of the Earth" by Thirty Seconds to Mars serves as the game's theme song; other songs in the game's soundtrack include "Big Weekend" by Lemonade, "Cinema" by Benny Benassi (feat. Gary Go), "Opposite of Adults" by Chiddy Bang, "Sofi Needs a Ladder" by Deadmau5, "Watercolour" by Pendulum and "Born Free" by M.I.A.. Hot Pursuit also contains an original score composed by Marios Takoushis and Vanesa Lorena Tate, which is usually played during police pursuit events.

Players can also add custom soundtracks to the game, so that any music stored on the player's hard drive can be selected during gameplay, as long as they are added to a playlist via the console's system menu. As well as optionally using songs from the player's hard drive, several categories of licensed music are available for the game's racing, menu screens, and the photo mode.

== Updates and expansions ==
EA announced the One Million Challenge on 25 November 2010. The idea behind the challenge was that if the Need for Speed: Hot Pursuit launch trailer received one million views on YouTube by 12 December 2010, a free downloadable content (DLC) pack would be released with three new cars. Although the trailer fell short of the million views, EA still awarded the three cars for free. EA stated the cars would be added to the game through a future title update on the PlayStation 3 and Xbox 360; PC users were told that EA will share more news when it becomes available. On 14 December 2010 the first update was released which added the three cars to the player's garage. Criterion released another Xbox 360 title update the following day. On 17 December 2010, a third title update was released which repaired issues experienced with earlier versions of the update. Criterion released the official second update for the consoles on 15 February 2011, addressing some minor issues and glitches.

Criterion also promised updates to add new features in addition to bug fixes for the PC version. The first update for the PC was released on 26 November 2010 which addressed crashes, issues with aspect ratios, and missing effects. D-Box motion chair support was also added. The second update for the PC was released on 19 January 2011, which fixed issues with flickering graphics, controller configurations, steering response, player car engine audio volume, CPU performance and a rare crash issue when entering the Career map screen. The three free cars from the One Million Challenge were also added. The third update for the PC was released on 17 March 2011, which fixed several issues players were having relating to game crashes and bugs. The fourth update for PC was released on 4 April 2011, which fixed another 30 percent of the game's known bugs, with a total of 77 percent of the issues fixed. The fifth update for PC was released on 14 April 2011, as with the most recent patch this new update mainly dealt with various game crash issues which players encountered while playing the game. One game crash in particular, which occurred on some systems when players were prompted to "Press Any Key", was fixed in this patch. EA announced that the PC version of the game would not receive downloadable content. Criterion confirmed this on their official message boards; "We have a limited amount of resources that makes it so that we are unable to deliver new content to all platforms, however we do have more updates and content on the way for PC players." In 2012, the Web Dashboard for Autolog was shut down for all games, except Need for Speed: Most Wanted.

=== Downloadable content ===
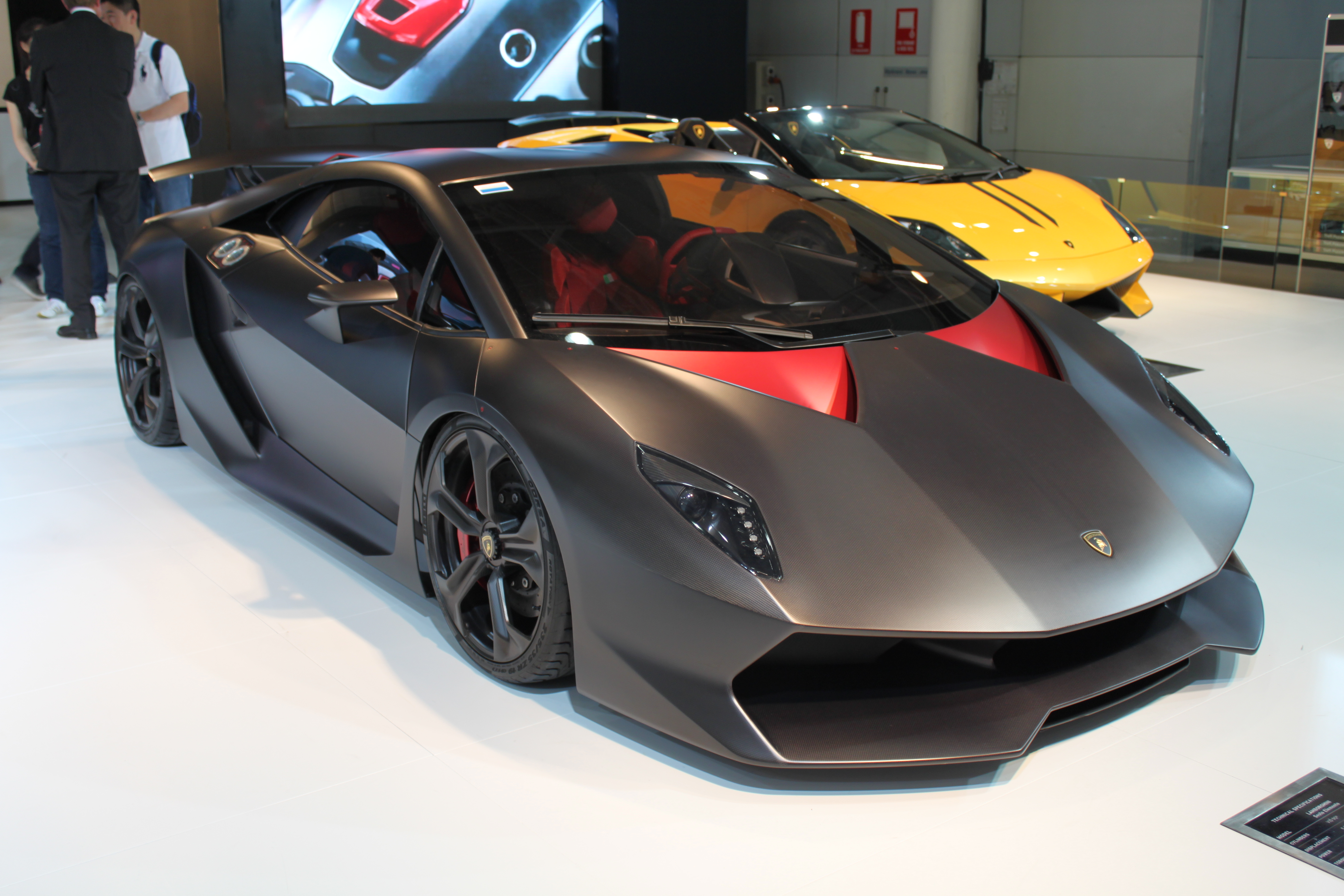
The Lamborghini Sesto Elemento (pictured) is one of the cars offered as downloadable content in Need for Speed: Hot Pursuit.

In addition to the free update, Criterion released several optional, premium packs that add content like new cars and events. The first two DLC packs for Hot Pursuit were released one week after the game's launch. Dubbed Racer Timesaver Pack and SCPD Timesaver Pack, either pack grants the player immediate access to every car in the game on each respective faction. Buying the Racer Timesaver Pack, for example, gives the player access to all Racer cars, and vice versa for the SCPD. The third pack for Hot Pursuit was released one week after the first two. The SCPD Rebels Pack, adds seven new cars previously available only in police variants to the Racer line-up, including the Audi R8 5.2 FSI and Aston Martin DBS.

EA announced the first official DLC for Hot Pursuit on 6 December 2010. The Super Sports Pack adds three new cars; the Porsche 911 GT2 RS, Gumpert Apollo S, and Bugatti Veyron 16.4 Super Sport in variants for both sides of the law. There are also 13 new race and pursuit events, and new achievements/trophies to earn. It was released on 21 December on the Xbox 360 and PlayStation 3 in North America and on 22 December on PlayStation Network in Europe. Although this is the first official DLC, extra additional content could also be purchased via online storefronts.

Criterion announced three new DLC packs for Hot Pursuit on 17 February 2011. Armed and Dangerous brings two new online game modes. 'Most Wanted' has the cops in pursuit of a single racer in an open world, with the other racers fighting to protect him. 'Arms Race' is free-for-all racing that sees weapons enabled. In addition, this pack also contains three new achievements/trophies. It was available from 22 February on PlayStation Network and Xbox Live Marketplace.

The second pack, Lamborghini Untamed, adds the Lamborghini Diablo SV (the cover car of Need for Speed III: Hot Pursuit), Lamborghini Countach LP5000 QV and Lamborghini Sesto Elemento, while the third pack, Porsche Unleashed (named after the series' fifth installment), adds the Porsche 911 Turbo (1982 model), Porsche 959 and Porsche 997 Speedster. All mentioned cars are in both cops and racer variations, and both packs bring ten new events and four new achievements/trophies. The Lamborghini Untamed pack was available from 1 March and Porsche Unleashed pack from 8 March on PlayStation Network and Xbox Live Marketplace. In addition, a bundle pack consisting of Porsche Unleashed, Lamborghini Untamed, and Armed and Dangerous called the Three for All Bundle was released on 22 March only on the PlayStation Store.

=== EA Crew Edition ===
A limited edition of the PC game was released to EA employees during December 2010. The EA Crew Edition includes seven bonus racer cars; Mercedes-Benz SLR McLaren 722 Edition, Maserati Quattroporte Sport GT S, Chevrolet Corvette Z06, Lamborghini Reventon, Bugatti Veyron 16.4, Aston Martin DBS, and Audi R8 5.2 FSI (these vehicles were later released in the SCPD Rebels Pack). The box is not labeled for retail sale and the disc is marked as "not for resale".

=== Remastered edition ===
A remastered edition of Hot Pursuit, titled Need for Speed: Hot Pursuit Remastered, was released for Windows, PlayStation 4 and Xbox One on 6 November 2020, and for Nintendo Switch on 13 November 2020, just ahead of the game's tenth anniversary. It is the first installment in the Need for Speed series to receive a remaster, and is based on the PS3, Xbox 360 and PC versions of the original release. In addition to updated visuals and support for newer hardware, the game includes cross-platform play support for multiplayer. It also includes all former main DLC, with the career events of the Super Sports Pack, Lamborghini Untamed, and Porsche Unleashed integrated into the main career rather than being separately playable from it. It also adds the ability to change the colour of most Racer vehicles and—via an update released in February 2021—add custom wraps to such vehicles. Three vehicles that were in the original game, the 722 Edition and Stirling Moss models of the Mercedes-Benz SLR McLaren, and the Carbon Motors E7 Concept, are missing. The remastered version was developed by Criterion Games and Stellar Entertainment, the latter who also handled the 2018 remaster of Criterion's Burnout Paradise.

== Marketing and release ==
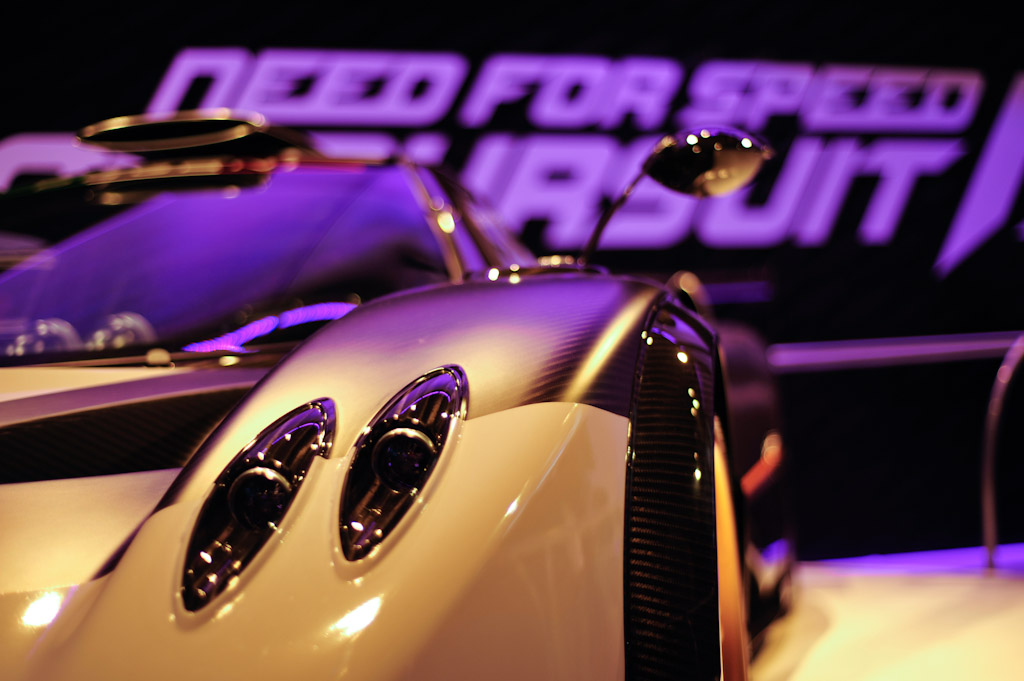
Promotion at E3 2010

In early July 2010 EA announced Need for Speed Hot Pursuit on Tour, a seven-city event that took the game around the United States prior to the game's release. Each stop featured recording artists and showcased an assortment of exotic cars. The tour began on 14 July 2010 at the Manhattan Classic Car Club in New York City, headlined by DJ Z-Trip. It then continued to Chicago, Seattle, San Francisco, Austin and Miami, ending with the Hot Pursuit launch party in Los Angeles. EA received a helping hand from UK vehicle wrapping company Totally Dynamic for the UK launch event, held at Totally Dynamic's South London centre. In addition to the standard edition, a Limited Edition of the game has been released, which was originally only available through pre-order at the same price as the regular game. However, it was still available beside the regular game, but in limited quantities. The Limited Edition features numerous bonuses over the standard edition, including exclusive packaging, two exclusive racers and four unlocked cars.

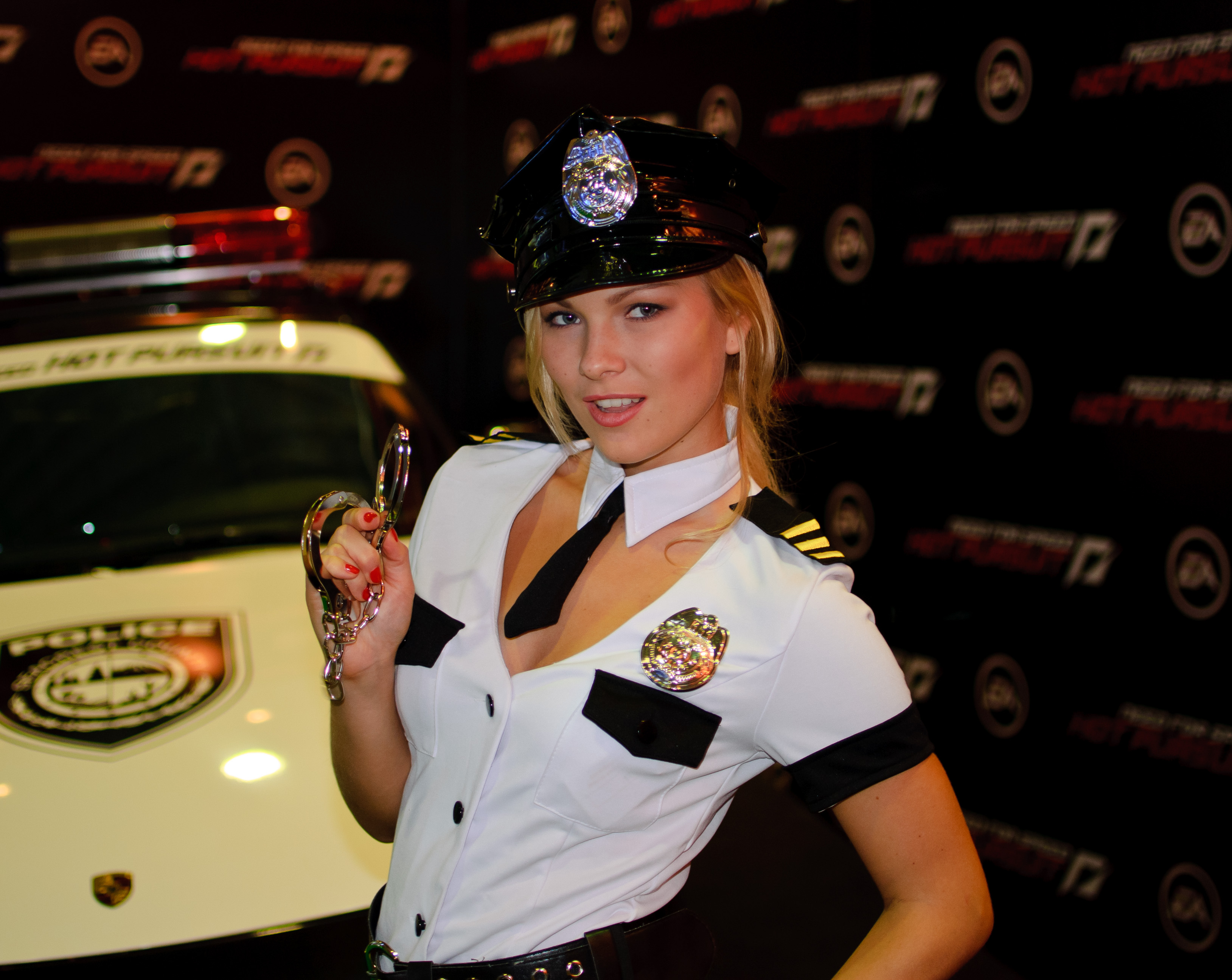
Promotion at IgroMir 2010

The Need for Speed: Hot Pursuit demo was available for download on 26 October on Xbox Live Marketplace worldwide and the PlayStation Network in North America and on 27 October 2010 on the PlayStation Network in Europe. The demo was a limited time demo and closed on 9 November 2010. Criterion Games stated that "Unlike Xbox 360 and PS3 versions, PC demos require comparatively more resources to ensure that they run smoothly across a wide variety of systems," for not getting the chance to release a demo for the PC. The demo was a hit, and was download more than 2 million times, making it the "most popular demo in Need for Speed history".

EA announced on 15 November 2010 the first two Games with Developer, both on the first weekend after the game launched. The event allowed the players to test their newly developed skills against those who had a hand in creating the game. EA announced on 26 November 2010 an Autolog Recommends Contest. It was a two-week-long competition. If the fans beat any of NFSDrew's Need for Speed: Hot Pursuit Autolog recommended times on Xbox or PS3, it gave one of them the chance to win a custom (NTSC) Need for Speed: Hot Pursuit PlayStation 3, which is an extremely rare Collector's Edition. EA also announced two Autolog Photo Contests, the first ended 26 November 2010 and the second 6 January 2011. The players had to take creative photos, then EA with the community announced the best and creative photo, which win a custom Need for Speed: Hot Pursuit PlayStation 3 Limited Collector's Edition. EA announced the Friday Gaming Sessions, which started on 17 January 2011. EA announced the Need for Speed Autolog iPhone app in late November 2010. The app features the Wall, Dreamshots, Autolog Recommendations, SpeedWall and a Play Later button. The app was released on iTunes on 13 December 2010.

=== Trailers ===
In addition to the trailer shown at the official reveal during E3 2010, several other game trailers have been released, each revealing new aspects of the game. One trailer promoted the Limited Edition of the game, which features additional cars. Some trailers explained the game's new Autolog feature. Two trailers released in September 2010 showcased the different aspects of cops vs racer gameplay. A trailer released on 25 September 2010 promoted the limited-time demo. Three video clips were released on 29 October 2010. Entitled "Fast Needs no Friends", these videos depict two foolish valet parkers, Kevin Dillon and Jerry Ferrara, who have gained a love for fast, exotic cars, by playing Need for Speed: Hot Pursuit. Several trailers were released in November. A trailer was released for indicate Seacrest County, the game's primary locale. A trailer was released for hint that the demo was a success. Two live action trailers was also released to showcase the relationship between the cops and racers. A launch trailer was also released on 16 November 2010. A new video clip was released 15 December 2010, which featured the two foolish valet parkers Kevin Dillon and Jerry Ferrara again. Most of the trailers are now available for free download on Xbox LIVE Marketplace and PlayStation Network.

Four developer diaries were released to promote the game. The first was released on 14 October 2010 which features the game's Producer detailing the Autolog feature. On 28 October 2010 the second developer diary was released that features the game's Creative Director explaining the contents of the recently released demo. The third developer diary, released on 6 November 2010, details the specifics of Seacrest County's terrain and climate, as well as explaining day and night cycles. It was also released two video early in November that featured the game's Designer, he gave some tips on how to succeed in the Dark Horse and Roadsters Reborn events in the demo. If some of the fans beat his record on the Roadsters Reborn event, they had a chance to win some NFSHP prizes. The fourth diary, released 26 November 2010, explains why and how the game's cars were chosen.

== Reception ==
=== Pre-release ===
Need for Speed: Hot Pursuit was well received by critics at E3 2010 and was awarded with "Best Racing Game" from Game Critics Awards as well as several other media outlets. Other games in the category included Forza Motorsport 4, Gran Turismo 5, Test Drive Unlimited 2 and MotorStorm: Apocalypse. IGN stated that it had "an inspired level of connectivity", while 1UP.com claimed that "the other racing games at E3 never had a chance". This was the first game in the Need for Speed series since the original Hot Pursuit to win an E3 award. Hot Pursuit was also nominated for "Best Xbox 360" and "Best PS3" game by IGN, and "Best Graphics" by Gaming Excellence.

=== Post-release ===
Reception

Aggregate score
Aggregator	Score
Metacritic	iOS: 76/100; PC: 86/100; PS3: 89/100; Wii: 50/100; X360: 88/100; Remastered; PC: 75/100; PS4: 75/100; XONE: 77/100; Switch: 74/100

Review scores
Publication	Score
1Up.com	A
Computer and Video Games	9/10
Destructoid	9.5/10
Edge	9/10
Electronic Gaming Monthly	9.0/10
Eurogamer	9/10
G4	4/5
Game Informer	8.75/10
GamePro	4.5/5
GameRevolution	A−
GamesMaster	93%
GameSpot	8.5/10
GameSpy	4.5/5
GamesRadar+	10/10
GameTrailers	9/10
IGN	9/10
Joystiq	5/5
Official U.S. PlayStation Magazine	10/10
Official Xbox Magazine (UK)	9/10
Official Xbox Magazine (US)	7/10
PC Gamer (US)	78%
The Guardian	5/5
VideoGamer.com	8/10

Hot Pursuit was received positively upon release; review-aggregating website Metacritic gave the PlayStation 3 version an aggregate score of 89/100, the Xbox 360 version 88/100, and the PC version 86/100, while the Wii version was met with mixed or average reviews with an aggregate score of 50/100. In the edition of 8 November 2010 of Official U.S. PlayStation Magazine, the first review score was given as 10/10. The reviewer said "It's consistently challenging without feeling difficult. It's immensely rewarding without ever being taxing."

IGN gave the game 9.0 out of 10 and an Editor's Choice Award, praising the game's "pure over-the-top driving entertainment. The cars and environments are gorgeous, the crashes are spectacular, and the new Autolog feature breathes new life into the time-honored tradition of video game competition among friends." Eurogamer gave the game 9 out of 10. Reviewer Tom Bramwell said "It's stuffed with content but rarely for the sake of it, and knowing Criterion it will be handsomely supported for months to come, even though it's already the best pure arcade racing game since Burnout Paradise." GameTrailers also scored the game 9 out of 10. The reviewer stated Hot Pursuit was "excellently crafted, letting you take the world's fastest cars across miles of stunning landscapes. Chases are exhilarating from either perspective, and the autolog feature completely changes how you compete with friends, keeping you hooked until you've wrecked all of their scores." Destructoid gave the game 9.5 out of 10. Reviewer Nick Chester noted that "it delivers a near-perfect competitive experience, in a way that few games - racing or otherwise - can. Hot Pursuit is not only a defining moment for the series, but for arcade-style racing, period." Reviewer Randy Nelson of Joystiq was the second reviewer to give the game a perfect score of 10/10. Reviewer Chris Antista of GamesRadar also gave the game 10 out of 10. Chris stated that "with so many modes and diverse rewards to uncover in Need For Speed: Hot Pursuit, it almost feels like 2.5 games in one package." Electronic Gaming Monthly reviewer Brett Bates gave the game 9.0 out of 10, which felt much the same as GamesRadar's Chris Antista, stating "In effect, you're getting two games in one: What you do as a racer has no bearing on what you do as a cop."

Reviewer Tom Orry of VideoGamer gave the game 8 out of 10, and stated "the core driving is never anything but exhilarating, visually it's almost flawless and the Autolog features are genre leading. There's still something missing, though - a reason to explore the open world." GameSpot awarded the game 8.5 out of ten and said "This fast-paced racer keeps you glued to the TV and on the edge of your seat regardless of which side of the law you're playing on." Official Xbox Magazine gave the Xbox 360 version 7 out of 10, and said "Hot Pursuit feels a little too safe for its subject matter, limited by pedestrian road design that doesn't express all the playfulness that we'd expect in car combat." However, the UK edition of the magazine gave the game a 9 out of 10, and said "It pays respect to the classic NFS games, borrows the best bits from Burnout and is a technical masterpiece. The chase to reclaim NFS's once legendary chart topping form is well and truly on."

PlayStation Lifestyle reviewer Thomas Williams gave the game 9 out of 10 and stated "What Criterion Games has done with Need for Speed: Hot Pursuit is develop the best entry in the series in the last 5 years of release. Once you start playing this game, there is no way you can play just one race." PlayStation Lifestyle writer Mike Hartnett declared Hot Pursuit better than Gran Turismo 5, and concluded with "Need for Speed: Hot Pursuit is just downright more fun than anything rolling out of Polyphony Digital's garage. There is certainly no shortage of epic moments in this game. Whether you're tearing through single-player mode to rank-up as a cop or a racer, throwing down spike strips to take out your friends online, or just relieving a bit of stress by driving around in free-ride mode."

According to Metacritic, the Remastered version received "generally favorable" reviews from critics; the site gave aggregate scores of 74/100 for the Nintendo Switch version, 75/100 each for the PlayStation 4 and Windows versions, and 77/100 for the Xbox One version.

=== Sales ===
"Need for Speed: Hot Pursuit was an immensely successful game. Games in any genre need to offer great gameplay and above all, constantly innovate. By taking those ingredients our racing games have a bright future."

— Dan Holman, EA's marketing director

In the UK, Need for Speed: Hot Pursuit debuted at number three on the UK All Format Gaming Chart on its first week of release, beaten by Activision's Call of Duty: Black Ops and Ubisoft's Assassin's Creed: Brotherhood. The second week was it dropped down to number six. However, the fourth week, Hot Pursuit sales jumped 48 percent, which boosted the game from seventh to third. The sixth week, Hot Pursuit sales were down 67 percent, which slipped down one place to number fourth. The seventh week, Hot Pursuit was placed number ten, but the next week it jumped up to number seven.

In the US, Hot Pursuit was ranked number seven on NPD's sales charts for November 2010, outselling Sony's racing juggernaut Gran Turismo 5, which launched about a week later. On 10 December 2010 GamesIndustry reported that Hot Pursuit managed to sell 417,000 units in the US in just two weeks. Cowan and Company reported that despite the positive sales figures were not enough to pick up EA's year on year sales figures. The analytical firm stated that the year on year sales figures for November were still down 25 percent for EA. Gamertell stated that "Hot Pursuit's success is a big boost for a genre that has taken some hits in 2010, as well as a franchise that has been searching for its identity. After several 'reinventions', EA turned to Criterion Games, the studio famous for the Burnout series, to right this racer. Criterion took the series back to the high-octane formula of cops chasing racers. Unlike actual illegal street racers, Hot Pursuit fans seem happy to see the police." Hot Pursuit was placed number ten on NPD's sales charts for December 2010 with sales of 906,000 units for the month.

On 1 February 2011, on EA's financial result report of Q3 2010 it was mentioned that the game has sold more than 5 million units. "It's on a sharp uptick the last couple of years as we've driven high-quality titles ever higher in the charts, particularly in Europe but also in North America," John Riccitiello, EA CEO, said during the publisher's overnight Q3 earnings call. Wedbush Morgan analyst Michael Pachter commented on the figures, saying that they were slightly over his expectation of 4.5 million units at this point. Hot Pursuit surprised him, then, but not as much as Medal of Honor did. Early in November, analyst Mike Hickey also said he believed EA's Hot Pursuit could sell 4.2 million copies during the 2010 Christmas period.

=== Awards ===
Following the high praise it received at its release, Need for Speed: Hot Pursuit received numerous awards from various magazines, trade shows and gaming websites. The game has won over 30 different awards, including Racing Game of the Year from major publications, more than any other racing game that year.

In 2010, at the E3 2010, Game Critics Awards gave Hot Pursuit the Best Racing Game award. Hot Pursuit was named the Best Driving Game at the 2010 Spike Video Game Awards. Hot Pursuit was awarded Best Racing Game by GameSpot, 1UP, GameSpy, and Shacknews. VGChartz awarded Hot Pursuit the Best Racing Game on Xbox 360, while GameTrailers and Game Revolution nominated Hot Pursuit for Best Racing Game. Hot Pursuit was awarded Best Competitive Multiplayer on Xbox 360 by IGN, as well as a nomination for Most Addictive Game on Xbox 360, while GamesRadar nominated it for Multiplayer That Broke The Mold. Giant Bomb gave Hot Pursuit the Most Improved Franchise award, while Gamereactor awarded Hot Pursuit for the Year's Fastest.

In 2011, at the 14th Annual Interactive Achievement Awards, the Academy of Interactive Arts & Sciences awarded Hot Pursuit with "Racing Game of the Year". At the 7th British Academy Games Awards, Hot Pursuit won the Multiplayer award. At the 2011 Golden Joystick Award, Hot Pursuit was a runner up for Racing Game of the Year. Hot Pursuit was nominated for Favorite Video Game at the 2011 Nickelodeon Kids' Choice Awards, and Best Game at the 2011 BAFTA Kid's Vote Award.
