= Saki Kaskas =

Greek-Canadian video game music composer

Theodosius Kaskamanidis
- Also known as: Saki Kaskas, Captain Ginger
- Born: September 24, 1971; Krefeld, West Germany
- Died: November 11, 2016 (aged 45); Vancouver, Canada
- Genres: Rock, punk rock, heavy metal, folk rock, hardcore punk, jazz fusion, funk rock, skate punk
- Occupation: Video game music composer
- Instrument(s): Acoustic guitar, electric guitar, bass guitar, piano, drums
- Years active: 1996-2016
- Labels: Koyote Records
- Website: www.sakikaskas.com

Theodosius Kaskamanidis (September 24, 1971 – November 11, 2016), better known as Saki Kaskas or "Captain Ginger", was a Greek-Canadian video game music composer, best known for his soundtracks in the Need for Speed series.

== Biography ==
Saki was born in Krefeld, West Germany, in 1971, to Greek parents. Shortly after he was born, the whole family moved to Vancouver, British Columbia, Canada. Saki started to play the guitar when he was 15. He practiced 5 hours a day and in two years he was in his first band, Omnibol. They were a rock band and they gained some notoriety around the Vancouver music scene.

In 1993, Omnibol broke up. At that time, he started to play in various bands. Saki played in a Greek folk band, a heavy metal band, a cover band, a ‘power trio’ rock band and in a guitar duet. He also played sessions for commercials and such.

=== Electronic Arts ===
In 1994, Saki joined The Heavy Lounge. This was an instrumental band and they played progressive rock with some leanings towards Jazz, Funk and Metal. The keyboard player was Jeff van Dyck, who was working for Electronic Arts at the time. In 1996, Jeff got Saki a contract for The Need for Speed. Soon after that, Saki became a full-time composer for EA, and he composed music for NHL 97, NHL 98, Need for Speed II, Need for Speed III: Hot Pursuit, Need for Speed: High Stakes, Need for Speed: Porsche Unleashed, Rugby 2001, Missile Command, and Mass Effect 2.

=== Other projects ===
Together with The Humble Brothers, Saki Kaskas has done session guitar work for remixes for Skinny Puppy, Deftones, Linkin Park, Filter, Dry Cell, Anastacia and Static-X.

In 2012, Saki Kaskas began to record again, composing music on his own behalf, and for newer games such as Sleeping Dogs.

== Death ==
Kaskas died of a fentanyl overdose on November 11, 2016, in his Vancouver apartment; he had been battling heroin addiction for over a decade. A posthumous album he was working on at the time of his death, Theodosius, was released in 2019. It was completed by his friend and former Electronic Arts colleague Jeff Van Dyck, with the help of other former colleagues like Traz Damji and Rom Di Prisco.

== Prominent works ==
- Rome: Total War
- The Need for Speed
- Need for Speed II
- Need for Speed III: Hot Pursuit
- Need for Speed: High Stakes
- NHL 97
- NHL 98
- Missile Command
- Need for Speed: Porsche Unleashed
- Rugby 2001
- SimCity 4
- Mass Effect 2

== Interview ==
EXCLUSIVE interview with Saki Kaskas for Romulus Club - 2014-02-12
