= King Arthur & the Knights of Justice (video game) =

1995 video game

- Developer: Manley & Associates
- Publisher: Enix
- Director: Robert L. Jerauld
- Producers: Khanh Le; Tsuneo Morita; Yasuhiro Fukushima
- Designers: Philip Holt; Michael Breault; Mark Rose
- Programmers: Sam Deasy; Kent Peterson; James Hague
- Artists: Kevin Pun; John Baron; Hans Piwenitzky
- Composer: Robert Ridihalgh
- Platform: Super NES
- Release: NA: May 1995
- Genre: Action-adventure
- Mode: Single-player

King Arthur & the Knights of Justice is an action-adventure game developed by Manley & Associates and published by Enix for the Super Nintendo Entertainment System in May 1995. Based on the cartoon series of the same title, which was loosely inspired by the Arthurian legend, the game was released in North America exclusively.

The player takes on the role of a team of American football players who are transported to medieval England and given the mission to save King Arthur and destroy the evil sorceress Morgana and her army. The game was the first Enix title developed by an American company, and was inspired in-part by The Legend of Zelda. It was received with reviews ranging from mediocre to extremely poor.

== Gameplay ==
The characters' meters are shown at the top of the screen. Here, Arthur and the Knights are at the center and bottom of the screen.

The game is an action-adventure game, played from a top-down perspective. The player takes on the role of Arthur King and is accompanied by two Knights of Justice controlled by the game console. The player battles enemies using a regular sword swing or a special attack, and can block high and low attacks.

Twelve Knights are available from the start (including Arthur King), each with his own weapon, personality and statistics for life force, defense, strength and speed. Each boss of the game has a specific weakness against one of the Knights. Changing party members is done by visiting the Round Table room in Camelot. Each character has a life meter, and Arthur also has a power meter. Various items must be collected to complete quests and objectives, while some can be used to restore a character's life meter.

An overworld map feature allows the player to directly access locations already visited once. The game has no saving feature but allows accessing various points of the storyline with a system of passwords.

== Plot ==
The events of the game are set in a fictional version of Britain in the 5th century. The evil sorceress Morgana has magically imprisoned King Arthur and the Knights of the Round Table in the Cave of Glass beneath her castle, past Hadrian's Wall. At Camelot, the King's wizard Merlin uses a crystal ball and locates a brave team of "warriors" in the future, led by Arthur King and dubbed "The Knights". They are actually American football players, though Merlin interprets their names as a sign of fate. He summons them back in time, and the Lady of the Table transforms them into "Knights of Justice". Merlin asks them to break the seal on King Arthur and the Knights of the Round by gathering the twelve Keys of Truth.

The party retrieves the Excalibur sword from the Lady of the Lake, proving their worth by claiming the Pendragon Shield from a young dragon at Shield Heights. They assist Erek, the deposed ruler of Tintagel Castle, and recover the first Key of Truth in the castle. They make their way into the village of Welton, which is under a mind control spell, and recover the second Key of Truth at Gruesome Keep. After breaking the spell on Welton and crossing the Blinder's Way, they claim the third Key of Truth at Castle Sanguine.

During the event, a Warlord infiltrates Camelot and poisons Squire Everett. The party collects an antidote in the Swamp of Zagar and saves the Squire. They then claim the fourth Key of Truth in Stone Keep. They rescue the son of the Gnome King to obtain the fifth Key of Truth, and collects four Elemental Keys to unlock access to Castle Vilor and the sixth Key of Truth. The party finds the seventh and eighth Keys of Truth in Crownhorn village and the Cape of Death, respectively. The ninth and tenth Keys are found in Blackroot Keep and the Dark Citadel while searching for the missing pieces of the Staff of Rhiothamus, which can break open a path in Hadrian's Wall.

Using the Staff, the party goes past Hadrian's Wall and into the Dark Forest, where the eleventh Key of Truth is found. In a cemetery, they stumble upon a statue of Morgana, which fires a magic beam that kills the two Knights in the party. Arthur travels to the Town of the Dead by himself then to the Plain of the Dead and retrieves his two dead Knights. They reach Morgana's castle, Stone Gardens, and defeat Morgana in her dragon form, (Note: The game's ROM contains unused dialogue line "You have been lucky enough to defeat my dragon, but I'll be back, and I'll have my revenge!" which suggests that Morgana was originally supposed to not turn into but just summon the dragon and then escape after it is killed.) thus obtaining the last Key of Truth. In the game's ending sequence, the party members are congratulated by the real, freed King Arthur, and Merlin uses Stonehenge to send them back to their era.

== Development ==
King Arthur & the Knights of Justice was the first Enix game developed by an American company: Manley & Associates in Issaquah, Washington. Roughly two dozen people worked on the game, though not all at the same time. It was initially planned for a 16-megabit cartridge, but four additional megabits were eventually added to expand the game. Development spanned about two years.

In addition to the original cartoon series, the developers gathered ideas from several sources for inspiration, including The Legend of Zelda action-adventure game series, and books such as T. H. White's The Book of Merlyn and fables from medieval poet Marie de France. They noted that the hardest part of development was coming up with puzzles for each of the regions, as they had to be "fun and challenging, but not repetitive". While they tried to maintain a balance between action and puzzles, they noted that they focused more on the puzzle aspect of the game. Favorite parts of the game for the developers include the dragon battles, the boss Blackwing and Morgana's Warlords.

== Reception ==
Reception

Aggregate score
Aggregator	Score
GameRankings	55% (2 reviews)

Review scores
Publication	Score
Electronic Gaming Monthly	5.6/10
Nintendo Power	2.7/5

The title received generally negative reviews. Freelance critic Robert Schmitz gave the title a score of 0.5 out of 11, calling it "awful" and saying he "hated" it. While Nintendo Power gave the game an eight-page walkthrough, its review score was quite low for its usual scoring standards, writing that the game was largely puzzle-solving, but that the "puzzles" were merely finding hidden items which the game tells you where they are. The four reviewers of Electronic Gaming Monthly were divided. Ed Semrad and Danyon Carpenter said it was "okay", with the strong music, immersive sound effects, and epic quest balanced against the below-average graphics, while Al Manuel and Sushi-X said it was an all-around mediocre clone of Secret of Mana. Both Carpenter and Sushi-X remarked that the game would have a hard time getting noticed due to it being released in the same month as Chrono Trigger. Allan Milligan, in a review for the Gaming Intelligence Agency, judged the graphics and audio both mediocre, the character designs as bad, the plot generic and the puzzles not challenging. He noted that it is impossible for the player to know in advance which Knight is best suited for which boss. Milligan called the game "staggeringly ill-conceived" and likened it to a succession of fetch quests. He criticized the fact that all enemies on a screen must be defeated to progress through some passages, and the possibility for characters and enemies to be hidden from the player's view behind large objects. The Knights' weak artificial intelligence was denounced, as was the lack of animation when a character or enemy is hit.
