= Manley & Associates =

Video game developer

- Industry: Video game industry
- Founded: 1982; 44 years ago
- Founder: Ivan Manley
- Defunct: 2002
- Fate: Merged and folded into EA Vancouver
- Headquarters: Issaquah, Washington (M&A); Bellevue, Washington (EA)
- Products: Video games Edutainment
- Number of employees: 60 (peak estimate)
- Parent: Electronic Arts (1996–2002)

Manley & Associates was an independent software developer, founded in 1982, which developed or converted over 70 video games, multimedia, and educational entertainment titles which were published by other companies, including Electronic Arts, Activision, Disney, GameTek, Publishing International, and Spectrum HoloByte. Many of the company's early games were one or two person projects created in founder Ivan Manley's house, but eventually it grew to roughly 60 people working from an office park in Issaquah, Washington.

In the mid-1990s, Manley & Associates ported some games for Electronic Arts and was subsequently acquired by EA in 1996. Explaining the decision to sell the company to EA, Ivan Manley said that in order to invest in newer technologies, Manley & Associates had to either become a publisher or merge with an established publisher. The studio was relocated to neighboring Bellevue, Washington and renamed Electronic Arts Seattle. EA Seattle closed in 2002 and EA moved half the people to EA Vancouver, the rest were fired.

== Games developed ==
=== As Manley & Associates ===
- Hometown, U.S.A. (1988) (MS-DOS, Mac, Apple II, Apple IIGS, C64, Amiga, FMTowns)
- Pharaoh's Revenge (1988) (Apple II, C64, MS-DOS)
- The Third Courier (1989)
- Xenocide (1990) (MS-DOS), port
- Ninja Gaiden II: The Dark Sword of Chaos (1991) (Amiga, MS-DOS), port
- Are We There Yet? (1991) (MS-DOS)
- Home Alone (1991) (Amiga, MS-DOS)
- An American Tail: The Computer Adventures of Fievel and His Friends (1992) (MS-DOS)
- Paperboy 2 (1992) (Game Gear), port
- Home Alone 2: Lost in New York (1993) (MS-DOS)
- Super Conflict (1993) (SNES)
- The Wizard of Oz (1993) (SNES)
- Pink Goes to Hollywood (1993) (SNES)
- DinoPark Tycoon (1993) (MS-DOS, Mac, 3DO)
- Wolf (1994) (MS-DOS)
- WildSnake (1994) (SNES), designed externally
- King Arthur & the Knights of Justice (1995) (SNES)
- Lion (1995) (MS-DOS)

=== As EA Seattle ===
- Need for Speed II (1997)
- Need for Speed III: Hot Pursuit (1998)
- Need for Speed: High Stakes (1999)
- Championship Bass (2000)
- Motor City Online (2001)
- Matt Hayes' Fishing (2002)
- Need for Speed: Hot Pursuit 2 (2002) (Windows, GameCube, Xbox)
