= Pharaoh's Revenge =

1988 video game

- Developer: Manley & Associates
- Publisher: Publishing International
- Designer: Ivan Manley
- Platforms: Apple II, Commodore 64, MS-DOS
- Release: NA: 1988
- Genre: Puzzle-platform
- Mode: Single-player

Pharaoh's Revenge is a puzzle-platform game developed by Ivan Manley and released by Publishing International in 1988 for the Apple II, Commodore 64, and MS-DOS. The game is similar in style to Lode Runner (1983).

== Gameplay ==
Pharaoh's Revenge is described by Dragon as an arcade action game.

== Reception ==
The game was reviewed in 1989 in Dragon #142 by Hartley, Patricia, and Kirk Lesser in "The Role of Computers" column. The reviewers gave the game 3 1/2 out of 5 stars.
