= The Third Courier =

1989 video game

- Developer: Manley & Associates
- Publisher: Accolade
- Platforms: Amiga, Apple IIGS, Atari ST, MS-DOS
- Release: 1989
- Genre: Adventure

The Third Courier is a video game developed by Manley & Associates and published in 1989 by Accolade for MS-DOS. Versions for the Apple IIGS, Atari ST, and Amiga followed.

== Gameplay ==
The Third Courier is a game set during Cold War Germany.

== Reception ==
ACE (Advanced Computer Entertainment) reviewed the game in their January 1990 issue and called it "a disappointment", and in their July 1990 issue gave it a rating of 65% and commented that "If you think living in an oppressed society is romantic and exciting, you probably deserve to play this game."

Jim Trunzo reviewed The Third Courier in White Wolf #19 (Feb./March, 1990), rating it a 4 out of 5 and stated that "The Third Courier does an excellent job of making you feel like you're a part of the adventure, not just a bystander who's watching the action take place. The game's graphics, terminology, logic and storyline all contribute to the vicarious experience of being an espionage agent."

Dennis Owens reviewed the game for Computer Gaming World and commented that "The Third Courier should have been the sophisticated rock and rolling superspy story that it wants to be (indeed, its fiction is strong and its puzzles are tricky). Instead, its mechanics make it awkward and slow."

Zzap! reviewed the game in their June 1990 issue and gave it a rating of 43% overall, and stated that "If exploring Berlin, talking to drunks and visiting every accessible establishment on every street in an effort to find the odd clue sounds like fun to you, well, I recommend this sleuthing RPG. Otherwise, forget it."

Amiga Action reviewed the game in their July 1990 issue and gave it a rating of 62% overall, describing it as a merely average game.

John Scott for Games International said "I was disappointed - The Third Courier is a different type of game altogether. I expect that this format of game must appeal to some people, since it keeps reappearing in various guises, but it does nothing for me, other than give me an overwhelming urge to go watch some paint dry."
