= Are We There Yet? (video game) =

1991 video game

- Developer(s): Manley & Associates
- Publisher(s): Electronic Arts
- Platform(s): MS-DOS
- Release: 1991
- Genre(s): Puzzle

Are We There Yet? is a 1991 puzzle video game developed by Manley & Associates for IBM PC compatibles and published by Electronic Arts.

== Gameplay ==
Are We There Yet? is a game in which the Mallard family wins a coupon book to tourist traps, and must solve puzzles in each state before they can come home.

== Reception ==
Stanley Trevena reviewed the game for Computer Gaming World, and stated that "Are We There, Yet? is a puzzle bonanza that should be sampled by all conundrum connoisseurs."

== Reviews ==
- ASM (Aktueller Software Markt) - Feb, 1992
- VideoGames & Computer Entertainment
- Aktueller Software Markt
- Game Players PC Entertainment
- Compute!
- Games #108
