= DinoPark Tycoon =

1993 video game

- Developer(s): Manley & Associates
- Publisher(s): MECC
- Designer(s): Chuck Bilow
- Platform(s): MS-DOS, MacOS, 3DO, Windows
- Release: 1993: Mac, MS-DOS; 1994: 3DO; 1997: Windows
- Genre(s): Business simulation
- Mode(s): Single-player

DinoPark Tycoon is an educational business simulation game developed by Manley & Associates and published by MECC in 1993 for MS-DOS and MacOS. Players run a theme park with dinosaurs as its main attraction. The goal of the game is to care for the dinosaurs while keeping the park clean, organized, and well maintained.

A port for the 3DO Interactive Multiplayer was released in 1994 with minor changes.

== Gameplay ==
The objective in DinoPark Tycoon is the successful administration of a dinosaur park. Players start off with a $5,000 loan in the retail version, or a $20,000 loan in the school version. The money is used to pay for the land, dinosaurs, fencing, food and employees necessary to run the park and pay back the loan; failure to meet loan payments results in the park's foreclosure. Once the loan is paid off, players may expand the park and earn profits. If players are confused, an animated dinosaur appears and guides the players through the game.

Main screen (MS-DOS)

Players then visit supply stores to buy the necessary items for park maintenance. The food store provides meat for carnivores, plants for herbivores and seeds for planting. The general store provides fences for the dinosaur pens, with varying degrees of strength and price; concessions such as bathrooms, gift shops and parking lots; and advertising, which is bought per season. The employment office offers the personnel to run the park, and Dino City retails the dinosaurs for the exhibits.

As time passes, players face problems such as escaping dinosaurs, sick employees, and seasonal attendance declines. Players may choose to sell their park. If it has been successful, the player achieves an onscreen award and an entry on the top scores list.

== Release ==
Two versions were released: a retail version and a special school version, which was released to public elementary schools across the United States and Canada. In addition to the retail software, the school version includes background information and classroom activities for teachers. It was not required by the schools' curricula, but was intended to be a fun way for the students to learn basic finance and management skills.

== Reception ==
Writer Larry Blasko of the Associated Press described the game as having realistic similarities to real-life business management, along with skills such as mathematical estimation and "what if?" analysis.

In a COMPUTE! review, David Gerding wrote: "Keeping the staff paid and the dinos fed and healthy is an ongoing task that requires kids to analyze graphs and numbers and make decisions based on their assumptions. The trick is to scratch out enough profit to expand the park with capital improvements and bigger and better dinosaurs".
