= Porsche Challenge =

1997 video game

- Developer: Sony Computer Entertainment Europe
- Publisher: Sony Computer Entertainment
- Platform: PlayStation
- Release: EU: 11 April 1997; NA: 5 August 1997; JP: September 25, 1997
- Genre: Racing
- Modes: Single-player, multiplayer

Porsche Challenge is a 1997 racing video game developed and published by Sony Computer Entertainment for the PlayStation. The player and computer-controlled cars in the game consist of Porsche Boxsters. The game received a mixed critical reception.

== Gameplay ==
One of the tracks on the game is set at Porsche's test track in Stuttgart.

Players choose one of a selection of Porsche Boxsters before a race. Each car has a different driver and each driver has a different personality. The drivers can comment on how other drivers drive and their relationship with the other drivers can affect this as well. Usually they say how bad the other drivers are and how they are better.

There are three types of races for each track:

- Classic - The player races in an arcade-type fashion. No changes to the environment.
- Long - A long race where barriers, shortcuts and numerous other features are changed throughout the race; the player must notice these small changes to ensure their chances of winning races. The changes are made once every lap.
- Interactive - This type of race randomises the track.

The game also features time trial and practice modes.

== Development ==
Development on Porsche Challenge began in 1995 at Sony Computer Entertainment Europe. Sony made a license agreement with Porsche, who allowed the game designers to work with its employees in order to accurately model the Boxster's appearance and performance. Each of the six drivers were individually motion captured to create their own distinctive animations.

As is common in the racing genre, Porsche Challenge was programmed with a "catch-up AI", which causes AI-controlled cars to drive faster and more skillfully when a player car is ahead of them than when they are in the lead.

=== Release ===
Following the game's release in Europe, according to Next Generation it "oddly languished in limbo for months until SCEA decided to pick it up for release in the U.S.", scheduling it for August 1997.

== Reception ==
Reception

Aggregate score
Aggregator	Score
GameRankings	73%

Review scores
Publication	Score
Electronic Gaming Monthly	7/10
Famitsu	28/40
GameRevolution	3.5/5
GameSpot	5.5/10
Next Generation	4/5

Porsche Challenge received an average score of 73% at GameRankings, based on an aggregate of 12 reviews. In August 1998, the game earned a "Platinum" award from the Verband der Unterhaltungssoftware Deutschland (VUD), indicating sales of at least 100,000 units across Germany, Austria and Switzerland.

Though most critics concluded that Porsche Challenge is a competent title which falls far short of greatness, otherwise reactions to the game varied widely and sometimes contradicted each other. For example, while Next Generation, Game Revolution, and Dean Hager of Electronic Gaming Monthly praised the car's handling as indistinguishable from driving a real Porsche boxster, GamePro, Glenn Rubenstein of GameSpot, and Hager's co-reviewer Kraig Kujawa all contended that the realism of the handling makes the racing frustrating and less enjoyable. Where Hager found the characters "goofy" and opined that they should have been gotten rid of, and GamePro said that the selection of characters has no impact on the gameplay, Next Generation, one of the few publications to give Porsche Challenge a positive recommendation, asserted that "The presence of six different drivers, each with a unique driving style, takes care of the problem of having just one kind of car."

Kujawa found that where Porsche Challenge falls short is that it lacks the excitement of top-line racing titles. Rubenstein, in addition to criticizing the unrealistic graphics and weak sense of speed, felt that the game simply fails to distinguish itself among the glut of racing games coming to market, leaving gamers "just as well-off waiting for the next driving game to hit the market, which will most likely be in about a day or two." While contending that the game has outstanding sound effects and "some of the most realistic graphics we’ve seen", Game Revolution also cited a lack of excitement, and added that the small RPM display further keeps the game from having impact. GamePro judged that the game needed more tracks to have true "staying power", though most critics found that the variations in the tracks which open up during play gives the game plenty of longevity.

== See also ==
- The Porsche Legend (1995)
- Need for Speed: Porsche Unleashed (2000)
- Porsche Hall of Legends VR (2020)
- Porsche Virtual Roads (2022)
