= Need for Speed III: Hot Pursuit =

1998 racing video game

- North American Windows cover art featuring a Lamborghini Diablo SV being chased by an unnamed police car
- Developers: EA Canada (PS); EA Seattle (PC)
- Publisher: Electronic Arts
- Producer: Hanno Lemke
- Programmers: Brad Gour (PS); David Lucas (PS); Sam Deasy (PC)
- Artists: Scott Jackson (PS); Peter King (PS); Stefan Schwartz (PC); Steve M. Suhy (PC)
- Writer: Tony Whitney
- Composers: Rom Di Prisco; Saki Kaskas; Matt Ragan; Alistair Hirst; Crispin Hands
- Series: Need for Speed
- Platforms: PlayStation, Microsoft Windows
- Release: PlayStation: NA: March 25, 1998; UK: April 3, 1998; Windows: NA: September 23, 1998; EU: 1998
- Genre: Racing
- Modes: Single-player, multiplayer

Need for Speed III: Hot Pursuit is a 1998 racing video game developed for PlayStation by EA Canada and Microsoft Windows by EA Seattle, and published by Electronic Arts. It is the third major installment in the Need for Speed franchise, incorporating police pursuits as a major part of gameplay. Hot Pursuit remains focused on racing using exotic sports cars, but features races that primarily take place in locations within North America, including varied settings and climates. Police AI is improved over the first game, utilizing several tactics to stop both the player and opponent. The PlayStation version was released on March 25, 1998, while the Windows version was released on September 23, the same year. The game received critical success, with praise for its graphics and customization options. It received a direct sequel in 2002 and a reboot in 2010.

== Gameplay ==
With police pursuits reintegrated into the game, Hot Pursuit's gameplay now consists of two categories. The first encompasses standard racing, as it has been in its predecessors, The Need for Speed and Need for Speed II, in which the player is allowed to race against one (including split-screen races) or seven other racers in normal circuit racers, knockouts, or tournaments (which allow the player to unlock bonus vehicles and a bonus track). The second category is dubbed "Hot Pursuit", where police pursuits are included in races; the mode allows the player to select a standard sports car to race against a single opponent in a police-scattered track. The PC version also contains a role reversal variation in which players select a police version of a sports car to pursue and stop all six racers before they complete the race. Completing the Hot Pursuit challenges in both roles in the PC version on every track of the game unlocks additional police sports cars.

Two modes were introduced in the game. The two-player split-screen mode allows two players to race using the same computer. The "Knockout" mode consists of seven races with eight racers on randomly chosen tracks, in which conditions such as selected difficulty, weather, and so on that the player has chosen before starting the race-series will apply. Each race consists of two laps where the driver who finishes last will be eliminated from the race lineup. All other drivers advance to the next round and carry on with the battle until there is only one player left, who technically wins the knockout competition. The standard "Tournament" mode consists of eight opponents in a four-lap race on randomly selected tracks and choices made by the player as in the knockout mode take effect when the tournament is started. The game supports network play through a serial port, modem, or IPX, and online gaming through TCP/IP protocol. It also allowed spawn installations of itself to be installed on other machines.

Racing tracks range from desert canyons to countryside villages, as well as snow-capped mountain ranges. Most tracks contain one or more secret shortcuts.

Car tuning was also introduced, which allowed any car's handling to be customized by adjusting low or high-end properties for engine tuning and gear ratios, front or back brake balance, slow or fast braking speed, soft or stiff suspension, low or high aerodynamics as well as rain or racing tires. Any of these options could be modified via sliders to offer a digit-sensitive, percentage-based effect to the selected car's overall performance. Higher-end engine and gear tuning, for example, will compromise acceleration for better top speed. Rear-based brake balance and slow braking speeds make for wider, drifting turns, and aerodynamics provide even higher speeds at the loss of handling.

=== Pursuit system ===
The player as a police unit, attempting to arrest racers

Hot Pursuit's pursuit system has been significantly improved in terms of AI and police tactics over The Need for Speed. The game now requires that the racer only stops near a pursuing police car to be ticketed or arrested by the police, as opposed to being overtaken by a police car, forcing the racer to pull over for the same punishments. Accordingly, police cars are now programmed with the ability to block a racer's car in an attempt to halt them. In addition, whereas the original Need for Speed would only have a single police car chasing a racer in each pursuit, Hot Pursuit allows more police cars to pursue a racer, opening up the opportunity for them to collectively ambush the racer's car.

Tactical aspects of the police pursuits have also been improved. The police have the ability to deploy roadblocks which has computer-controlled police cars form a wall across the road, and spike strips which puncture the tires of a racer's car, bringing it to a halt. Both tactics present weaknesses, specifically gaps in the blockade that can be used by a racer to avoid collisions with police cars, or tire punctures from a spike strip which is only deployed on one side of the road. The player may also listen to police radio chatter on the pursuits' statuses, revealing to them the current locations of racers, police cars, as well as roadblocks and spike strips. The radio chatter also reveals reactions to specific events, such as a racer's collision with a parked police car, as well as referencing the racer's passing speed and the occurrence of the race itself ("It looks like the cars are racing!"). Furthermore, if a computer-controlled racer's driving conduct proves to be more dangerous (also chosen by the player) than that of the racer's, the police may relent their pursuit of the player and chase the AI instead.

== Reception ==
Reception

Aggregate scores
Aggregator	Score	
Aggregator	PC	PS
GameRankings	85%	86%
Metacritic	N/A	88/100

Review scores
Publication	Score	
Publication	PC	PS
AllGame	4.5/5	4.5/5
CNET Gamecenter	8/10	8/10
Computer Games Strategy Plus	4.5/5	N/A
Computer Gaming World	5/5	N/A
Edge	N/A	7/10
Electronic Gaming Monthly	N/A	8.125/10
Famitsu	N/A	29/40
Game Informer	N/A	7.75/10
GameFan	N/A	84% (Note: Three critics of GameFan gave the PlayStation version each a score of 87, 85, and 80.)
GameRevolution	A	A−
GameSpot	8.9/10	8.3/10
IGN	7.3/10	8/10
Next Generation	4/5	4/5
PlayStation Official Magazine – UK	N/A	7/10
Official U.S. PlayStation Magazine	N/A	4/5
PC Accelerator	9/10	N/A
PC Gamer (US)	88%	N/A
The Cincinnati Enquirer	3.5/4	N/A

The PlayStation version of Need for Speed III: Hot Pursuit received "favorable" reviews, just two points shy of "universal acclaim", according to the review aggregation website Metacritic. Next Generation called it "an excellent racer for both novice and expert enthusiasts. Hopefully EA will continue to improve the engine so that NFSIV offers a great two-player experience as well." They explained that the game's two-player mode suffers from a severe drop in frame rate. The magazine said of the PC version, "Add the fine 3D-accelerated graphics, lightning-fast response to the controller, incredible weather effects, and impressively valued terrain, and you've got a winner." James Price of Official UK PlayStation Magazine said, "While certainly accomplished, Need for Speed 3 [sic] is hamstrung – in a direct head-to-head with Gran Turismo, EA's title just can't compete. It's a great shame because it's one of the most playable racing games released in the past year."

All four reviewers on Electronic Gaming Monthly hailed Need For Speed III as a strong comeback for the series after the disappointments of Need for Speed II, Need for Speed: V-Rally, and the PlayStation/Saturn revision of the original game, particularly commenting on the outstanding power-sliding and the variety of cars and play modes available. GameSpot likewise said that it was the first truly outstanding game in the Need for Speed series since the original 3DO release, citing its stunning graphical effects and effective customization, and contradicted Next Generation by remarking, "The two-player split-screen mode is one of the best two-player modes I have seen in a driving game." GamePro took a middle ground on the two-player mode, saying that "while the two-player split-screen mode suffers from a little slowdown, it's definitely playable." They criticized the lack of variety in the tracks, noting that some of them are merely palette swaps of others, but lauded the game as one of the best racers on the PlayStation for its graphics, tight simulation, and thrilling Hot Pursuit Mode. (Note: GamePro gave the PlayStation version 5.0/5 for control, 4.5/5 for sound, 4.5/5 for fun factor, and 5.0/5 for graphics.)

AllGame's Shawn Sackenheim said, "All things considered, Need for Speed 3 is a blast! A bit hard at first in the tournaments but the hot pursuit and two player modes will have you racing well into the night for weeks on end." Jonathan Sutyak calling it "a great game because of the ability to play as the police and take part in multiplayer games. Take away those two modes and you have a basic racing game with great graphics." However, Edge said that it "doesn't manage to regain the 'rawness' of the first installment, remaining a fun title that will undoubtedly gain admirers at the expertise of most racing afficionados."

The game was heralded for its customization options, beautiful graphics, and smooth control. Edge praised the design of the game's tracks and challenging police pursuits, but criticized the weightlessness of some cars for "failing to convince the player of any realistic dynamics at work." IGN regarded all the numerous play modes as highly enjoyable, especially the Pursuit Mode, and said the game's impressive graphical effects enhance the experience and atmosphere of the racing.

The game reached number 10 in the UK charts. In the US, the PC version sold 276,000 copies during 1999 alone, at an average of $25. In February 1999, the PC version received a "Gold" sales award from the Verband der Unterhaltungssoftware Deutschland (VUD), indicating sales of at least 100,000 units across Germany, Austria and Switzerland.

The PC version was a finalist for Computer Games Strategy Plus' 1998 "Racing Game of the Year" award, which ultimately went to Motocross Madness. The staff said that the game offers "great looks, and excellent racing action." PC Gamer US likewise nominated the game as the best racing game of 1998, although it lost again to Motocross Madness. They wrote, "For pure arcade rush, it's hard to beat Electronic Arts' thrilling Need for Speed III." Hot Pursuit won "PC Simulation Game of the Year" at AIAS' 2nd Annual Interactive Achievement Awards, "Best Driving" award at Computer Gaming World's 1999 Premier Awards, and "Driving Game of the Year" at GameSpot's Best & Worst of 1998 Awards. It also received nominations for Best Multiplayer Game and Best Racing Game at the 1998 CNET Gamecenter Awards, for "Console Racing Game of the Year" at AIAS' 2nd Annual Interactive Achievement Awards, for "Best Racing Game" at the 1998 OPM Editors' Awards, and for "Best Racing Game of the Year" at IGN's Best of 1998 Awards; all nods were ultimately awarded to StarCraft, Grand Prix Legends, Gran Turismo, and Powerslide, respectively.
