= Need for Speed: Hot Pursuit 2 =

2002 video game

- Cover art with a Lamborghini Murciélago being chased by Ford Crown Victoria
- Developers: EA Black Box (PS2); EA Seattle (Note: EA Canada version ported by EA Seattle) (GameCube, Xbox, Windows); Global VR (arcade)
- Publishers: Electronic Arts; Global VR (arcade)
- Producers: David C. Hooper; Richard Mul; Stefan Q. Wessels
- Designer: William Ho
- Series: Need for Speed
- Platforms: PlayStation 2, GameCube, Xbox, Windows, Arcade
- Release: GameCube, PS2, Xbox: NA: October 1, 2002; AU: October 18, 2002 (GC); AU: October 24, 2002 (PS2, Xbox); EU: October 25, 2002; Windows: NA: October 21, 2002; AU: October 24, 2002; EU: November 8, 2002; Arcade: NA: September 30, 2003; NA: May 18, 2004
- Genre: Racing
- Modes: Single-player, multiplayer

Need for Speed: Hot Pursuit 2 is a 2002 racing video game, the sixth installment in the Need for Speed series following Porsche Unleashed (2000) and the direct sequel to Need for Speed III: Hot Pursuit (1998). It was developed by EA Black Box for the PlayStation 2, and a distinctly different version by EA Seattle for GameCube, Xbox, and Microsoft Windows. Need for Speed: Hot Pursuit 2 features cars from various high-performance and exotic car manufacturers. Players can compete in races using these cars, or opt to play as a police officer and pursue speeders.

The game features several popular recording artists from its time such as Uncle Kracker, The Humble Brothers and Hot Action Cop. Need for Speed: Hot Pursuit 2 received "generally favorable" reviews on the PS2 and Xbox, while the PC and GameCube versions received "mixed or average" reviews, according to review aggregator platform Metacritic. In 2002, the game was awarded Console Racing Game of the Year at the 6th Annual Interactive Achievement Awards.

== Gameplay ==
The player in pursuit of a speeder, having called for backup in the form of an additional police unit (Windows version shown)

Need for Speed: Hot Pursuit 2 is a racing game with an emphasis on evading the police and over-the-top courses featuring lengthy shortcuts. It draws primarily from the gameplay and style of one of its predecessors, Need for Speed III: Hot Pursuit. Two primary game modes are offered: World Racing Championship, in which the player competes against other drivers in a series of races, and Hot Pursuit Ultimate Racer, which adds police to the races. In the latter players must complete the races while also evading capture.

There are several race types in Hot Pursuit 2. Delivery is a timed point-to-point dash, with the police in pursuit. This is similar to the delivery mission in Porsche Unleashed while the police pursuit makes it more challenging. Sprint is a point-to-point race where competitors try to get from one end to the other before their opponent. Time Trial gives players three laps on a level with the goal being to beat the required time to get the gold, silver, or bronze medal. Lap Knockout eliminates the last racer in each lap until one player remains the victor. Knockout follows a similar principle, but eliminations are made to the last racer at the end of each race. Races are usually restricted to a certain class of cars. Faster cars are used near the end of the Championship and Ultimate Racer modes.

The player also has the option to play as a police officer trying to arrest speeders. The player must disable speeders by ramming the speeding vehicle multiple times to disable it, akin to a PIT maneuver. The player must turn on their lights and sirens while in pursuit. As a police officer, the player can call for a barricade, additional units, spike strips, and request help from a helicopter to assist in chasing the target vehicle. At the end of each event, the player is awarded for the number of arrests. In the PlayStation 2 version, this mode is called "You're the Cop" mode while in the Windows, GameCube, and Xbox versions, it is called "Be the Cop".

The game features cars from a variety of manufacturers. One or more cars are available from the following manufacturers: Aston Martin, BMW, Chevrolet, Dodge, Ferrari, Ford, HSV, Jaguar, Lamborghini, Lotus, McLaren, Mercedes-Benz, Opel, Porsche, and Vauxhall Motors. Many vehicles have an unlockable police variant for their respective mode. Hot Pursuit 2 also contains Need for Speed Edition cars, which are upgraded versions of some of the stock vehicles.

Races take place in four environments that differ in atmosphere, each with a few unique courses. The courses in an environment are formed by different roads being connected or separated by roadblocks:

- The Tropical environment, reminiscent of the Oahu and Maui islands of Hawaii, is the most varied environment; the track traverses a city as well as near a volcano, waterfall, beach, rainforest, and two villages
- The Coastal environment, reminiscent of the Central California coast because of its redwood forests, as well as road signs referencing locations from there
- The Mediterranean environment, reminiscent of the Greek coast because of the stadium, a building which resembles Parthenon and architecture that resembles Santorini
- The so-called Alpine environment, which is similar to the Cascade Mountains of Washington, is more homogeneous, with little variation except for the occasional shortcut

The PlayStation 2 version also includes a Desert environment that resembles the Sonoran Desert of Arizona and occasionally has thunderstorms in the North American Monsoon.

The PlayStation 2 version did not feature a career mode. Instead, there is a point system where cars are purchased from winning races. Points are determined by laps led and finishing position. In the Championship and Hot Pursuit trees, extra points are awarded if a medal is won. If the tree is completed, extra bonus races are unlocked. These races include the hardest competitors and the hardest courses. For the multiplayer mode of the Windows version, players can host a game server for LAN or internet-based playing. In addition to this, the GameSpy internet matchmaking system can be used to publish and locate such servers.

== Development ==
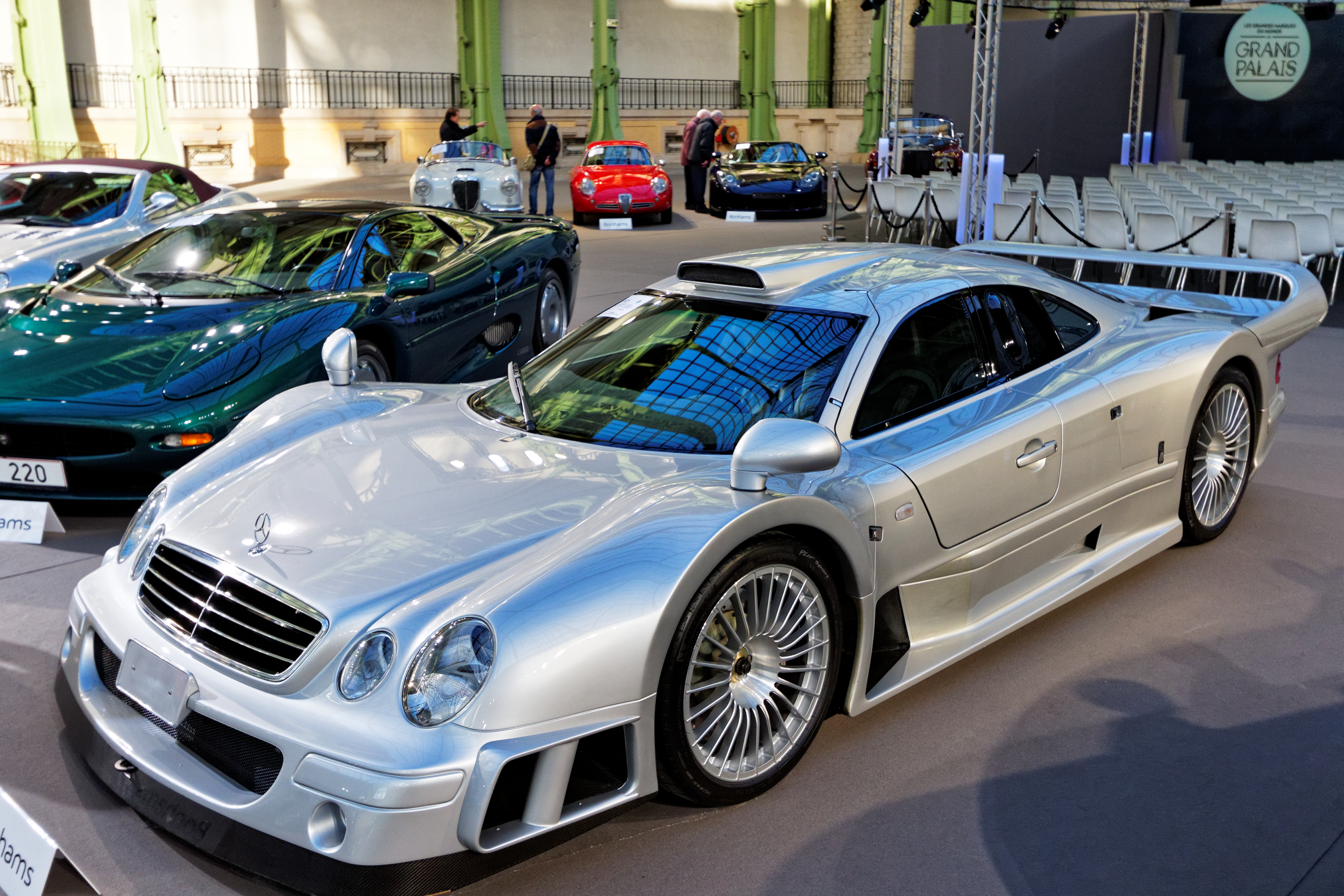
As with other games in the Need for Speed series, Hot Pursuit 2 features real-world cars, including the Mercedes-Benz CLK GTR (pictured).

Different versions of the game were produced for each game platform; the Xbox, GameCube, and Microsoft Windows versions were developed in EA Seattle, a subsidiary of EA Canada, while the PlayStation 2 version was developed by EA Black Box in Vancouver, British Columbia, Canada. The PlayStation 2 was the lead console during development, and due to this several differences exist between it and other versions of the game. (Note: Differences between the PlayStation 2 version of the game and all other versions are described in the Gameplay section.) It was unveiled in October 2001. Hot Pursuit 2 also was present at the Electronic Arts booth during E3 2002.

Many of the cars featured in the game were not available to the world market until close to the game's release. Because of this cars were modeled by mapping photographs to a front, top, and side plane of the art program used. 3D artists then extrapolated the shape from those references. Consultants, such as stunt drivers, were brought in to help the team understand how drivers and vehicles would behave in given situations. This in turn allowed the team to more effectively set up the AI racers. Motion capture was used to animate characters during the arrest sequences. Near the end of development Electronics Arts revealed that only the PlayStation 2 version would receive features such as the desert courses and mirrored tracks, as these were added late in development and there was not enough time for EA Canada to prepare these assets on the other platforms.

In 2003, EA Seattle's version of Hot Pursuit 2 would be ported by Global VR in the series first arcade installment, Need For Speed. Need For Speed: GT, a "supercharged" software upgrade of the game would be released in 2004, which adds 4 cars, faster gameplay, and a mode called Shadow Attack, where players try to beat the time of the best players "shadow".

== Soundtrack ==
Hot Pursuit 2 is the first Need for Speed game to feature licensed rock music, along with techno music composed by contract artists. The game features several popular recording artists from its time such as Uncle Kracker, The Humble Brothers, and Hot Action Cop. The game's soundtrack consists of eight vocal rock songs and seven instrumental rock and electronic songs, all fast-paced with elements of grunge, hip-hop, and rap. The vocal songs are also featured in a second, instrumental version. In the Be the Cop and Hot Pursuit game modes, the instrumental versions replace the vocal ones, which avoids obscuring the police radio messages by the song lyrics. In the PlayStation 2 version, there is the option to change whether or not certain songs are played in normal races, hot pursuit races, the game menus, or if they are not to be played at all. The Xbox version also allows custom soundtracks.

== Reception ==
Reception

Aggregate score
Aggregator	Score			
Aggregator	GameCube	PC	PS2	Xbox
Metacritic	68/100	73/100	89/100	75/100

Review scores
Publication	Score			
Publication	GameCube	PC	PS2	Xbox
AllGame	N/A	N/A	4/5	N/A
Electronic Gaming Monthly	6.5/10	N/A	9.17/10	7/10
Eurogamer	N/A	N/A	8/10	N/A
Game Informer	7.5/10	N/A	8.75/10	8.5/10
GamePro	2.5/5	N/A	5/5	4.5/5
GameRevolution	N/A	N/A	A−	N/A
GameSpot	7.2/10	7.2/10	8.5/10	7.2/10
GameSpy	3/5	3.5/5	4.5/5	3/5
GameZone	7.5/10	7.7/10	8.5/10	7.8/10
IGN	7.3/10	N/A	9/10	7.1/10
Nintendo Power	4.1/5	N/A	N/A	N/A
Official U.S. PlayStation Magazine	N/A	N/A	5/5	N/A
Official Xbox Magazine (US)	N/A	N/A	N/A	7.9/10
PC Gamer (US)	N/A	68%	N/A	N/A
BBC Sport	80%	N/A	N/A	N/A
Maxim	N/A	N/A	5/5	N/A

Need for Speed: Hot Pursuit 2 received "generally favorable" reviews on the PlayStation 2 and Xbox, while the Windows and GameCube versions received "mixed or average" reviews, according to review aggregator website Metacritic. In 2003, the Academy of Interactive Arts & Sciences awarded Hot Pursuit 2 with "Console Racing Game of the Year". It was a runner-up for GameSpot's annual "Best Driving Game on GameCube" award, which went to NASCAR: Dirt to Daytona.

The game received praise during its E3 debut and prior to its release. GameSpot's Jeff Gerstmann noted that "fans of the original Hot Pursuit will likely find a whole lot to like in Hot Pursuit 2 when it ships". David Smith of IGN lauded the return to the police chase action. He stated that Black Box "went right back to the best game in the Need for Speed series (c'mon, it was) and decided to create a sequel to it."

In general, EA Black Box's PlayStation 2 version of Hot Pursuit 2 is considered superior to EA Seattle's version of the game; with GameSpot criticizing the sluggish controls and floaty physics of the PC version.

Maxim gave the PlayStation 2 version a perfect five out of five stars and stated that it "not only gives you the keys to more than 20 exotic cars, it also gives you the unsurpassed joy of leaving traffic cops in the dust." Entertainment Weekly gave the game a B+ and stated, "Killer aerial shots, intense chases, and a rock-infused soundtrack make for a heart-pounding ride." BBC Sport gave the GameCube version a score of 80% and stated that "With plenty of racing challenges it should have a decent amount of longevity but their repetitive nature might grate for some." AllGame also gave the PlayStation 2 version a score of four stars out of five and said that it "offers an impressive amount of arcade-style fun bolstered by the number and variety of courses, challenging Hot Pursuit mode, and excellent lineup of vehicles."

== Legacy ==
A reboot of the Hot Pursuit sub-series, Need for Speed: Hot Pursuit, was developed by Criterion Games, which previously created the Burnout franchise. The game was released in November 2010.
