= Need for Speed II =

1997 racing video game

- Cover art featuring a Ferrari F50
- Developers: EA Canada (PS); EA Seattle (PC)
- Publisher: Electronic Arts
- Producer: Hanno Lemke
- Designers: Scott Blackwood; Hanno Lemke
- Programmers: Laurent Ancessi; David Lucas
- Artists: Scott Jackson; Kent Maclagan
- Writers: Gregg Giles; Richard Mul; Scott Blackwood
- Composers: Saki Kaskas; Jeff van Dyck; Alistair Hirst
- Series: Need for Speed
- Platforms: PlayStation, Microsoft Windows
- Release: PlayStation: NA: March 31, 1997; EU: 1997; Microsoft Windows: NA: April 18, 1997; EU: 1997
- Genre: Racing
- Modes: Single-player, multiplayer

Need for Speed II is a 1997 racing video game released for PlayStation and Microsoft Windows. It is the second installment in the Need for Speed series, a sequel Need for Speed III: Hot Pursuit was released in 1998.

== Gameplay ==
Need for Speed II features country-themed tracks from North America, Europe, Asia and Australia.

Like its predecessor, Need for Speed II allows players to race exotic cars in country-themed tracks from North America, Europe, Asia and Australia, either against computer-controlled opponents or human opponents via a LAN, modem, serial connection, or in split screen. There are three distinct gameplay modes: Single Race mode in which a player simply chooses a car and a course and completes a single race. In this mode, the player can customize both the number and type of opponents as well as the amount of laps to be completed. Tournament Mode in which the player must complete a series of races successfully to unlock a bonus car. The Knockout Mode consists of a series of 2-lap races with eight opponents; the last-place finisher at the end of each race is eliminated from the competition.

The game features eight real-life high-end sports cars and concept cars which the player can drive and race against. The "Special Edition" release of the game added four additional cars. In addition, the game features a "showcase" that provides photos, videos, and technical information about the cars as well as the history of each company and the background of each car's development.

The game also features several new elements compared to the previous game in the form of customizable car paint and components of their car including gear ratios, tires, and spoilers.

== Development ==
Need for Speed II was developed by EA Canada. The lead programmer for the game was Laurent Ancessi with Wei Shoong Teh and Brad Gour as senior programmers.

EA abandoned the Road & Track license used with the original game in favor of licensing with each automobile manufacturer individually. To ensure the physics of fast car handling and performance were as accurate as possible, the programmers collaborated with the manufactures of each vehicle. The sound effects were created by installing microphones in various positions on each car and recording onto eight track digital tape while the car was driven.

A version for the Panasonic M2 was in the works but it was never released due to the cancellation of the system.

== Reception ==
Reception

Aggregate scores
Aggregator	Score
GameRankings	(PS) 71.39% (PC) 68.25%
Metacritic	(PS) 71/100

Review scores
Publication	Score
Computer and Video Games	7.8/10
Electronic Gaming Monthly	(PS) 6.25/10
GameSpot	(PS) 7.3/10 (PC) 7.0/10
IGN	(PS) 6.0/10
Next Generation	(PS) 2/5
PlayStation Official Magazine – UK	(PS) 5/10
Adrenaline Vault	(PC) 4.5/5

Need for Speed II was met with mixed reviews. Aggregating review websites GameRankings and Metacritic gave the PlayStation version 71.39% and 71/100 and the PC version 68.25%. Critics were universally impressed with the selection of expensive cars and the huge number of tracks. (Note: Attributed to multiple references:) However, most found that other issues interfered with enjoyment of the game. IGN, for instance, remarked that "All the right elements are there – cool cars, inventive tracks, decent control – but the execution has been seriously flawed by poor graphics and frame rate." The most commonly cited problem with the graphics was the high amount of pop-in, which Next Generation said "is actually irritating enough to obfuscate what could be a good time." The Official PlayStation Magazine said the game had "atrocious handling" and that it soon got boring. Several critics noted, usually in the form of a complaint, that the game's handling requires players to frequently brake during turns.

There was considerable disagreement over the game's blend of realistic and arcade-style racing. In Electronic Gaming Monthly, Kraig Kujawa and Dean Hager's criticism of the game stemmed from it being easier to play and therefore less realistic than its predecessor. Kujawa added the game "has been given an arcade edge that simply doesn't fit. The cartoony-looking graphics are subpar because they ruin the realistic feel of driving these real, exotic cars." GamePro, however, stated the reverse, that the gameplay was too realistic to appeal to fans of arcade-style racing, and could only be recommended to players who enjoyed games like Formula 1 and the original Need for Speed. GameSpot's Glenn Rubenstein offered a third opinion, saying it provides a unique middle-ground between realism and arcade-style by allowing players to drive real cars with realistic handling into exotic populated areas. He also praised the music and sound effects, and while acknowledging the issues with the graphics, he found them overall impressive, and concluded Need for Speed II to be "the PlayStation's slickest racer yet".

The PC version was slightly less well-received. An issue was that the game required a fast computer at the time, to display the graphics at the highest setting. A reviewer for Computer and Video Games did not appreciate the combination of super realistic cars being driven on fantasy tracks and thought that the crashes "look and feel wrong". Tasos Kaiafas of GameSpot liked the game, but felt most of the roads were "outrageous" and that the cars would be unfamiliar to many. An Adrenaline Vault review described the game as a "good overall driving experience" with easy installation, realistic sound effects and both an excellent interface and music.

A 2007 retrospective review in The Game Goldies praised the crisper graphics, smoother animation, rich colors and increased detail compared to the original.

=== Special Edition ===
Released on October 29, 1997, in the United States and February 2, 1998, in Japan and Europe, the special edition of Need for Speed II includes exclusive "Last Resort" track, three extra cars, three bonus cars, a new driving style called "Wild", and 3dfx Glide hardware acceleration support.
