= Rom Di Prisco =

- Also known as: Morphadron
- Born: August 30, 1972; 54 years ago
- Genres: Electronica, Goa trance, psytrance, breakbeat, big beat
- Occupations: Composer, producer, sound designer
- Instruments: Keyboards, synthesizers, turntables, guitar, bass
- Years active: 1990s–present
- Website: www.romdiprisco.com

Rom Di Prisco (born August 30, 1972), sometimes known as Morphadron, is a Canadian electronic composer. He has provided music for over 30 video games, including the Need for Speed series (second through sixth games), SSX Tricky, the NHL series (2000–2002), Spy Hunter 2, Unreal Tournament 3, Guacamelee!, Fortnite, Foxhole, Rebel Moon Rising, and Anvil Empires.

Di Prisco also produces remixes for other artists, including Christopher Lawrence, Unit:187, 3kStatic, and Count Your Curses. In addition, he also works on music for films and television programs. His music has appeared in film and television including Saw II, The Oprah Winfrey Show, America's Next Top Model, and The Sopranos, among many others.

During an interview with game-ost.com, Di Prisco mentioned some of his influences: Leftfield, Skinny Puppy, The Prodigy, I Start Counting, PWEI, New Order, FSOL, Red Flag, Daft Punk, The Cure, Kraftwerk, Underworld, Thompson Twins, D.A.F., Howard Jones, and Nitzer Ebb.

In December 2010, Di Prisco released his debut solo album, Cryptidalia. The album is currently available as a choose-your-price (including free) download from his website.
