= Need for Speed: Porsche Unleashed =

2000 racing video game

- North American PC box art, featuring the 996-series Porsche 911 Turbo
- Developers: Eden Studios (PS); EA Canada (PC); Pocketeers (GBA)
- Publishers: PlayStation, Windows; Electronic Arts; Game Boy Advance: NA: Destination Software; EU: Zoo Digital Publishing
- Designer: Sylvain Branchu
- Programmers: Bertrand Felicite; Pierre-Arnaud Lambert; Sébastien Tixier; Brad Gour (PC)
- Artists: Jean-Marie Nazaret; Robert Adams (PC)
- Composers: Thomas Colin; Manuel Lauvernier; Saki Kaskas (PC)
- Series: Need for Speed
- Platforms: PlayStation, Microsoft Windows, Game Boy Advance
- Release: PlayStation: NA: March 29, 2000; EU: June 23, 2000; Windows: NA: March 29, 2000; EU: July 21, 2000; Game Boy Advance: NA: March 15, 2004; EU: March 26, 2004
- Genre: Racing
- Modes: Single-player, multiplayer

Need for Speed: Porsche Unleashed (released as Need for Speed: Porsche 2000 in Europe and Need for Speed: Porsche in Latin America and Germany) is a 2000 racing video game published by Electronic Arts for PlayStation and Microsoft Windows. It is the fifth installment in the Need for Speed series. Unlike other NFS titles, Porsche Unleashed centers on racing Porsche sports cars, with models ranging from years 1950 to 2000.

The game is generally considered the final "classic" Need for Speed title before EA Black Box took over development for mainline entries in the series for many years (beginning with the PS2 version of Need for Speed: Hot Pursuit 2). The game also marked the beginning of a 16-year exclusive licensing agreement between Porsche and EA that began in 2000 and ended in 2016 that prohibited most other developers from featuring Porsche cars in other video games without receiving a sub-license from EA. As a result of the licensing deal, many games used RUF and Gemballa models as a loophole in place of Porsche to circumvent Porsche's licensing, as Ruf is considered by the German government to be a full-fledged manufacturer; as such, Ruf models have unique VINs.

== Gameplay ==
A screenshot of the game (Windows version), depicting the exclusive use of Porsche cars on a track set on Corsica. The car displayed is a 930, in front of it is a factory mode 911 Carrera RS 2.7.

Need for Speed: Porsche Unleashed gives the player the opportunity to race Porsche cars (including 3 race cars) throughout a range of tracks located in Europe. There are two career modes, an evolution mode, where the player starts with Porsche cars made in 1950 with the first 356 and ends with Porsche cars made in 2000 with the 996 and factory driver mode, where the player goes through a series of events like slalom, stunts, and races, using Porsche cars preselected for each event. The player can customize their cars drawing from an in-depth catalog of different Porsche as well as aftermarket parts. Unlike previous games in the series, there are no pursuit modes in the Windows version. Some factory driver events include police cars, but the police cars only attempt to impede the players car during certain sprint events. In the PlayStation version, there is an exclusive chase mode where the player has to outrun a pursuing police car until a timer runs out. In splitscreen multiplayer, a second player can take control of the police car and attempt to catch the other player.

The factory driver mode introduces the first storyline in the Need For Speed series. The player's goal is to become a Porsche factory driver by completing a series of events. The game uses pop-up windows, each with an image of an existing Porsche factory team member, and text describing the next event, and also commenting on the player's progress. In some cases, a timed course such as a slalom notes the required time to pass, but also mentions the current team record, where beating the record is optional and the post event pop-up will note if the player set a new record or not. The events involve stunts, like doing two 180 degree spins (the first one leaves the players car driving backwards for a bit), slalom courses, delivery (time limited sprints with police that interfere with the player's car), normal sprint and circuit races.

== Release ==
=== Need for Speed: Top Speed ===
An additional online-only conversion of Porsche Unleashed, dubbed Need for Speed: Top Speed, was released in response to both the release of MacGillivray Freeman's 2002 IMAX film, Top Speed, and the Porsche Cayenne. The game features three existing tracks from Porsche Unleashed and three Porsche vehicles: the 911 (996) Turbo, the 959 and the Cayenne Turbo.

Access to Need for Speed: Top Speed was bundled alongside the PC version of Need for Speed: Hot Pursuit 2.

=== 40 Jahre 911 Bundle ===
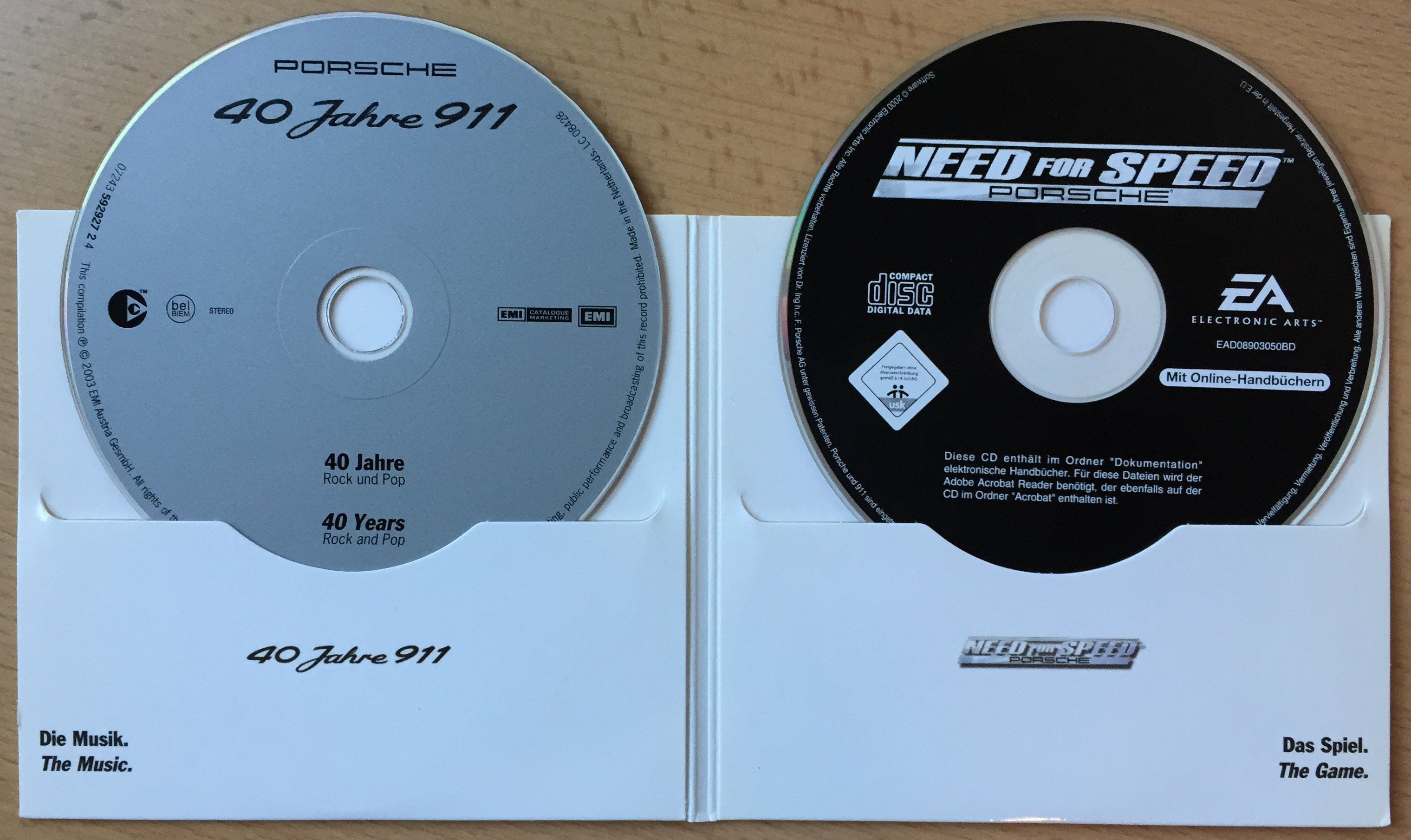
The 40 Jahre 911 game CD alongside a regular CD

The 40 Jahre 911 Bundle was released on November 13, 2003 and was only available in Germany. It was a special 40th anniversary edition for the Porsche 911.

The CD box is packed in a unique metal box with the game itself patched to version 3.4. Also included is the official soundtrack of the game, although no additional game features were included.

== Reception ==
Reception

Aggregate scores
Aggregator	Score		
Aggregator	GBA	PC	PS
GameRankings	59%	84%	75%
Metacritic	62/100	N/A	78/100

Review scores
Publication	Score		
Publication	GBA	PC	PS
AllGame	N/A	3/5	3/5
CNET Gamecenter	N/A	9/10	6/10
Computer Games Strategy Plus	N/A	4.5/5	N/A
Computer Gaming World	N/A	4.5/5	N/A
Electronic Gaming Monthly	N/A	N/A	7.5/10 (Note: In Electronic Gaming Monthly's review of the PlayStation version, one critic gave it 8.5/10, and the rest gave it each a score of 7/10.)
Game Informer	N/A	N/A	7.75/10
GameRevolution	N/A	N/A	D
GameSpot	N/A	8.9/10	5.9/10
GameSpy	N/A	89%	N/A
IGN	6/10	7.9/10	8.3/10
Next Generation	N/A	3/5	N/A
Nintendo Power	3.4/5	N/A	N/A
Official U.S. PlayStation Magazine	N/A	N/A	3.5/5
PC Gamer (US)	N/A	94%	N/A

The PlayStation version received "generally favorable reviews", while the Game Boy Advance version received "mixed" reviews, according to the review aggregation website Metacritic. Doug Trueman of NextGen gave a lukewarm review of the PC version. In the UK, Official UK PlayStation Magazine gave the PS version eight out of ten and liked its structure, but said that many of the 70 cars were indistinguishable, and criticised the lifespan. They described the handling as "arcadey", and warned people who didn't like Porsches to "steer well clear". The D-Pad Destroyer of GamePro was positive to the PlayStation version and praised the manufacturer license of Porsche cars as an innovation for the series. (Note: GamePro gave the PlayStation version 3/5 for graphics, 4/5 for sound, and two 4.5/5 scores for control and fun factor.) Thomas Crymes called the PC version as "entertaining and refined racer". (Note: GamePro gave the PC version 4/5 for graphics, sound, control, and fun factor.)

PC Gamer US named the PC version the best racing game of 2000. It also won the award for "Driving Game of the Year" at GameSpot's Best and Worst of 2000 Awards. It was a runner-up for "Racing" at Computer Gaming World's 2001 Premier Awards, which went to Motocross Madness 2. During the AIAS' 4th Annual Interactive Achievement Awards, it received a nomination for the "PC Simulation" award, which was ultimately given to MechWarrior 4: Vengeance. The staff of Computer Games Magazine nominated it for their 2000 "Racing Game of the Year" award, whose winner remains unknown. It was also nominated for the Racing Game of the Year award at the CNET Gamecenter Computer Game Awards for 2000, whose winner was unfortunately lost to time. The PlayStation version was a runner-up for the "Racing Game of 2000" award in Readers' Choice at IGN's Best of 2000 Awards for PlayStation.

The PC version sold 74,795 units in the U.S. by the end of 2000. This accounted for $2.58 million in revenue. Domestic sales rose to 340,000 units, for revenues of $6.3 million, by August 2006. At the time, this led Edge to declare it the country's 52nd-best-selling computer game released since January 2000.

In the German market, the game debuted at #4 on Media Control's computer game sales rankings for March 2000. Securing fifth place the following month, it proceeded to remain in the top 20 through June, before dropping to 27th in July and 39th in August. Sales in the region totaled roughly 65,000 units by late 2000, a figure with which Electronic Arts was "not dissatisfied", according to PC Player's Udo Hoffman. However, he noted that the title had underperformed compared to its predecessors, and was part of a downturn in computer game sales that year.

== See also ==
- The Porsche Legend (1995)
- Porsche Challenge (1997)
- Porsche Hall of Legends VR (2020)
- Porsche Virtual Roads (2022)
