= 1995 in video games =

1995 saw many sequels and prequels in video games, such as Dragon Quest VI, Mega Man 7, Super Mario World 2: Yoshi's Island, Donkey Kong Country 2: Diddy's Kong Quest, and Tekken 2, along with new titles such as Mario's Picross, Battle Arena Toshinden, Chrono Trigger, Rayman, Twisted Metal, Star Wars: Dark Forces, Destruction Derby, Wipeout and Jumping Flash!

The year's highest-grossing arcade game in Japan was Virtua Fighter 2, while the best-selling arcade video games in the United States were Daytona USA (for the second year in a row) and Mortal Kombat 3. The home video game with the highest known sales in 1995 was Dragon Quest VI, despite only releasing in Japan. The Super Famicom was the best-selling game console in Japan, while the North American Super Nintendo was the best-selling console in North America.

== Legend ==
Video game platforms
3DO	3DO	AMI	Amiga	Arcade	Arcade video game
DOS	PC DOS / MS-DOS, Windows 3.X	GB	Game Boy	GEN	Genesis / Mega Drive
GG	Game Gear	JAG	Atari Jaguar	MAC	Classic Mac OS, 2001 and before
NES	Nintendo Entertainment System / Famicom	PCFX	PC-FX	PS1	PlayStation 1
SAT	Sega Saturn	SCD	Sega CD / Mega-CD	SNES	Super NES / Super Famicom / Super Comboy
WIN	Windows, all versions Windows 95 and up				

Video game genres
Action-adventure	Action-adventure game	Adventure	Adventure game	Artillery	Artillery game
Brawler	Beat 'em up	Fighting	Fighting game	FPS	First-person shooter
Platformer	Platformer	Puzzle	Puzzle video game	Racing	Racing video game
Roguelike	Roguelike, Roguelite	RPG	Role-playing video game	RTS	Real-time strategy
Simulation	Simulation video game	Sports	Sports video game	TBS	Turn-based strategy
TPS	Third-person shooter				

== Hardware releases ==
- Nintendo releases:
  - March 20 – Game Boy Play It Loud! series, color/clear versions of the Game Boy.
  - April 23 – Satellaview accessory for the Super Famicom console in Japan only.
  - July 21 – Virtual Boy 32-bit console in Japan. It is discontinued on December 22.

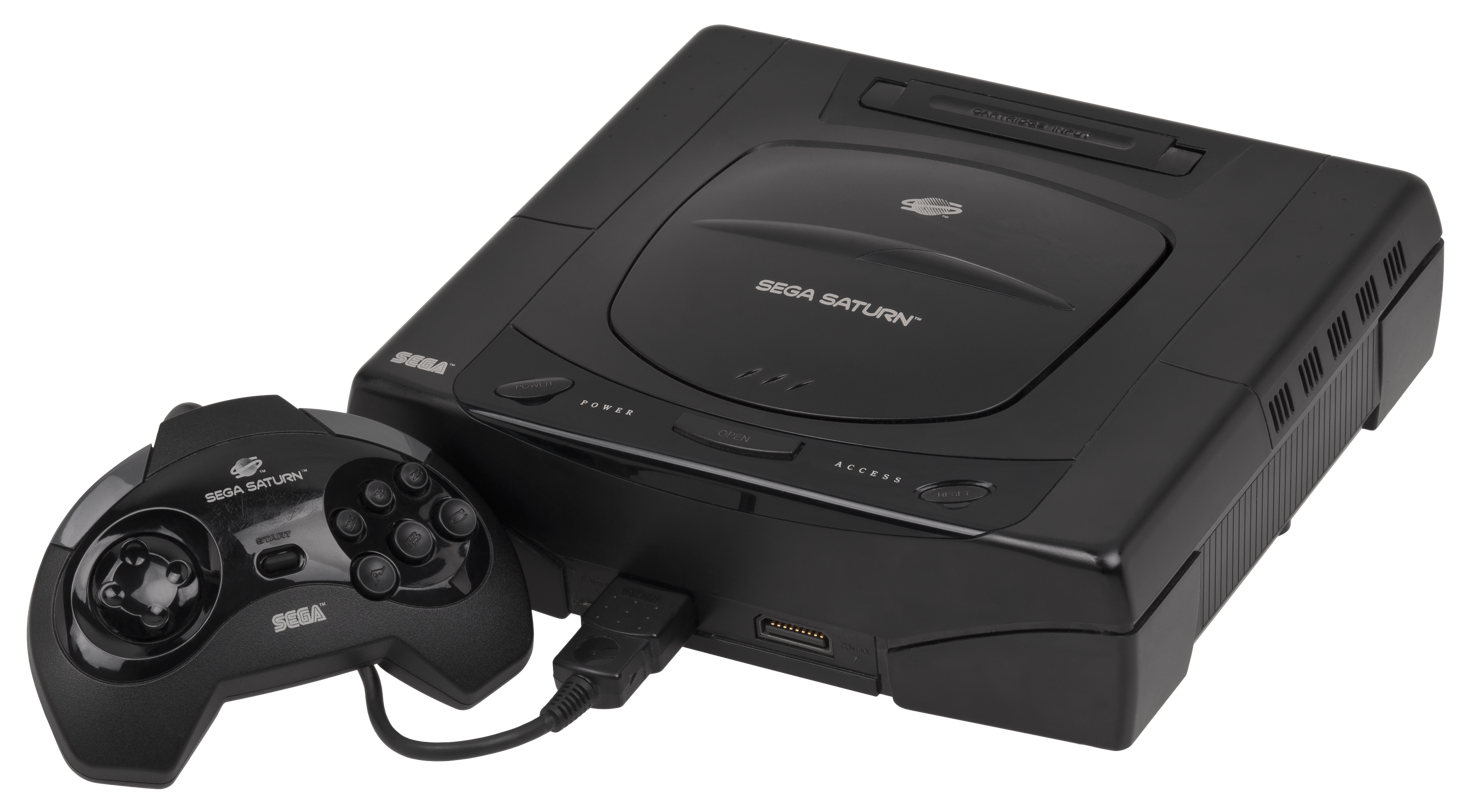
Sega Saturn

- May 11 – Sega releases the Sega Saturn console in North America.
- August 14 – The Nintendo Entertainment System (NES) is discontinued in North America.
- September 9 – Sony releases the PlayStation console in the United States.
- September 29 – Sony releases the PlayStation console in Europe.
- October 25 – Funtech releases the Super A'Can console in Taiwan.
- Full date unknown
  - R-Zone
  - VFX1 Headgear

== Top-rated games ==
=== Major awards ===
Category/Publication	Game Players 1995 Awards (Christmas 1995)	Gamest 9th Gamest Awards (December 1995)	GameFan 4th Annual 1995 Megawards (January 1996)	GamePro 1995 Editors' Choice Awards (February 1996)	Electronic Gaming Monthly 1996 Buyer's Guide Awards	Nintendo Power Nintendo Power Awards (May 1996)
Game of the Year	Virtua Fighter 2	Virtua Fighter 2	Yoshi's Island (16-bit), Jumping Flash! (32-bit)	—N/a	Twisted Metal	—N/a
Best Arcade Game	Alpine Racer	Virtua Fighter 2	—N/a	Tekken 2	Tekken 2	—N/a
Best PlayStation Game	Wipeout	—N/a	Jumping Flash!	Doom	Twisted Metal	—N/a
Best Saturn Game	Virtua Fighter 2	—N/a	Virtua Fighter 2	Virtua Fighter 2	Panzer Dragoon	—N/a
Best SNES Game	Donkey Kong Country 2: Diddy's Kong Quest	—N/a	Yoshi's Island	Donkey Kong Country 2: Diddy's Kong Quest	Chrono Trigger	Chrono Trigger
Best Genesis Game	NHL 96	—N/a	Vectorman	Vectorman	Vectorman	—N/a
Best 3DO Game	Blade Force	—N/a	D	Wolfenstein 3D	Gex	—N/a
Best Jaguar Game	Rayman	—N/a	—N/a	Defender 2000	Cannon Fodder	—N/a
Best Neo-Geo Game	—N/a	—N/a	—N/a	World Heroes Perfect	The King of Fighters '95	—N/a
Best CD-i Game	—N/a	—N/a	—N/a	Chaos Control	—N/a	—N/a
Best Sega CD Game	Eternal Champions: Challenge from the Dark Side	—N/a	—N/a	Earthworm Jim: Special Edition	Lunar: Eternal Blue	—N/a
Best 32X Game	Virtua Fighter	—N/a	—N/a	WWF WrestleMania: The Arcade Game	Virtua Fighter	—N/a
Best Game Boy Game	Arcade Classic series (Asteroids, Missile Command, Centipede, Millipede, Galaga, Galaxian, Defender, Joust)	—N/a	Donkey Kong Land	Donkey Kong Land	Donkey Kong Land	Donkey Kong Land
Best Game Gear Game	Garfield: Caught in the Act	—N/a	Ristar	Super Star Wars: Return of the Jedi	Super Star Wars: Return of the Jedi	—N/a
Best Virtual Boy Game	Mario's Tennis	—N/a	Red Alarm	Mario's Tennis	Red Alarm	Virtual Boy Wario Land
Best Story	—N/a	—N/a	—N/a	—N/a	Unknown	Chrono Trigger
Best Visuals	Virtua Fighter 2 (32-bit), Donkey Kong Country 2: Diddy's Kong Quest (16-bit)	Virtua Fighter 2	—N/a	—N/a	Rayman	Donkey Kong Country 2: Diddy's Kong Quest
Best Music/Sound	Twisted Metal	Vampire Hunter: Darkstalkers' Revenge (Night Warriors)	Skeleton Warriors	—N/a	Chrono Trigger and Rayman (tie)	Donkey Kong Country 2: Diddy's Kong Quest
Best Fighting Game	Virtua Fighter 2	Virtua Fighter 2	Virtua Fighter 2 and Killer Instinct (tie)	—N/a	Battle Arena Toshinden	Killer Instinct
Best Sports Game	World Series Baseball (Saturn)	—N/a	—N/a	NFL GameDay	NFL GameDay	NHL 96
Best Action/Platform Game	Jumping Flash!	Puyo Puyo 2	Yoshi's Island	—N/a	Yoshi's Island	—N/a
Best RPG	Chrono Trigger	—N/a	EarthBound	Chrono Trigger	Chrono Trigger	Chrono Trigger
Best Shooter	Virtua Cop	TwinBee Yahho!	Panzer Dragoon and Pulstar (tie)	—N/a	Philosoma	—N/a
Best Driving/Racing Game	Wipeout	—N/a	Sega Rally Championship and Wipeout (tie)	—N/a	Ridge Racer	—N/a
Best Flight Simulator	Warhawk	—N/a	Warhawk	—N/a	Air Combat	—N/a
Best Adventure Game	Beyond Oasis	—N/a	D, The Mansion of Hidden Souls, Discworld (tie)	—N/a	Unknown	Chrono Trigger

=== Famitsu Platinum Hall of Fame ===
The following video game releases in 1995 entered Famitsu magazine's "Platinum Hall of Fame" for receiving Famitsu scores of at least 35 out of 40.

Title	Platform	Publisher	Genre	Score (out of 40)
Virtua Fighter 2	SAT	Sega	Fighting	39
Ridge Racer Revolution	PS1	Namco	Racing	39
Tekken	PS1	Namco	Fighting	38
Fushigi no Dungeon 2: Furai no Shiren (Mystery Dungeon: Shiren the Wanderer)	SNES	Chunsoft	Roguelike	38
Sega Rally Championship	SAT	Sega	Racing	36
Virtua Fighter Remix	SAT	Sega	Fighting	35
King's Field II	PS1	FromSoftware	RPG	35
Boxer's Road	PS1	New Corporation	Sports (boxing)	35
Shin Megami Tensei: Devil Summoner	SAT	Atlus	RPG	35

== Financial performance ==
=== Highest-grossing arcade games ===
==== Japan ====
In Japan, the following titles were the highest-grossing arcade video games of 1995, according to the annual Gamest and Game Machine charts.

Rank	Gamest		Game Machine		
Rank	Title	Manufacturer	Title	Type	Points
1	Virtua Fighter 2	Sega	Virtua Fighter 2	PCB / DX	7887
2	Street Fighter Zero (Street Fighter Alpha)	Capcom	Daytona USA	2P / DX	3721
3	Vampire Hunter: Darkstalkers' Revenge (Night Warriors)	Capcom	Sega Rally Championship	2P / DX	3456
4	Tekken	Namco	Virtua Cop	Dedicated	3204
5	The King of Fighters '94	SNK	Puzzle Bobble (Bust-a-Move)	PCB	3186
6	Super Street Fighter II X (Super Street Fighter II Turbo)	Capcom	Taisen Puzzle-Dama (Crazy Cross)	PCB	3111
7	X-Men: Children of the Atom	Capcom	Puyo Puyo 2	PCB	2639
8	Shin Samurai Spirits (Samurai Shodown II)	SNK	Tetris (Sega)	PCB	2638
9	Tekken 2	Namco	Shanghai III	PCB	2455
10	Puzzle Bobble (Bust-a-Move)	Taito	Ace Driver	Dedicated	2414

==== United States ====
In the United States, the following titles were the highest-grossing arcade video games of 1995, according to the American Amusement Machine Association (AAMA) and Amusement & Music Operators Association (AMOA).

Rank	AAMA		AMOA	
Rank	Title	Award	Dedicated cabinet	Conversion kit
1	Daytona USA, Neo Geo MVS, Mortal Kombat 3	Diamond	Cruis'n USA	Mortal Kombat 3
2	Daytona USA, Neo Geo MVS, Mortal Kombat 3	Diamond	Daytona USA, Killer Instinct, Mortal Kombat II, Mortal Kombat 3	Mortal Kombat II, Raiden II, Tekken, X-Men: Children of the Atom
3	Daytona USA, Neo Geo MVS, Mortal Kombat 3	Diamond	Daytona USA, Killer Instinct, Mortal Kombat II, Mortal Kombat 3	Mortal Kombat II, Raiden II, Tekken, X-Men: Children of the Atom
4	Sega Rally Championship, WWF WrestleMania, Area 51	Platinum	Daytona USA, Killer Instinct, Mortal Kombat II, Mortal Kombat 3	Mortal Kombat II, Raiden II, Tekken, X-Men: Children of the Atom
5	Sega Rally Championship, WWF WrestleMania, Area 51	Platinum	Daytona USA, Killer Instinct, Mortal Kombat II, Mortal Kombat 3	Mortal Kombat II, Raiden II, Tekken, X-Men: Children of the Atom
6	Sega Rally Championship, WWF WrestleMania, Area 51	Platinum	—N/a	—N/a
7	2 on 2 Open Ice Challenge, Indy 500, Virtua Fighter 2, Virtua Cop	Silver	—N/a	—N/a
8	2 on 2 Open Ice Challenge, Indy 500, Virtua Fighter 2, Virtua Cop	Silver	—N/a	—N/a
9	2 on 2 Open Ice Challenge, Indy 500, Virtua Fighter 2, Virtua Cop	Silver	—N/a	—N/a
10	2 on 2 Open Ice Challenge, Indy 500, Virtua Fighter 2, Virtua Cop	Silver	—N/a	—N/a

=== Best-selling video game consoles ===
Rank	Manufacturer	Game console	Type	Generation	Sales		
Rank	Manufacturer	Game console	Type	Generation	Japan	USA	Worldwide
1	Nintendo	SNES	Home	16-bit	1,780,000	1,900,000	3,518,000+
2	Sony	PS1	Home	32-bit	1,700,000	800,000	3,100,000
3	Sega	SAT	Home	32-bit	1,660,000	400,000	2,060,000+
4	Sega	GEN	Home	16-bit	30,000	1,700,000	1,998,000+
5	Nintendo	GB	Handheld	8-bit	1,000,000	Unknown	1,000,000+
6	Panasonic	3DO	Home	32-bit	150,000	250,000	400,000+
7	Nintendo	NES	Home	8-bit	80,000	104,000	184,000+
8	Sega	GG	Handheld	8-bit	180,000	Unknown	180,000+
9	Atari Corp	JAG	Home	32-bit	Unknown	150,000	150,000+
10	NEC	PCFX	Home	32-bit	120,000	Unknown	120,000+

=== Best-selling home video games ===
The following titles were the top ten best-selling home video games of 1995 in Japan and the United States.

Rank	Title	Platform	Sales		
Rank	Title	Platform	Japan	USA	Combined
1	Dragon Quest VI: Maboroshi no Daichi (Realms of Reverie)	SNES	2,482,640	—N/a	2,482,640
2	Chrono Trigger	SNES	2,000,000+	Unknown	2,000,000+
2	Super Mario World 2: Yoshi's Island	SNES	1,000,000+	1,000,000+	2,000,000+
2	Mortal Kombat 3	SNES, GEN	—N/a	2,000,000+	2,000,000+
5	Donkey Kong Country 2: Diddy's Kong Quest	SNES	987,295	1,000,000+	1,987,295+
6	Donkey Kong Country (Super Donkey Kong)	SNES	643,028	1,000,000+	1,643,028+
7	Virtua Fighter 2	SAT	1,500,000+	Unknown	1,500,000+
8	Derby Stallion III	SNES	1,086,141	—N/a	1,086,141
9	Killer Instinct	SNES	—N/a	1,000,000+	1,000,000+
10	Tekken	PS1	942,000	Unknown	942,000+

==== Japan ====
In Japan, the following titles were the top ten best-selling home video games of 1995.

Rank	Title	Platform	Publisher	Genre	Sales	Ref
1	Dragon Quest VI: Maboroshi no Daichi (Realms of Reverie)	SNES	Enix	RPG	2,482,640	
2	Chrono Trigger	SNES	Squaresoft	RPG	2,000,000+	
3	Virtua Fighter 2	SAT	Sega	Fighting	1,500,000+	
4	Derby Stallion III	SNES	ASCII Corporation	Simulation	1,086,141	
5	Super Mario: Yoshi Island (Super Mario World 2: Yoshi's Island)	SNES	Nintendo	Platformer	1,000,000+	
6	Super Donkey Kong 2: Dixie & Diddy (Donkey Kong Country 2)	SNES	Nintendo	Platformer	987,295	
7	Tekken	PS1	Namco	Fighting	942,000	
8	Romancing SaGa 3	SNES	Squaresoft	RPG	786,000	
9	Arc the Lad	PS1	Sony	RPG	697,000	
10	Mobile Suit Gundam	PS1	Bandai	FPS	668,242	

==== United States ====
In the United States, the following titles were the top ten best-selling home video games of 1995.

Rank	Title	Publisher	Genre	Platform(s)	Sales
1	Mortal Kombat 3	Williams Entertainment	Fighting	SNES, GEN	2,000,000+
2	Donkey Kong Country	Nintendo	Platformer	SNES	1,000,000+
3	Killer Instinct	Nintendo	Fighting	SNES	1,000,000+
4	Donkey Kong Country 2: Diddy's Kong Quest	Nintendo	Platformer	SNES	1,000,000+
5	Super Mario World 2: Yoshi's Island	Nintendo	Platformer	SNES	1,000,000+
6	Madden NFL '96	EA Sports	Sports	GEN	Unknown
7	NBA Jam: Tournament Edition	Acclaim Entertainment	Sports	GEN	Unknown
8	NBA Jam: Tournament Edition	Acclaim Entertainment	Sports	SNES	Unknown
9	Mortal Kombat II	Acclaim Entertainment	Fighting	GEN	Unknown
10	The Lion King	Virgin Interactive	Platformer	SNES	Unknown

==== United Kingdom ====
In the United Kingdom, the following titles were the best-selling home video games of 1995.

Rank	CD-ROM	Cartridge
1	FIFA Soccer 96	
2	Destruction Derby	FIFA Soccer 95
3	Command & Conquer	The Lion King
4	Discworld	Theme Park
5	Star Trek: The Next Generation – A Final Unity	Mortal Kombat 3
6	Star Wars: Dark Forces	Killer Instinct
7	Wipeout	Mickey Mania
8	Tekken	Brian Lara Cricket
9	Star Wars: Rebel Assault	Micro Machines Turbo Tournament '96
10	Theme Park	Premier Manager

== Events ==
- January or February – Stars! is released as shareware.
- April 6 – Funco Inc., parent company of video game retailer FuncoLand, announces that vice president and director Stanley Bodine is promoted to president and chief operating officer, replacing founder David R. Pomije, who will remain as chairman and chief executive. Financial controller Robert Hiben is also named chief financial officer, while vice president of merchandising and information systems Michael Hinnenkamp resigns from the company to pursue other career opportunities.
- May 11 – Introduction of trade magazine GameWeek (then called Video Game Advisor).
- May 11–13 – The 1st annual Electronic Entertainment Expo (E3) is held in Los Angeles, California.
- November 5 – GameFAQs debuts on the web, as an archive of video game FAQs.
- November 24 – Nintendo unveils a playable version of the Nintendo Ultra 64, later renamed the Nintendo 64, at the 7th Annual Nintendo Space World Software Exhibition in Japan. Thirteen games were demonstrated but only two were in playable form, Kirby Ball 64 and Super Mario 64.

=== Business ===
- New companies: BioWare, Frog City, Interworld Productions (renamed Mythic Entertainment in 1997), Remedy, TalonSoft
- Defunct: Cyberdreams
- Nintendo v. Samsung Electronics; Nintendo sues Samsung for promoting software piracy. The suit is settled.
- Nintendo of America, Inc. v. NTDEC

== Games released in 1995 ==
Release Date	Title	Platform	Developer/Publisher	Genre	Ref
January 1	Battle Arena Toshinden	PS1	Tamsoft/SCEA	Fighting	
January 13	Bust-a-Move	SNES	Taito		
February 15	Star Wars: Dark Forces	DOS	LucasArts	FPS	
February 16	Ristar	GEN	Sonic Team/Sega	Platformer	
February 24	Front Mission	SNES	G-Craft/Squaresoft		
March 10	Panzer Dragoon	SAT	Team Andromeda/Sega		
March 11	Chrono Trigger	SNES	Square		
March 14	Mario's Picross	GB	Jupiter/Nintendo	Puzzle	
March 17	Descent	DOS	Parallax Software		
March 17	Discworld	DOS, MAC, PS1	Psygnosis		
March 21	Kirby's Dream Land 2	GB	HAL Laboratory/Nintendo		
March 24	Mega Man 7	SNES	Capcom		
April	Jagged Alliance	DOS	Madlab Software/Sir-Tech		
April	Frontier: First Encounters	DOS	Frontier Developments	Space trading, simulation	
April 15	Mortal Kombat 3	Arcade, SNES, PS1, GB, GEN			
April 27	Jumping Flash!	PS1	Exact/SCEA		
April 28	Super Bomberman 3	SNES	Hudson Soft		
April 30	Full Throttle	DOS, MAC	LucasArts	Adventure	
May 25	Light Crusader	GEN	Treasure/Sega		
May	King Arthur & the Knights of Justice	SNES	Enix		
June 5	Street Fighter Alpha	Arcade	Capcom		
June 7	Flight Unlimited	DOS, WIN	Looking Glass Studios		
June 21	Tekken 2	Arcade	Namco		
June 30	Star Trek: The Next Generation – A Final Unity	DOS, MAC	Spectrum HoloByte		
July 11	Space Quest 6	DOS, MAC	Sierra Online	Adventure	
July 21	Castlevania: Dracula X	SNES	Konami		
July 24	MechWarrior 2	DOS	Activision		
July 25	The King of Fighters '95	Arcade	SNK		
July 31	Phantasmagoria	DOS, WIN, MAC	Sierra Online	Adventure	
August 2	Comix Zone	GEN	Sega	Brawler	
August 5	Super Mario World 2: Yoshi's Island	SNES	Nintendo	Platformer	
August 11	Shining Wisdom	SAT	Camelot/Sega	Action-adventure	
August 31	Command & Conquer	DOS, MAC	Westwood Studios	RTS	
August 31	Fade to Black	DOS	Delphine Software International	TPS	
August 31	Heroes of Might and Magic: A Strategic Quest	DOS	New World Computing	TBS	
September	Wild Woody	SCD	Sega		
September 9	Rayman	PS1, SAT, JAG	Ubisoft		
September 22	Exector	PS1	Arc System Works		
October 1	Secret of Evermore	SNES	Square		
October 6	Tactics Ogre: Let Us Cling Together	SNES	Quest Corporation		
October 13	Hyper Iria	SNES	Banpresto		
October 15	Hexen: Beyond Heretic	DOS, MAC	Raven Software/id Software		
October 20	Terranigma	SNES	Quintet		
October 27	Panel de Pon	SNES	Intelligent Systems/Nintendo		
October 31	Destruction Derby	PS1	Reflections Interactive/Psygnosis		
October 31	I Have No Mouth, and I Must Scream	DOS, MAC	Cyberdreams	Adventure	
October 31	Star Wars: TIE Fighter (Collector's CD-ROM)	WIN, MAC	LucasArts		
November 5	Twisted Metal	PS1	SingleTrac/Sony Computer Entertainment	Vehicular combat	
November 11	Romancing SaGa 3	SNES	Square		
November 20	Donkey Kong Country 2: Diddy's Kong Quest	SNES	Rareware/Nintendo		
November 24	Battle Arena Toshinden 2	PS1, Arcade	Tamsoft/Capcom		
November 24	Marathon 2: Durandal	MAC	Bungie		
November 30	The Dig	DOS, MAC	LucasArts	Adventure	
December	Worms	AMI	Team17	Artillery	
December	Time Crisis	Arcade	Namco	light gun	
December 1	Mega Man X3	SNES	Capcom		
December 9	Dragon Quest VI: Realms of Revelation	SNES	Heartbeat/Enix		
December 9	Warcraft II: Tides of Darkness	DOS, MAC	Blizzard		
December 15	Tales of Phantasia	SNES	Namco		
December 15	Suikoden	PS1	Konami		
December 15	Brain Dead 13	DOS	ReadySoft	Adventure	
December 22	Final Fight 3	SNES	Capcom		
December 29	Eko Eko Azarak: Wizard of Darkness	PS1	PolyGram	Visual novel	
December 29	Wizard's Harmony	PS1, SAT	Arc System Works	Raising sim	
December 31	The Beast Within: A Gabriel Knight Mystery	DOS, WIN, MAC	Sierra On-Line	Adventure	
December 31	King's Field II	PS1	From Software		

== See also ==
- 1995 in games
