= PlayStation Hits =

Sony discounted video game reprint brand

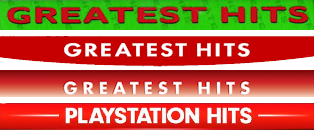
Official banners used on PlayStation game covers

PlayStation Hits (formerly Greatest Hits) is a branding used by Sony Interactive Entertainment for discounted reprints of PlayStation video games. The branding is used for reprints of popular, top-selling games for each console in the PlayStation family, which are deliberately sold with a lower MSRP than the original production runs of a game, and feature special branding—colored in red since PlayStation 2—on their box art, as well as red-colored cases on PlayStation Portable, PlayStation Vita, PlayStation 3, and PlayStation 4 releases (instead of the traditional clear or blue-colored casing).

Equivalent programs exist in Europe and Oceania (as "Essentials"), Japan and select Asian countries (as "The Best"), South Korea (as "BigHit"), and in South America (as "Favoritos"). PlayStation Hits is used as the branding label for PlayStation 4 games in North America, Brazil, Europe, Oceania, Japan, and select Asian countries.

== History ==
Sony Computer Entertainment America introduced the program for PlayStation in March 1997 and the first releases were Battle Arena Toshinden, NFL GameDay, NHL FaceOff, Twisted Metal and Warhawk. The requirement for being a Greatest Hits title was selling at least 150,000 copies and being on the market for at least a year. Minimum sales required eventually rose to 500,000 by January 1999. When the program came to PlayStation 2 in 2002, games could become Greatest Hits titles after selling at least 400,000 copies and being on the market for at least nine months, while the threshold for PS1 games was reduced to 250,000 sales.

Suggested retail prices of Greatest Hits titles are typically $19.99, although multi-game packs may sell for $24.99. Though Sony-developed games are virtually guaranteed to eventually become Greatest Hits titles by meeting their sales and age requirements, 3rd party developers are not required to release their titles with a Greatest Hits label even if said titles meet the criteria. Additionally, Sony allows 3rd party developers some flexibility in the pricing of their own Greatest Hits titles, but most of them stick to the agreed-upon suggested retail price. Games that are multi-million sellers may become Greatest Hits titles much later than 9 months to maximize profits. It is also a common practice for a game to re-release on the Greatest Hits label at a close proximity to the release of that game's sequel or follow-up.

In 2006, Sony extended the Greatest Hits program to the PlayStation Portable. To qualify, a title must be on the market for at least 9 months and have sold 250,000 copies or more. The Greatest Hits price for PlayStation Portable games typically begins at $19.99. On July 28, 2008, the program was introduced on the PlayStation 3. A PlayStation 3 game must be on the market for 10 months and sell at least 500,000 copies to meet the Greatest Hits criteria. PlayStation 3 Greatest Hits titles currently sell at $29.99.

Sony announced the launch of Greatest Hits on PlayStation 4 in Mexico, Canada, and the United States, renamed PlayStation Hits, on June 19, 2018. As with PS3 Greatest Hits releases, they feature red-colored packaging and a red banner on their box art and disc. PlayStation Hits pricing will also be available on PlayStation Store.

== "Special edition" Greatest Hits ==
While Greatest Hits titles are usually just a re-release of the original game with altered packaging and a lower price, occasionally a game is given a "special edition" of its original version, released under the Greatest Hits label. Usually these additions are small bonuses, such as the inclusion of bugfixes, new game demos or soundtrack CDs, or slight improvements such as adding analog control or vibration functionality to games that did not have these features in their original releases. Occasionally, significant changes are implemented into the game. Noteworthy examples of this are the Greatest Hits special editions of Devil May Cry 3: Dante's Awakening, Dragon Ball Z: Budokai 3, Heavy Rain, Jet Moto 2, The Lost World: Jurassic Park, Midnight Club 3: DUB Edition, Midnight Club Los Angeles, Silent Hill 2, Virtua Fighter 4: Evolution, and Spyro: Year of the Dragon, which were enhanced significantly from their original releases with added characters, levels, modes, features, etc.

== List of official Greatest Hits titles ==
=== PlayStation ===
The following titles have been released on the Greatest Hits label for PlayStation.

- 007: Tomorrow Never Dies
- 007: The World Is Not Enough
- 1Xtreme
- 2Xtreme
- A Bug's Life
- Activision Classics
- Air Combat
- Alien Trilogy
- Andretti Racing
- Ape Escape
- Army Men 3D
- Army Men: Air Attack
- Asteroids
- Battle Arena Toshinden
- Casper
- Castlevania: Symphony of the Night
- Chrono Cross
- Cool Boarders 2
- Cool Boarders 3
- Cool Boarders 4
- Crash Bandicoot
- Crash Bandicoot 2: Cortex Strikes Back
- Crash Bandicoot: Warped
- Crash Bash
- Crash Team Racing
- Croc: Legend of the Gobbos
- Dance Dance Revolution Konamix
- Dave Mirra Freestyle BMX
- Destruction Derby
- Destruction Derby 2
- Die Hard Trilogy
- Digimon Digital Card Battle
- Digimon Rumble Arena
- Digimon World
- Digimon World 2
- Digimon World 3
- Dino Crisis
- Disney's Tarzan
- Doom
- Dragon Ball Z: Ultimate Battle 22
- Driver
- Driver 2
- Duke Nukem: Time to Kill
- The Dukes of Hazzard: Racing for Home
- Fighting Force
- Final Fantasy VII
- Final Fantasy VIII
- Final Fantasy IX
- Final Fantasy Anthology
- Final Fantasy Chronicles
- Final Fantasy Origins
- Final Fantasy Tactics
- Formula 1
- Frogger
- Frogger 2: Swampy's Revenge
- Gran Turismo
- Gran Turismo 2
- Grand Theft Auto
- Grand Theft Auto 2
- Harry Potter and the Philosopher's Stone
- Hot Wheels Turbo Racing
- Jeremy McGrath SuperCross '98
- Jet Moto
- Jet Moto 2: Championship Edition
- Legacy of Kain: Soul Reaver
- The Legend of Dragoon
- Loaded
- The Lost World: Jurassic Park – Special Edition
- Madden NFL 98
- Mat Hoffman's Pro BMX
- Medal of Honor
- Medal of Honor: Underground
- Mega Man 8
- Mega Man Legends
- Mega Man X4
- Metal Gear Solid
- Monopoly
- Monsters, Inc. Scream Team
- Mortal Kombat Trilogy
- Mortal Kombat 4
- Namco Museum Vol. 1
- Namco Museum Vol. 3
- NASCAR 98
- NASCAR 99
- The Need for Speed
- Need for Speed II
- Need for Speed III: Hot Pursuit
- Need for Speed: High Stakes
- NFL Blitz
- NFL Blitz 2000
- NFL GameDay
- NFL GameDay '97
- NHL 98
- NHL FaceOff
- NHL FaceOff '97
- Nuclear Strike
- Oddworld: Abe's Oddysee
- Pac-Man World
- Parasite Eve
- Rampage World Tour
- Rayman
- Ready 2 Rumble Boxing
- Reel Fishing
- Resident Evil: Director's Cut (Dual Shock Version)
- Resident Evil 2 (Dual Shock Version)
- Resident Evil 3: Nemesis
- Ridge Racer
- Road Rash
- Road Rash 3D
- Rocket Power: Team Rocket Rescue
- Rugrats: Search for Reptar
- Scooby-Doo and the Cyber Chase
- Silent Hill
- SimCity 2000
- Sled Storm
- Soul Blade
- Soviet Strike
- Spider-Man
- Spider-Man 2: Enter: Electro
- SpongeBob SquarePants: SuperSponge
- Spyro the Dragon
- Spyro 2: Ripto's Rage!
- Spyro: Year of the Dragon
- Star Wars: Dark Forces
- Star Wars: Episode I – Jedi Power Battles
- Star Wars: Episode I – The Phantom Menace
- Star Wars: Rebel Assault II – The Hidden Empire
- Street Fighter Alpha 3
- Stuart Little 2
- Syphon Filter
- Syphon Filter 2
- Syphon Filter 3
- Tekken
- Tekken 2
- Tekken 3
- Ten Pin Alley
- Tenchu: Stealth Assassins
- Tenchu 2: Birth of the Stealth Assassins
- Test Drive 4
- Test Drive 5
- Test Drive: Off-Road
- Tetris Plus
- TNN Motorsports Hardcore 4x4
- Tom Clancy's Rainbow Six
- Tomb Raider
- Tomb Raider II
- Tomb Raider III: Adventures of Lara Croft
- Tomb Raider: The Last Revelation
- Tony Hawk's Pro Skater
- Tony Hawk's Pro Skater 2
- Tony Hawk's Pro Skater 3
- Tony Hawk's Pro Skater 4
- Toy Story 2: Buzz Lightyear to the Rescue
- Triple Play 98
- Triple Play 2001
- Twisted Metal
- Twisted Metal 2
- Twisted Metal III
- Twisted Metal 4
- Vagrant Story
- Vigilante 8
- Vigilante 8: 2nd Offense
- Warhawk
- WCW Nitro
- WCW vs. the World
- Wheel of Fortune
- Who Wants to Be a Millionaire: 2nd Edition
- Wipeout
- WWF SmackDown!
- WWF SmackDown! 2: Know Your Role
- WWF War Zone
- WWF WrestleMania: The Arcade Game
- X-Men: Mutant Academy
- Xenogears

=== PlayStation 2 ===
The following titles have been released on the Greatest Hits label for PlayStation 2.

- 007: Agent Under Fire
- 007: Everything or Nothing
- 007: Nightfire
- 24: The Game
- 50 Cent: Bulletproof
- Ace Combat 04: Shattered Skies
- Ace Combat 5: The Unsung War
- American Chopper
- American Chopper 2: Full Throttle
- ATV Offroad Fury
- ATV Offroad Fury 2
- ATV Offroad Fury 3
- ATV Offroad Fury 4
- Avatar: The Last Airbender
- Baldur's Gate: Dark Alliance
- Battlefield 2: Modern Combat
- Ben 10: Alien Force
- Ben 10: Protector of Earth
- Beyond Good & Evil
- Black
- Blitz: The League
- Blowout
- Brothers in Arms: Road to Hill 30
- Bully
- Burnout
- Burnout 2: Point of Impact
- Burnout 3: Takedown
- Burnout Revenge
- Cabela's Big Game Hunter
- Cabela's Dangerous Hunts
- Cabela's Deer Hunt: 2004 Season
- Call of Duty: Finest Hour
- Call of Duty 2: Big Red One
- Call of Duty 3 Special Edition
- Call of Duty: World at War – Final Fronts
- Cars
- Champions of Norrath
- Charlie and the Chocolate Factory
- Chicken Little
- The Chronicles of Narnia: The Lion, the Witch and the Wardrobe
- Conflict: Desert Storm
- Conflict: Desert Storm II - Back to Baghdad
- Crash Bandicoot: The Wrath of Cortex
- Crash Nitro Kart
- Crash Tag Team Racing
- Crazy Taxi
- Dance Dance Revolution Extreme
- Dark Cloud
- Dark Cloud 2
- Dave Mirra Freestyle BMX 2
- DDRMAX2 Dance Dance Revolution
- Dead to Rights
- Def Jam: Fight for NY
- Def Jam Vendetta
- Destroy All Humans!
- Destroy All Humans! 2
- Devil May Cry
- Devil May Cry 2
- Devil May Cry 3: Dante's Awakening Special Edition
- Dirge of Cerberus: Final Fantasy VII
- Disgaea: Hour of Darkness
- Dragon Ball Z: Budokai
- Dragon Ball Z: Budokai 2
- Dragon Ball Z: Budokai 3
- Dragon Ball Z: Budokai Tenkaichi
- Dragon Ball Z: Budokai Tenkaichi 2
- Dragon Ball Z: Budokai Tenkaichi 3
- Dragon Quest VIII: Journey of the Cursed King
- Driv3r
- Dynasty Warriors 4
- Dynasty Warriors 4: Empires
- Ed, Edd n Eddy: The Mis-Edventures
- Enter the Matrix
- Fantastic 4
- Fight Night 2004
- Fight Night Round 2
- Fight Night Round 3
- Final Fantasy X
- Final Fantasy X-2
- Final Fantasy XII
- Finding Nemo
- FlatOut
- FlatOut 2
- Flushed Away
- Freekstyle
- The Getaway
- Ghost Rider
- The Godfather: The Game
- God of War
- God of War II
- GoldenEye: Rogue Agent
- Gran Turismo 3: A-spec
- Gran Turismo 4
- Grand Theft Auto III
- Grand Theft Auto: San Andreas
- Grand Theft Auto: Vice City
- Guitar Hero
- Guitar Hero II
- Guitar Hero III: Legends of Rock
- Guitar Hero Encore: Rocks the 80s
- Harry Potter and the Chamber of Secrets
- Harry Potter and the Goblet of Fire
- Harry Potter and the Order of the Phoenix
- Harry Potter and the Prisoner of Azkaban
- Harry Potter: Quidditch World Cup
- High School Musical 3: Senior Year Dance
- Hitman 2: Silent Assassin
- Hitman: Contracts
- Hot Shots Golf 3
- Hot Shots Golf Fore!
- The Incredible Hulk: Ultimate Destruction
- The Incredibles
- Iron Man
- Jak and Daxter: The Precursor Legacy
- Jak II
- Jak 3
- Jak X: Combat Racing
- Jaws Unleashed
- Jet Li: Rise to Honor
- Juiced
- Kill.switch
- Killzone
- Kingdom Hearts
- Kingdom Hearts II
- Kingdom Hearts Re:Chain of Memories
- Legacy of Kain: Blood Omen 2
- Legacy of Kain: Soul Reaver 2
- The Legend of Spyro: A New Beginning
- Lego Batman: The Videogame
- Lego Indiana Jones: The Original Adventures
- Lego Star Wars: The Video Game
- Lego Star Wars II: The Original Trilogy
- The Lord of the Rings: The Two Towers
- The Lord of the Rings: The Return of the King
- The Lord of the Rings: The Third Age
- Madagascar
- Madden NFL 12
- Manhunt
- Marvel Nemesis: Rise of the Imperfects
- Marvel: Ultimate Alliance
- Max Payne
- Max Payne 2: The Fall of Max Payne
- Maximo: Ghosts to Glory
- Maximo vs. Army of Zin
- Meet the Robinsons
- Medal of Honor: European Assault
- Medal of Honor: Frontline
- Medal of Honor: Rising Sun
- Medal of Honor: Vanguard
- Mercenaries: Playground of Destruction
- Metal Gear Solid 2: Sons of Liberty
- Metal Gear Solid 3: Snake Eater
- Midnight Club: Street Racing
- Midnight Club II
- Midnight Club 3: DUB Edition Remix
- Mortal Kombat: Deadly Alliance
- Mortal Kombat: Deception
- Mortal Kombat: Armageddon
- Mortal Kombat: Shaolin Monks
- MVP Baseball 2005
- MX Unleashed
- MX vs. ATV Unleashed
- MX vs. ATV Untamed
- Myst III: Exile
- Namco Museum
- Namco Museum: 50th Anniversary
- Nanobreaker
- Naruto: Uzumaki Chronicles
- Naruto: Ultimate Ninja
- Naruto: Ultimate Ninja 2
- NASCAR Thunder 2003
- NASCAR Thunder 2004
- NBA 2K2
- NBA Ballers
- NBA Street
- NBA Street Vol. 2
- NBA Street V3
- Need for Speed: Carbon
- Need for Speed: Hot Pursuit 2
- Need for Speed: Most Wanted
- Need for Speed: ProStreet
- Need for Speed: Undercover
- Need for Speed: Underground
- Need for Speed: Underground 2
- NFL 2K2
- NFL Street
- NFL Street 2
- NFL Street 3
- Nicktoons Unite!
- Odin Sphere
- Ōkami
- Onimusha: Warlords
- Onimusha 2: Samurai's Destiny
- Over the Hedge
- Pac-Man World 2
- Pinball Hall of Fame: The Gottlieb Collection
- Pirates of the Caribbean: The Legend of Jack Sparrow
- Power Rangers: Dino Thunder
- Prince of Persia: The Sands of Time
- Prince of Persia: The Two Thrones
- Prince of Persia: Warrior Within
- Ratatouille
- Ratchet & Clank
- Ratchet & Clank: Going Commando
- Ratchet & Clank: Up Your Arsenal
- Ratchet: Deadlocked
- Rayman 2: Revolution
- Rayman 3: Hoodlum Havoc
- Rayman Arena
- RC Revenge Pro
- Red Dead Revolver
- Red Faction
- Red Faction II
- Resident Evil 4
- Resident Evil – Code: Veronica X
- Resident Evil Outbreak
- Robots
- Rock Band - Complete Edition
- Scarface: The World Is Yours
- Scooby-Doo! Night of 100 Frights
- Shadow of the Colossus
- Shadow the Hedgehog
- Shark Tale
- Shrek 2
- Shrek the Third
- Silent Hill 2: Director's Cut
- The Simpsons Game
- The Simpsons Hit and Run
- The Simpsons: Road Rage
- The Sims
- The Sims 2
- The Sims 2: Pets
- The Sims Bustin' Out
- Sly Cooper and the Thievius Raccoonus
- Sly 2: Band of Thieves
- Sly 3: Honor Among Thieves
- Smuggler's Run
- SOCOM U.S. Navy SEALs
- SOCOM II U.S. Navy SEALs
- SOCOM 3 U.S. Navy SEALs
- SOCOM U.S. Navy SEALs: Combined Assault
- Sonic Heroes
- Sonic Mega Collection Plus
- Sonic Riders
- Soulcalibur II
- Soulcalibur III
- Spider-Man
- Spider-Man 2
- Spider-Man 3
- Spider-Man: Friend or Foe
- SpongeBob SquarePants: Battle for Bikini Bottom
- SpongeBob SquarePants: Creature from the Krusty Krab
- SpongeBob SquarePants: Lights, Camera, Pants!
- The SpongeBob SquarePants Movie
- SpongeBob SquarePants: Revenge of the Flying Dutchman
- SpongeBob's Atlantis SquarePantis
- Spy Hunter
- Spyro: Enter the Dragonfly
- SSX
- SSX Tricky
- SSX 3
- Star Ocean: Till the End of Time
- Star Wars: Battlefront
- Star Wars: Battlefront II
- Star Wars: Bounty Hunter
- Star Wars Episode III: Revenge of the Sith
- Star Wars: Starfighter
- Star Wars: The Force Unleashed
- State of Emergency
- Street Hoops
- Stuntman
- Syphon Filter: The Omega Strain
- Tak and the Power of Juju
- Tekken 4
- Tekken 5
- Tekken Tag Tournament
- Tenchu: Wrath of Heaven
- Test Drive
- The Thing (video game)
- Thrillville
- TimeSplitters 2
- TMNT
- Tom Clancy's Ghost Recon
- Tom Clancy's Ghost Recon 2
- Tom Clancy's Ghost Recon: Jungle Storm
- Tom Clancy's Ghost Recon Advanced Warfighter
- Tom Clancy's Rainbow Six 3
- Tom Clancy's Splinter Cell
- Tom Clancy's Splinter Cell: Pandora Tomorrow
- Tom Clancy's Splinter Cell: Chaos Theory
- Tomb Raider: The Angel of Darkness
- Tomb Raider: Legend
- Tony Hawk's American Wasteland
- Tony Hawk's Pro Skater 3
- Tony Hawk's Pro Skater 4
- Tony Hawk's Project 8
- Tony Hawk's Proving Ground
- Tony Hawk's Underground
- Tony Hawk's Underground 2
- Tourist Trophy
- Transformers: The Game
- True Crime: Streets of LA
- Twisted Metal: Black
- Ty the Tasmanian Tiger
- Ultimate Spider-Man
- The Urbz: Sims in the City
- Valkyrie Profile 2: Silmeria
- Virtua Fighter 4
- Virtua Fighter 4: Evolution
- Wallace and Gromit: The Curse of the Were-Rabbit
- Wallace and Gromit in Project Zoo
- The Warriors
- We Love Katamari
- World Championship Poker
- World Championship Poker 2
- World Series of Poker
- WWE SmackDown! vs. Raw
- WWE SmackDown! vs. Raw 2006
- WWE SmackDown vs. Raw 2007
- WWE SmackDown vs. Raw 2008
- WWE SmackDown vs. Raw 2009
- WWE SmackDown vs. Raw 2010
- WWE SmackDown vs. Raw 2011
- WWF SmackDown! Just Bring It
- WWE SmackDown! Shut Your Mouth
- WWE SmackDown! Here Comes the Pain
- Xenosaga Episode I: Der Wille zur Macht
- X-Men Legends
- X-Men Legends II: Rise of Apocalypse
- Yu-Gi-Oh! The Duelists of the Roses

=== PlayStation Portable ===
The following titles have been released on the Greatest Hits label for PlayStation Portable.

- 300: March to Glory
- Assassin's Creed: Bloodlines
- Ape Escape: On the Loose
- ATV Offroad Fury: Blazin' Trails
- Burnout Legends
- Cars
- Castlevania: The Dracula X Chronicles
- Coded Arms
- Crisis Core: Final Fantasy VII
- Daxter
- Dissidia: Final Fantasy
- Dragon Ball Z: Shin Budokai
- Fight Night Round 3
- Final Fantasy Tactics: The War of the Lions
- God of War: Chains of Olympus
- Gran Turismo
- Grand Theft Auto: Chinatown Wars
- Grand Theft Auto: Liberty City Stories
- Grand Theft Auto: Vice City Stories
- Hot Shots Golf: Open Tee
- Iron Man
- Killzone: Liberation
- Lego Star Wars II: The Original Trilogy
- Lego Indiana Jones: The Original Adventures
- Lego Batman: The Videogame
- LittleBigPlanet
- Lumines: Puzzle Fusion
- Marvel: Ultimate Alliance
- Medal of Honor: Heroes
- Medal of Honor: Heroes 2
- Metal Gear Solid: Peace Walker
- Metal Gear Solid: Portable Ops
- Midnight Club 3: DUB Edition
- Midnight Club: L.A. Remix
- Mortal Kombat: Unchained
- MX vs. ATV: Untamed
- Namco Museum Battle Collection
- Naruto: Ultimate Ninja Heroes
- Need for Speed Carbon: Own the City
- Need for Speed: Most Wanted 5–1–0
- Need for Speed: ProStreet
- Need for Speed Underground: Rivals
- Patapon
- Ratchet & Clank: Size Matters
- Resistance: Retribution
- Ridge Racer
- Scarface: Money. Power. Respect.
- Secret Agent Clank
- The Simpsons Game
- SOCOM U.S. Navy SEALs: Fireteam Bravo
- SOCOM U.S. Navy SEALs: Fireteam Bravo 2
- SOCOM U.S. Navy SEALs: Tactical Strike
- Sonic Rivals
- Sonic Rivals 2
- SpongeBob SquarePants: The Yellow Avenger
- Star Wars Battlefront: Elite Squadron
- Star Wars: Battlefront II
- Star Wars Battlefront: Renegade Squadron
- Star Wars: The Force Unleashed
- Syphon Filter: Dark Mirror
- Tekken 5: Dark Resurrection
- Thrillville
- Thrillville: Off the Rails
- Tom Clancy's Ghost Recon Advanced Warfighter 2
- Tom Clancy's Rainbow Six: Vegas
- Tony Hawk's Underground 2 Remix
- Tony Hawk's Project 8
- Transformers: The Game
- Twisted Metal: Head-On
- Untold Legends: Brotherhood of the Blade
- Wipeout Pure
- WWE SmackDown! vs. Raw 2006
- WWE SmackDown vs. Raw 2007
- WWE SmackDown vs. Raw 2008
- WWE SmackDown vs. Raw 2009
- WWE SmackDown vs. Raw 2010
- WWE SmackDown vs. Raw 2011

=== PlayStation 3 ===
The following titles have been released on the Greatest Hits label for PlayStation 3.

- Army of Two
- Army of Two: The 40th Day (Europe Only)
- Assassin's Creed
- Assassin's Creed II
- Assassin's Creed: Brotherhood
- Assassin's Creed: Revelations
- Assassin's Creed III
- Assassin's Creed: Rogue
- Batman Arkham Asylum: Game of the Year Edition
- Batman Arkham City: Game of the Year Edition
- Batman Arkham City + Batman Arkham Asylum Dual Package
- Battlefield 3
- Battlefield 4
- Battlefield: Bad Company
- Battlefield: Bad Company 2
- BioShock
- BioShock 2
- BioShock Infinite
- Borderlands
- Borderlands 2
- Burnout Paradise
- Call of Duty 3
- Call of Duty 4: Modern Warfare
- Call of Duty: Black Ops
- Call of Duty: Black Ops II
- Call of Duty: Modern Warfare 2
- Call of Duty: World at War
- Civilization Revolution
- Crysis 2
- Dark Souls
- Dark Souls II
- Dead Rising 2
- Dead Space
- Dead Space 2
- Dead Space 3
- Dead Island
- Demon's Souls
- Devil May Cry 4
- Dishonored
- The Elder Scrolls IV: Oblivion
- The Elder Scrolls V: Skyrim
- Fallout 3
- Fallout New Vegas: Ultimate Edition
- Far Cry 3
- Far Cry 4
- Fight Night Champion
- Fight Night Round 3
- Fight Night Round 4
- Final Fantasy XIII
- God of War Collection
- God of War III
- Gran Turismo 5: Prologue
- Grand Theft Auto IV
- Grand Theft Auto IV: The Complete Edition
- Grand Theft Auto V
- Grand Theft Auto: San Andreas
- Heavenly Sword
- Heavy Rain
- Hitman: Absolution
- Infamous
- Injustice: Gods Among Us Ultimate Edition
- Killzone 2
- Killzone 3
- Kingdom Hearts HD 1.5 Remix
- Kingdom Hearts HD 2.5 Remix
- Kingdoms of Amalur: Reckoning
- L.A. Noire
- Lego Batman 2: DC Superheroes
- Lego Batman 3: Beyond Gotham
- Lego Harry Potter: Years 1–4
- Lego Indiana Jones: The Original Adventures
- Lego Indiana Jones 2: The Adventure Continues
- Lego The Lord of the Rings: The Video Game
- Lego Marvel Super Heroes
- Lego Star Wars III: The Clone Wars
- Lego Star Wars: The Complete Saga
- LittleBigPlanet: Game of the Year Edition
- Mafia II
- MAG
- Max Payne 3
- Medal of Honor
- Medal of Honor: Warfighter
- Metal Gear Solid 4: Guns of the Patriots
- Midnight Club: Los Angeles Complete Edition
- Mortal Kombat: Komplete Edition
- Mortal Kombat vs. DC Universe
- MotorStorm
- MotorStorm: Apocalypse
- Naruto Shippuden: Ultimate Ninja Storm 3
- Need for Speed: Carbon
- Need for Speed: Hot Pursuit
- Need for Speed: Most Wanted
- Need for Speed: ProStreet
- Need for Speed: Rivals
- Need for Speed: Shift
- Need for Speed: The Run
- Need for Speed: Undercover
- Ninja Gaiden: Sigma
- Ni No Kuni: Wrath of the White Witch
- Portal 2
- Prince of Persia
- Pro Evolution Soccer 2013
- Rage
- Ratchet & Clank Future: A Crack in Time
- Ratchet & Clank Future: Tools of Destruction
- Red Dead Redemption
- Red Dead Redemption: Game of the Year Edition
- Resident Evil 5
- Resident Evil 5: Gold Edition
- Resident Evil 6
- Resident Evil: Operation Raccoon City
- Resistance Dual Pack
- Resistance: Fall of Man
- Resistance 2
- Saints Row 2
- Saints Row: The Third
- Saints Row IV
- Shift 2: Unleashed
- The Sims 3
- Skate 3
- Sniper: Ghost Warrior
- SOCOM U.S. Navy SEALs: Confrontation
- SOCOM 4 U.S. Navy SEALs
- Sonic Generations
- Sonic's Ultimate Genesis Collection
- Soulcalibur IV
- Soulcalibur V
- South Park: The Stick of Truth
- Star Wars: The Force Unleashed
- Star Wars: The Force Unleashed II
- Street Fighter IV
- Super Street Fighter IV
- Street Fighter X Tekken
- Tekken 6
- Tomb Raider
- Tom Clancy's Ghost Recon Future Soldier
- Tom Clancy's Splinter Cell: Blacklist
- Tom Clancy's Rainbow Six: Vegas
- Tom Clancy's Rainbow Six: Vegas 2
- UFC 2009 Undisputed
- UFC Undisputed 3
- Uncharted: Drake's Fortune
- Uncharted Dual Pack
- Uncharted 2: Among Thieves
- Virtua Fighter 5
- Warhawk
- Watch Dogs
- WWE SmackDown vs. Raw 2009
- WWE SmackDown vs. Raw 2010
- WWE 12

=== PlayStation 4 ===
==== PlayStation Hits titles for North America, Europe, Oceania, and Asia ====
- Assassin's Creed IV: Black Flag (Europe & Asia Only)
- Assassin's Creed: Syndicate Special Edition (Asia Only)
- Assassin's Creed: The Ezio Collection (Asia Only)
- Assassin's Creed: Unity (Asia Only)
- Batman: Arkham Knight
- Battlefield 1
- Battlefield 4
- Battlefield Hardline
- Bloodborne
- Crash Bandicoot: N. Sane Trilogy
- Crash Bandicoot 4: It's About Time
- Crash Team Racing: Nitro-Fueled
- The Crew
- Death Stranding
- Destiny - The Collection (Asia Only)
- Devil May Cry 4 Special Edition (Asia Only)
- Disgaea 5 (Asia Only)
- DOOM
- Dragon Age: Inquisition
- Dragon Ball Xenoverse
- Dragon Ball Xenoverse 2 (Europe Only)
- Dragon Quest Builders (Asia Only)
- Dragon Quest Heroes II (Asia Only)
- Dragon Quest Heroes: The World Tree's Woe and the Blight Below
- Dreams
- Driveclub
- Dying Light: The Following - Enhanced Edition
- Dynasty Warriors 8: Xtreme Legends Complete Edition
- Dynasty Warriors 9
- EA Sports UFC 2
- EA Sports UFC 3
- Earth Defense Force 4.1: The Shadow of New Despair
- Everybody's Golf (Asia Only)
- The Evil Within (Asia Only)
- F1 2015 (Asia Only)
- Far Cry 4
- Far Cry: Primal (Asia Only)
- Final Fantasy Type-0 HD (Asia Only)
- Final Fantasy X/X-2 HD Remaster (Asia Only)
- Fist of the North Star: Lost Paradise
- Friday the 13th: The Game
- Gallian Chronicles Remaster (Asia Only)
- God of War III Remastered
- God of War
- Gran Turismo Sport
- Gravity Rush 2 (Asia Only)
- Gravity Rush Remastered (Asia Only)
- Horizon Zero Dawn: Complete Edition
- inFAMOUS: First Light (Asia Only)
- inFAMOUS : Second Son
- Injustice: Gods Among Us - Ultimate Edition
- Injustice 2
- Just Dance 2014 (Asia Only)
- Just Dance 2015 (Asia Only)
- Just Dance 2016 (Asia Only)
- Just Dance 2017 (Asia Only)
- Killzone: Shadow Fall
- Knack (Asia Only)
- Knack 2 (Asia Only)
- The Last Guardian (Asia Only)
- The Last of Us Remastered
- LEGO Jurassic World
- LEGO Marvel Super Heroes
- LEGO Worlds
- LittleBigPlanet 3
- Mad Max (Europe Only)
- Metal Gear Solid V: The Definitive Experience
- Middle-earth: Shadow of Mordor - Game of the Year Edition
- Monster Hunter: World
- Mortal Kombat X
- Naruto Shippuden: Ultimate Ninja Storm 4 (Europe Only)
- Need for Speed
- Need for Speed Payback
- Need for Speed Rivals
- Nioh
- One Piece: Pirate Warriors 3 (Europe Only)
- The Order: 1886 (Asia Only)
- Persona 5
- Plants vs. Zombies: Garden Warfare 2
- Project CARS
- Ratchet & Clank
- Rayman Legends
- Resident Evil 6
- Resident Evil 7: Biohazard
- Sengoku Basara 4: Sumeragi (Asia Only)
- Sleeping Dogs Definitive Edition (Asia Only)
- Spyro Reignited Trilogy
- Star Wars Battlefront
- Star Wars Battlefront II
- Street Fighter V
- Tales of Berseria
- Tearaway Unfolded (Asia Only)
- Terraria
- The Last of Us Remastered
- Tom Clancy's Rainbow Six: Siege (Asia Only)
- Tom Clancy's The Division
- Tomb Raider: Definitive Edition (Asia Only)
- Uncharted: The Nathan Drake Collection
- Uncharted 4: A Thief's End
- Uncharted: The Lost Legacy
- Until Dawn
- Watch Dogs (Europe & Asia Only)
- Watch Dogs Complete Edition (Europe & Asia Only)
- World Soccer Winning Eleven 2015 (Asia Only)
- World Soccer Winning Eleven 2017 (Asia Only)
- Yakuza 0
- Yakuza Kiwami
- Yakuza Kiwami 2
- Yakuza 6: The Song of Life

==== PlayStation Hits titles for the PAL region ====
- Assassin's Creed IV: Black Flag
- Batman: Arkham Knight
- Bloodborne
- Dishonored 2
- Doom
- Dragon Ball Xenoverse
- Dragon Ball Xenoverse 2
- DriveClub
- Dynasty Warriors 8: Xtreme Legends Complete Edition
- Dynasty Warriors 9
- Earth Defense Force 4.1: The Shadow of New Despair
- Fallout 4
- Fist of the North Star: Lost Paradise
- God of War
- God of War III Remastered
- Gran Turismo Sport
- Gundam Versus
- Horizon Zero Dawn
- Horizon Zero Dawn: Complete Edition
- inFamous: Second Son
- Injustice 2
- Killzone: Shadow Fall
- LEGO Batman 3: Beyond Gotham
- LittleBigPlanet 3
- Mad Max
- Metal Gear Solid V: The Definitive Experience
- Middle-earth: Shadow of Mordor
- Monster Hunter: World
- Mortal Kombat X
- Naruto Shippuden: Ultimate Ninja Storm 4
- Need for Speed
- Need for Speed Payback
- Need for Speed Rivals
- Nioh
- One Piece: Pirate Warriors 3
- Plants vs. Zombies: Garden Warfare 2
- Project Cars
- Ratchet & Clank
- Rayman Legends
- Resident Evil 6
- Resident Evil VII: Biohazard
- Street Fighter V
- Tales of Berseria
- Terraria
- The Evil Within
- The Last of Us Remastered
- UFC 2
- Uncharted 4: A Thief's End
- Uncharted: The Lost Legacy
- Uncharted: The Nathan Drake Collection
- Until Dawn
- Watch Dogs
- Wolfenstein: The New Order
- Yakuza 0
- Yakuza Kiwami 2
- Yakuza 6: The Song of Life

== See also ==
- Sega All Stars
- Nintendo Selects
- Xbox Platinum Hits
