= Rogue Trip: Vacation 2012 =

1998 video game

- Developer: SingleTrac
- Publisher: GT Interactive
- Director: Kellan Hatch
- Producer: Scott Campbell
- Designers: Scott Campbell; Kellan Hatch
- Programmer: Steve Poulson
- Artist: Owen Richardson
- Composers: Chuck E. Myers; Tom Hopkins
- Platform: PlayStation
- Release: NA: October 6, 1998; EU: November 1998
- Genre: Vehicular combat
- Modes: Single-player, multiplayer

Rogue Trip: Vacation 2012, also known as Rogue Trip, is a vehicular combat video game developed by SingleTrac and published by GT Interactive for the PlayStation in 1998. The game is set in an apocalyptic fiction alternative history version of the year 2012 where mercenaries fight against each other using vehicles, and various weapons as they pick up tourists, hitchhikers, and passengers paying them fares for bringing them to vacation destinations around the remnants of the destroyed United States, and these mercenaries call themselves "auto mercenaries".

SingleTrac found prior success in developing games for publisher Sony Computer Entertainment in the early years of the PlayStation's life cycle, including the vehicular combat series Twisted Metal. Following a contractual dispute with Sony, the developer was bought by GT Interactive and Rogue Trip was produced as part of an agreement with its new publisher. Rogue Trip utilizes an overhauled version of the game engine of the first two Twisted Metal titles, sharing many of their design elements. The player controls a vehicle in third-person perspective on a 3D map and is tasked with eliminating all other opponents by using ballistic projectiles, bombs, and other weaponry. The game further features a secondary objective in which the player competes in picking up a tourist for photo ops of landmarks found throughout each level. These provide money that can be used for power-ups like weapon upgrades and health refills.

Review publications heavily compared and contrasted Rogue Trip with SingleTrac's past Twisted Metal games and the 1998 PlayStation vehicular combat titles Vigilante 8 and Twisted Metal III. Reception for Rogue Trip has been mostly positive. Critics praised the familiar gameplay, play control, and level design, but had mixed opinions on its sound design and music. Impressions of the game's graphics somewhat varied too, but have generally been considered inferior to other releases of the era.

== Gameplay ==
The player takes a tourist to a photo op. The head-up display shows the player's weapons, cash, tourist passenger, and both a map and message with remaining enemies.

Rogue Trip: Vacation 2012 shares many gameplay elements with other titles in the vehicular combat genre, specifically the Twisted Metal franchise. The game's main single-player mode has the player take control of one of 11 initially available vehicles in order to complete a linear series of stages. The primary objective of every mission is to eliminate a number of computer-controlled enemies using various weapons to deplete their health meters. Each self-contained stage is presented in a 3D third-person perspective and can be freely roamed alongside all other drivers. Stages are littered with power-ups including expendable weapons, "Turbos" for increasing a vehicle's speed, and cash used to purchase health and weapon upgrades. Every vehicle differs in size, durability, and maneuverability, each possessing a unique "Special" weapon that automatically replenishes over time and a standard machine gun with unlimited ammunition. Expendable weapons can be acquired out in the open at certain points of a stage, uncovered by destroying parts of the environment, or found in hidden areas. These weapons include, among others, homing "Stinger" projectiles, remotely activated "RLB" bombs, and "Prowler" missiles that the player can directly control once fired. Money can be spent during combat by driving into "Upgrade Stands" for increasing the strength of weapons or "Repair Stands" for refilling the player's health. Every time a player's vehicle is destroyed, a chance is reduced and a game over results when they run out of chances. Extra ones can be obtained by completing a stage with $30,000. Boss characters must be fought at the completion of certain missions and three bonus stages can be visited and unlocked to obtain more cash.

A secondary gameplay objective comes in the form of tourists. The player can compete with enemy drivers to pick up a single tourist that is up for grabs at the beginning of each level. Taking on the tourist will provide the player with a steady influx of fare. Each map contains six photo ops, landmarks at which the player can park and allow the tourist to briefly observe at specific angles while in the midst of combat. The more photo ops that are completed the more cash is awarded at the completion of a stage. In addition to regular weapons, the "Ejeculator" can be used that causes the target to instantly set the tourist loose once again. The game features another single-player game mode which lacks any tourists, as well as multiplayer modes that allow players to compete with one another in deathmatches or attempt the game's main campaign cooperatively. Multiplayer options consist of using a two-player split screen view on a single console or utilizing the PlayStation Link Cable to allow up to four players simultaneously.

== Plot ==
With Earth entirely in ruins from devastation by apocalyptic mass destruction, an underground economy is around for tourism of various vacation locales around the destroyed United States. This economy is largely controlled by the bloodthirsty sadist "Big Daddy" and shaped in an image resembling him. And only wealthy people can afford these expensive resort prices, so an organization called the "A.A.A" (which stands "Amalgamated Association of Auto-mercenaries") is established to sneak tourists into these sites for discounted photo ops. The playable characters join the A.A.A. and controls one of several mercenary drivers controlling a heavily armed ground combat vehicle fighting opponents to earn cash from tourists they pick up, bringing them to these photo ops, and on unauthorized vacations.

== Development and release ==
Rogue Trip: Vacation 2012 was developed by SingleTrac. The company had previously developed a string of critically and commercially successful PlayStation titles for publisher Sony Computer Entertainment during the early years of the console's life, including the vehicular combat games Twisted Metal and Twisted Metal 2. Following the release of Twisted Metal 2, SingleTrac entered into a contractual dispute with Sony when the developer's employees argued they were not receiving adequate financial rewards from Sony for their work. This led to the exit of key members like Scott Campbell and Kellan Hatch. SingleTrac was subsequently purchased by GT Interactive in mid-1997 and agreed to a three-to-four game development deal. Because Sony retained the rights to the Twisted Metal franchise, SingleTrac created Rogue Trip as a spiritual successor to those games. Rogue Trip was primarily designed by Campbell and Hatch, who additionally served as the game's producer and creative director respectively. The two created a roster of imaginative characters and personalities, which were then handed off to software development lead Steve Poulson to be implemented into the game via stunts and gameplay mechanics. The ska-inspired soundtrack for Rogue Trip was composed and produced by a team made up of Chuck E. Meyers and Tom Hopkins, both of whom had worked on the musical scores of SingleTrac games during the company's partnership with Sony. In addition to some original music, GT Interactive signed a deal with Mercury Records to feature the songs "The Rascal King" by The Mighty Mighty Bosstones and "Snake Eyes" by Nashville Pussy.

Rogue Trip shares the same game engine technology as the SingleTrac-developed Twisted Metal titles, with several enhancements. Campbell stated that the team optimized their code to gain 35% to 40% more processing power and memory savings and spread this across primary components like graphics, computer artificial intelligence (AI), and gameplay. First, a particle system was added to the give the player what Campbell described as an "awesome graphical payoff" when taking out opponents or parts of the environment. Second, the game's AI was revised so that a computer combatant "learns from the player" and will react and adjust more similarly to a human opponent. Third, a "Dynamic Interactive Fodder" system was constructed to increase the destructibility of environments and generate more objects with which the player could destroy, use as weapons, or take damage. These include blimps, fuel trucks, jets, and helicopters. Finally, the performance boost allowed for more realistic vehicle physics and movement, as well as added terrain topography for larger, more detailed levels.

GT Interactive announced Rogue Trip in April 1998. The game was showcased at the Electronic Entertainment Expo in late May alongside Streak: Hoverboard Racing, another PlayStation-exclusive from SingleTrac. The alpha phase of the game's development was completed around mid-July of that same year. One month later, its beta phase was finished ahead of schedule, allowing the publisher to gain US release approval in August. Rogue Trip was officially released in North America on October 6, 1998 and in European territories that November. GT Interactive backed its launch with a multi-million dollar marketing campaign comprising a television spot, online and print advertisements, and cross-promotions with apparel companies.

== Reception ==
Reception

Aggregate score
Aggregator	Score
GameRankings	78%

Review scores
Publication	Score
AllGame	4/5
CNET Gamecenter	8/10
Computer and Video Games	3/5
Electronic Gaming Monthly	8.625/10
Game Informer	9/10
GameFan	84% (Note: Three critics of GameFan gave the game each a score of 87, 86, and 78.)
GameRevolution	B+
GameSpot	7.5/10
IGN	7.9/10
Next Generation	3/5
Official U.S. PlayStation Magazine	3.5/5

The game received favorable reviews according to the review aggregation website GameRankings. Reviewers extensively compared and contrasted the game with SingleTrac's previous efforts Twisted Metal and Twisted Metal 2, as well as two other 1998 vehicular combat games for the PlayStation: Vigilante 8, published by Activision; and Twisted Metal III, published by Sony. Publications like Official U.S. PlayStation Magazine (OPM), Electronic Gaming Monthly (EGM), and GameFan even featured side-by-side reviews or comparison articles in some issues. GamePro called the game "Twisted Metal with tourists. However, if you're looking for more than just driving and shooting in your driving and shooting games, Rogue's worth a Trip." (Note: GamePro gave the game 3.5/5 for graphics, two 4/5 scores for sound and fun factor, and 4.5/5 for control.)

Gameplay, play control, and level design in Rogue Trip were mostly praised. Shawn Smith of EGM, Duke Ferris of GameRevolution, Craig Harris of IGN, OPM, and editors for both GameFan and Game Informer all had positive comments concerning the gameplay and vehicle mechanics. EGM awarded it "Monthly Editor's Choice" award for November 1998, with Smith stating "Rogue Trip delivers all the car-blasting action I'd want." When considering this game, rather than Twisted Metal III, as a follow-up to SingleTrac's Twisted Metal 2, the magazine summarized, "Rogue Trip's bigger, quirkier arenas, complete multiplayer package, arcade control and crazy secrets pin it as the true heir." Andy McNamara, Paul Anderson, and Andrew Reiner of Game Informer fully embraced its likeness to the developer's past release, concluding that it "exudes the fantastic scent of TM2" in terms of vehicle physics, art style, level design, and humor. Ferris was pleasantly surprised by the game's high replay value in spite of its utter similarities to Twisted Metal 2. GameFan and Ed Lomas of Computer and Video Games each complimented the gameplay as being familiar to that of the Twisted Metal series yet lacked innovation or originality. However, Harris pointed out the tourist objective as a "welcome" inclusion to its formulaic vehicular combat and that its two-player modes were "enough to get the game". Steven Garrett of GameSpot believed that, despite having more levels and a tougher difficulty, the overall gameplay was edged out by Vigilante 8. He further saw the "hilly terrain" of stages in Rogue Trip to be an improvement over the flatter locations of Twisted Metal 2, but that this could obscure a player's vision in split-screen multiplayer modes. Ferris considered the game's environments to be the largest advantage over Twisted Metal 2, with each one "full of interesting twists and turns, lots of things to destroy, and even a secret or two if you pay attention".

Attitudes towards the graphics of Rogue Trip were slightly mixed, though reviewers generally considered them to be less representative of what the PlayStation was capable of when compared to the other releases of 1998. OPM plainly emphasized that the game's graphics were one of its biggest shortcomings, whereas Ferris called the visuals "dated" and expected more after playing Vigilante 8. Next Generation similarly wrote that the graphics "simply don't compare" to those of Vigilante 8, while Harris declared that they "don't measure up" to Twisted Metal III. GameFan also treated Vigilante 8 as superior in this regard, but labeled this correlation between Rogue Trip and Twisted Metal III a "toss-up". Alternatively, Reiner found the textures in Rogue Trip to be "no longer washed out" and the effects "ten times as impressive" than those of Twisted Metal 2. Garrett criticized the art style and character designs of Rogue Trip as "an imperfect Bizarro-style duplicate", though he too rated the graphics themselves as more advanced than Twisted Metal 2.

The game's music and audio design were met with varied opinions. Ferris asserted the sound as "just fine, with growling engines, satisfying crashes and the ever-popular explosion". Ferris and Harris concluded that the music was initially tolerable then repetitive, the latter writer elaborating: "The Bosstones soundtrack, while fine the first time you sit through it, really gets on your nerves, since missions can last five times longer than the CD track." The editors of GameFan thought that the inclusion of such bands was novel but a pleasant surprise only for fans of this music style. They further stated that the volume of the songs often drowns out all of the game's sound effects.

Sales figures for Rogue Trip are unknown. Publisher GT Interactive claimed that the game did contribute significantly to its fiscal revenue during the release period, despite an overall loss during the quarter. There were various, unofficial reports that a sequel to the game was in development by SingleTrac between 1999 and 2000. However, nothing concrete was ever made public and many key members of the company, such as producer and designer Scott Campbell, left the company in late 1999 to form Incognito Entertainment. Former SingleTrac employee Jay Barnson told PC World that he was unaware of any plans for a sequel and that GT Interactive never disclosed to the development team how well its projects Rogue Trip or Critical Depth had sold: "Maybe they both sold very well and they never told us, but it sure seemed like management wasn't enthusiastic about sales."
