= List of best-selling PlayStation video games =

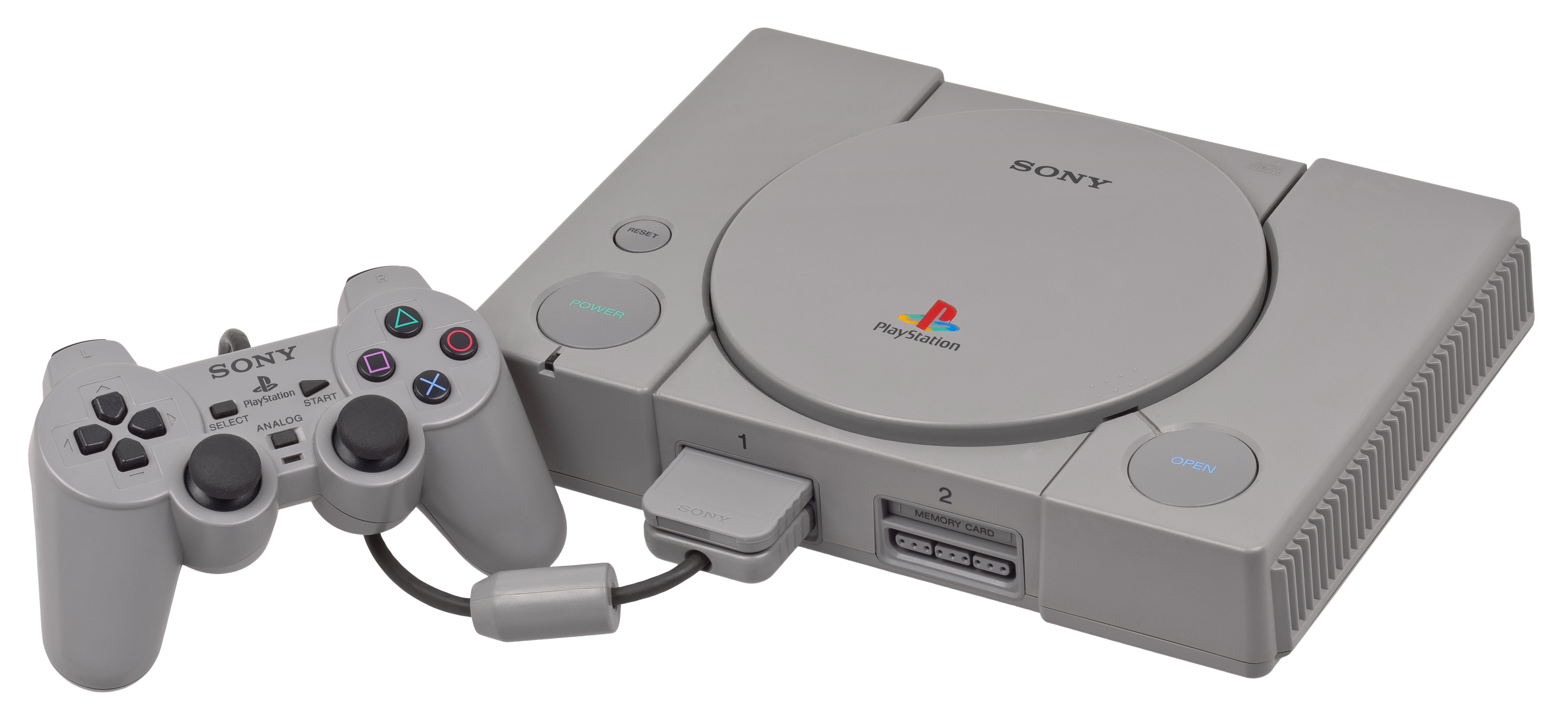
Original PlayStation with DualShock controller

This is a list of video games for the original PlayStation video game console that have sold or shipped at least one million copies. The best-selling game on the PlayStation is Gran Turismo. A sim racing game developed by Polyphony Digital, Gran Turismo was originally released in Japan on December 23, 1997, and went on to sell 10.85 million units worldwide. The second-best-selling game on the console is Final Fantasy VII (1997), which sold over 10 million units. (Note: Final Fantasy VII (PlayStation): Worldwide sales as of 2005 – 9.8 million; Japan sales during 2006–2007 – 222,228; The Best – 158,458 (in 2006); Ultimate Hits – 63,770 (during 2006–2007)) The top five is rounded out by Gran Turismo 2 (1999) with 9.37 million units sold, Final Fantasy VIII (1999) selling 8.6 million units, and Tekken 3 (1998) with 8.3 million units sold.

There are a total of 127 PlayStation games on this list which are confirmed to have sold or shipped at least one million units. Of these, 49 were published in one or more regions by Sony Computer Entertainment. Other publishers with multiple million-selling games include Namco with twelve games, Square with ten games, Eidos Interactive with eight games, Konami and Electronic Arts with seven games each, and Capcom with six games. The developers with the most million-selling games include Namco with eleven games, Square with ten games, Konami and Sony Computer Entertainment with seven games each, and Capcom with six games. The most popular franchises on the PlayStation include Crash Bandicoot (27.43 million combined units), Final Fantasy (26.39 million combined units), Tomb Raider (25.9 million combined units), Gran Turismo (20.22 million combined units), and Tekken (15.73 million combined units). The oldest game on this list is Ridge Racer, first released on the platform on December 3, 1994, while the most recent is Dancing Stage Party Edition, released on November 15, 2002, when the PlayStation 2 had been out for more than two years.

As of March 2007, a total of 962 million copies of PlayStation software had been shipped worldwide.

== List ==
Game	Developer(s)	Publisher(s)	Release date (Note: Only the initial release date on this platform is listed.)	Sales	Ref.
Gran Turismo	Polyphony Digital	Sony Computer Entertainment	December 23, 1997	10,850,000	
Final Fantasy VII	Square	JP: Square; WW: Sony Computer Entertainment	January 31, 1997	10,022,228	
Gran Turismo 2	Polyphony Digital	Sony Computer Entertainment	December 11, 1999	9,370,000	
Final Fantasy VIII	Square	JP/PAL: Square; NA: Square Electronic Arts	February 11, 1999	8,600,000	
Tekken 3	Namco	JP/NA: Namco; EU: Sony Computer Entertainment	March 26, 1998	8,300,000	
Harry Potter and the Philosopher's Stone	Argonaut Games	Electronic Arts	November 15, 2001	8,000,000	
Crash Bandicoot 2: Cortex Strikes Back	Naughty Dog	Sony Computer Entertainment	November 5, 1997	7,580,000	(Note: Crash Bandicoot 2: Cortex Strikes Back: United States – 3.87 million; Japan – 1.3 million)
Crash Bandicoot: Warped	Naughty Dog	Sony Computer Entertainment	October 31, 1998	7,130,000	
Tomb Raider	Core Design	Eidos Interactive	October 25, 1996	7,100,000	
Metal Gear Solid	Konami Computer Entertainment Japan	Konami	September 3, 1998	7,000,000	
Crash Bandicoot	Naughty Dog	Sony Computer Entertainment	September 9, 1996	6,820,000	
Tomb Raider II	Core Design	Eidos Interactive	October 31, 1997	6,800,000	
Tomb Raider III	Core Design	Eidos Interactive	November 20, 1998	5,900,000	
Resident Evil 2	Capcom	JP/NA: Capcom; PAL: Virgin Interactive	January 21, 1998	5,770,000 (Note: Including Dual Shock Ver.)	(Note: Resident Evil 2 (PlayStation) sales breakdown: Resident Evil 2 – 4.96 million; Dual Shock Ver. – 810,000)
Tekken 2	Namco	JP/NA: Namco; EU: Sony Computer Entertainment	March 29, 1996	5,700,000	
Final Fantasy IX	Square	JP/PAL: Square; NA: Square Electronic Arts	July 7, 2000	5,500,000	
Resident Evil	Capcom	JP/NA: Capcom; PAL: Virgin Interactive	March 22, 1996	5,080,000 (Note: Including Director's Cut and Dual Shock Ver.)	
Spyro the Dragon	Insomniac Games	Sony Computer Entertainment	September 9, 1998	4,832,145	
Crash Team Racing	Naughty Dog	Sony Computer Entertainment	October 19, 1999	4,790,000	
Oddworld: Abe's Oddysee	Oddworld Inhabitants	WW: GT Interactive; JP: SoftBank	September 19, 1997	3,500,000	
Tomb Raider: The Last Revelation	Core Design	Eidos Interactive	November 15, 1999	4,700,000	
Dragon Quest VII	Heartbeat	Enix	August 26, 2000	4,110,000	
Rayman	Ubisoft Montpellier	Ubi Soft	September 1, 1995	4,000,000	
Tony Hawk's Pro Skater	Neversoft	Activision	August 31, 1999	3,500,000	
Resident Evil 3: Nemesis	Capcom	JP/NA: Capcom; PAL: Eidos Interactive	September 22, 1999	3,500,000	
Spyro 2: Ripto's Rage	Insomniac Games; Cerny Games	Sony Computer Entertainment	November 2, 1999	3,451,064	
Frogger	Millennium Interactive	Hasbro Interactive	September 30, 1997	3,370,000	
Spyro: Year of the Dragon	Insomniac Games	Sony Computer Entertainment	October 24, 2000	3,283,077	
Driver	Reflections Interactive	GT Interactive	June 30, 1999	3,220,000	
007: Tomorrow Never Dies	Black Ops Entertainment	Electronic Arts; MGM Interactive	November 16, 1999	3,200,000	
Tony Hawk's Pro Skater 2	Neversoft	Activision	September 20, 2000	3,150,000	
Croc: Legend of the Gobbos	Argonaut Software	WW: Fox Interactive; JP: MediaQuest	September 29, 1997	3,000,000	
Driver 2	Reflections Interactive	Infogrames	November 13, 2000	2,850,000	
Yu-Gi-Oh! Forbidden Memories	Konami Computer Entertainment Japan	Konami	December 9, 1999	2,510,804	(Note: Yu-Gi-Oh! Forbidden Memories: United States and Europe – 2 million; Japan – 510,804)
Dino Crisis	Capcom Production Studio 4	WW: Capcom; PAL: Virgin Interactive	July 1, 1999	2,400,000	
Namco Museum Vol. 3	Namco	Namco; Sony Computer Entertainment	June 21, 1996	2,388,758	(Note: Namco Museum Vol. 3: United States – 2.24 million; Japan – 148,758)
Everybody's Golf (Note: Known as Hot Shots Golf in North America.)	Camelot Software Planning	Sony Computer Entertainment	July 17, 1997	2,359,511	(Note: Everybody's Golf / Hot Shots Golf: Japan – 2.13 million; United States – 229,511)
Final Fantasy Tactics	Square	JP: Square; NA: Sony Computer Entertainment	June 20, 1997	2,270,000	
Air Combat	Namco	Namco	June 30, 1995	2,230,000	
WWF War Zone	Iguana West	Acclaim Entertainment	July 14, 1998	2,200,000	
Tony Hawk's Pro Skater 3	Shaba Games	Activision	October 29, 2001	2,110,000	
Mortal Kombat Trilogy	Avalanche Software	NA: Midway Games; EU: GT Interactive; JP: SoftBank	October 10, 1996	2,010,000	
Derby Stallion	ParityBit	ASCII Corporation	July 17, 1997	2,000,000	
NFL GameDay 98	Sony Interactive Studios America	Sony Computer Entertainment	July 31, 1997	2,000,000	
Silent Hill	Konami Computer Entertainment Tokyo (Team Silent)	Konami	January 31, 1999	2,000,000	
Frogger 2: Swampy's Revenge	Blitz Games	Hasbro Interactive	September 21, 2000	2,000,000	
Parasite Eve	Square	Square	March 29, 1998	1,940,000	
WWF SmackDown!	Yuke's	WW: THQ; JP: Yuke's	March 2, 2000	1,935,759	(Note: WWF SmackDown!: United States – 1.62 million; United Kingdom – 300,000+; Japan – 15,759)
WWF SmackDown! 2: Know Your Role	Yuke's	WW: THQ; JP: Yuke's	November 21, 2000	1,915,858	(Note: WWF SmackDown 2: United States – 1.57 million; United Kingdom – 300,000+; Japan – 45,858)
Crash Bash	Eurocom Developments; Cerny Games	Sony Computer Entertainment	November 6, 2000	1,900,000	
Spider-Man	Neversoft	Activision	August 30, 2000	1,850,000	
Namco Museum Vol. 1	Namco	Namco; Sony Computer Entertainment	November 22, 1995	1,817,786	(Note: Namco Museum Vol. 1: United States – 1.65 million; Japan – 167,786)
Tetris Plus	Natsume	WW: Jaleco; EU: JVC Music Europe	September 6, 1996	1,770,000	
Syphon Filter	Eidetic	989 Studios; Sony Computer Entertainment	February 17, 1999	1,750,000	
Twisted Metal 2	SingleTrac; Sony Interactive Studios America	Sony Computer Entertainment	October 31, 1996	1,740,000	
Tekken	Namco	JP/NA: Namco; EU: Sony Computer Entertainment	March 31, 1995	1,728,556	(Note: Tekken: Japan – 942,000; United States – 786,556) (Note: Tekken was the first PlayStation game to sell over 1 million units.)
Formula 1	Bizarre Creations	Psygnosis	September 13, 1996	1,700,000	
Need for Speed III: Hot Pursuit	EA Canada	Electronic Arts	March 25, 1998	1,700,000	
PaRappa the Rapper	NanaOn-Sha	Sony Computer Entertainment	December 6, 1996	1,684,398	(Note: PaRappa the Rapper: Japan – 1.47 million; United States – 214,398)
Medal of Honor	DreamWorks Interactive	Electronic Arts	October 31, 1999	1,640,000	
Everybody's Golf 2 (Note: Known as Hot Shots Golf 2 in North America.)	Clap Hanz	Sony Computer Entertainment	July 29, 1999	1,598,482	(Note: Everybody's Golf 2 / Hot Shots Golf 2: Japan – 1.44 million; United States – 158,482)
Arc the Lad	G-Craft; Winds	Sony Computer Entertainment	June 30, 1995	1,587,253	
Madden NFL 99	EA Tiburon	EA Sports	July 31, 1998	1,500,000	
A Bug's Life	Traveller's Tales	Sony Computer Entertainment	November 18, 1998	1,500,000	
007: The World Is Not Enough	Black Ops Entertainment	Electronic Arts	November 7, 2000	1,500,000	
Legacy of Kain: Soul Reaver	Crystal Dynamics	Eidos Interactive	August 16, 1999	1,500,000	
Chrono Cross	Square	Square	November 18, 1999	1,500,000	
Madden NFL 2000	EA Tiburon	EA Sports	July 31, 1999	1,480,000	
Ridge Racer	Namco	Namco	December 3, 1994	1,468,507	(Note: Ridge Racer: Japan – 859,085; United States – 609,422 (bundled 60,958, separate 548,464))
Rugrats: Search for Reptar	n-Space	THQ	October 31, 1998	1,460,000	
Grand Theft Auto 2	DMA Design	Rockstar Games	October 25, 1999	1,450,000	
Cool Boarders 3	Idol Minds	989 Studios; Sony Computer Entertainment	September 30, 1998	1,430,000	
Syphon Filter 2	Eidetic	989 Studios; Sony Computer Entertainment	March 14, 2000	1,420,000	
Dance Dance Revolution	Konami	Konami	April 10, 1999	1,405,048	(Note: Dance Dance Revolution: Japan – 1.27 million; United States – 135,048)
Ape Escape	Japan Studio	Sony Computer Entertainment	June 22, 1999	1,400,000	
Tomb Raider: Chronicles	Core Design	Eidos Interactive	November 17, 2000	1,400,000	
Need for Speed: High Stakes	EA Canada	Electronic Arts	March 1, 1999	1,390,000	
The Legend of Dragoon	Japan Studio	Sony Computer Entertainment	December 2, 1999	1,315,240	(Note: The Legend of Dragoon: United States – 960,000; Japan – 355,240)
Pac-Man World	Namco Hometek	WW: Namco; EU: Sony Computer Entertainment	October 12, 1999	1,310,518	(Note: Pac-Man World: United States – 1,240,000; Japan – 70,518)
Jet Moto 2	SingleTrac; Sony Interactive Studios America	Sony Computer Entertainment	October 31, 1997	1,310,000	
WCW Nitro	Inland Productions	THQ	January 31, 1998	1,300,000	
Twisted Metal III	989 Studios	989 Studios; Sony Computer Entertainment	October 31, 1998	1,290,000	
Battle Arena Toshinden	Tamsoft	JP/NA: Takara; NA/EU: Sony Computer Entertainment	January 1, 1995	1,289,575	(Note: Battle Arena Toshinden: Japan – 696,851; United States – 532,724 (bundled 205,312, separate 327,412))
Jet Moto	SingleTrac; Sony Interactive Studios America	Sony Computer Entertainment	October 31, 1996	1,270,000	
Spec Ops: Stealth Patrol	Zombie Studios; Runecraft	Take-Two Interactive; TalonSoft	June 5, 2000	1,270,000	
Madden NFL 98	Tiburon Entertainment	EA Sports	July 31, 1997	1,250,000	
Dragon Quest IV	Heartbeat	Enix	November 22, 2001	1,232,071	
Tenchu: Stealth Assassins	Acquire	JP: Sony Music Entertainment Japan; WW: Activision	February 26, 1998	1,230,675	(Note: Tenchu: Stealth Assassins: United States – 730,675; Japan – 500,000+)
SaGa Frontier	Square	JP: Square; NA: Sony Computer Entertainment	July 11, 1997	1,213,124	(Note: SaGa Frontier: Japan – 1,095,226; United States – 117,898)
Cool Boarders 2	UEP Systems	JP: UEP Systems; NA/EU: Sony Computer Entertainment	August 28, 1997	1,210,000	
Xenogears	Square	Square	February 11, 1998	1,209,479	(Note: Xenogears sales breakdown: Japan – 929,479; Overseas – 280,000)
Dino Crisis 2	Capcom	WW: Capcom; EU: Virgin Interactive	September 13, 2000	1,200,000	
Monopoly	Gremlin Interactive	Hasbro Interactive	November 6, 1997	1,190,000	
Arc the Lad II	ARC Entertainment	Sony Computer Entertainment	November 11, 1996	1,183,995	
Metal Gear Solid: VR Missions	Konami Computer Entertainment Japan	Konami	September 30, 1999	1,180,000	
Chocobo's Mysterious Dungeon	Square; Digital Media Lab	Square	December 22, 1997	1,165,796	
Ace Combat 3: Electrosphere	Namco	Namco	May 27, 1999	1,164,000	
NASCAR 98	Stormfront Studios	EA Sports	November 17, 1997	1,160,000	
NBA Live 98	EA Canada	EA Sports	November 30, 1997	1,150,000	
Devil Dice	Shift	JP/EU: Sony Computer Entertainment; NA: THQ	June 18, 1998	1,140,609	(Note: Devil Dice: Japan – 1.1 million; United States – 40,609)
NASCAR 99	Stormfront Studios	EA Sports	September 28, 1998	1,140,000	
Tales of Destiny	Wolf Team	Namco	December 23, 1997	1,139,000	
NFL GameDay 99	989 Studios	989 Studios; Sony Computer Entertainment	July 31, 1998	1,120,000	
I.Q.: Intelligent Qube	G-Artists; Sugar & Rockets	Sony Computer Entertainment	January 31, 1997	1,113,288	(Note: I.Q.: Japan – 1.01 million; United States – 103,288)
Doko Demo Issyo	BeXide	Sony Computer Entertainment	July 22, 1999	1,100,000	
beatmania	Konami	Konami	October 1, 1998	1,100,000	
Derby Stallion 99	ParityBit	ASCII Corporation	September 30, 1999	1,100,000	
Star Ocean: The Second Story	tri-Ace	JP: Enix; NA/EU: Sony Computer Entertainment	July 30, 1998	1,094,000	
Ace Combat 2	Namco	Namco	May 30, 1997	1,092,000	
2Xtreme	Sony Interactive Studios America	Sony Computer Entertainment	November 6, 1996	1,090,000	
Parasite Eve II	Square	Square	December 16, 1999	1,090,000	
Twisted Metal	SingleTrac; Sony Interactive Studios America	Sony Computer Entertainment	November 5, 1995	1,080,000	
Test Drive 5	Pitbull Syndicate	Accolade	September 30, 1998	1,080,000	
Twisted Metal 4	989 Studios	Sony Computer Entertainment	October 31, 1999	1,080,000	
SpongeBob SquarePants: SuperSponge	Climax Group	THQ	September 20, 2001	1,070,000	
R4: Ridge Racer Type 4	Namco	JP/NA: Namco; EU: Sony Computer Entertainment	December 3, 1998	1,047,091	(Note: R4: Ridge Racer Type 4: Japan – 759,527; United States – 297,564)
Densha de Go!	Taito	Taito	December 18, 1997	1,040,000	
Dance Dance Revolution 2nd ReMix	Konami	Konami	August 26, 1999	1,032,085	
NFL GameDay	Sony Interactive Studios America	Sony Computer Entertainment	November 1995	1,000,000	
Monster Rancher	Tecmo	Tecmo	July 24, 1997	1,000,000	
Fighting Force	Core Design	Eidos Interactive	October 31, 1997	1,000,000	
Colin McRae Rally	Codemasters	Codemasters	July 1998	1,000,000	
Simple 1500 Series Vol. 1: The Mahjong	Chat Noir; Success	D3 Publisher	October 22, 1998	1,000,000	
Street Fighter Alpha 3	Capcom	Capcom	December 23, 1998	1,000,000	
WCW/nWo Thunder	Inland Productions	THQ	December 31, 1998	1,000,000	
NBA Live 2000	EA Canada	EA Sports	October 31, 1999	1,000,000	
Dancing Stage Party Edition	Konami	Konami	November 15, 2002	1,000,000	

== See also ==
- List of best-selling video games
- List of PlayStation games (A–L)
- List of PlayStation games (M–Z)
