= Twisted Metal III =

1998 vehicular combat video game

- Developer: 989 Studios
- Publisher: 989 Studios
- Director: Howard Liebeskind
- Producer: Ken George
- Programmers: Bill Todd; Jim Buck; Mike Riccio
- Artists: Darrin Fuller; Barry Pringle; James Doyle; Thai Tran; Diane Covill; Brian O'Hara
- Writer: Dan Philips
- Composers: Rob Zombie; Pitchshifter
- Series: Twisted Metal
- Platform: PlayStation
- Release: NA: November 10, 1998
- Genre: Vehicular combat
- Modes: Single-player, multiplayer

Twisted Metal III is a 1998 vehicular combat video game developed and published by 989 Studios for the PlayStation. The game was released only in North America and was re-released for the Sony Greatest Hits line-up in 1999. It is the first installment not to be released in the PAL regions and published directly by Sony Computer Entertainment.

Twisted Metal III is third in the Twisted Metal series and the first to be fully developed by 989 Studios. The game's plot is centered on the titular competition in which various drivers in modified vehicles must destroy the other vehicles in an attempt to be the last one alive. The winner meets the organizer of the competition, a mysterious man named Calypso, who will grant the winner a single wish, regardless of price, size or even reality.

Twisted Metal III received generally mixed reviews from critics, who criticized the game's level design and physics engine but commented positively on the multiplayer gameplay and soundtrack by Rob Zombie and Pitchshifter. However, the game was commercially successful, selling 1.14 million copies in the United States alone.

== Gameplay ==
An example of gameplay in Twisted Metal III featuring Spectre in the North Pole stage

Twisted Metal III is a vehicular combat game in which the player takes control of one of twelve unique vehicles. While in control of a vehicle, the player can accelerate, steer, brake, reverse, activate the turbo, turn tightly, toggle between and activate weapons using the game controller's d-pad, analog sticks and buttons. The game can be played in either the one-player "Tournament" mode or the multi-player "Deathmatch" mode. The Tournament mode consists of an eight-level game. The goal of each level is to destroy all of the opponent vehicles. The enemy vehicles are automatically chosen and their skill increases with each level that is successfully passed. The Tournament continues until all of the player's lives have expired or all levels have been completed. The player has the option to play with a computer-assisted ally to aid in destroying their opponents, but the ending cinematics will not be viewable if a computer-controlled ally is used. If a computer-controlled ally is used, the player has the option to share their total number of lives with the ally. When either player loses a life, the collective number of lives decreases. The Deathmatch mode is a one-to-four-player game in which the player fights head-to-head with other players, though computer-controlled enemy cars can also be incorporated. The Deathmatch ends when one player successfully destroys all other player vehicles, after which the match resets for another battle. Depending on the level selected, the player may select up to seven enemy cars to compete in the match.

The player begins the Tournament mode of the game with three lives. The total number of lives remaining is indicated in the lower left-hand display with the player's health bar, speedometer and turbo. The health bar indicates how much health the player's vehicle has remaining. The length of each of the player's lives is tied to their health bar, which decreases whenever the player's vehicle is damaged by enemy attacks. When the health meter fully depletes, the player loses a life. The player can gain additional health by picking up health icons scattered throughout the environment. If the last life is lost, the game ends prematurely.

Weapons play a key role in winning the game. All vehicles come with a pair of mounted machine guns. They are weak in power, but have unlimited ammunition. Additional weapons scattered throughout the environments can be picked up and utilized if the player drives through them. These weapons include a variety of missiles, bombs, napalm and mortars. Each vehicle can execute three categories of attacks: "Special Weapon Attacks", "Advanced Attacks" and "Combo Attacks". Special Weapon Attacks are unique to each vehicle and are unlimited in stock, but need time to recharge if used repeatedly. Advanced Attacks allow the player to attack enemies when the player is out of weapons, but they can only be used if the Advanced Attack Energy Bar on the lower-right corner of the screen is fully charged. Most Advanced Attacks require three or four buttons sequences to initiate. Combo Attacks combine Advanced Attacks and maneuvers with weapon pick-ups. Combo Attacks can also be performed with a vehicle's special weapon. Due to the open-environment nature of Twisted Metal III, there are numerous possible combos and strategies to invent and discover.

== Plot ==
Twisted Metal 3 takes place in the year 2008, two years after Twisted Metal 2. The interactive environments of Twisted Metal III allow the player to roam the battlefields with few restrictions. The first level takes place in Hollywood, which was devastated by the "Great Earthquake of 2007". The second level, along with the Darkside boss fight, takes place in Washington, D.C. in front of the United States Capitol. The third level takes place in Wright-Patterson Air Force Base's Hangar 18, which houses a large spacecraft that can be accessed. The fourth level takes place in the North Pole near Santa Claus' workshop. The fifth level, along with the Minion boss fight, takes place in London, in which the clock tower that houses Big Ben can be destroyed. The sixth level takes place on the rooftops of Tokyo, while the seventh level takes place in Egypt near the Great Sphinx of Giza. The eighth and final level, along with the Primeval boss fight, takes place in Calypso's personal blimp, in which defeated opponents continuously regenerate until the player destroys a regenerating device hidden in the level.

== Development ==
After developing the first two games in the Twisted Metal series, SingleTrac were bought out by GT Interactive, which meant they could no longer develop for the series, since they were limited to producing games published by GT Interactive and Twisted Metal was property of Sony Computer Entertainment. It was initially announced that despite Twisted Metal III being developed by a Sony internal team instead, David Jaffe would head up development as he had for the first two games, but ultimately development was taken over by 989 Studios (formerly Sony Interactive Studios America who produced the first two games) and Jaffe was only credited in the game under "special thanks". Twisted Metal III runs at 30 frames per second as opposed to its predecessors which run at 20 frames per second.

== Reception ==
Reception

Aggregate score
Aggregator	Score
GameRankings	48.97%

Review scores
Publication	Score
AllGame	1.5/5
Electronic Gaming Monthly	5.37/10
Game Informer	8.25/10
GameFan	87%
GamePro	4.5/5
GameRevolution	C−
GameSpot	4.7/10
IGN	4/10
Next Generation	1/5
Official U.S. PlayStation Magazine	2.5/5
PlayStation: The Official Magazine	2/5

Twisted Metal III received generally mixed reviews from critics, with an aggregate score of 48.97% on GameRankings. Kevin Dick of Game Revolution criticized the "uninspired" level design, "confusing" physics engine and "grainy" graphics, but commented positively on the various multiplayer options and soundtrack by Rob Zombie. Joe Fielder of GameSpot, while admitting the soundtrack by Rob Zombie and Pitchshifter was "fitting", also criticized the "lackluster" level design and "strange" physics engine, advising readers to investigate Activision's Vigilante 8 or GT Interactive's Rogue Trip: Vacation 2012 instead. Doug Perry of IGN stated that "with the exception of the four-player combat and Rob Zombie's hard-rock soundtrack -- the two great things about the game -- Twisted Metal 3 is a middle-of-the-road game that unfortunately doesn't do anything more than the first two games. In fact, it's just plain old hat". The only positive reviews came from GameFan, which gave it 87%; from GamePro, which gave it four-and-a-half stars out of five; and from Game Informer, which gave the game 8.25 out of 10 and wrote that "certainly Twisted Metal 3 is a worthy addition to the series, but it isn't the same car combat game you've grown to know and love. For some this is a good thing, for others the changes are unacceptable". Next Generation reviewed the game, assigning a rating of one star out of five, and opined that "there's nothing to Twisted Metal III but the same drive-and-shoot action from level to level with no payoff to keep your interest".

In its first month of release, Twisted Metal III was the ninth best-selling home console game in the United States. In total, it sold 1.14 million copies in the United States alone. As a result, the game was re-released for the Sony Greatest Hits line-up in 1999.

== See also ==
- List of Sony Greatest Hits games
- List of best-selling PlayStation video games
