= Chemic =

Chemic may refer to:

- Chemic (scientist), a chemist
- The Chemic, a fictional element of the arcade game Phozon
- The Chemics, the nickname of Midland High School (Midland, Michigan), U.S.
- The Chemics, the nickname of English rugby league club Widnes Vikings
