= Outwars =

1998 video game

- Developer: SingleTrac
- Publisher: Microsoft
- Designers: Kellan Hatch; Michael Jackson; Peter Anthony Chiodo; Jay Barnson
- Composers: Chuck E. Myers; Benjamin Carson; Tom Hopkins; Brady Ellis; Tino Saiki
- Platform: Windows
- Release: NA: April 17, 1998; UK: June 5, 1998
- Genre: Tactical shooter
- Modes: Single-player, multiplayer

Outwars is a military science fiction selectable perspective tactical shooter developed by SingleTrac and published by Microsoft in 1998. The plot travels to many different planets and settings.

== Gameplay ==
In single-player mode, wearing a choice of rocket propelled powered armors (Light Scout, Medium Combat, Heavy Assault, or Heavy Dreadnaut), the player controls a heavily armed, male or female member of the elite CDF Marine Jump Corps and must battle insectoid aliens (occasionally referred to as "The Skulls") intent on taking over the galaxy. Gameplay is mission-based, and the player may customize their suit of powered armour with different weapons and equipment at the beginning of each mission. The player may also issue orders to a small team of computer-controlled squadmates. Weapons and gear are gradually unlocked as play progresses, like the glider-wing which attaches to the rocket pack and permits extended aerial maneuvers when it is deployed.

The game also features an 8-player multiplayer mode allowing players to compete with and against one another in the modes: Free for All, Assassin, Smear the cyborg, Team War, Team Mission, and Capture the flag. Direct3D and Internet Gaming Zone were supported for online play.

The legs and the torso can be controlled separately. This function can be disabled by reconfiguring the controls. Furthermore, as in many shooters, the player can switch between a variety of weapons. It is possible to map each of the weapons available to the player to individual keys on the keyboard or joystick. This enables players to fire weapons concurrently rather than consecutively as in a traditional shooter. For example, the shoulder mounted guided missiles, hand-held pulse rifle, and remote-detonation mine can all be fired at the same time.

== Plot ==
Mikhal's World is under attack by "The Skulls". It has become overrun, and the humans are ordering an emergency evacuation. The player has two minutes to reach an escape ship or be left behind. After this, the player is dropped onto Planet Oasis and begins training. But while target training is underway, "The Skulls" attack, forcing an immediate evacuation from the area.

War has broken out all over Oasis, with the humans losing badly. The player's team is sent to grab all supplies from Oasis (in a return to the jump training mission) and prepare the jumpship for evacuation. Eventually, a total evacuation is ordered on Oasis, but the player must retrieve 'special technology' from the now abandoned military base on Oasis before leaving. Right after the player escapes, Oasis is annihilated by some form of alien technology, and, in Hackett's words, "Have turned it into some kind of planet from hell".

The humans plan a last-ditch attempt to destroy 'The Skulls', but their first priority is to secure Planet Anubis, where the miners have discovered something in the mine shafts. No survivors are found, but the player is sent to destroy the mine shafts and whatever may be in there. The player soon discovers that 'The Skulls' were living underground, but sick and tired of constant threat by the miners, they set out to eradicate all humans from existence. But while moving through the mine shafts, the player falls deep into the Skulls' lair. The player first meets a 'Queen' in this level, and after defeating it, the CDF find and evacuate the player. They prepare to send the player's team onto the enemy's current stronghold, the Juggernaut, but are ambushed along the way.

The Ulysses is shot down, and the player is dropped by accident onto Ragnarok. After meeting up with another survivor, the player is forced to take down the enemy's air gun that is keeping the CDF from rescuing the player and the player's teammate. After the air gun is destroyed, the player is sent to investigate the Ulysses to rescue Commander Hackett, retrieve the command data from him, and afterwards, assist the troops in a war at the ravine. It is decided that the Ulysses is too dangerous to be left standing, so the player is sent back to destroy it. Afterwards, the player leaves Ragnarok, and resumes the mission of destroying the Juggernaut. They first capture the Mastermind to find out the codes for the security locks on the Juggernaut, and after killing the second queen, the player rushes off the Juggernaut before it explodes. They find out, however, that Oasis (now known as DeadWorld) has been established as 'The Skulls' main base of operations, and they are set to beat the humans once and for all by eradicating their home – Earth.

A last-ditch attempt is thrown to disable their primary attack and turn it against them, ending the Skulls threat once and for all. The player manages to get inside the gun, and is given a limited amount of time before it fires. While disabling the gun, the player meets the sole boss of the game, The King. After his defeat, it turns out that he was the main control for the gun, and without him, the Skulls are doomed. The player reactivates the gun and escapes seconds before the planet destroys itself. The player is then given one last message before the logo and credits: "Stay there, Captain. We're coming to get you".

=== Alternate scenes ===
- If the player does not escape Mikhal's world in time, the planet blows up, but the dropship does not appear, indicating the player did not escape.
- On Oasis, there is a mission where the player is told to blow the base reactors up. If the player fails, the screen brightens extremely, and the player instantly collapses and disintegrates (of all the scenes, this is not a cutscene, it is gameplay).
- If the player does not escape the Juggernaut before it blows up, like the Mikhal's World scene, there is no dropship shown when it blows up.
- If the player is killed by the King, or runs out of time on the Final Mission on DeadWorld, a long cutscene is shown where the DeadWorld gun fires, and produces similar results as with Oasis/DeadWorld.

== Development ==
Outwars was SingleTrac's first project for a platform other than the PlayStation. Though SingleTrac was purchased by GT Interactive in 1997, it was already under contract to develop Outwars for Microsoft.

== Reception ==
Reception

Review scores
Publication	Score
CNET Gamecenter	4/10
Computer Games Strategy Plus	3/5
Computer Gaming World	2.5/5
Game Informer	6/10
GameSpot	7.8/10
Next Generation	1/5
PC Gamer (UK)	83%
PC Gamer (US)	45%
PC PowerPlay	85%
PC Zone	86%

Pelit scored the game 90 out of 100 and summarized, "Don't let the bad graphics distract you from the excellent game underneath."

Next Generation gave a negative review of the game, citing severe technical issues; from clipping to AI that add up to an overall bad experience.
