= Animorphs: Shattered Reality =

2000 video game

- Cover art
- Developer: SingleTrac
- Publisher: Infogrames
- Producer: Brian Christiansen
- Programmers: Colette Mullenhoff; Kerry Thompson
- Artist: Matthew Copeland
- Composers: Chuck Meyers; Tom Hopkins
- Platform: PlayStation
- Release: NA: November 20, 2000
- Genres: Action, platform
- Mode: Single-player

Animorphs: Shattered Reality is a 2000 game for the Sony PlayStation. It is based upon the Scholastic book series Animorphs by K. A. Applegate. It was the last game made by SingleTrac shortly before the studio closed down.

== Plot ==
Visser Three has obtained a machine that allows him to alter or destroy reality itself. Four of the Animorphs (Tobias and Ax are not present in the game) must collect pieces of the Continuum Crystal using their various animal morphs.

== Gameplay ==
Animorphs: Shattered Reality is mostly a platform game, with occasional combat against the monsters that will show up along the way. In most of these eight levels, the goal is to pass a series of various obstacle jumps. Some obstacles include interlocking turning gears, or air blasters that send the player upwards in various directions. The jumps are designed to be inconsistently spaced compared to each other, forcing the players to time the moves well in order to progress. The view will often switch between side scrolling parts and areas with moving in and out of the background in a more limited way.

Sometimes, the player may be confronted by an enemy, automatically initiating a transformation to the respective animal. At that point, the battle will start with a two minutes time limit to complete. The morphs used are different for each character: Tiger for Jake, Bear for Rachel, Rhino for Marco, and Wolf for Cassie. All of them use only one, single type of attack. Since they have the same ability, taking one over the other forms gives no upper hand. There are three stages that stray from the usual gameplay and offer the option of staying in dolphin, dragonfly, or bat forms for a longer period of time. Each time hundred "A" tokens are collected, the players will receive an extra life.

== Reception ==
Reception

Aggregate score
Aggregator	Score
GameRankings	47.60%

Review scores
Publication	Score
AllGame	3/5
GameSpot	3.5/10
IGN	3.5/10

Reception of the game was considerably poor. It received an average review score of 47.6% according to review aggregator Game Rankings. Frank Provo of GameSpot gave the game a score of 3.5 out of 10, saying that while the characters "animate fluidly" and praising the level and sound design, he also says the game "stumbles... in terms of gameplay and longevity," consisting of mostly jumping. Jeremy Conrad of IGN gave it a similar review, saying that "the game is just so boring your main challenge will be to stay awake throughout each level." Like Provo, he also states that the player characters are only able to "run and jump," and "cannot attack." He praised the background and environment textures, but criticized the character and enemy models, saying "it almost looks as if the same polygonal model was used for all four characters, with the only difference being the personalities."
