= Favoritos =

PlayStation budget range in South America

Favoritos (Spanish and Portuguese for favorites) is the Sony PlayStation budget range in South America, currently offering PlayStation 3 games at a lower price point than initial release. Similar budget ranges from Sony include the Greatest Hits and The Best labels for the North American and Asian markets, respectively.

Official banner

The range was first announced at E3 2013, with the initial selection of games including Gran Turismo 5, Heavy Rain and Twisted Metal, among others.

== PlayStation 3 titles ==
The Favoritos line includes the following titles

- Assassin's Creed: Revelations
- Bayonetta
- BioShock
- Borderlands
- Call of Duty 4: Modern Warfare
- CounterSpy
- Castlevania: Lords of Shadow
- Darksiders
- Darksiders II
- Dead Nation
- Deadly Premonition
- Dead or Alive 5 Ultimate
- Demon’s Souls
- Devil May Cry HD Collection
- DmC: Devil May Cry
- DuckTales: Remastered
- Everybody Dance
- EyePet & Friends
- Fallout: New Vegas
- Final Fantasy XIII
- God of War Collection
- God of War: Origins Collection
- God of War 3
- God of War: Ascension
- Gran Turismo 5 XL Edition
- Heavy Rain: Director's Cut
- Hohokum
- InFAMOUS 2
- Jak and Daxter Collection
- Journey Collector's Edition
- Just Dance 3
- Killzone 2
- Killzone 3
- L.A. Noire
- LittleBigPlanet 2 Special Edition
- Max Payne 3
- Metal Gear Solid HD Collection
- Metal Gear Solid 4: Guns of the Patriots
- ModNation Racers
- MotorStorm: Apocalypse
- Ninja Gaiden 3
- Rain
- PlayStation All-Stars Battle Royale
- Ratchet & Clank: All 4 One
- Rayman Origins
- Red Dead Redemption
- Red Dead Redemption: Undead Nightmare
- Resident Evil 5: Gold Edition
- Resistance 3
- Saints Row: The Third
- Sound Shapes
- Spec Ops: The Line
- The Tomb Raider Trilogy
- Transformers: Fall of Cybertron
- Twisted Metal
- Silent Hill HD Collection
- Sonic Generations
- Super Street Fighter IV: Arcade Edition
- The Amazing Spider-Man
- The Ico & Shadow of the Colossus Collection
- The King of Fighters XIII
- The Walking Dead – Game of the Year
- Uncharted: Drake's Fortune
- Uncharted 2: Among Thieves
- Uncharted 3: Drake's Deception
- Valkyria Chronicles
- Vanquish
- Zone of the Enders HD Collection

== See also ==
- Greatest Hits, the North American budget range.
- The Best, the Japanese budget range.
- Nintendo Selects, a similar marketing label used by Nintendo.
