= Critical Depth (video game) =

1997 video game

- North American cover art
- Developer: SingleTrac
- Publisher: GT Interactive
- Platform: PlayStation
- Release: NA: November 21, 1997; EU: December 1997
- Genre: Vehicular combat
- Modes: Single-player, multiplayer

Critical Depth is a 1997 vehicular combat game developed by SingleTrac and published by GT Interactive for the PlayStation. It was released on November 21, 1997.

Critical Depth is based on the concept and engine of SingleTrac's original best selling Twisted Metal franchise (a demolition derby which permits the usage of ballistic projectiles), but occurs under water. All vehicles in the game are submarines. Players choose a sub and an arena in single mode to engage in fights with opposing sailors. A variety of weapons and upgrades are obtainable by pick-ups scattered throughout the stage as well as each sub having their own exclusive "special weapon". The goal on an arena is to retrieve all five pods, which are scattered throughout the level, and find the escape gateway. Each pod gives its holder an extra power.

The game features three modes of play: a mission/story mode, where the player (or two players cooperatively) can battle through eleven levels; a battle mode, where the player captures pods in a selectable level; and deathmatch, where the player battles against the computer or another human in a split-screen mode.

== Story ==
The story is based on the disappearance of undersea explorer Douglas McKragen and the discovery of five mysterious and powerful alien pod-shaped objects. Twelve different factions enter the sea to find out more about these forces and uncover their mystery, each for its own reasons. Each faction battles several competitors in order to retrieve the pods.

== Gameplay ==
The playable ships are divided into factions, one of which the player must align with at the beginning of the game. Once they do, a mix of the eleven other ships will constantly stand in their way. Four additional characters can be unlocked by reaching certain goals in the game.

Levels are cleared by recovering the five pods found in each level to open a slipgate to the next level.

== Development ==
SingleTrac initially intended to publish Critical Depth themselves. However, during the game's development the company was purchased by GT Interactive, so Critical Depth became the first game to go towards the fulfillment of SingleTrac's terms of acquisition. The game was showcased at E3 1997.

== Reception ==
Reception

Review scores
Publication	Score
Electronic Gaming Monthly	7.25/10
GameSpot	7.5/10
IGN	5/10

Critical Depth received a wide variety of reviews. At one end, GameSpot cited several gameplay innovations and assessed that "It's a worthy successor to SingleTrac's Twisted Metal line and fans of the series should be very pleased." At the other, IGN razed the game's submarine designs, environments, and controls, before concluding, "It's not totally dreadful -- it's fun for a while -- but it just lacks lasting appeal and is filled with irritations. To be honest, the whole thing feels like an early '96 PSX game, and certainly doesn't compare to the likes of Twisted Metal II". Electronic Gaming Monthly's (EGM) four reviewers were evenly split, with Shawn Smith and Howard Grossman saying the game is flawed but enjoyable, while Kraig Kujawa and Kelly Rickards found it slow-paced and unexciting. GamePro similarly judged, "What sets CD apart from Twisted Metal is the game's slow pace. Even with a sub's turbo kicked on, the game drags as you search out enemies in levels that offer too many hiding places."

One point of contention was the game's level of strategic depth. EGM's Shawn Smith and IGN's Jaz Rignall both said that most levels can be won by letting the enemy craft fight each other over the pods, collecting power-ups while waiting for one of them to acquire all five pods, then taking out the remaining enemy to seize the pods and quickly heading to the exit, a strategy which they found too simple and easy. GameSpot's Joe Fielder, however, argued that this strategy is not reliable: "Certainly, you can try to hide from the computer opponents and wait until they've worn each other down a bit. But the downside of that is you could find yourself against a much stronger pod-enhanced enemy, or you might even lose the match to a ship that sneaked off through the gateway with all five pods in tow."

The graphics were generally not well-regarded. GameSpot and GamePro both noted considerable draw in, while EGM and GameSpot criticized the frame rate and IGN cited ugly textures and pixelation. EGM and IGN both praised the game's deathmatch mode as its strongest point.
