= Streak: Hoverboard Racing =

1998 video game

- Developer: SingleTrac
- Publisher: GT Interactive
- Platform: PlayStation
- Release: December 5, 1998
- Genre: Racing
- Modes: Single player, multiplayer

Streak: Hoverboard Racing is a 1998 futuristic racing video game developed by SingleTrac and published by GT Interactive for the PlayStation.

== Gameplay ==
Streak: Hoverboard Racing is a futuristic racing game where players control anti-gravity hoverboards, competing across various tracks while performing stunts to gain speed. The game features a standard race mode, where players progress through increasingly difficult courses, and a Freestyle mode, which focuses on tricks and scoring. Multiplayer options allow for single-player, two-player, and link cable competitions.

== Development ==
The game was developed by the same team that did Jet Moto and Jet Moto 2.

== Reception ==
Reception

Review scores
Publication	Score
GameSpot	5.1/10
Gamezilla	77/100
Game Informer	8.25/10
IGN	4.5/10

GameSpot gave the game a score of 5.1 out of 10 criticizing the "questionable physics, stiff animation, low polygon counts, and ridiculously difficult tracks."

The Daily Times said "Some would say the challenge is finishing high enough to advance. For us, the challenge was turning the game off and walking away"
