= Phozon =

1983 video game

- Arcade flyer
- Developer: Namco
- Publisher: Namco
- Platform: Arcade
- Release: JP: November 1983
- Genre: Puzzle
- Modes: Single-player, multiplayer
- Arcade system: Namco Phozon

Phozon (Note: Japanese: フォゾン, Hepburn: Fozon) is a 1983 puzzle video game developed and published by Namco for arcades. It was only released in Japan in November 1983. It is notable for its chemistry-based gameplay.

== Gameplay ==
Screenshot of the game

The player takes control of the Chemic, a small black atom with red spikes that must adhere itself to passing Moleks (which come in four different colors: cyan, green, pink and yellow) in order to duplicate the patterns shown in the center of the screen; if a Molek adheres itself to the Chemic incorrectly, the player can press the button to disconnect the most recently connected Molek. A stage is completed by correctly replicating the Molek formation shown in the center of the screen. The yellow counter at the bottom shows how many Moleks are remaining, which decreases as more Moleks appear. If the bar empties and the player has not replicated the Molek formation, the round restarts from the beginning.

The sole enemy in the game is the Atomic, a clump of balls that moves randomly around the screen and kills the Chemic on contact. From the second world on, the Chemic can counter-attack by adhering itself to a Power Molek. Once the Chemic has adhered itself to one, the adhered Moleks will spin around rapidly, and their speed will decrease to denote the nearing of the Power Molek's ending time limit.

The Atomic occasionally initiates attacks to destroy the Chemic, which include splitting up and reforming in order to cover more ground, and shooting Alpha-Rays and Beta-Rays that destroy some of the Chemic's connected Moleks. There are total of eighteen unique patterns which must be duplicated in the game, and every fourth stage is a "challenging stage" where the Chemic can fire yellow Moleks in four directions at the Atomic.

== Reception ==
Reception

Review score
Publication	Score
AllGame	4.5/5

In Japan, Game Machine listed Phozon as the second most popular arcade game of December 1983.

In North America, the game was demonstrated at the Amusement & Music Operators Association (AMOA) show in October 1983, but was not licensed for release in the region. Gene Lewin of Play Meter magazine gave it a favorable review, calling it "a very colorful and challenging game with a different twist" based on chemistry.

== Legacy ==
Phozon was re-released as part of Namco Museum Volume 3 for the PlayStation along with Dig Dug, Ms. Pac-Man, Pole Position II and other Namco games. Another port was released for iOS and Android, as part of the Namco Arcade application. Hamster Corporation released the game as part of their Arcade Archives series for the Nintendo Switch and PlayStation 4 in November 2021.
