= Twisted Metal (1995 video game) =

Vehicular combat game

- North American PlayStation box art, depicting Needles Kane and his ice cream truck
- Developers: SingleTrac; Sony Interactive Studios America
- Publishers: Sony Computer Entertainment; Sony Music Entertainment Japan (Windows)
- Director: Michael D. Jackson
- Producers: Scott Campbell; Allan Becker
- Designers: David Jaffe; Mike Giam
- Programmers: Steve Poulson; Travis Hilton; Jay Barnson
- Composers: Chuck E. Myers; Tom Hopkins; Lance Lenhart
- Series: Twisted Metal
- Platforms: PlayStation, Windows
- Release: PlayStation: NA: November 10, 1995; EU: January 16, 1996; JP: November 15, 1996; Windows: JP: December 21, 1996
- Genre: Vehicular combat
- Modes: Single-player, multiplayer (Note: Up to 2 players.)

Twisted Metal is a vehicular combat video game developed by SingleTrac and Sony Interactive Studios America, published by Sony Computer Entertainment for the PlayStation in 1995, with a port to Windows 95 published by Sony Music Entertainment Japan in 1996. The game's plot is centered on the titular competition in which various drivers in modified vehicles must destroy the other vehicles in an attempt to be the last one alive. The winner meets the organizer of the competition, a mysterious man named Calypso, who will grant the winner a single wish, regardless of price, size or even reality. A commercial success, it was followed up by a sequel, Twisted Metal 2 (1996), as part of the Twisted Metal series.

== Gameplay ==
An example of gameplay in Twisted Metal featuring Sweet Tooth in the Rooftop Combat stage

Twisted Metal is a vehicular combat game in which the player takes control of one of twelve unique vehicles. While in control of a vehicle, the player can accelerate, steer, brake, reverse, activate the turbo, turn tightly, toggle between and activate weapons using the game controller's d-pad and buttons. The game can be played in either the one-player mode (in which the game's story takes place) or the Duel Mode (in which two human players can select a battleground on which to compete in). In the one-player mode, the player must progress through six combat arenas of progressively increasing size and featuring progressively more opponents. To clear a level, the player must destroy all of the enemy vehicles in that level. The game lasts until all of the player's lives have expired or until all six levels have been cleared.

The player begins the game with three lives, indicated by the stacked green boxes on the bottom right corner of the screen. The length of each of the player's lives is tied to their health bar (located to the left of the life boxes), which decreases whenever the player's vehicle is damaged by enemy attacks. The player can replenish a portion of their vehicle's health bar by driving through blue ramps called "Health Stations" scattered throughout the environments. The difficulty level the game is set on determines how much of the vehicle's health is replenished and how fast the stations recharge once the player has used them. Each time the health bar is fully depleted, the player loses a life. If the last life is lost, the game ends.

Weapons play a key role in winning the game. All vehicles come with a pair of mounted machine guns. They are weak in power, but have unlimited ammunition. However, the guns can overheat if used for too long at a time, preluded by the overheat light on the bottom-right corner of the screen blinking red. When the light becomes fully red, the machine guns will cease to function and the player will have to allow the guns to cool off before they can be used again. Additional weapons scattered throughout the environments can be picked up and utilized if the player drives through them. These weapons include a variety of missiles, land mines, tire spikes and oil slicks. All vehicles can carry up to 30 weapons.

== Plot ==
=== Setting ===
The game takes place in the streets of Los Angeles on Christmas Eve, 2005. The contest featured in the game is the tenth annual running of the competition thus far. The first level, the "Arena", is an underground arena. The second level, "Warehouse District Warfare", takes place in the warehouse district of downtown Los Angeles. The third level, "Freeway Free for All", takes place on the freeways of Los Angeles. The fourth level, "River Park Rumble", takes place in Beverly Hills. The fifth and largest of the six levels, "Cyburbia", takes place in the suburbs. The sixth and final level, "Rooftop Combat", takes place on the rooftops of Los Angeles' tallest skyscrapers. After defeating all the opponents, the player must face the final boss Minion. The game is won when Minion is defeated.

=== Story ===
Once a year the legendary Calypso, a man who dwells beneath the streets of Los Angeles, holds the "Twisted Metal" competition. The contest takes place all around the Los Angeles area and calls upon drivers in various different vehicles to battle to the death. The contestants are selected and contacted by Calypso via an email message that simply reads "WILL YOU DRIVE?" in red letters. The one driver still alive at the end of the night is granted a single wish, with no limits on price, size or, according to some, even reality.

== Development and release ==
Twisted Metal was developed by SingleTrac and produced by Sony Interactive Studios America. David Jaffe, a tester and later designer for Sony Imagesoft (a division of Sony Computer Entertainment) was appointed to head the design of a game for its first home console, the PlayStation. Jaffe had difficulty establishing positive relationships among industry developers due to his hubris. Given one final chance, Jaffe joined fellow designer Mike Giam and their boss, Sony Santa Monica's Alan Becker, for a meeting with the Evans & Sutherland company in Salt Lake City. Evans & Sutherland, a commercial and military computer simulation firm, had been contracted by Sony to create a 3D game for the new system. Initially, the development team members had difficulty coming up with ideas to fully implement the Evans & Sutherland technology. Upon returning from the meeting, the brainstorming lead designers were inspired while being stuck in a traffic jam on Interstate 405, when they jokingly fantasized about using guns and missiles on the other cars. Jaffe recalled: "We had these amazing visions of this Michael Bay or Michael Mann action movie going down the 405 freeway in LA, with car combat out of Mad Max and a potpourri of explosions". When the vehicular combat idea was pitched to the Utah programmers, director Michael D. Jackson suggested the idea of a pizza delivery simulation, Jaffe demurred and the more violent concept won out.

Members of Evans & Sutherland joined the game designers in forming SingleTrac in the spring of 1994. Given a deadline of less than 12 months, SingleTrac was granted $2 million in advance royalties by Sony to develop two games for the PlayStation. SingleTrac began simultaneously developing the two projects, codenamed "Red Mercury" (Warhawk) and "Firestorm" (Twisted Metal). The two actually began as a single game with a common code base. During the testing phase, the player would be able to fly the Warhawk ship around the first arena of Twisted Metal and fire weapons at the cars below. Additionally, the second and third arenas of Twisted Metal were also originally one large stage; the designers found the stage too large for the limited number of enemies, which, along with several technical issues, prompted them to split it into two levels and shrink them down. The first arena was designed to be small so that the players would get used to the controls. Before finalizing the game's title, the developer considered various monikers including "Urban Assault", "Cars and Rockets", and "High Octane". SingleTrac also filmed live action footage for each character's ending, but it was not featured in the game's final release because some members of the development team found it too offensive. The endings were eventually included as bonus content in Twisted Metal Head-On: Extra Twisted Edition for the PlayStation 2.

Twisted Metal was first shown alongside Warhawk at the first annual E3 in Los Angeles between May 11 and 13, 1995. The two games were among the first PlayStation titles available outside Japan and were part of a large, multimedia advertising campaign by Sony for the console's western debut. Retailers and members of the press were given custom Twisted Metal license plates to promote the game. Despite some criticism from members of Sony Computer Entertainment's Japanese division and focus test groups just prior to its marketing phase, Twisted Metal went gold and was completed on a budget of $850,000.

Twisted Metal was officially released for the PlayStation in North America on November 5, 1995, in Europe on January 6 and in Japan on November 15, 1996. The North American version was re-released for the Sony Greatest Hits line-up on March 3, 1997. A PC version of the game was also developed and used to showcase the Windows 95-compatible Nvidia NV1 graphics accelerator chip at the Windows Hardware Engineering Conference in 1996.

== Reception and legacy ==
Reception

Aggregate score
Aggregator	Score
GameRankings	66.88% (PS)

Review scores
Publication	Score
AllGame	4/5 (PC)
Computer and Video Games	5/5 (PS)
Electronic Gaming Monthly	9.25/10 (PS)
Famitsu	5/10, 3/10, 4/10, 5/10 (PS)
Game Informer	8.5/10 (PS)
Game Players	90% (PS)
GameFan	91% (PS)
GamePro	14/20
GameRevolution	B+ (PS)
Hyper	88/100 (PS)
IGN	7/10 (PS)
Next Generation	4/5 (PS)
Maximum	3/5 (PS)

Twisted Metal received positive reviews from critics. It received an aggregate score of 66.88% on GameRankings. Game Revolution praised the game's action and variety of the vehicles, but noted that the graphics were "a little sloppy". IGN criticized the single-player mode's short length of "just a couple of hours", but remarked that the two-player mode "more than makes up for the one-player mode's lack of length". Twisted Metal was awarded the 1995 "Game of the Year" from the editors of Electronic Gaming Monthly. The Black Widow of GamePro criticized the graphics for their static arena crowd, difficult-to-read radar, and heavy break-up, and described the music as "weak overall". However, they concluded that "despite its flaws, this twisted game is fun". Maximum applauded the varying strengths and weaknesses of the vehicles and most especially the innovative free-roaming levels. They criticized that the game is much too short and concluded: "A playable game, but one which is probably destined for obscurity". A reviewer for Next Generation called it "another showcase title for the PlayStation", and said that while the texture maps are simple, this allows the action to play out fast enough that players will rarely notice the lack of detail. He agreed with Maximum that the game is too short, contending that even players with nominal skill will reach the final stage in about two hours, but felt that the enduring fun of the two-player mode "nearly" makes up for this.

Twisted Metal was commercially successful. By 1996, Twisted Metal and Warhawk had sold over 500,000 units combined and generated some $28 million in revenue for publisher Sony. To date, Twisted Metal has sold over one million copies in the North America alone. As a result, Sony re-released the game as part of its budget Greatest Hits range of games in March 1997.

The game was re-released on other consoles through Sony's PlayStation Network service on February 23, 2011, in PAL region, and on February 12, 2013, in North America. It was then made available for PlayStation 4 and PlayStation 5 on July 18, 2023.

== See also ==
- List of Sony Greatest Hits games
- List of best-selling PlayStation video games
