= NFL GameDay (video game) =

1995 video game

- North American cover art
- Developer: Sony Interactive Studios America
- Publisher: Sony Computer Entertainment America
- Programmers: Kelly Walker; Amir Zbeda
- Artists: Holliday Horton; Scott Atkins; Milo Cooper; Kevin Weinstein
- Composer: The Pinnacle Group
- Series: NFL GameDay
- Platform: PlayStation
- Release: NA: December 4, 1995
- Genre: Sports
- Modes: Single-player, multiplayer

NFL GameDay is the first video game in the NFL GameDay series of American football video games, and was released in 1995 on the PlayStation video game console as a competitor to the Madden NFL football game series. It was developed by Sony Interactive Studios America and published by Sony Computer Entertainment.

The cover athlete is William Floyd.

== Gameplay ==
The game makes use of motion capture for its animations.

== Reception ==
Reception

Review scores
Publication	Score
Electronic Gaming Monthly	9/10
GameFan	195/200
Next Generation	5/5
Maximum	3/5

The game was a success for Sony, selling over 300,000 copies by March 1996 and briefly holding the record for best-selling PlayStation game in the United States until it was overtaken by Resident Evil later that year. By the end of 1996, GameDay had sold over 1 million units worldwide.

It was also a critical success. Both of the sports reviewers for Electronic Gaming Monthly gave the game a 9 out of 10, saying it "could very well be the Madden killer that everyone is waiting for." Scary Larry of GamePro called it "the best football CD to date", citing the graphics, accurate gameplay performance of each individual player, appropriately sized sprites, and comprehensive sound effects. A reviewer for Next Generation found that in addition to the comprehensive teams, stadiums, and playbooks, NFL Gameday benefited from truly modern graphics, animation, and sounds, as well as an innovative level of control over individual players and an AI which creates an authentic football experience. He criticized the unrealistic results of breaking up a pass, but concluded, "NFL Gameday isn't the perfect football game, but it is the best football game ever made, so far." David Hodgson of Maximum remarked that the graphics suffer from jerky animation and a general last-generation appearance, but are outweighed by the outstanding gameplay and reliable player AI. He summarized that the game "plays quite a mean game of American football without ever becoming bogged down in horrific amounts of tactical decisions."

GamePro awarded it Best Sports Game of 1995. Next Generation ranked it number 28 on their 1996 "Top 100 Games of All Time", citing its authentic football gameplay and looks, and its combination of accessibility and depth. It was a finalist for the Computer Game Developers Conference's 1996 "Best Sports Game" Spotlight Award, but lost the prize to NHL 97.

In 1998, Next Generation listed NFL GameDay as number 43 on their "Top 50 Games of All Time", commenting that, "Truly, this is the football game that appeals to both the hardcore and the masses."
