= Namco Museum Vol. 3 =

1996 video game

- Developer: Now Production
- Publishers: JP: Namco; NA: Namco Hometek; PAL: Sony Computer Entertainment
- Series: Namco Museum
- Platform: PlayStation
- Release: JP: June 21, 1996; NA/EU: February 1997; AU: 1997
- Genre: Various
- Modes: Single-player, multiplayer

Namco Museum Vol. 3 (ナムコミュージアム VOL.3, Namuko Myūshiamu Vol. 3) is a video game compilation developed by Now Production for PlayStation in 1996-1997. It is the third game in the Namco Museum series.

== Compilation ==
The following six video games in this compilation are included:

- Galaxian (1979)
- Dig Dug (1982)
- Ms. Pac-Man (1982)
- Phozon (1983)
- Pole Position II (1983)
- The Tower of Druaga (1984)

== Reception ==
Reception

Aggregate score
Aggregator	Score
GameRankings	66%

Review scores
Publication	Score
AllGame	4/5
CNET Gamecenter	8/10
Computer and Video Games	3/5
EP Daily	6/10
Famitsu	27/40
Game Informer	7.25/10
GameSpot	5.6/10
IGN	6/10
Mega Fun	49%
Next Generation	3/5

The game received average reviews. Next Generation said, "With two volumes still to come, Namco is clearly stretching a series that could have been condensed into three discs without the superfluous B titles. But the number of true classics in Volume 3 [sic] outweigh the ones that never should have been unearthed." In Japan, Famitsu gave it a score of 27 out of 40.

Dr. Zombie of GamePro called it "must-have arcade fun that will provide hours of classic gaming until Namco preps Volume 4. Thanks for the memories, Namco!" (Note: GamePro gave the game three 4.5/5 scores for graphics, sound, and fun factor, and 4/5 for control.)
