= WWF WrestleMania: The Arcade Game =

1995 video game

- Arcade flyer with Bret Hart
- Developers: Midway (arcade); Sculptured Software (home)
- Publishers: Midway Games (arcade); Acclaim Entertainment (home)
- Designers: Mark Turmell; Jason Skiles; Jamie Rivett; Jake Simpson; Shawn Liptak; Sal Divita; Joshua Y. Tsui; Eugene Geer; Tony Goskie
- Artists: Sal Divita; Joshua Y. Tsui; Eugene Geer; Tony Goskie
- Composer: Chris Granner
- Series: WWF
- Platforms: Arcade; Genesis; 32X; Super NES; PlayStation; Saturn; MS-DOS
- Release: Arcade: NA: 1995; 32X: NA: November 1995; Mega Drive/Genesis: NA: November 1995; EU: 1995; MS-DOS: NA: 1995; PlayStation: NA: October 18, 1995; EU: November 1995; Saturn: NA: May 30, 1996; EU: June 1996; Super NES: NA: November 1995; EU: January 25, 1996
- Genres: Sports-based fighting
- Modes: Up to 2 players, simultaneous
- Arcade system: Midway Wolf Unit hardware Sound CPU: ADSP2150; Midway Digital Compression System (DCS) – Amplified Mono

WWF WrestleMania (released on home consoles as WWF WrestleMania: The Arcade Game) is a professional wrestling arcade video game released by Midway Manufacturing Co. in 1995. It is based on the World Wrestling Federation (WWF) professional wrestling promotion.

The game features digitized representations of eight WWF performers who are pitted against each other in fast-paced matches inspired by Midway's Mortal Kombat and NBA Jam games. Commentary is provided by Vince McMahon and Jerry "The King" Lawler, who also appear in the game sitting at the announcers' table to the right of the ring, and Howard Finkel welcoming players to Wrestlemania at the start screen.

Acclaim, which published the console versions of the game, released a follow-up in 1996: WWF In Your House.

== Gameplay ==
Lex Luger faces off against Bret Hart.

Although based on professional wrestling, WWF WrestleMania's digitized graphics and fast-paced gameplay make it more of a fighting game than a sports/wrestling game inspired by Midway's popular Mortal Kombat series. What separates this game from previous and future WWF/WWE video games is its over-the-top and very cartoonish attacks. Examples include Doink the Clown pulling out a mallet out of thin air, Razor Ramon's arm transforming into a blade, or Bam Bam Bigelow's fists catching on fire. While actual wrestling moves are present, matches consist primarily of strike attacks and special moves. There are other similarities to the Mortal Kombat games, such as uppercuts that cause the opponent to go sky high, flawless victories and very tongue-in-cheek character animations.

WWF WrestleMania's one-player mode has the player choose one of eight wrestling superstars – Bret "The Hitman" Hart, The Undertaker, Shawn Michaels, Razor Ramon, Bam Bam Bigelow, Yokozuna, Doink the Clown, and Lex Luger. A unique feature is that each character can "bleed" an object that represents them. Such "bleeding" objects include dumbbells flying out of Lex Luger and valentine hearts coming out of Bret Hart.

WWF WrestleMania features two single-player modes: the Intercontinental Championship and the WWF Championship. In the Intercontinental Championship mode, the player must win four one-on-one matches, two Handicap 2-on-1 matches, and one Handicap 3-on-1 match to win the title. In the more difficult WWF Championship mode, the player must win four Handicap 2-on-1 matches, two Handicap 3-on-1 matches, and finally a "WrestleMania Challenge," where the player must defeat every wrestler in the game in a gauntlet, starting with a three-on-one setup, with each eliminated opponent being replaced with another until all eight have been defeated.

The game also features two multi-player modes; head to head, a one-on-one match between two players, or cooperative, where the two players team up in a tag team version of the WrestleMania Challenge in which they must defeat the game's eight wrestlers in groups of two to become the Tag Team Champions. In-game music consists of snippets from the roster's circa-1994 entrance music (with the exception of Shawn Michaels, who has the older, Sherri Martel version of "Sexy Boy", and Undertaker with his previous theme when he had the Western Mortician moniker from 1991 to 1994), as well as the opening themes to WWF Monday Night RAW, WWF Superstars, and WWF Wrestling Challenge.

== Development ==
Programmer Mark Turmell stated that "I worked 16 hours a day, seven days a week for six months to get WWF WrestleMania out. People play the game all day in my office and give me feedback, plus artists are always coming in with new ideas for me and my partner, Sal DiVita."

Shortly after the game was released, Midway executive Roger Sharpe claimed that Adam Bomb appears in the game. Many years later, developer Sal DiVita confirmed that Adam Bomb was a hidden character, but also stated that the character in the game was not fully completed.

== Ports ==
Ports were developed for Mega Drive/Genesis, 32X, Super NES, PlayStation, Sega Saturn, and MS-DOS.

The Super NES release omits Bam Bam Bigelow and Yokozuna. When the maximum of three characters are on screen simultaneously, the game slows down. It also lacks several voice and commentary samples and damage taken by in-game fighters from attacks was reduced.

The Genesis version retains most of the voice and commentary samples from the arcade and allows for four wrestlers on-screen, also with slow down. The 32X release is similar to the standard Genesis version, but with improved graphics and audio. However, the frame rate was reduced to 30 frames per second in the 32X port compared to 60 frames per second in all other versions.

The PlayStation version omits most of the background music especially during the matches, match transition and title screen and plays the theme songs of the victorious wrestler on a small loop only after one on one victory between two players, and the only other music played is during the end of the Intercontinental, World Wrestling Federation tournaments, the end of the Tag Team rumble, and during the credits. But includes much more improved graphics with no slow down when the maximum number of wrestlers are present in the ring. Also introduces an introduction by Howard Finkel, albeit the removal of Midway mentions, and the theme song for Wrestlemania 8 through XIV on the character select screen.

== Reception ==
Reception

Review scores
Publication	Score				
Publication	Arcade	PS	Saturn	Sega Genesis	SNES
AllGame	4/5	N/A	1.5/5	N/A	N/A
Computer and Video Games	N/A	N/A	3/5	N/A	N/A
Electronic Gaming Monthly	N/A	9/10	N/A	N/A	N/A
EP Daily	N/A	N/A	8.5/10	N/A	N/A
GamePro	19.5/20	19.5/20	18/20	16/20; 17/20 (32X)	6.5/20
IGN	N/A	7/10	N/A	5.5/10 (32X)	N/A
Mean Machines Sega	N/A	N/A	80/100	N/A	N/A
Mega Fun	N/A	86%	86%	86%	83%
Next Generation	3/5	4/5	N/A	N/A	N/A
Total!	N/A	N/A	N/A	N/A	88/100
Video Games (DE)	N/A	75%	N/A	74%	74%
Sega Saturn Magazine	N/A	N/A	86%	N/A	N/A

Award
Publication	Award
GamePro (1995)	Best 32X Game

RePlay reported WWF WrestleMania: The Arcade Game was the third most-popular arcade game at the time. Bruised Lee of GamePro gave the arcade version a positive review, particularly praising the "unmatched" level of detail in the digitized characters, the wacky sense of humor, and the accessible controls. He summarized, "Lose the basketball from NBA Jam, take away the blood from MK, throw in some famous wrestlers, and you have WWF Wrestlemania, one of the most addictive arcade games to date." A reviewer for Next Generation similarly described WWF Wrestlemania as a sort of bloodless Mortal Kombat, and said it is similar to but "much better" than WWF Raw. He applauded the "cleanly digitized" characters, variety of moves, ability to play either head-to-head or two-on-two cooperative, and sense of humor.

The PlayStation version was even more enthusiastically received by critics, who praised the game for having combos which are easy to stumble across, engaging commentary and other sound effects, and an extensive combination of realistic wrestling moves and comical magic moves which tap into the fantasy appeal of wrestling. GamePro's Scary Larry gave it a 4.5/5 for control and a perfect 5/5 in every other category (graphics, sound, and FunFactor), calling it "a great wrestling game, a great fighting game, and a great as-fun-to-watch-as-it-is-to-play game." A reviewer for Next Generation opined that it "looks great and plays even better." The two sports reviewers of Electronic Gaming Monthly both gave it a 9 out of 10 and an "Editor's Choice Platinum" award, and remarked, "[Acclaim and Williams] have turned out the lights on anyone thinking of making a wrestling game for the PlayStation."

Scary Larry said the 32X version is "no match for the PlayStation title" and lacks many of the sound samples of the arcade version, but at least has better graphics than the Genesis and Super NES versions, and overall is a must-have for 32X owners. GamePro's Air Hendrix commented that the Genesis version suffers from "excessive graininess" and conspicuous slowdown, and that the gameplay is somewhat shallow. He nonetheless found the game is enjoyable and outshines earlier wrestling games for the system. Scary Larry said that while it would be unfair to compare it to the PlayStation version, the Super NES version does not compare well even to the Genesis version. He criticized the reduced character roster, slow game speed, smaller sprites, and tinny sound effects.

Scary Larry described the Saturn port as an "almost flawless" conversion of the PlayStation version, with the only shortcomings being some graininess around the edges and slowdown in the cooperative mode. However, he also said it was a disappointment that there was nothing new in this version despite it coming out almost a year after the PlayStation version. Rob Allsetter of Sega Saturn Magazine maintained that it was "worth the wait", applauding the gameplay and humor. He remarked that the key to the game's excellence is "its immediate accessibility. After about five minutes you'll find yourself able to perform some of the most outrageous moves." In 1996, GamesMaster ranked the Mega Drive Version 10th on their "The GamesMaster Mega Drive Top 10" In the same issue, GamesMaster ranked the SNES version 10th in their "The GamesMaster SNES Top 10."

== See also ==
- List of licensed wrestling video games
