= SingleTrac =

American video game developer

SingleTrac Entertainment Technologies, Inc.
- Type: Public
- Industry: Software & programming
- Founded: 1994
- Founder: Mike Bartholomew; Todd Kelly; Michael Ryder
- Defunct: 2000
- Fate: Closed by GT Interactive as part of an acquisition by Infogrames
- Headquarters: Salt Lake City, Utah
- Products: Twisted Metal franchise Jet Moto franchise
- Parent: GT Interactive (1997–2000)

SingleTrac Entertainment Technologies, Inc. was an American video game developer. It was founded in March 1994 by Michael Ryder, Todd Kelly, and Michael Bartholomew, who were former employees of Evans & Sutherland, bringing their 3D graphics and software engineering skills into the video game industry. The company, in the late summer of 1994 then signed a deal with Sony Imagesoft for development of two games for the newly-launched PlayStation, and Sony Electronic Publishing provided funding for the company. Its most famous titles were the Twisted Metal and Jet Moto video game series. At its heyday, it was closely associated with Sony Computer Entertainment, with whom they produced the above two series.

The company's first two games, WarHawk and Twisted Metal, were major critical and commercial successes, leading publisher Sony Computer Entertainment to contract two further games from SingleTrac. SingleTrac had ambitions of becoming a video game publisher as well as developer. In early 1997, the company signed a deal with Microsoft to enable them to publish PC games, but these plans never came to fruition. Later in 1997, SingleTrac signed on as a developer for the Nintendo 64, but they ultimately never produced any Nintendo 64 games. After producing the two contracted games for Sony Computer Entertainment, due to disputes, as Sony still owns the rights to its SingleTrac creations up to this point, SingleTrac was bought by the video game publisher GT Interactive. It was closed down in 2000 before GT Interactive itself was bought out by Infogrames.

== Lineage ==
A group of SingleTrac employees broke off and formed the game studio Incognito Entertainment in 1999, and went on to make some additional entries in the former SingleTrac franchise Twisted Metal and a sequel to SingleTrac's first game WarHawk, both for Sony Computer Entertainment. In 2009, most of the team members left Incognito to form Eat Sleep Play and LightBox Interactive, rendering Incognito defunct. Both studios would go on to develop the same two former SingleTrac franchises Incognito made entries in - Eat Sleep Play developed a PS3 entry in the Twisted Metal series and LightBox Interactive developed a spiritual successor to the Warhawk series, Starhawk. Eat Sleep Play transitioned to mobile development right before releasing its PS3 entry in the Twisted Metal series and shutting down in 2017. LightBox Interactive's contract with Sony expired right after the release of Starhawk and is considered defunct since 2012.

== Developed games ==
| Year | Title | Platform |
|---|---|---|
| 1995 | WarHawk | PlayStation |
| 1995 | Twisted Metal | PlayStation |
| 1996 | Twisted Metal 2 | PlayStation; PC |
| 1996 | Jet Moto | PlayStation; PC |
| 1997 | Jet Moto 2 | PlayStation |
| 1997 | Critical Depth | PlayStation |
| 1998 | Rogue Trip: Vacation 2012 | PlayStation |
| 1998 | Streak: Hoverboard Racing | PlayStation |
| 1998 | Outwars | PC |
| 2000 | Animorphs: Shattered Reality | PlayStation |
