= Warhawk (1995 video game) =

Combat flight simulation video game

Warhawk: The Red Mercury Missions
- North American cover art
- Developers: SingleTrac; Sony Interactive Studios America
- Publisher: Sony Computer Entertainment
- Platform: PlayStation
- Release: NA: November 10, 1995; PAL: December 15, 1995
- Genre: Combat flight simulation
- Mode: Single-player

Warhawk, subtitled The Red Mercury Missions, released as AirAssault (エア・アサルト, Ea Asaruto) in Japan, is a 1995 combat flight simulation video game developed by SingleTrac and Sony Interactive Studios America, published by Sony Computer Entertainment for the PlayStation. It was originally released on November 10, 1995, in North America and a month later elsewhere. A Windows version was planned for release in 1996 but was cancelled.

Warhawk was well received by critics and was re-released as part of Sony's Greatest Hits line-up. It was released on the PlayStation Network in North America in 2007 and elsewhere in 2012. A multiplayer-only remake of the game, developed by Incognito Entertainment, was released in 2007 for the PlayStation 3.

== Gameplay ==
Gameplay screenshot

Warhawk is a vehicle simulation game built around a futuristic VTOL craft. The player maneuvers with 360 degrees of flight control through six levels. Weapons include fire-off lock-ons, rockets, multi-fire swarmers, and plasma cannons. The game has no multiplayer capabilities and does not feature DualShock or analog controller support.

There are no saving or loading features. Instead, a password is presented each time a level is completed. The game ends after its six levels are completed, or when the player's craft can no longer fly. This occurs if the craft takes heavy damage, gets stuck in narrow places or the player ejects from their craft. The craft is teleported to base, repaired, and sent back to the stage for the first two times this happens; on the third time, the game ends.

Enemies in the game vary from tanks and aircraft to massive fixed gun emplacements and futuristic robots. In certain areas of the game, enemies continuously respawn to challenge the player until they complete the mission objective. A version of the Warhawk craft itself is the final boss in Twisted Metal: Black.

== Plot ==
The plot of the game centers around a megalomaniac named Kreel who has become a global threat and is threatening various nations with his seemingly unstoppable armies. Players take the role of two pilots named 'Hatch' and 'Walker', who are part of an international force devoted to fighting Kreel and his varied minions. As the campaign progresses, the source of Kreel's power is revealed to be Red Mercury, which provides his forces with their nigh-invulnerability.

The game has various endings depending on what actions the player takes during the final battle, or if the player loses all lives. These include a costly nuclear war, Kreel choking to death on a chicken bone, a happy ending with the protagonists selling "I survived the Red Mercury war" baseball caps, both pilots being served as the main course at Kreel's grand victory ceremony, or Hatch being brainwashed by the Red Mercury and becoming Kreel's willing servant and destroying the mothership and remaining planetary defense forces.

== Development ==
The game was announced at E3 1995. Associate producer/designer Mike Giam explained how the game's basic concept was formed: "We looked at shooters like After Burner and StarFox, and we juxtaposed their arcade feeling with the freedom of a computer flight sim." The game took nine months to develop.

By the end of November 1995 Singletrac had started work on a conversion of Warhawk for Windows 95, with a planned early 1996 release. However, it was cancelled.

== Reception ==
Reception

Review scores
| Publication | Score |
|---|---|
| Edge | 7/10 |
| Electronic Gaming Monthly | 9.125/10 |
| Next Generation | 4/5 |
| Play | 68% |
| Electric Playground | 10/10 |

Warhawk was released to overwhelmingly positive reviews. Critics lauded the precise controls, music, graphics, sound effects, and most especially the freedom and variety afforded by the open 3D world and complex flight controls, though some felt the game was too short.

== See also ==
- Warhawk (2007 video game)
