= Sweet Tooth (Twisted Metal) =

Character from the Twisted Metal video game series

- Twisted Metal character
- First game: Twisted Metal (1995)
- Created by: David Jaffe
- Portrayed by: Robert Goodens (Twisted Metal); Joe Seanoa (TV series)
- Voiced by: J.S. Gilbert (Twisted Metal: Black, Twisted Metal, PlayStation All-Stars Battle Royale); Fred Tatasciore (Twisted Metal: Head-On); Will Arnett (TV series)

Marcus "Needles" Kane—commonly known as Sweet Tooth—is a fictional character from the Twisted Metal video game series. Sweet Tooth is designed around the premise of a killer clown who drives a combat ice cream truck, and his face has been featured on the cover of every Twisted Metal game, making him the series' mascot. The name "Sweet tooth" was originally used as the name of the ice cream truck, but would also be used as a pseudonym for Needles starting with the second game. He is one of only a few characters in the series to drive more than one vehicle: driving "Dark Tooth", "Tower Tooth", and "Gold Tooth" in Twisted Metal: Head-On and its expanded PlayStation 2 port.

The character has gone through several redesigns differing from game to game, similar to fellow character Calypso, and his personality has grown progressively darker along the way. Despite the changes some factors remained uniform, notably the perpetual flame on his head introduced in the second game. Starting with Twisted Metal: Black, his design became a large, somewhat overweight bare chested clown with a mask featuring a maniacal smile. Twisted Metal: Head-On expanded on this idea, changing the mask to face paint and the smile to his own.

== Design and history ==
Sweet Tooth's original look featured him as a green-haired, slim circus clown who had escaped from a mental institution. The design was expanded upon in the second game in response to changes to the truck's design, notably due to the clown head adorning the truck now featuring a personality of its own. The result gave Sweet Tooth the flaming head design seen on the character since. 989 Studios, who handled the next two games, put more emphasis on the clown design, redesigning his attire to that of a ringmaster in Twisted Metal 4; neither design was held in high regard by the developers, with David Jaffe stating his dislike of III's look. As of Black and beyond, the design was modified heavily, giving him increased bulk and other features that would be called his "classic look" by Incog Inc.'s design team.

The ice cream truck was designed before the driver himself, and Black's incarnation took six months and many concept sketches to finalize. Labeled early on "DEMONIC ICE CREAM TRUCK", attention to details such as the head adorning the vehicle and the contents of the back of the truck were focused on during development. Boss variants of the truck have also appeared regularly in the series starting with Dark Tooth in the second game (which was a re-textured version of the original Sweet Tooth vehicle). While the designs for the vehicles have progressed steadily, care has been emphasized to keep them rooted to the simple yet unique ice cream truck structure, something that has become harder and harder for the team as the games go on.

== Appearances ==
=== Twisted Metal (1995) ===
Needles Kane makes his first appearance in the original Twisted Metal. Seen lacking his signature flaming hair, he is decidedly more tame than in future installments. He still has his killer personality, although not as flamboyant. He is portrayed by live-action actor Robert Goodens.

=== Twisted Metal 2 ===
Sweet Tooth returns in Twisted Metal 2, seen for the first time with his familiar personality and flaming head. His wish is to become a bug so he no longer has to live a life where he needs to kill people. He is a secret character, able to be battled in Story Mode, but is only playable with a cheat code. This is the first game in the series where Needles is interchangeably referred to as "Sweet Tooth" and "Needles Kane". This game also sees the debut of Marcus, who is revealed in later games to be Sweet Tooth's split personality.

=== Twisted Metal III ===
Sweet Tooth undergoes a radical change from Twisted Metal 2 to Twisted Metal III, from sinister stalker to maniacal psychopath. His updated look in this installment plays up the circus side of his personality, giving him a more clownish look and a great fascination with ice cream and candy. This is one of two Twisted Metal games besides the original where he does not have flaming hair, instead having styled orange hair that resemble flames, the other being in TMSB. As in TM2, he is a secret character, but the player only needs to beat the game to unlock him, or input a secret code.

=== Twisted Metal 4 ===
In Twisted Metal 4, Sweet Tooth returns, now as the master of the Twisted Metal tournament, having overthrown Calypso. He is more of a ringmaster than a clown in this installment, but oddly remains silent for the entirety of the game, instead having one of his clown minions speak for him. He is the final boss of TM4, and is considered one of the most difficult bosses in the series. Sweet Tooth's special attack in TM4 is considered by fans to be the most overpowered of any Special Weapon in the entire series. Because he is the final boss, he does not have a unique ending, instead sharing the generic ending with the other unlockable bosses and the custom cars.

=== Twisted Metal: Black and Twisted Metal: Lost ===
In Twisted Metal: Black (a reboot of the series), Sweet Tooth had a big make-over design-wise, giving him a more maniacal homicidal appearance. His personality also changed and became much darker. His background was expanded upon, stating he was a wanted mass murderer that survived the electric chair, to later end up at the Blackfield Asylum. It is revealed that the flames on his head were product of a curse imposed by the Black character Preacher, the driver of Brimstone, before execution. He was cursed with the burden of the fires of Hell upon his head, which burns him endlessly and causes him pain.

Calypso offers to remove the fire from Sweet Tooth as a prize. However, in his ending Calypso reveals that in order to break the curse, he would have to renounce his obsession of murdering innocents, to which Sweet Tooth responds by killing Calypso himself. Sweet Tooth also has an unnamed younger brother who drives Yellow Jacket alongside a dead zombified Charlie Kane. Due to the surreal setting of Black and its apparent disconnection from the mainstream games, the game's plot is considered an alternative story-line. It is also implied by Minion that the game takes place in Sweet Tooth's mind.

In Twisted Metal: Lost, it is said in the bio of Yellow Jacket that his brother and Charlie were attempting to kill Needles, then themselves, to "end the bloodline of generations of murderers and psychopaths." An alternate form of Sweet Tooth's truck is unlockable: a more powerful version painted gold called "Gold Tooth".

=== Twisted Metal: Small Brawl ===
Sweet Tooth returns as a car in the child-themed spin-off game Twisted Metal: Small Brawl, based on RC cars instead of real ones. In this game, Sweet Tooth is the youngest and most mischievous kid in the contest, and enters looking for some ice cream. His ending shows that Calypso offers him an ice cream from his familiar Ice Cream truck, but Sweet Tooth instead steals the truck to terrorize Calypso.

=== Twisted Metal: Head-On ===
In Twisted Metal: Head-On, it is revealed that he is the split personality of Marcus Kane, the driver of Roadkill. As with Twisted Metal 4, his goal in this tournament is to take over Twisted Metal itself—in his ending, he claims that he has participated in (and won) many previous tournaments, but now he wants a change. In this tournament, if Marcus gives into his persona, the two become the driver of "Dark Tooth" and "Tower Tooth", the game's two final bosses. In this game, he is voiced by Fred Tatasciore.

=== Twisted Metal (2012) ===
In the 2012 reboot, he generally goes by "Sweet Tooth" or "Marcus Kane", while only his followers still refer to him as Needles. His passion for finding "the one that got away"—the only one of his would-be victims that managed to escape alive—is the driving force of his story and his motivation for entering the new Twisted Metal tournament.

His real name is Marcus Kane, a middle-aged man who lived a decent life. Happily married and a father of four, he worked as an ice cream salesman, handing out treats from his future demolition vehicle. However, a small part of him was filled with resentment and hatred for his mundane life, eventually manifesting as a split personality. This dark side, dubbed "Needles", began eating at the edges of Marcus' sanity, trying to convince him to set it free.

After an unknown period of time, Marcus finally gave in to Needles' demands, externalizing the facet of himself by creating a macabre clown mask. Unfortunately, this allowed Needles to subdue or destroy Marcus' personality, effectively bringing the man's repressed madness and sadism to the forefront. To celebrate his new freedom, the newly-named Sweet Tooth donned the clown mask (somehow setting his head ablaze in the process) and decided to murder "his" family.

Marcus' wife, youngest son and baby were quickly slaughtered, but Sweet Tooth took his time with his daughter. He would later admit this was a mistake, as it gave the girl time to grab a pair of large scissors and drive them towards the mad clown's right eye (hitting just under). As Sweet Tooth reeled in pain, Sophie fled into the night, becoming the first—and only—person that survived Sweet Tooth's murderous urges.

Infuriated at this turn of events, Sweet Tooth vowed to find his daughter and "make her BLEED". He began roaming the world in his ice cream truck—modified for combat and destruction—in search of the one that got away. At one point, he was able to track Sophie to a hospital, but found no sign of her beyond the "scent of her fear". On the other hand, Sweet Tooth took great pleasure in slaughtering everyone that got in his way on the way up, musing that "it was like Christmas morning: every hallway filled with little, tiny, blood-filled gifts".

After killing yet another woman on the hunt for Sophie, Sweet Tooth decides to enter Calypso's latest Twisted Metal contest, intent on using his wish to finally catch up with his elusive prey. During the competition, his main opponents are The Skulls, led by Mr. Grimm. In the final battle of the tournament, Sweet Tooth was pitted against The Brothers Grimm, but managed to emerge victorious at the cost of his gunner's life. After he wins the contest, Sweet Tooth wishes for Calypso to send him to Sophie's hiding place. As Calypso summons his powers, Sweet Tooth awakens to find himself in a coffin, complete with a blackened skeleton lying on top of him. Calypso reveals that Sophie has been dead for ten years; her mind broken by the murder of her family, she committed suicide long before her father found the hospital she had lived in since that night. Infuriated at Calypso's trickery, Sweet Tooth futilely attempts to escape his daughter's coffin while swearing to kill him, but he is far too deep in the ground to make any progress. As a final insult, Calypso spray-paints "Sweet Tooth" on Sophie's tombstone, leaving the murderous clown to die.

At the end of the game (during the credits), it is revealed that Sweet Tooth realized that his oldest son was hiding very close to where he had his final confrontation with Sophie. Despite this, the killer chose to spare Charlie Kane, leading the latter to see himself as the heir to his father's work. Having apparently heard of Sweet Tooth's passing, Charlie made good on his destiny by digging up Sophie's coffin, containing both her and her father, and retrieving the clown mask. Donning the mask and setting his own head alight, Charlie set off in Sweet Tooth's old truck, swearing to avenge his father's murder by doing the same to Calypso.

Later still, Calypso himself visited the grave, musing that Sweet Tooth had impacted Sophie in a way that gave her great potential for causing pain. Deciding to make use of the girl's rage and hatred, Calypso resurrected Sophie as a female version of her father, right down to the mask and flaming scalp.

=== Other media ===
Sweet Tooth is also an unlockable character in War of the Monsters (2003) for the PlayStation 2, a game in which Incognito used the TM:B engine to make a movie monster fighting game. One of the characters, Agamo, has Sweet Tooth as the fourth skin. To unlock it, the player must beat the story mode of Twisted Metal: Black with Sweet Tooth and have the save on the memory card. Sweet Tooth is represented by a tall mech with the signature flaming clown head, and often breaks out in his usual laughter throughout the game.

Sweet Tooth appears as a playable character in the crossover fighting game for the PlayStation 3, PlayStation All-Stars Battle Royale.

Sweet Tooth's ice cream truck appears as a vehicle customization in the 2015 Psyonix game Rocket League.

In the television series, he is physically portrayed by Joe Seanoa and voiced by Will Arnett. Marcus Kane is shown to have once been a child actor who suffered a mental breakdown on air and stabbed his canine costar Billy to death with a knitting needle, earning him the name "Needles" Kane. He spent the rest of his life in various mental institutions until the apocalypse, when he murdered his mother and stepfather and lived alone in an abandoned Las Vegas resort until the events of the series.

== Reception ==
Sweet Tooth was placed second by Joystick Division on its list of "The Top Ten Video Game Clowns Of All Time", remarking he "has become one of the most recognizable figures in the Playstation portion of the video game world", while GamesRadar listed him as one of the scariest clowns in videogames, stating he is "[p]erhaps the only other whiteface to rival Kefka in terms of fame, the rampaging maniac of Twisted Metal has become the franchise's principal icon", and PlayStation Official Magazine ranked him as the seventh best clown on PlayStation. IGN called him one of the most notorious anti-heroes in gaming, saying "there's no real good guy in the Twisted Metal series" but that "Sweet Tooth ... stands out as a figurehead amongst this crew".

GameSpy placed him third in their 2001 list of top villains in games. He was included in GameSpot's "All Time Greatest Video Game Villain" contest and reached the "Sinister Sixteen" round before losing to Sarah Kerrigan. Sweet Tooth was elected the 25th coolest videogame character by Entertainment Weekly. UGO Networks ranked him as the second "Best Twisted Metal Characters and Their End Game Videos", adding "[i]f there was a psychopathic clown college, the Joker would be the dean and Sweet Tooth would be its top professor". In 2013, Complex included him among the 25 greatest video game mascots at the number 21, saying that "inhabiting our nightmares is certainly one way to become an effective mascot".

== Legal issues ==
In 2005, Frosty Treats, Inc., a novelty ice cream truck franchise that was the largest in the United States until its closure in 2019, filed a lawsuit against Sony contending that Sweet Tooth infringed on the company's trademarks for their "Safety Clown", a decal on their ice cream trucks. It is an image of a clown that directs children to cross the street behind the truck so that passing cars are more likely to see them. Frosty Treats' CEO, Carl S. Long III, stated in testimony that "they don't look the same way, but if the Safety Clown had a brother who was nasty and mean, it would look somewhat like Sweet Tooth". In Frosty Treats, Inc. v. Sony Computer Entertainment America, Inc., the U.S. Court of Appeals for the Eighth Circuit ruled against the trademark claim because, even if Sweet Tooth was derivative, it was unlikely to cause confusion among consumers.
