= Guy-Roger Duvert =

French film music composer, film director and author

- Occupations: Film composer, Director, Author
- Website: http://www.grduvert.com/

Guy-Roger Duvert is a French film composer, film director and author.

== Early life and education ==
Born and raised in Paris, France, after studies of political sciences in Strasbourg, and at the ESSEC Business School he started a career as a film music composer.

== Career ==
The first feature film he scored, Les Yeux Secs by Narjiss Nejjar, was nominated at the Cannes Festival, at the Quinzaine des Realisateurs.

He is also a film director. He is mostly known for his Science fiction feature film Virtual Revolution, released internationally in 2016, starring Mike Dopud, Jane Badler, Jochen Hägele and Maximilien Poullein.

Duvert made his debut as a novelist in 2019, with the release in France of Outsphere, which won one of the French Amazon awards that year, called Plumes Francophones.

== Bibliography ==
- Outsphere (2019)
- Outsphere 2 (2020)
- Backup (2020)
- Virtual Revolution 2046 (2020)
