= Twisted Metal (disambiguation) =

Twisted Metal can refer to:

- Twisted Metal, a video game series
  - Twisted Metal (1995 video game), the first game in the series
  - Twisted Metal (2012 video game), a reboot of the series
  - Twisted Metal (TV series), a TV series adaptation
- "Twisted Metal" (Highway Thru Hell), a 2024 television episode
- Twisted Metal, a novel of the Robot Wars / Penrose series by Tony Ballantyne
