= Twisted Metal (2012 video game) =

Vehicular combat game

- Developer: Eat Sleep Play (Note: Additional work by Santa Monica Studio)
- Publisher: Sony Computer Entertainment
- Director: David Jaffe
- Producer: Scott Campbell
- Designers: David Jaffe; Scott Campbell
- Series: Twisted Metal
- Platform: PlayStation 3
- Release: NA: February 14, 2012; AU: March 8, 2012; EU: March 16, 2012
- Genre: Vehicular combat
- Modes: Single-player, multiplayer

Twisted Metal is a 2012 vehicular combat video game developed by Eat Sleep Play and published by Sony Computer Entertainment for the PlayStation 3. It is the second reboot of the Twisted Metal series, following Twisted Metal: Black. The game was originally planned to be released in October 2011, but was delayed to early 2012.

== Gameplay ==
The game focuses heavily on multiplayer vehicular combat, including various online game modes with up to 4 player split-screen and 16-players online (the online gameplay was discontinued in early 2019).

For example, the Nuke Mode is a new online game mode where the players choose a faction to play against an opposing faction. In this mode, each faction has a giant metal statue that is being held in the air by a helicopter, which the opposing team must try to destroy. In order to destroy these statues, the player must abduct the enemy team's leader, then sacrifice the leader to a missile launcher that will, in turn, launch a nuclear missile. The person who sacrifices the leader and launches the missile has to control it to hit the opposing teams statue in the air. In order to win the opposing team has to repeat the process 3 times before the statue is destroyed for a team to win.

There are four factions: the Clowns, the Dolls, the Skulls, and the Holy Men. The former having been announced as being inspired by Sweet Tooth and Dollface. The latter are led by Mr. Grimm and the Preacher respectively.

== Plot ==
=== The Twisted Fate of Sweet Tooth the Clown ===
The first arc features Sweet Tooth, also known as "Needles Kane", a demented clown-themed serial killer. Formerly known as Marcus Kane, a family man working out of an ice cream truck, he developed dissociative identity disorder and became possessed by his dark side, embodied in his clown mask. After slaughtering his own family, Sweet Tooth became obsessed with finding "the one that got away", revealed to be his daughter Sophie, to finish the job he started years ago. The mid-story cinematic reveals that he came close to finding her in the psychiatric ward of a hospital (having slaughtered his way through the building to reach it), only to find she had checked out only moments before. Frustrated, Sweet Tooth decides to enter the Twisted Metal contest, intent on having Calypso send him to wherever his daughter is hiding. After destroying the Brothers Grimm (who drive oversized monster trucks), Sweet Tooth confronts Calypso in his massive skyscraper headquarters, the Calypso Industries tower. He demands that Calypso send him to his daughter, only to be transported to a long-buried coffin; Calypso reveals that Sophie has been dead for ten years, as the trauma of Sweet Tooth's massacre drove her to suicide. Swearing revenge on Calypso's treachery (even though he himself specifically wished to be "taken to where Sophie was"), Sweet Tooth futilely pounds on the lid of Sophie's coffin; above ground, his alias has been spray-painted on Sophie's tombstone.

=== Mr. Grimm's Dark Trip Back ===
The second arc features Daniel Grimm, a violent biker determined to go back to the past and prevent his father, a noted stuntman, from performing the stunt that killed him, saving his life and hopefully putting Daniel's own future back on track. Eventually, Mr. Grimm wins the competition by defeating Iron Maiden, a titanic Dollface mecha. As per his wish, Calypso sends him back in time to before the accident occurred. Grimm is sent back in adult form and finds himself inside a pickup truck with his younger self and father; when the father sees the intruder, a struggle ensues that causes a crash, killing the father. Young Grimm kills his future self with a handgun under the car seat. As a dying Grimm muses that he would've done the same thing if the roles were reversed, his body fades away, implying that the young boy will grow into the same future that his older self was trying to prevent.

=== The Madness of Dollface ===
The third and final arc features Krista Sparks, also known as "Dollface". A narcissistic, obsessive, and violent woman seeking to become a famous supermodel, Krista is willing to do anything, including sabotaging and even killing off her competition. When she gets injured in a car crash, her perfectionist mind sees that her face has been horribly disfigured, causing her to seek out a doctor; the doctor hides her face behind a mask, promising after six days she will be beautiful again. After six days have passed, Krista finds the doctor's office to have vanished, and that the mask will not come off. This leads to her entrance into the Twisted Metal tournament, intent on wishing the mask away and resuming her career. At the end of the tournament, Krista faces off against Sweet Tooth's Carnival of Carnage, a clown-themed mobile fortress built by fanatical followers of the late Sweet Tooth in his memory. Brought before Calypso, she rethinks her wish to be famous rather than free from the mask; thus, Krista wishes to be on "the world's biggest runway", bent on becoming the most famous supermodel in the world. Calypso grants this wish by transporting Krista to an airport runway as she failed to specify her wish. Krista attempts to run away from a landing airplane, but her boot heel breaks, causing her to trip over and get crushed by the plane's landing gear. Ironically, the mask finally comes off upon impact.

=== The Preacher's Quest ===
Throughout the game, an enigmatic figure known as "The Preacher" seeks to defeat Calypso. He is first heard on a radio talk show, insisting that Calypso is a powerful demonic entity seeking to drive the world into ruin; the talk show host agrees that times are bad, but dismisses the Preacher's claims. Later, the Preacher is seen outside the Calypso Industries building, declaring that he knows who Calypso truly is; as he says this, the building briefly flashes to a more demonic form. The Preacher vows to free the souls trapped by Calypso and lead them to defeat the tournament host; above, Calypso is seen in his office looking at the Preacher menacingly, briefly emitting his demonic aura.

=== Epilogue ===
The final ending of the game shows the Preacher sitting in a padded cell, apparently within a psychiatric ward. As he swears in the name of God that he will stop Calypso, the camera pans out to reveal that he is imprisoned within a demonic structure, surrounded by hundreds of other tormented individuals. The scene pans out to reveal the prison within the large castle painting on the wall of Calypso's office, implying that Calypso has been trapping the souls of his tournament's victims, as well as imprisoning everyone who protests the tournament. After showing a few new items in the display case – Sweet Tooth's machete, the license plate from Daniel's father's truck, and Krista's doll mask – the building is shown from the outside, briefly flashing to its demonic form as the scene cuts to black.

=== Credits ===
After part of the credits, a man approaches Sophie's grave. He is revealed to be her brother, Charlie Kane, another survivor of Sweet Tooth's massacre. Over the years, he has come to believe that his father left him alive to act as an heir; if anything happened to Sweet Tooth, he would be able to take his place. Now that his father is dead, Charlie has come to claim his legacy; he digs up Sophie's coffin, containing both her and Sweet Tooth's remains, and retrieves the clown mask. Charlie dons the mask, sets his head alight, and drives away in his father's ice cream truck, vowing to avenge his father's demise by killing Calypso.

At the end of the credits, Calypso himself comes to Sophie's open grave, musing that she had great potential to cause pain and destruction. Throwing a sack into the grave, he resurrects Sophie in an outfit similar to her father, seemingly to serve as his loyal enforcer. As Calypso asks if she is ready, Sophie lifts her head, revealing red eyes behind her demonic clown mask.

== Development ==
Twisted Metal was in development for three years. In early stages of the game, the background setting for Twisted Metal was in a post-apocalyptic wasteland. The name of the project was tentatively titled, Twisted Metal: Apocalypse. This idea was later dropped, due to co-director, Scott Campbell, not being in favor for this post-apocalyptic version of the franchise. The game began development as a downloadable PlayStation Network title, similar to David Jaffe's previous Calling All Cars! title. Sony Computer Entertainment was impressed by the title and requested for the title to be expanded into a full retail game. The development of the title then shifted from a PlayStation Network game to a "(USD)$39 product" which was multiplayer-only, similar to 2007's Warhawk and 2008's SOCOM U.S. Navy SEALs: Confrontation. Sony then requested for the game to contain a single-player mode with a story element, while Sony's marketing department said: "Yeah, you guys don't realize how many fans love the Twisted Metal universe, you gotta give us the stories".

The game was first unofficially announced to be developed by Jaffe and his new company, Eat Sleep Play, developing a new title in the Twisted Metal franchise for the PlayStation 3. The announcement, not officially confirmed by Sony, came from a hidden message that was decoded in the Twisted Metal: Head-On "Dark Past" documentary where groups of numbers appeared on screen at points during the video which corresponded to letters of the alphabet. When deciphered, the message reads "Twisted Metal is coming on PS3". The title of the game is believed to have been displayed various times throughout the documentary which is the original Twisted Metal logo but in colors of rustic browns and yellows.

For two years, Sony would not officially confirm the existence of the game, and upon further questioning on multiple occasions Jaffe would insistently decline to comment further, and in general refused to officially announce the title of Eat Sleep Play's first major game until Sony was ready for him to do so. Despite this, rumors persisted heavily that Eat Sleep Play was indeed developing another Twisted Metal. While presenting an award at the AIAS Interactive Achievement Awards ceremony in the States, a heckler in the crowd yelled, "Twisted Metal!", to which Jaffe replied: "Soon. Eight or nine months". In the months leading up to the Electronic Entertainment Expo of 2010, rumors surfaced that a new Twisted Metal would be titled under the names of either Twisted Metal X or Twisted Metal: Harbor City, the same name as the cancelled sequel to Twisted Metal: Black. In response to this, Jaffe posted on his Twitter, which he later confirmed in an email to the games site Joystiq that Eat Sleep Play was not working on a new Twisted Metal game.

At the very end of Sony's E3 2010 press conference, a surprise live-action teaser trailer was shown, with no previous indication as to what it was, that revealed a new Twisted Metal game. The trailer was followed up by a real-life replica of the character Sweet Tooth's ice cream truck driving onto the stage, driven by a man in a Sweet Tooth costume (based on Twisted Metal: Black). David Jaffe and Scott Campbell appeared out of the back, revealed that Eat Sleep Play was in fact developing a new Twisted Metal game, simply entitled Twisted Metal, and then proceeded to give a gameplay demonstration. After the press conference, a blog post went up on the official PlayStation web site by Jaffe explaining why he had outright lied about the existence of Twisted Metal for PS3 and Eat Sleep Play's involvement. He explained that he felt E3 was a show all about joyful surprises, and that because of the internet, those were becoming increasingly rare. In light of this, Sony approached him to make a surprise E3 announcement, and he decided to do whatever it took to keep it a surprise in hopes that the fans of the series would experience such a reaction of joy and wonder. At E3, Jaffe and Campbell further detailed the new online multiplayer mode, and gave the official tentative 2011 release date.

== Music ==
Contributions for the soundtrack included Michael Wandmacher, Larry Lalonde (Primus), Dan Monti, Sascha Dikiciyan, Brain, Melissa Reese and Buckethead.

== Marketing and release ==
Prior to its release, Twisted Metal was marketed and promoted heavily through the use of numerous Internet and TV trailers. In addition, Sony offered anyone who logged into the Shoot My Truck website on February 13 and 14 the opportunity to activate an M249-SAW aimed at the Sweet Tooth truck Sony constructed to promote the series. For marketing considerations, the original release date of the game was pushed back to apply some "extra time, polish, and love". In addition, Twisted Metal creator David Jaffe asked fans to help pick what goes on the back of the box by voting for one of a number of choices.

Buyers of the first batch of copies (Limited Edition) received a voucher to download Twisted Metal: Black for free. It is not a high-definition remake, but rather a port of the original PlayStation 2 version, lacking the online function that was added in a later re-release. In addition, every copy of Twisted Metal included a voucher to download the Sweet Tooth Outcast multiplayer skin for Starhawk. Sony collaborated with several retail outlets on a pre-order bonus (early access to Axel) available through several store chains throughout the world.

=== Online pass ===
Justin Trease, Twisted Metal's QA lead, confirmed to press at CES that the game comes equipped with an online pass code system – a system that requires players who purchased used copies of the game to purchase a pass to access online features. Twisted Metal creator David Jaffe hoped to avoid implementing an online pass for the game, but said it was not his decision. Jaffe acknowledged that an online pass is "probably good business" for publisher Sony, but said it could be counter-productive when trying to earn the trust of gamers.

=== Demo ===
A demo was released in January 2012, featuring eight vehicles to try out in two online modes Deathmatch and Nuke, as well as an offline single-player challenge mode. The servers, as of February 8, 2012, are no longer up and the demo is no longer available.

== Reception ==
Reception

Aggregate score
Aggregator	Score
Metacritic	76/100

Review scores
Publication	Score
1Up.com	B
Destructoid	7/10
Electronic Gaming Monthly	8.5/10
G4	3/5
Game Informer	8.5/10
GameSpot	8/10
GamesRadar+	8/10
GameTrailers	8.1/10
IGN	9/10
Joystiq	3.5/5

Twisted Metal received generally positive reviews. Aggregating review website Metacritic gave the game 76/100.
