= Drawn to Death =

2017 third-person shooter video game

- Developers: The Bartlet Jones Supernatural Detective Agency; San Diego Studio
- Publisher: Sony Interactive Entertainment
- Director: David Jaffe
- Engine: Unity
- Platform: PlayStation 4
- Release: April 4, 2017
- Genre: Third-person shooter
- Mode: Multiplayer

Drawn to Death was a 2017 online multiplayer third-person shooter video game developed by The Bartlet Jones Supernatural Detective Agency and San Diego Studio and published by Sony Interactive Entertainment for the PlayStation 4. Conceptualized by God of War creator David Jaffe, It allows four-player multiplayer in an arena shooter type setting and is reported to be set "inside the pages of a teenager's notebook", as such, it features a hand-drawn-looking visual style.

The Bartlet Jones Supernatural Detective Agency would shut down in 2018, making Drawn to Death its first and last game. Sony announced that the game's servers would be closing on March 25, 2019, rendering the game unplayable.

== Gameplay ==
Drawn to Death was an arena shooter set in a teenager's high school notebook. The world and action embodied the juvenile tone of the child's illustrations. Players would pick a sketched character and drop them into environments drawn upon the book's pages. Each character had its own behaviors, passive tendencies, buffs and special attacks.

Like previous games by David Jaffe, especially the Twisted Metal series, the arenas were made to feature multiple secrets to be used as weapons against enemies. Weapons and gameplay mechanics represent a juvenile tone. One weapon was "a lizard that doubles as a flamethrower," a power-up in the game summons the child's hand to interact in the game world. The action is said to be "fast and frantic, allowing players to sprint, double-jump, and reach high vantage points with ease".

Regarding the potential of a weapon progression system, Jaffe says "skill should be the only determining factor. If you've been playing this for a year, and I just come in and I'm awesome at these types of games, the only reason you should win is you know the map better and are more comfortable muscle memory wise. It should never be because you have better weapons."

== Development ==
Drawn to Death was pitched and has been in development since early 2013. It was announced at the PlayStation Experience keynote opening ceremony on December 6, 2014. Drawn to Death is David Jaffe's first project at his new studio The Bartlet Jones Supernatural Detective Agency. where he acts as director. A trailer was shown with its announcement, and a playable alpha was available. A second promotional video was released on December 11 on Jaffe's YouTube account, where a game character reads through Giant Bomb negative user comments about its announcement and insults them. The game's development budget was $12 million.

== Reception ==
Reception

Aggregate score
Aggregator	Score
Metacritic	56/100

Review scores
Publication	Score
Destructoid	6/10
Game Informer	5/10
GameRevolution	7/10
GameSpot	4/10
IGN	4/10

Drawn to Death received "mixed or average" reviews from critics, according to review aggregator website Metacritic.

IGN awarded Drawn to Death a score of 4 out of 10, saying "Drawn to Death is a mean spirited, misguided mess that falls short mechanically and wants you to feel bad about yourself." Push Square awarded it 8 out of 10, saying "Drawn to Death's juvenile presentation belies a nuanced shooter that's frankly a breath of fresh air." Game Informer awarded it 5 out of 10, saying "After a few matches, most players will be ready to move on to a bigger, better game." GameSpot awarded it a score of 4 out of 10, praising the art style and characters but criticising the physics, ineffectual weapons and attempts at comedy.

The game was a runner-up for the "Worst Game (That We Played)" award at Giant Bomb's Game of the Year 2017 Awards.

In 2022, Jaffe admitted that Drawn to Death failed critically and commercially.
