= Mike Dopud =

Canadian actor, stuntman, and athlete

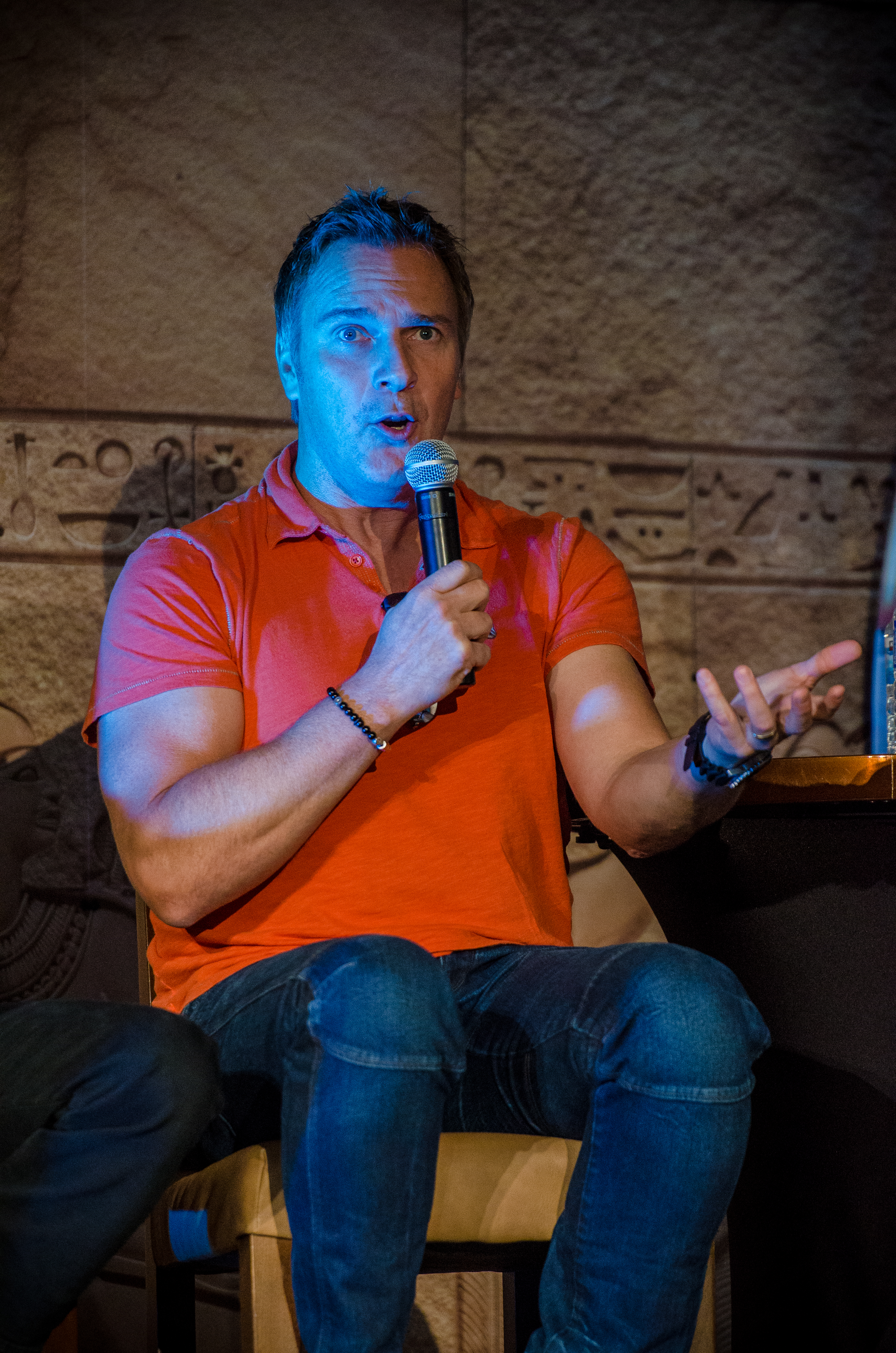
- Born: Majk Dopuđ; Montreal, Quebec, Canada
- Other name: Michel Dopud
- Education: Southern Illinois University
- Occupations: Actor; stuntman; football player

Mike Dopud (Serbian: Majk Dopuđ, Мајк Допуђ) is a Canadian actor, stuntman, and former gridiron football and ice hockey player.

His best known roles include Vic Hadfield in the miniseries Canada Russia '72, Jason Micic on Power, Kimbo Comstock on Arctic Air, Roy McAfee on Cedar Cove, Viktor Mikalek on Arrow, and Michael Vinson on The 100. He also took on several minor roles on Stargate SG-1 and Stargate Atlantis, as well as performing many stunts on both shows, before taking on a bigger role as Varro on Stargate Universe.

He was nominated for a Taurus World Stunt Award in 2005 for his work in Walking Tall.

== Biography ==
Of Serbian descent, Dopud was born in Montreal, Quebec. He attended Southern Illinois University on a football scholarship, earning a degree in physical education. Out of college, he was drafted by the Saskatchewan Roughriders in 1991 as a tailback, but was cut due to injury during the offseason. He later played for the Birmingham Fire. He also played ice hockey for the Gatineau Olympiques and the Columbus Chill.

== Filmography ==
=== Film ===
Year	Title	Role	Notes
1998	The Alley	Driver	
1999	The Silencer	Agent Danner	
1999	The Guardian	Biker	
1999	Fear of Flying	Petr	
2000	Chain of Fools	Dead Guy	
2000	We All Fall Down	Tracey's Cousin	
2001	Black Point	Ray	
2001	Turbulence 3: Heavy Metal	FBI Agent Dave Barret	
2002	Rollerball	Michael 'The Assassin' Uglich	
2002	Lone Hero	Trooper	
2002	Ballistic: Ecks vs. Sever	DIA Agent	
2002	I Spy	Jim	
2003	Bulletproof Monk	Mercenary	
2003	See Grace Fly	Steve	
2004	X2	Prison Guard	Also stunt performer
2004	Walking Tall	Casino Security	
2004	Snowman's Pass	Hugo	
2005	White Noise	Detective Smits	
2005	Alone in the Dark	Agent Turner	
2005	After Tomorrow	Ray	
2005	The Deal	Theo Gorbov	
2005	The Long Weekend	Desk Sergeant Mahoney	
2005	BloodRayne	Gregor	
2005	Chaos	Lamar Galt	
2005	Sub Zero	Dr. Petrov Jenko	
2006	Hollow Man II	Officer Chesley	
2007	Spider-Man 3	Venom-Symbiote Vocal Effects	
2007	In the Name of the King: A Dungeon Siege Tale	General Backler	
2007	Pathfinder	Tracker / Fork In Road	
2007	300	Spartan	Also stunt performer
2007	88 Minutes	Detective	
2007	Shooter	Lead Mercenary	
2007	Seed	Flynn	
2007	Postal	Security Guard	
2007	BloodRayne II: Deliverance	Flinklock Hogan	
2008	Snow Buddies	Joe Bilson	
2008	Ace of Hearts	Mickey Torko	
2008	Ruslan	Boris	
2008	Far Cry	Staff Sergeant Ryder	
2008	Darkness Waits	Cop #2 (voice)	
2009	X-Men Origins: Wolverine	Vietnam Army Officer	
2009	Driven to Kill	Boris	
2009	King of Fighters	CIA Agent	
2009	Night at the Museum: Battle of the Smithsonian	Streltsy	Also stunt performer
2010	A Dangerous Man	Clark	
2010	Altitude	The Colonel	
2011	Rise of the Planet of the Apes	Northside Officer	
2011	Mission: Impossible – Ghost Protocol	Kremlin subcellar hallway Guard	
2011	Final Destination 5	Chef	
2012	This Means War	Ivan	
2013	The Package	Julio	
2013	Tasmanian Devils	Anderson	
2014	X-Men: Days of Future Past	Pinstripe Mafioso	
2014	Skin Trade	Goran Dragovic	
2014	Godzilla	Sailor	Also stunt performer
2016	Project Eden	David Roth	
2016	Virtual Revolution	Nash	
2017	S.W.A.T.: Under Siege	Franklin	
2018	Deadpool 2	Prison Guard	
2018	The Predator	Dupree	
2022	Violent Night	Commander Thorp	
2023	Colorblind	Officer MacMillan	
2023	Mercy	Duncan Jones	
2025	Little Lorraine	Thibault	

=== Television ===
Year	Title	Role	Notes
2004	Battlestar Galactica (2004)	Specialist Gage	
2005	Stargate SG-1	Colonel Ruslan Chernovshev	Season 8, Episode 14: "Full Alert"
2006	Canada Russia '72	Vic Hadfield	TV miniseries
2006	Stargate Atlantis	Genii Guard	Episode: "Coup d'État"
2006–2009	Smallville	George	10 episodes
2007	Kaya	Don	
2007	Stargate SG-1	Odai Ventrell	Season 10, Episode 15: "Bounty"
2009	Durham County	Glen Stuckey	6 episodes
2009	Stargate Atlantis	Kiryk Runner	Episode: "Tracker"
2009	Supernatural	Jim Jenkins	Episode: "Death Takes a Holiday"
2010–2011	Stargate Universe	Varro	15 episodes
2010	Human Target	Mr. Chicago	Season 2, Episode 3
2011	Blue Mountain State	Fin	Season 3, Episode 5
2012	Transporter: The Series	Sujic Drago	Season 1, Episode 4
2012	Battlestar Galactica: Blood & Chrome	Captain Deke Tornvald / Minute Man	
2012	Grimm	Marnassier	2 episodes
2012	Warehouse 13	Mike Madden	Season 4, Episode 5
2012	Halo 4: Forward Unto Dawn	General Black	Web Series
2012	Beauty & the Beast (2012 TV series)	James Mason	Season 1, Episode 5
2012–15	Continuum	Stefan Jaworski	
2013	Mistresses	Oliver Dubois	7 episodes
2013	White Collar	Sergei	Season 5, Episode 6: "Ice Breaker"
2013	Arctic Air	Kimbo Comstock	7 episodes
2013	Covert Affairs	David Dupres	2 episodes
2016	Dark Matter	Arax	4 episodes
2016	Arrow	Viktor	6 episodes
2016	The Strain	Sergei Fetrovski	Episode: "Collaborators"
2017	Criminal Minds: Beyond Borders	Nazmi Dushku	Season 2, Episode 8
2017	iZombie	AK Fortesan	3 episodes
2017–2019	Power	Jason Micic	
2018	The 100	Vinson	
2019	It's Bruno!	Baby	
2021	Turner & Hooch	Walter Hollis	Guest role
2022	Charmed	Earl	1 episode
2023	Checkin' It Twice	Coach Jensen	TV movie
2023	A Zest for Death: A Hannah Swensen Mystery	Sheriff Ron Ealing	TV movie
2024	FBI: Most Wanted	Danil Khadyev	
2024	A Sprinkle of Deceit: A Hannah Swensen Mystery	Sheriff Ron Ealing	TV movie
2025	Reality Bites: A Hannah Swensen Mystery	Sheriff Ron Ealing	TV movie
2025	Pie to Die For: A Hannah Swensen Mystery	Sheriff Ron Ealing	TV movie

=== Video games ===
Year	Title	Role	Notes
2000	Hitman: Codename 47	Additional Voices	uncredited
2000	Spider-Man	Additional Voices	uncredited
2000	Project IGI: I'm Going In	Additional Voices	
2001	Spider-Man 2: Enter Electro	Beetle's laugh 1	
2001	Spider-Man: Mysterio's Menace	Additional Screams	
2001	Twisted Metal: Black	Additional Screams	
2005	Twisted Metal: Head-On	Additional Screams	
2006	Hitman: Blood Money	Additional Voices	uncredited
2006	24: The Game	Additional Voices	
