= Eat Sleep Play =

American video game developer

Eat Sleep Play, Inc.
- Type: Private
- Industry: Game development
- Predecessor: Incognito Entertainment
- Founded: 2007
- Founder: Scott Campbell; David Jaffe
- Defunct: June 26, 2017
- Fate: Moved to Avalanche Software
- Successor: Avalanche Software
- Headquarters: Salt Lake City, Utah, USA
- Key people: Scott Campbell (CEO)
- Products: Twisted Metal

Eat Sleep Play, Inc. was an American video game developer, formed in 2007 by Scott Campbell and David Jaffe, director of the Twisted Metal series and God of War. Eat Sleep Play entered into an exclusive platform deal with Sony requiring the completion of either three console/handheld games or three years of development time, with plans to release its first original game in 2010. The first game released by Eat Sleep Play was a port of the PSP game Twisted Metal: Head On that was retitled Twisted Metal Head-On: Extra Twisted Edition for PlayStation 2 and was not one of the three game console-exclusive deals.

Following his work on Sony Computer Entertainment Santa Monica's God of War (PS2), Scott and Jaffe expressed a desire to focus on smaller-scale, more personal games. They then directed the PlayStation Network game Calling All Cars! (PS3), developed by Incognito.

The company was stationed in Salt Lake City, Utah, USA. The team was largely composed of original members of SingleTrac who made the first two Twisted Metal games.

David Jaffe and Eat Sleep Play developed a new Twisted Metal game, which was released in 2012.

After Jaffe's resignation in 2012, Eat Sleep Play moved into mobile game development. In partnership with Zynga, the companies released Running With Friends, Looney Tunes Dash!, and Ice Age Arctic Blast.

In late 2016, they joined the VR start-up castAR. On June 26, 2017, Eat Sleep Play was shut down along with castAR when it laid off staff and closed its doors and moved to Avalanche Software.

== Games ==
Title	Platform(s)	Release date(s)
Twisted Metal: Head On: Extra Twisted Edition	PlayStation 2	NA: February 5, 2008
Twisted Metal	PlayStation 3	NA: February 14, 2012
Running With Friends	iOS, Android (as Stampede Run)	NA: May 8, 2013
Looney Tunes Dash!	iOS, Android	NA: Dec 17, 2014
Ice Age Arctic Blast	iOS, Android	NA: July 20, 2016
Cars vs Bosses	iOS, Android	NA: February 1, 2017
