= Starhawk (2012 video game) =

2012 video game

- Developer: LightBox Interactive (Note: Additional work by Santa Monica Studio.)
- Publisher: Sony Computer Entertainment
- Designers: Dylan Jobe; Ryan Mudd
- Writer: Koen Wooten
- Composer: Christopher Lennertz
- Platform: PlayStation 3
- Release: NA: May 8, 2012; JP: May 10, 2012; PAL: May 11, 2012
- Genre: Third-person shooter
- Modes: Single-player, multiplayer

Starhawk is a 2012 third-person shooter video game developed by LightBox Interactive and published by Sony Computer Entertainment for the PlayStation 3. It is the spiritual successor to 2007's Warhawk.

== Gameplay ==
The most notable change from Warhawk is the addition of a single-player story mode, which was intended to be included in Warhawk but was eventually removed. The gameplay is similar to Warhawk. A new system called "Build and Battle" allows players to build structures such as bunkers, defenses, and armories in the midst of battle, giving the game a real-time strategy (RTS) element while remaining a third-person shooter. The game includes flying mechs called Hawks. A player respawns into a landing craft which they can steer with in a limited range to reach the battle field. Like Warhawk, there are 32-player online battles (16 vs 16). Starhawk also has a co-operative mode similar in concept to the Horde Mode in the Gears of War franchise.

== Synopsis ==
In the distant future, humans are colonizing other planets across the galaxy. At the same time, humans are mining a valuable energy source called Rift Energy. The Rift Energy miners, known as Rifters, began mining the Rift Energy from the planets of the Outer Spur, but some of the Rifters were exposed to the Rift Energy, which transformed them into savage-like mutants known as Outcasts. The Outcasts, protective of the Rift Energy, attacked Rifter mining sites, including an outpost on the broken planet of Sever, owned by brothers Emmett and Logan Graves. An Outcast war party destroyed their rig, and both brothers became exposed to Rift Energy. Logan, unfortunately, mutated into an Outcast, but Emmett was able to remain human thanks to his friend Sydney Cutter, who created a regulator to implant into Emmett’s spine to keep him from transforming into an Outcast. Emmett and Cutter soon become hired gunslingers who travel from planet to planet to protect the Rifter mining sites from Outcast war bands.

In the small town of White Sands on the planet of Dust, Mayor Jonas asks for Emmett and Cutter’s help to protect the town from an upcoming attack by the Outcast while they fulfill their rift energy quota for the Union, the main authority in the Outer Spur. They agree to help for a price, and are able to push back the attacking Outcasts. The two later find out that the Outcast war party was being led by the notorious Outcast known as the Outlaw, who turns out to be Emmett’s brother Logan. The Outcast appear to be retreating in their ships, and White Sands celebrates. However, the Outlaw and his Outcast group attack a Rifter freight way, leading the captain of the cargo ship to self-destruct the freight way. Emmett and Cutter discover that the citizens of White Sands were taken prisoners by the Outlaw to a nearby moon to be converted into Outcasts. Emmett is able to rescue Mayor Jonas, and the two head back to White Sands which is under attack. Emmett, Cutter, and the remaining White Sands folks are able to defeat the attacking Outcasts, but Jonas is killed in the battle.

Emmett and Cutter head to Sever, the Outlaw’s hideout, to put an end to Logan’s atrocities. Emmett confronts his brother, and he subdues the Outlaw. However, Logan is transformed by the power of the Rift Energy into a large, monstrous Rift entity. Emmett defeats the entity, and Cutter places a rig on top of the Rift Energy source on Sever. Despite losing his brother, Emmett and Cutter continue to make a living by being Rift Salvagers.

== Development ==
In March 2009, Kotaku received unofficial word that the newly created LightBox Interactive was developing a sequel to Warhawk. The game would be a "Warhawk in space", and had already been in development for some time at that point. Warhawk game director and LightBox Interactive president Dylan Jobe would not confirm the rumor, but told Kotaku "It's way too early to comment on anything but I can say that we have some really exciting stuff in development that our Warhawk fans *and* new players will love." In April 2009, Sony trademarked the name "Starhawk", giving further credence to the rumor.

In June 2010, Dylan Jobe tweeted that he was on his way to Sony for a review and playtest of LightBox's next title, and that the reviews with Sony had gone well. Jobe also stated that Starhawk is "very far away" from beta testing after one eager Hawk fan speculated that we could be seeing a Starhawk beta soon. In October 2010, Dylan Jobe stated that the developer "won't rush" its unannounced Sony title and "We don't want to show it before its ready", but adds that it's "making absolutely fantastic progress".

In February 2011, Dylan Jobe hinted that the studio was soon to reveal its secret Sony project. In May 2011, Dylan Jobe tweeted: "The wait is over next Friday..." That was the same day US TV show G4TV planned to reveal a "Sony surprise" in its May 13 show. Further the latest issue of Official PlayStation Magazine speculated in its rumour column that the PS3 exclusive flight-sim would feature "a story-driven campaign with full co-op support".

On May 13, 2011, Sony officially announced the game as Starhawk. It was revealed that the title is being developed by LightBox Interactive in partnership with Sony's Santa Monica studio and will feature the same third-person shooter experience from Warhawk in a variety of new set space settings. While Warhawk was a multiplayer-only experience, Starhawk would feature a full single-player campaign. Further Dylan Jobe revealed the game will support split screen play, but not PlayStation Move.

As of April 2011, there has been an interactive Facebook page for Starhawk, run by the game's chief developer, where Facebook users and Warhawk users alike can suggest ideas on how they would improve gameplay from Warhawk to Starhawk. The developers often ask questions of users, such as "How can we improve the online Multiplayer game experience?" and fans of the page can respond with answers to the question, along with any ideas they may have.

=== Developer ===
LightBox Interactive logo

LightBox Interactive was an American video game developer, founded in January 2009 by former team members of Incognito Entertainment (including Dylan Jobe), developer of titles such as Warhawk, Twisted Metal: Black, and War of the Monsters. From 2010 to 2012 they were engaged in a multi-year, multi-title partnership with Sony Computer Entertainment America developing games for all the PlayStation family of platforms. The studio relocated from Salt Lake City, Utah, to Austin, Texas, in the fall of 2009. On October 17, 2012, it was confirmed that LightBox Interactive's contract with Sony ended and that LightBox laid off 24 employees the day after. Light Box had 32 employees in total. They claimed to be moving to iOS game development, but as of February 15, 2019, no titles have been released nor any news, and LightBox Interactive can be considered defunct.

== Marketing and release ==
Prior to its release, Starhawk was marketed and promoted through the use of numerous Internet and TV trailers. In addition, beta testing was enterable by fans with feedback to the developer. For marketing considerations, a Limited Edition of the game was available exclusively at GameStop as pre-order bonus.

Those who pre-ordered Starhawk through GameStop automatically upgraded to the Limited Edition of the game at no extra cost. The Limited Edition features two DLC packs containing new maps and multiplayer skins, a custom PS3 theme, the soundtrack and a PSN download code for the original Warhawk released on PSone. Pre-orders from HMV include the same extras, other than the Warhawk code.

In season 3 of PlayStation Network's reality show The Tester, Starhawk was a well used part of the show. Episode 6 had a construction challenge, based on the game's "Build n' Battle' feature. The winner of the challenge received a copy of the game signed by Dylan Jobe, the president of LightBox Interactive. Starhawk was then the final challenge in the season finale in which the last three competitors competed in a 4-level obstacle course based on the setting of the game, in which the last level was to complete the game's first campaign mission.

=== Development ===
In November 2011, Sony confirmed its Starhawk private beta test would go live on EU and US PSN on Tuesday, November 22. A selected number of players who had opted-in to receive PlayStation emails on the game's official site and who had played Warhawk were invited to the beta test. The private beta players had access to play Capture the Flag on "a couple of maps", plus access to the game's matchmaking system. The beta closed on January 3, 2012, and the developer stated information gathered during the beta has been "incredibly valuable".

In January 2012, Sony confirmed that the open public beta for Starhawk would kick off on January 17 for PlayStation Plus subscribers. The open beta was not quite open at first however, as the developer intended to roll it out slowly to different users. PlayStation Plus subscribers and closed beta participants got it first on January 17. Holders of the Uncharted 3: Drake's Deception beta keys got it January 31. So-called "early access" codes from Facebook and GameStop would grant access on February 7, and an IGN promotion would see access opened up to more on February 14. Finally, on February 21, the beta opened up to all PSN users.

== Reception ==
The game currently holds a 77 score on Metacritic, indicating generally favorable reviews. IGN awarded the game a 9.0/10 while Game Informer gave it a 7.50/10. Praises included the multiplayer component of the game which was regarded by some reviewers as the 'best multiplayer on the PS3'. Criticisms were leveled at the game's weak story and uninteresting characters.
