= Twisted Metal 4 =

1999 video game

- Developer: 989 Studios
- Publisher: 989 Studios
- Director: Jonathan Beard
- Producers: Jonathan Beard; Darrin Fuller; William Todd
- Programmers: Jim Buck; Mike Riccio; Matthew Titelbaum; William Todd
- Artists: Baz Pringle; Jonathan Beard; Diane Covill; James Doyle; Darrin Fuller; Thai Tran; Nikola Trifunovic; Julius C. Willis III
- Writers: Jonathan Beard; Matthew Titelbaum; William Todd; Julius C. Willis III
- Composer: Chuck Doud
- Series: Twisted Metal
- Platform: PlayStation
- Release: NA: November 16, 1999
- Genre: Vehicular combat
- Modes: Single-player, multiplayer

Twisted Metal 4 is a 1999 vehicular combat game developed and published by 989 Studios and released exclusively in North America for the PlayStation. It is the fourth game in the Twisted Metal series and the second and last developed by 989 Studios.

Players control armed vehicles in enclosed arenas, collecting weapons and using attacks to destroy opposing vehicles. Tournament mode can be played alone or cooperatively by two players, and the Deathmatch mode supports up to four. The game also introduced Create-a-Car, allowing the player to build and save a custom vehicle. The story follows Sweet Tooth after he overthrows Calypso and takes control of the Twisted Metal tournament, with Calypso entering the contest as a driver.

989 Studios developed the game in response to criticism of Twisted Metal III, enlarging the arenas, adding more environmental interaction and revising the vehicle handling. The soundtrack features seven bands, including Rob Zombie, who also appears as a playable contestant.

The game was met with a mixed reception from reviewers, who considered it an improvement over its predecessor but still short of the first two games. They praised the level design, vehicle roster, selection of weapons, visuals, and soundtrack, but were divided on the controls, physics, and multiplayer gameplay. The game sold fewer copies than each of the first three entries. The series continued in 2001 with Twisted Metal: Black, but with reinvention of its characters and story rather than continuing the previous games' narrative.

== Gameplay ==
The player, Quatro's Xeon Hoverbike, engages the Joneses' Family Wagon.

Twisted Metal 4 is a vehicular combat game in which the player selects an armed vehicle and fights other drivers in enclosed arenas until only one remains. The single-player Tournament mode has eight levels, with the player advancing by eliminating all opponents. At the end of each level, the player confronts a boss, usually an enhanced version of past contestants, with Sweet Tooth as the final boss. The player can be accompanied by a second human player or an computer-controlled ally. The latter option allows the player to pool lives. The Deathmatch mode supports one-on-one or multiplayer contests against human or computer-controlled opponents.

Players can select from a starting roster of 13 vehicles with varying attributes, while additional vehicles, including the bosses, can be unlocked using passwords. The Create-a-Car option allows players to customize a vehicle by selecting its body size and style, paint scheme, special weapon, and battle cry. These vehicles can be saved to a memory card. All vehicles carry standard machine guns, while weapon pickups include missiles, napalm that spreads fire on contact, remotely detonated bombs, proximity mines, and multi-warhead "MIRVs". Each vehicle also has its own special attack. Players can also perform "combo attacks" by entering button sequences. Some arenas contain interactive mechanisms and hazards, including a magnet that lifts and drops vehicles and a moving train.

== Plot ==
Twisted Metal begins as a traveling carnival led by Calypso, in which contestants fight in vehicles for a mysterious prize said to be a single wish, while those who lose forfeit their souls. (Note: The first three games, Twisted Metal (1995), Twisted Metal 2 (1996), and Twisted Metal III (1998), have a similar premise, depicting Calypso as the organizer of the tournament and Sweet Tooth as one of its contestants. Twisted Metal 4 introduces the story of Sweet Tooth's takeover.) Calypso claims the souls of defeated contestants, growing stronger with each one, and holds them in a ring. Sweet Tooth first encounters the carnival as a child and follows it until he eventually becomes a contestant. After proving successful in the competition, he wins and asks Calypso to make him the star of Twisted Metal. His desire for prominence eventually turns to envy, and he and a group of clown henchmen overthrow Calypso, taking control of the tournament and the ring.

Under Sweet Tooth, the competition again promises its winner a wish. Calypso enters as a contestant driving a nuclear missile launcher, seeking to reclaim the tournament and his ring. The playable contestants have separate endings based on their wishes rather than a single conclusion to the story. In Calypso's ending, he demands the ring after winning, but Sweet Tooth's henchman refuses to surrender it. Calypso then fights the henchmen and struggles with Sweet Tooth for the ring, causing the souls held within it to escape and destroying their surroundings. A boy later finds the ring among the ruins and sees Calypso and Sweet Tooth still fighting inside it.

== Development and release ==
989 Studios developed Twisted Metal 4 internally, having taken the series in-house for Twisted Metal III after original developer SingleTrac was sold to GT Interactive. The team did not receive the source code used for the first two games, which remained under SingleTrac's ownership. Jonathan Beard directed development and produced the game with Darrin Fuller and William Todd, while Jim Buck served as lead engineer and Chuck Doud as music director.

Programmer Michael Riccio recalled that the project had a development schedule of one year, with the team beginning to work longer hours and weekends after about six months. Buck said the changes to the arenas and handling addressed repeated criticism of Twisted Metal III, in particular its small stages, limited environmental interaction and tendency for vehicles to overturn. By September 1999, the vehicle physics had been revised to allow more airborne stunts, and cars showed visible damage when struck. Other planned additions included larger interactive arenas, new weapons and vehicles, stages made specifically for deathmatch, easier combination attacks and a larger role for Sweet Tooth.

Pre-release plans for vehicle customization included choices of wheels, body style, engine, weapons, call sign and colors. The soundtrack featured seven bands, including Rob Zombie, who also appeared as a contestant driving the Dragula. Twisted Metal 4 was released for the PlayStation on November 16, 1999. A fifth 989 Studios entry was approved after Twisted Metal 4 shipped, but was canceled in December 1999 when the company shifted away from PlayStation games and sequels ahead of the PlayStation 2. The series returned in 2001 with Twisted Metal: Black, but it broke from the earlier games' continuity and instead introduced reworked characters, new backgrounds, and new storylines.

== Reception ==
Reception

Aggregate score
Aggregator	Score
GameRankings	68.04%

Review scores
Publication	Score
AllGame	3.5/5
Electronic Gaming Monthly	7/10, 6.5/10, 5/10, 5/10
EP Daily	6.5/10
Game Informer	9/10
GameFan	69/100
GameSpot	7.1/10
IGN	6/10
Official U.S. PlayStation Magazine	4/5
PlayStation: The Official Magazine	2.5/5

Twisted Metal 4 received mixed reviews from critics, with an average score of 68% from 17 reviews on GameRankings. Reviewers for Game Informer, GameSpot and Official U.S. PlayStation Magazine welcomed its improvements over Twisted Metal III, particularly in its physics, level design and pacing. AllGame considered it an improvement over the third game, but it still preferred Twisted Metal 2. Reviewers for Electronic Gaming Monthly and GameFan were less impressed, criticizing the series for repeating a formula they felt had grown stale.

The controls and physics received differing responses. Game Informer praised the reduced tendency of vehicles to overturn, while IGN criticized their lack of weight and grip. Electronic Gaming Monthly and AllGame also reported that vehicles could become stuck against walls or other scenery. The larger arenas were praised for their varied layouts and interactive features, but GameRevolution found some later stages difficult to navigate. Critics welcomed the new contestants and weapons, but the Create-a-Car feature received qualified praise because of its limited customization options. Two-player modes drew praise, whereas four-player split-screen was criticized for sluggish performance or poor visibility.

Reviewers praised the colorful environments, visible vehicle damage and weapon effects, but graphical pop-up and slowdown also drew criticism. AllGame praised the mix of heavy metal and hip hop music, but GameRevolution complained about repeated songs and GameFan criticized the reused Rob Zombie remixes.

By April 2001, Twisted Metal 4 had sold 465,000 copies, fewer than each of the series' previous three games. In a retrospective that year, Official U.S. PlayStation Magazine acknowledged the game's worthwhile ideas but criticized its rushed release as an attempt to profit from the series' popularity. Series co-creator David Jaffe later suggested that some fans disliked Twisted Metal III and 4 partly because their developers misunderstood the series' fictional setting.
