= Frosty Treats, Inc. v. Sony Computer Entertainment America, Inc. =

2005 United States trademark law case

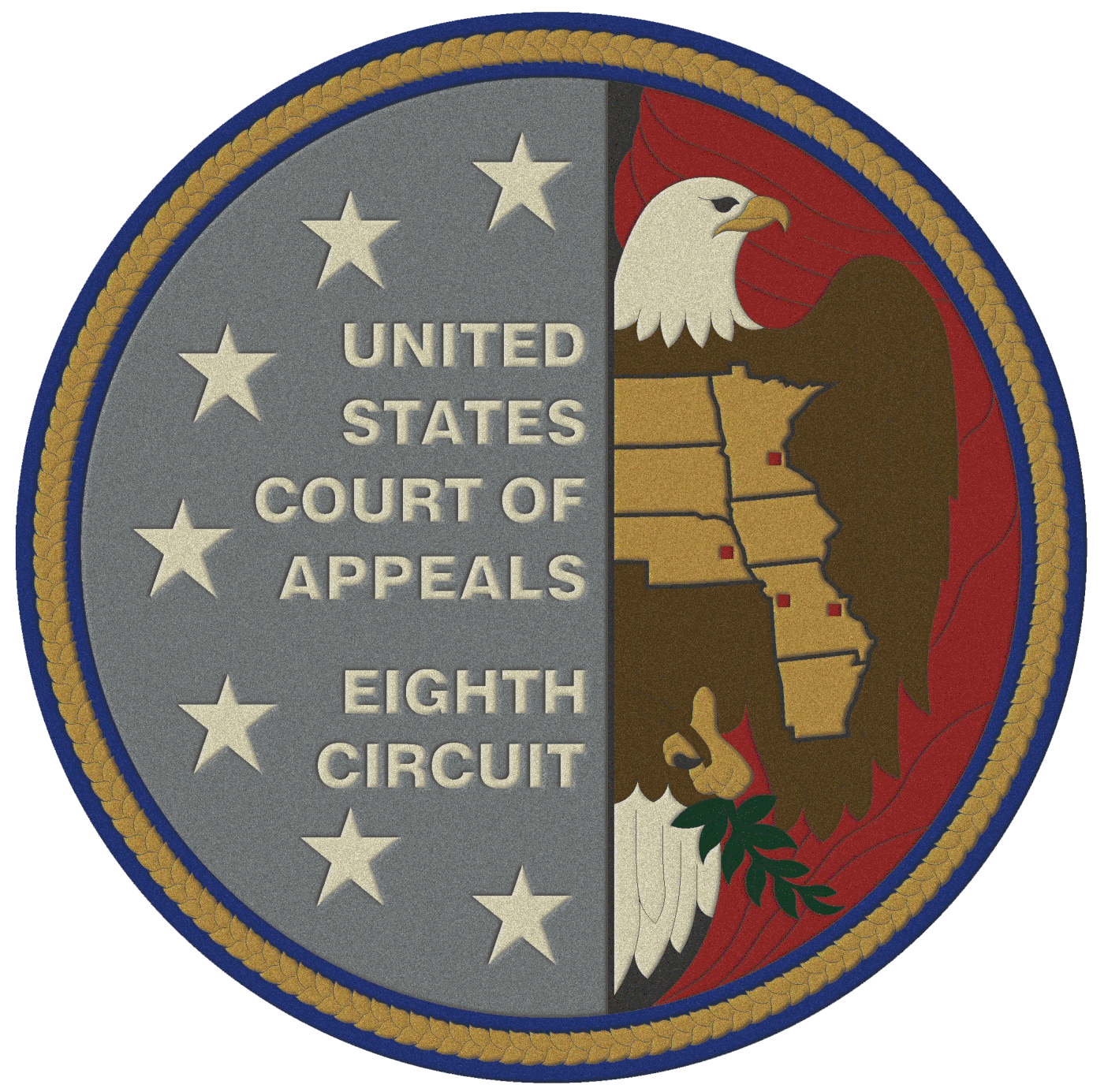
- Court: United States Court of Appeals for the Eighth Circuit
- Full case name: Frosty Treats, Inc.; Frosty Treats of Louisville, Inc.; Frosty Treats Wholesale, Inc.; Frosty Treats of Atlanta, Inc. v. Sony Computer Entertainment America, Inc.
- Submitted: March 16, 2005
- Decided: July 25, 2005
- Citation: 426 F.3d 1001

Case history
- Prior history: Scott O. Wright, W.D. Mo. granted summary judgment in favor of Sony Computer Entertainment on all of Frosty Treats's claims.

Court membership
- Judges sitting: Morris S. Arnold, Pasco Bowman II, William J. Riley

Case opinions
- Majority: Arnold, joined by a unanimous court

Keywords
- trademark

Frosty Treats, Inc. v. Sony Computer Entertainment America, Inc., 426 F.3d 1001 (8th Cir. 2005), is a trademark case in which the United States Court of Appeals for the Eighth Circuit held that the name of the largest novelty ice cream truck franchise in the United States was neither distinctive nor famous enough to receive protection against being used in a violent video game.

== Background ==
Frosty Treats, Inc., formerly the Delight Wholesale Company, was the largest novelty ice cream truck franchise in the United States until its closure in 2019. Their trucks uniformly featured a "Frosty Treats" logo and the "Safety Clown", an image of a clown directing children to cross the street behind the truck. In 2001, Sony released Twisted Metal: Small Brawl, an R/C version of a series of video games that allow players to wreak havoc on simulated streets with a variety of vehicles, including an ice cream truck. In Small Brawl, the vehicle has a logo that says, "Frosty Treats". The ice cream truck is always driven by a crazed clown known as Sweet Tooth, one of many featured in the series.

== Lawsuit ==
Frosty Treats, Inc. filed a lawsuit against Sony contending that the game infringed on the company's trademarks through the use of the phrase "Frosty Treats", as well as similarities between Sweet Tooth and the company's own Safety Clown. The U.S. District Court for the Western District of Missouri granted summary judgment to Sony and dismissed the case, holding that the name could not be protected because it was generic. U.S. District Judge Scott Wright stated in his dismissal on May 19, 2005, that "the various depictions of the Sweet Tooth character in defendant's Twisted Metal games and plaintiff's Safety Clown are so dissimilar that no reasonable trier of fact could conclude that they are confusingly similar." Additionally, the court noted that the safety clown could not be protected because it was functional; it directed children to cross behind the van rather than in front of it. Frosty Treats appealed the dismissal to the Eighth Circuit Court of Appeals on June 15, 2005.

== Opinion of the Eighth Circuit Court of Appeals ==
The Eighth Circuit affirmed the dismissal, holding that the name was indeed generic. Judge Morris S. Arnold wrote that, although the Eighth Circuit rejected the finding that the safety clown was functional, they held that it nonetheless lacked distinctiveness in the marketplace such that it would merit protection. Furthermore, the Court noted such striking dissimilarities between the company's clown and the game clown that no consumer would be likely to confuse the two.
