= Nicolas van Beveren =

French actor and film director

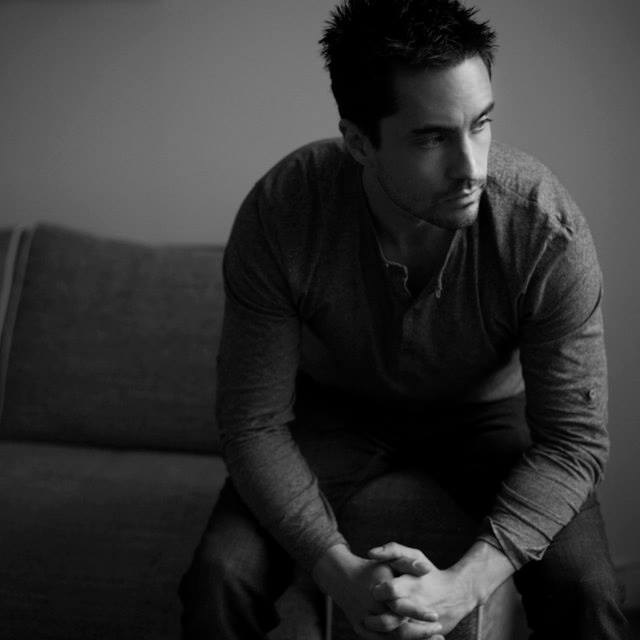
- Nicolas Van Beveren in 2017
- Born: Nicolas Van Beveren; 31 August 1982 (age 43); Machabée, Mahé, Seychelles
- Occupations: film actor; film director
- Years active: 2007–present

Nicolas Van Beveren (born 31 August 1982) is a French actor and film director best known for starring as Jon in the 2016 science fiction film Virtual Revolution.

== Early life and career ==
Van Beveren was born in Summer 1982 to a Seychellois mother and French father in Machabée, a town in Mahé, Seychelles. At the age of 6, he moved to France where he developed interest in acting. He started his career in 2007 after he was called up for an audition in Paris to play a role in a television series on M6, a French TV channel. He has since gone on to feature in various television series and films and has directed four short films over the course of his career. He cites Steven Spielberg, Ridley Scott and Denzel Washington as his influences. Van Beveren appeared in Axe (marque) publicity in 2015.

== Personal life ==
Nicolas Van Beveren went in Notre Dame private school in Poissy, a little city next to Paris between 1987 and 1991. As a teenager, he went in collège Saint-Stanislas in Osny from 1991 to 1996 then he changed for another collège, Léonard de Vinci, located in Saint-Thibault-des-Vignes from 1996 to 1998 in Île-de-France region. He passed his baccalaureate in the Martin Luther King highschool in Bussy-Saint-Georges from 1998 to 2001. He entered between 1998 and 2000 in the Conservatoire national supérieur d'art dramatique of Noisiel.

== Filmography ==
Film
Year	Film	Role	Notes
2026	Missed Call	as Fabien Morvan	TV series
2019	Prise au piège	as Goran, Malika's boyfriend	series
2017	Forbidden	Director	short film
2016	Virtual Revolution	as Jon	—
2016	Je suis toujours belle	Director and writer	—
2015	On Her Neck	as Guillaume	—
2015	Two Lines	Director, producer and writer	short film
2015	Osmosis	as Thomas Melville	TV series (Season 1, Episode 1–10)
2015	Less Is More	as Coach A	TV mini-series
2014	The Colour of the Trap	as Jeremy	—
2014	Sous le soleil de Saint-Tropez	as Sylvain	TV series (10 episodes)
2014	Dreams : 1 rêve, 2 vies	as Raphaël	TV series (Season 1, Episode 1)
2013	Camping Paradis	as Arthur	TV series (Dancing Camping episode)
2012	Mother and Daughter	as Patrick	TV Mini-Series (Mauvaise Orientation episode)
2012	Plus belle la vie	as Kerry	TV series (Season 8, Episode 122)
2012	Les Mystères de l'amour	as Antoine	serie (Season 2)
2011	Zak	as Angel	TV series (Hairman episode)
2009	Chante!	as Mathieu	TV series (5 seasons)
2009	Comprendre & Pardonner	as Lucas	TV series (Révélations episode)
2009	Bob Ghetto	as Denis	TV series
2009	Everybody Dance Club	as Himself	TV series
2008	Memory of Power	as Professor Tom Jefferson	short film
