= The Sentinels (TV series) =

French television series

- French: Les Sentinelles
- No. of series: 1
- No. of episodes: 8

Production
- Production company: StudioCanal

Original release
- Network: Canal+

The Sentinels (French: Les Sentinelles) is a French television series, starring Louis Peres as Gabriel Ferraud. It was broadcast for the first time on France's Canal+ channel in 2025, and subsequently by the BBC in July 2026.

== Cast ==
- Louis Peres as Gabriel Ferraud
- Thibaut Évrard as Émile Bazac allias Djibouti
- Kacey Mottet-Klein as De Clermont
- Carl Malapa as Armand
- Olivia Ross as Irène Ferraud
- Ouassini Embarek as Le Baron
- Pauline Étienne as Marthe
- Nastya Golubeva as Gisèle
- Noam Morgensztern as Mirreau
- Nadir Legrand as Mazauric
- Aurore Broutin as Roxane
- Jean-Michel Rucheton as Salomon
- Gabriel Almaer as Bonnefond
- Jonas Bachan as Maximilian Neuer
- Jochen Hägele as Gruber

== Plot ==
As the First World War begins, French soldier Gabriel Ferraud is seriously wounded. Inoculated with a serum that grants extraordinary abilities, he has been chosen to be part of an ultra-secret army experiment to create super soldiers. Now stronger, faster, and more resilient, he joins The Sentinels, an elite unit made up of soldiers who have been similarly gifted with extraordinary abilities.

In parallel with this, he is also the victim of uncontrollable outbursts of violence. It seems he has a telepathic link with another super soldier, but this one is on the enemy side. Gabriel has to face this horrifying new reality that will decide the fate of the war.
