= Resistance (TV series) =

French television period drama miniseries

Resistance is a French television period drama series in six 52-minute episodes, first broadcast (as Résistance) on TF1 in France in May 2014 and on More4 in the UK in August 2015. It was broadcast and streamed on PBS in the US from January 2020. The mini-series is directed by Miguel Courtois, David Delrieux and Alain Goldman.

== Synopsis ==
The drama is set in German-occupied Paris in 1940 and depicts the lives of students and teachers within the French Resistance in World War II and is loosely based on the activities of the Groupe du musée de l'Homme.

The series, written by Dan Franck, was commissioned to coincide with the 70th anniversary of the liberation of Paris.

The Guardian noted that the series has a "great sense of the sludge and the trudge, and depression and rain, the heartache, and the general constant filthy low-level stress of a long sneaking war in which the most precious – the only – currency was trust, given as grudgingly as you would proffer your soul."

== Cast ==
- Pauline Burlet as Lili Franchet
- Tom Hudson as Jeannot
- Jérémie Petrus as Andre Kirschen
- Robert Plagnol as Boris Vildé
- Pascale Arbillot as Victoria
- Stéphane Debac as Albert Mulveau
- Nicolas Koretzky as Morlot
- Valérie Karsenti as Maryka
- Isabelle Nanty as Paulette
- César Domboy as The Kid
- Richard Berry as Lili's father
- Fanny Ardant as The Countess
- Jochen Hägele as Doering
- Alexis Michalik as Vélin
