= Twisted Metal: Small Brawl =

2001 video game

- Developer: Incog Inc. Entertainment
- Publisher: Sony Computer Entertainment
- Director: Steve Ceragioli
- Producers: Mike Batholomew; Linda Jo
- Designer: Dave Goodrich
- Programmers: Mike Bartholomew; Konrad Behrens; J. Scott Edwards; Karl Graham; Nathan Martinez; David Robinson; Jess Walker
- Artist: Dave Goodrich
- Writers: Steve Ceragioli; Mike Giam; Dave Goodrich; Benjamin Harrison
- Composers: Mike Reagan; Gregory J. Hainer
- Series: Twisted Metal
- Platform: PlayStation
- Release: NA: November 27, 2001
- Genre: Vehicular combat
- Modes: Single-player, multiplayer

Twisted Metal: Small Brawl is a 2001 vehicular combat video game developed by Incog Inc. Entertainment and published by Sony Computer Entertainment for the PlayStation. It is an entry in the Twisted Metal series that reimagines the concept by scaling down its deathmatches to a miniature setting. In the game, players pilot armed remote-controlled cars and destroy opponents until one remains.

The game was developed alongside Twisted Metal: Black as an accessible entry aimed at introducing a younger audience to the series. It received mixed reviews upon release, with critics praising the novelty and interactivity of the level design and criticizing the loose controls and dated graphics.

== Gameplay ==
The gameplay of Twisted Metal: Small Brawl takes place within miniature-scale environments, such as this tree house.

Twisted Metal: Small Brawl is a vehicular combat game centered on arena-style deathmatches in which players control miniature remote-controlled cars equipped with weapons. The premise depicts familiar characters from earlier Twisted Metal entries as children, while the titular tournament's host Calypso is portrayed as a schoolyard bully. The contestants are coerced by Calypso into participating in battles across household and playground settings, with the victor being granted a wish. The core gameplay loop involves maneuvering toy vehicles through confined environments while engaging multiple opponents in destructive battles, with the objective of eliminating rivals until only one vehicle remains. Combat incorporates machine guns standard for all vehicles alongside special weapons unique to each vehicle, power-ups scattered throughout levels, and environmental hazards that can be used to gain tactical advantages. Each vehicle can perform "battery attacks", which provide temporary abilities such as shields, freezing effects, or deploying mines. Eleven vehicles are playable by default, with five others being unlockable.

The game's single-player "Tournament" campaign consists of eight sequential levels. Players advance by defeating a set number of enemy vehicles per stage, with the difficulty increasing through additional opponents, more hazardous arena layouts, and tougher encounters; the fourth and eighth levels feature boss battles equipped with shields and enhanced weaponry. The Tournament campaign concludes with an ending sequence pertaining to the selected character. The "Challenge" mode allow players to select specific vehicles and face chosen opponents, while the "Endurance" mode tasks players with surviving as long as possible against waves of enemies. The multiplayer modes support two players in three primary formats: "Head to Head" duels that pit opponents directly against each other, a "Cooperative" mode in which players jointly progress through campaign levels while assisting one another, and "Free for All" sessions that combine both human players with AI-controlled vehicles in a last-vehicle-standing fight.

== Development and release ==
Twisted Metal: Small Brawl was developed by Incog Inc. Entertainment under the direction of Sony Computer Entertainment's Steve Ceragioli, with Incog's Mike Bartholomew and Sony's Linda Jo serving as producers. The game was developed alongside Twisted Metal: Black to attract a new generation of gamers, a mission statement aligning with the newly launched PS one. Dave Goodrich was the game's lead designer and art director. Bartholomew was a programmer on the game alongside Konrad Behrens, J. Scott Edwards, Karl Graham, Nathan Martinez, David Robinson, and Jess Walker. Mike Giam and Jon Steele were the game's respective creative and technical directors. The physics engine is based on that of Twisted Metal 2. The in-game music was created by Mike Reagan and Gregory J. Hainer of Scorpio Sound, and sound design was provided by Tommy Tallarico Studios. The intro and end movies were produced by Argonaut CG Films, and were written by Ceragioli, Giam, Goodrich, and Benjamin Harrison.

The game was announced under the title Twisted Metal Kids at a press event for Twisted Metal: Black in Santa Monica, California on March 2, 2001. The final title was revealed at the Electronic Entertainment Expo on May 16, and the game was released on November 27.

== Reception ==
Reception

Aggregate score
Aggregator	Score
Metacritic	51/100

Review scores
Publication	Score
Electronic Gaming Monthly	2.5/10, 4.5/10, 3.5/10
Game Informer	3/10
GamePro	2.5/5
GameSpot	6.5/10
GameZone	5.5/10
IGN	4.5/10
Official U.S. PlayStation Magazine	2.5/5

Twisted Metal: Small Brawl received "mixed or average reviews" according to the review aggregator Metacritic. Critics largely positioned the game as a niche entry unlikely to satisfy longtime fans of the franchise, frequently comparing it unfavorably to Twisted Metal 2 or Black and recommended renting the game rather than purchasing. Sam Kennedy of Official U.S. PlayStation Magazine described the game's lighter tone, reduced intensity, and technical limitations as a step in the wrong direction. Dan Amrich of GamePro regarded it as a disappointing "swan song" for the series on the original PlayStation, but recognized its potential appeal to younger players or series completists. Andy McNamara of Game Informer denounced the game as fundamentally flawed and remarked that it "doesn't even live up to the first four PSX titles in the series".

Reactions to the gameplay were lukewarm, with several reviewers observing that the controls often feel looser, floatier, or less precise than in prior installments. Trevor Rivers of GameSpot warned that even experienced players would initially find maneuvering difficult, though added that the learning curve would not irreparably harm enjoyment. Mark Fujita of IGN pointed out the limited configuration options, which were restricted to three preset schemes with minimal functional differences, and alterations to special "battery attacks" that may disrupt muscle memory from earlier games. Kraig Kujawa of Electronic Gaming Monthly (EGM) and Dan Amrich criticized the slow-paced action for lacking a sense of speed, with Kujawa adding that the simplistic enemy artificial intelligence reduced intensity, as opponents frequently failed to take cover or pursue aggressively.

Reviewers frequently praised the miniature-scale environments as creatively tailored to the remote-control car concept. The levels, such as a fully interactive kitchen and a mini-golf course, were appreciated for their novel interactive elements and visual variety. The Badger of GameZone emphasized these settings as a highlight that sustained interest by delivering unexpected themes. Rivers regarded the level design as quirky, which he said aligned with the lighthearted music. However, some critics found the arenas too small, claustrophobic, or lacking hidden areas and explorable secrets present in previous games like Twisted Metal 2, limiting replay value and strategic depth.

The graphics were consistently criticized. The Badger described the visuals as grainy, primitive, pixelated, and regressive, even relative to previous PlayStation installments, with objects fading in and out, unclear landmarks, and chaotic attack effects that obscured the action. Fujita derided the human character models as "creepy", supposing that their appearances alone increased the game's age rating. He and Kujawa singled out the menus as particularly basic and uninspired, with Kujawa comparing them to Commodore 64 aesthetics. Rivers acknowledged the shortcomings while suggesting the title targeted players unconcerned with high-end visuals on aging PlayStation hardware. The Badger and Fujita expressed disappointment that the same development team behind stronger entries produced such an "unfinished" or "slapped together" appearance.

The audio received mixed assessments: the music earned approval for maintaining the series' energy and fitting the quirky levels, whereas Shane Bettenhausen of EGM dismissed it as "hair-band music". The sound effects for collisions, tires, and general feedback struck Rivers as weak or incoherent, diminishing immersion during the frantic play.
