= Virtual Revolution =

- Directed by: Guy-Roger Duvert
- Written by: Guy-Roger Duvert
- Starring: Mike Dopud; Jochen Hägele; Maximilien Poullein; Kaya Blocksage; Jane Badler
- Production company: Lidderdalei Productions
- Release date: June 4, 2016 (Dances with Films Festival)
- Running time: 92 minutes
- Country: United States

Virtual Revolution (also known as 2047: Virtual Revolution) is a 2016 independent cyberpunk film directed and written by Guy-Roger Duvert in his directorial debut, and starring Mike Dopud, Jane Badler, Jochen Hägele and Maximilien Poullein. The film is set in a dystopian Neo Paris in which people have embraced virtual reality completely.

== Plot ==
In 2047, more than 75% of the population, known as the Connected, spend the majority of their lives living in online virtual games (called verses). The world is dominated by a few corporations, and politicians are happy to keep the masses docile through online games. After 148 gamers are killed in a computer virus attack perpetrated by terrorist group Necromancers, Synternis Corporation operative Dina hires shadow agent Nash to track and eliminate the attackers. Nash spends half his time online and is haunted by the death of his love Helena in a virus attack a few years back. Nash recruits a hacker, Morel, Helena's brother, to hack security video from Interpol servers. Synternis covers up the attack to avoid any involvement of Interpol. Nash infiltrates a Necromancer cell by taking over the online avatar of one of their members. There he learns that the goal of Necromancers is to break people out of virtual reality by any means. Morel's hacking attempts draw the attention of Interpol, which leads to Interpol intimidating him. Nash is ambushed at his flat by Camylle, leader of the Necromancers. She tells him that Synternis Corporation is responsible for the death of Helena, as they first developed the virus capable of killing players while online. Camylle asks Nash to help in her plan to free everyone by injecting the virus into a server at Synternis headquarters. This virus will systematically shut down all the verses, forcing people to confront the real world. Nash contemplates whether it is wise to force the unwilling populace into freedom. Before they can shut down the servers, a furious mob lynches the necromancers. Dina severs all the ties between Synternis and Nash. She also claims that he was misled; the virus that killed Helena was launched by the Necromancers, and Helena was a Synternis mole working inside the Necromancers. He does not know which version to believe. To escape his painful memories, Nash becomes one of the Connected and uses his fortune to add features and comforts to his online avatar. He reasons that since his brain can not distinguish between real and virtual, the online life is as good as real.

== Cast ==
- Mike Dopud as Nash
- Jane Badler as Dina
- Jochen Hägele as Stilson
- Maximilien Poullein as Morel
- Kaya Blocksage as Camylle
- Petra Silander as Kate
- Nicolas van Beveren as Jon
- Elie Haddad as Camille

== Reception ==
Rotten Tomatoes, a review aggregator, reports that 40% of five surveyed critics gave the film a positive review; the average rating is 6/10. Justin Lowe of The Hollywood Reporter criticized what he felt was a "consistently derivative plotline". Lowe said Duvert put too much emphasis on visuals at the expense of a memorable characters or concepts. Robert Abele of the Los Angeles Times called it "ambitious but leaden", criticizing the acting and plot.
