= Twisted Metal: Head-On =

2005 video game

- European PlayStation Portable cover art
- Developers: Incognito Entertainment (Note: Santa Monica Studio assisted on development.) (PSP); Eat Sleep Play (PS2)
- Publisher: Sony Computer Entertainment
- Directors: Scott Campbell; David Jaffe (Twisted Metal: Lost)
- Producer: Scott Campbell
- Designers: Scott Campbell; David Jaffe (Twisted Metal: Lost)
- Writers: Scott Campbell; David Jaffe (Twisted Metal: Lost)
- Composer: Inon Zur
- Series: Twisted Metal
- Platforms: PlayStation Portable, PlayStation 2
- Release: PlayStation Portable: NA: March 24, 2005; EU: November 4, 2005; PlayStation 2: NA: February 5, 2008
- Genre: Vehicular combat
- Modes: Single-player, Multiplayer

Twisted Metal: Head-On is a 2005 vehicular combat video game developed by Incognito Entertainment and published by Sony Computer Entertainment for the PlayStation Portable. A port developed by Eat Sleep Play for the PlayStation 2 was released in 2008. Head-On is the seventh installment of the Twisted Metal series, and the first game in the series to ship fully online-enabled.

== Premise ==
Head-On is a direct sequel to Twisted Metal 2, while ignoring the events of Twisted Metal III and Twisted Metal 4 and other installments. Akin to other games in the series, Head-On revolves around the same theme of a man named Calypso holding a vehicular combat tournament called "Twisted Metal", with the promise of granting the winner whatever they ask for.

== Minigames ==
Head-On also includes minigames that players can access via teleporters, which can be found in each level during Story Mode. These are bonus levels where players must collect power ups while circumventing obstacles that require a variety of tactics, including destroying taxicabs, jumping over chasms, and destroying helicopters using napalm bombs. The catch is that most of these minigames are timed, forcing the player to think on their feet, as it were, while maintaining a balance of caution and risk. Reaching the end of the mini-game prior to the timer's ending allows the player to all their powerups. Several characters can only be unlocked by completing the minigames on certain levels.

== Twisted Metal Head-On: Extra Twisted Edition ==
A PlayStation 2 port of Twisted Metal: Head-On was released on February 5, 2008. The game was developed by Jaffe's newly formed studio Eat Sleep Play and was retitled Twisted Metal Head-On: Extra Twisted Edition. It was never released outside of North America and is thus only available in NTSC format.

The PS2 port contains extra features and bonuses, such as the unreleased live action end movies from Twisted Metal, a behind the scenes documentary, a cut-down version of the canceled sequel to Twisted Metal: Black named Twisted Metal: Lost, and a concept art book. Each physical copy also comes with a code to download a Twisted Metal soundtrack. The documentary includes an answer to a question Twisted Metal fans have been asking for a long time. After fans deciphered a message in the Dark Past documentary as reading "Twisted Metal is coming on psthree", Jaffe confirmed it himself. It also lacks the online play feature of the original PSP version.

== Reception ==
Reception

Aggregate scores
Aggregator	Score
GameRankings	(PSP) 78.84% (PS2) 73.16%
Metacritic	(PSP) 79/100 (PS2) 73/100

Review scores
Publication	Score
Edge	6/10
Electronic Gaming Monthly	6.67/10
Eurogamer	(PS2) 6/10 (PSP) 5/10
Game Informer	(PSP) 8.75/10 (PS2) 7.25/10
GamePro	4/5
GameRevolution	(PSP) B (PS2) D+
GameSpot	(PSP) 8.5/10 (PS2) 7.5/10
GameSpy	(PSP) 4/5 (PS2) 3/5
GameTrailers	7.5/10
GameZone	(PSP) 9/10 (PS2) 8/10
IGN	(PS2) 8.4/10 (PSP) 8/10
Official U.S. PlayStation Magazine	4/5
The A.V. Club	C+
Detroit Free Press	3/4

The game was met with average to positive reviews upon release. GameRankings and Metacritic gave it a score of 78.84% and 79 out of 100 for the PSP version, and 73.16% and 73 out of 100 for the PlayStation 2 version.
