= Incognito Entertainment =

Defunct American video game developer

- Final logo used from 2001 to 2009
- Type: Subsidiary
- Industry: Video games
- Founded: 1999; 27 years ago
- Founder: Scott Campbell
- Defunct: 2009
- Fate: Dissolved
- Successor: Eat Sleep Play; LightBox Interactive
- Headquarters: Salt Lake City, US
- Key people: Scott Campbell; David Jaffe
- Products: Twisted Metal series
- Number of employees: 51 (2002)
- Parent: Sony Computer Entertainment (2002–2005); SCE Worldwide Studios (2005–2009)

Incognito Entertainment (formerly Incognito Studios and Incog Inc. Entertainment) was an American video game developer headquartered in Salt Lake City. It was acquired by Sony Computer Entertainment in 2002, making it a first-party developer until its dissolution in 2009.

== History ==
Incognito Entertainment was founded in 1999 by Scott Campbell, who had previously led the development of Rogue Trip: Vacation 2012 for SingleTrac. In January 2000, the company signed a publishing agreement with a "major North American publisher". The studio was originally known as Incognito Studios and later renamed Incog Inc. Entertainment. Sony acquired Incog Inc. Entertainment in August 2002 and made it an internal studio of Sony Computer Entertainment America (SCEA). At the time, the studio employed 51 people.

Campbell and David Jaffe, alongside the majority of the company's staff, left Incognito Entertainment in July 2007 to form Eat Sleep Play, an independent studio backed by SCEA. The remainder of Incognito Entertainment was led by Dylan Jobe and maintained the PlayStation 3 game Warhawk. In March 2009, he and several other staff members left the studio to establish LightBox Interactive.

== Games developed ==
Year	Title	Platform(s)
2001	Twisted Metal: Black	PlayStation 2
2001	Twisted Metal: Small Brawl	PlayStation
2002	Twisted Metal: Black Online	PlayStation 2
2003	War of the Monsters	PlayStation 2
2003	Downhill Domination	PlayStation 2
2005	Twisted Metal: Head-On	PlayStation Portable
2007	Calling All Cars!	PlayStation 3
2007	Warhawk	PlayStation 3
