= 96 Hours =

2014 film directed by Frédéric Schoendoerffer

96 hours
- Film poster
- Directed by: Frédéric Schoendoerffer
- Written by: Simon Michaël; Philippe Isard; Yann Brion
- Produced by: Laurent Pétin; Michèle Pétin
- Starring: Niels Arestrup; Gérard Lanvin
- Cinematography: Vincent Gallot
- Edited by: Sophie Fourdrinoy
- Music by: Max Richter
- Production company: ARP Sélection
- Distributed by: ARP Sélection
- Release date: 23 April 2014
- Running time: 96 minutes
- Country: France
- Language: French
- Budget: $9.2 million
- Box office: $1.2 million

96 hours (original title: 96 heures) is a 2014 French thriller film directed by Frédéric Schoendoerffer.

== Plot ==
After 3 years in prison, Kancel is being transferred for questioning. In transit, he escapes, abducting Captain Carré of the BRB, responsible for putting him behind bars. Kancel has 96 hours to find out who betrayed him and get his revenge.

== Cast ==
- Niels Arestrup as Victor Kancel
- Gérard Lanvin as Gabriel Carré
- Sylvie Testud as Marion Reynaud
- Anne Consigny as Françoise Carré
- Laura Smet as Camille Kancel
- Slimane Dazi as Abdel Koudri
- Cyril Lecomte as Lawyer Francis Castella
- Jochen Hägele as Sacha
- Pierre Kiwitt as Joseph
- Jules Balekdjian as Tom
- Maurice Bitsch as Hamon
