= Jochen Hägele =

German film and television actor (born 1974)

Jochen Hägele (born 1975) is a German film and television actor. Specializes also in French dubbing, he is the voice-over artist of Daniel Brühl.

== Early life ==
Jochen Hägele is born in 1975 in Stuttgart, Germany. In 1976, his family moved in France, he learned also the French language. He trained in drama from 1993 to 1996 at the Cours Florent in Paris.

He moved to Paris in 1995.

== Career ==
He has appeared in over 40 television and feature films. He acts in German, French and English. He plays the role of Stilson in Virtual Revolution, a science fiction film directed and written by Guy-Roger Duvert, which won several awards including best picture at the Los Angeles Independent Film Festival. He features with actress Fanny Ardent in the television period drama series Resistance.

== Filmography ==
=== Film ===
- Le Village des ombres (2010) – Klaus Froelich
- Eyjafjallajökull (2013) – Agent Avis Allemagne
- Chinese Puzzle (2013) – German philosopher Hegel
- 96 hours (2014) – Sacha
- Picnic in Gaza (2014) – Voice
- House of Time (2015) – Hans Kammler
- Virtual Revolution (2016) – Stilson
- L'ascension (2017) – Emmerich
- Nos patriotes (2017) – Lieutenant Muller
- The Sisters Brothers (2018) – Horse Dealer Town No. 3
- Mes jours de gloire (2020) – Gerd
- Hard Skills (2021) – Paul Olivier (Post-production)
- Qu'est-ce qu'on a tous fait au Bon Dieu (2021) – Helmut

=== Television ===
- Un village français (2009–2014) – Ludwig (18 episodes)
- Transporter: The Series (2012) – Jurgen
- Resistance (2014) – Doering
- A Very Secret Service (2015) – Captain Otto Schmidt
- Ein Fall für zwei (2017) – Peter Arnold
- Mordshunger – Verbrechen und andere Delikatessen (2019) – Werner Immenbach
- Un si grand soleil (2019) – Jerome Lorin (40 episodes)
- Weil du mir gehörst (2019, TVfilm) – Martin Wolters
- Ma mère, le véto (2019) – Pierre DuBois (2 episodes)
- Baron Noir (2020) – Klaus Fischtel (4 episodes)
- Rauhantekijä (2020) – Saksan ulkoministeri (3 episodes)
- Tell Me Who I Am (2020–2021) – Kleist (9 episodes)
- The Sentinels (2025) – Gruber (3 episodes)

== Roles ==
=== Live action ===
- Daniel Brühl (French version)
  - Rush (2013) – Niki Lauda
  - Woman in Gold (2015) – Hubertus Czernin
  - Burnt (2015) – Tony
  - Colonia (2015) – Daniel
  - The Zookeeper's Wife (2017) – Lutz Heck
  - The Alienist (2018) – Dr Laszlo Kreizler
  - Entebbe (2018) – Wilfried Böse
  - All Quiet on the Western Front (2022) – Matthias Erzberger
  - Race for Glory: Audi vs. Lancia (2024) - Roland Gumpert
- 1899 (2022) – Eyk Larsen (Andreas Pietschmann)

=== Animation ===
- Bleach (French version) (2004–2012) : Tōshirō Hitsugaya, Yumichika Ayasegawa, Kaname Tōsen, Zangetsu (Ichigo's Zanpakutō Spirit)
- Bleach: Thousand-Year Blood War (French version) (2023–present) : Tōshirō Hitsugaya, Yumichika Ayasegawa, Zangetsu, Kaname Tōsen
