= Warhawk (2007 video game) =

2007 video game

- North American PlayStation 3 cover art
- Developer: Incognito Entertainment (Note: Santa Monica Studio assisted on development.)
- Publisher: Sony Computer Entertainment
- Director: Dylan Jobe
- Designers: Dylan Jobe; Ryan Mudd
- Composers: Christopher Lennertz; Timothy Michael Wynn
- Platform: PlayStation 3
- Release: NA: August 28, 2007; EU: August 30, 2007; AU: August 31, 2007; JP: October 4, 2007
- Genre: Third-person shooter
- Mode: Multiplayer

Warhawk was a 2007 online multiplayer third-person shooter video game developed by Incognito Entertainment and published by Sony Computer Entertainment for the PlayStation 3. It was intended to be a remake of an aerial warfare game of the same name, which was an early title on the original PlayStation. It was the first PlayStation 3 game to be available both physically and digitally on the PlayStation Network.

Warhawk was initially intended to have both single-player and multiplayer modes, however the single-player element was canceled during development due to concerns that it was inferior to the game's multiplayer component. The game was released with five maps (each with five possible configurations) and four game types, Deathmatch, Team Deathmatch, Zones and Capture the Flag. After the 1.4 update, the number of game types increased to six with the addition of the Hero and Collection modes. Three optional expansion packs for the game containing new maps and equipment increase the number of available maps to eight.

Warhawk was met with a generally positive reception by reviewers. However, for a few months after its initial launch it was plagued by connection and server issues, including ranking issues with players, which were subsequently corrected in updates. The player is able to rank-up though 20 ranks ranging from Recruit to General, unlocking new personnel and aircraft customization options at each rank. A spiritual successor, Starhawk, was released in May 2012.

Sony shut down Warhawk's online servers on January 31, 2019, at 8 am GMT, providing notice by email to PlayStation Network members. Since the shutdown, numerous players in the game's community have utilized third-party tools and services such as XLink Kai and PlayStation Online Network Emulated to continue playing.

== Gameplay ==
Multiplayer mode showing a Eucadian tank targeting a Chernovan soldier via split screen

Warhawk is a third-person shooter set in a science fictional, perpetual war between the Eucadian Republic and Chernovan Empire (blue and red team, respectively).

There are two ground vehicles, a jeep and a tank, and an armored personnel carrier is added by the Operation: Broken Mirror expansion. There are two air vehicles, the Warhawk and Nemesis (which are only cosmetically different), both of which can use nine weapons, an example is the AS-3 Tow Missile system. That weapon is the only weapon in the game where the player guides the weapon, the players screen is devoted to guiding the missile and leaving the player open to getting hit. But the upside is that it does massive damage and is the largest explosion in the game. The Omega Dawn expansion adds a dropship, and the Fallen Star expansion adds a jetpack. There are three turrets available to the player (anti-air missile turret, anti-air flak turret, and the .50 caliber anti-infantry machine gun). The game uses the PlayStation 3 Sixaxis and DualShock 3 controllers. The game can be set to make use of these controllers' motion sensing function to allow the players to control aircraft and ground vehicles by tilting the controller in different directions rather than the more conventional methods of using the D-pad or analog sticks. However, a traditional control scheme is the default option. Warhawk offers online and offline multiplayer play. Offline allows for 1-4 players splitscreen (without bots). Online features up to 32-player battles, with the ability to have up to 4 players use one PlayStation 3 in split screen mode (on non-ranked servers that permit it). Players 2-4 can enter or exit the game while a match is in progress.

The game uses medals and rewards, which are awarded for certain tasks. As of v1.50, the game supports trophies, which will be used in the online service PlayStation Home. Players are also able to customize their characters with armor squad markings, Warhawk paint schemes, and other accessories. More customization options are unlocked as the player increases in rank. Warhawk also allows the creation of clans, which may participate in online events and competitions. The game also makes use of arbiters, paid anonymous players who are tasked to find cheaters within the game. They are able to punish offending players in several ways, such as an email warning, a forum post, a kick, or a temporary/permanent ban. Arbiters can also request that the player's stats be erased.

=== PlayStation Home ===
Warhawk is one of many games that supports game launching in PlayStation Home. This feature allows players to host a game in Home and then launch it once other players have joined. The player may even invite friends to the game launch. Once the game has been launched from Home the players may return to Home at any time via the "Return to PlayStation Home" option that appears instead of the "Quit Game" option. On February 26, 2009, Incognito Entertainment and Santa Monica Studio launched the Warhawk space for PlayStation Home. Beyond its unique aesthetics, the space is functionally similar to those for Uncharted: Drake's Fortune and Far Cry 2, with one notable exception: the "Warhawk Sand Table". It's a place to plan in-game strategies using "VR" set-pieces—vehicles, maneuver icons, etc. - which can be moved around on 2D versions of any of the game's maps (and their variants).

The first person to access the table is in control. Here's where one of the problems arises: anyone can walk up and watch as a user plans their "secret" strategy. Furthermore, there's no way to share or use the finished battle plan within the game. It's all up to each player's memory (or notepad).

There is also a "Learning Terminal" (eight in all) that tells the users about General Hints, Weapons, and Flying.

Outso developed the Warhawk game space for Incognito Entertainment and Santa Monica Studio as well as the "Warhawk Sand Table" in the space.

On February 11, 2010, a Warhawk personal space was released in Home. It includes the Sand Table featured in the Game Space as well as a multiplayer turret mini-game.

As of July 2010, the Warhawk game space has been removed from PlayStation Home, due to lack of players actually using the space.

=== Game modes ===
Warhawk supports six separate game modes compatible with all variations of all of the maps.

- Deathmatch. Every man for himself. The game ends when a player reaches the score limit, or when time expires.
- Team Deathmatch. Same rules as a deathmatch except the player is automatically assigned to either the Chernovan (red) or Eucadian (blue) teams. Game ends when the combined score limit is met or when time expires.

- Dogfight. A variation on Deathmatch/Team Deathmatch where you play only in the Warhawk/Nemesis planes.

- Hero. A version of the team deathmatch where a hero is randomly selected on both sides for one minute, or until the hero dies. The hero gets a health boost, damage boost, and every weapon in the game (which the hero can keep if he survives the one minute). The key difference between Hero and TDM is that in TDM all enemy kills are counted to the team total whereas in Hero, only when killing the Hero or when the Hero kills an enemy are they counted towards the total.
- Capture the Flag. This mode of game play is by far the most popular among Warhawk players. In this mode each team has a flag at their base which they must defend while attempting to capture the second flag in their opponent's base. You can only capture the flag if your flag remains at the base.
- Collection. This mode features four "cores" scattered along the map. The object is to collect as many cores as possible. Once a core has been collected, a new one will respawn in the same spot as where the player got it. If a player dies, all cores are lost, and an enemy, or nearby teammate can collect them.
- Zones. The object of this mode is to capture various control points on the map. Each control point has three levels for each team, and a neutral level. A player can do this in other game modes (except deathmatch) to earn points for yourself, but in Zones, their team gains points for the number of zones the player has, and how many levels each one has. The player will only be able to capture levels if the area around it is clear, or captured by their team. The game ends when the time runs out, score limit is reached, or if the player is able to capture all control points.

== Development ==
Warhawk was first announced to the public in May 2005, with a working build shown at E3 in 2006. This version was the first PlayStation 3 title to be shown with the newly announced Sixaxis motion sensing technology. In February 2007, it was announced that the single player element of the game was to be pulled. This was due to concerns Incognito had over the quality of the single-player campaign, particularly when compared to the multi-player modes. Dylan Jobe, the game's director, stated, "If we were to continue down our single-player/multiplayer approach, it would have resulted in not as good single player or not as good multiplayer". The extra development of the multiplayer mode was used to improve existing elements such as in-game communication, and to implement new features such as On Demand Split Screen, whereby players can easily enter split screen mid-game. Split screen can only be used in battles that allow it. Only unranked servers have the ability to have it and even then, it is an option whether or not the host wants it on or off. It was also revealed at the same time that Warhawk would be made available for download over the PlayStation Network.

In August 2007, Sony Computer Entertainment America released news that PlayStation 3 consoles would be used as the dedicated servers for Warhawk. A photograph was released which showed a server room with several PlayStation 3 consoles in racks. Each server is able to support 32 players. The games developers have commented that the engine used in the game features technology which could not be easily implemented on any other platform, such as procedurally generated water and waves, as well as volumetric clouds.

Following the games release, many issues with networking and player statistics were reported, such as delays in receiving points and awards, failure to receive the points or awards, and "connection failed" and "connection lost" errors. To address these issues, Incognito released several server-side patches before releasing the game's first update, Version 1.1. This update addressed the majority of issues users experienced with the game, with others being addressed in the Version 1.2 update. A demo was released on the PlayStation Store on October 9, 2008.

=== Release ===
There was initial confusion as to how this game would be distributed to consumers, after the announcement that it would be a multiplayer-only title. Sony announced on May 16, 2007, that there would be two iterations of the game. The game alone is downloadable from the PlayStation Store for US$29.99 (£19.99, €29.99), with an initial download size of 798MB. This version is restricted to the PlayStation Network account that buys it. The second is a retail Blu-ray Disc version that sells for $59.99 (the standard retail price of most PlayStation 3 games upon release), bundled with a Jabra BT125 Bluetooth headset in America and the Jabra BT135 in Europe, allowing players to chat with other players online while playing the game. An additional third was later released on October 10, 2007, without the inclusion of a USB headset, which was priced at US$39.99. Both retail versions feature extra content such as behind-the-scenes developer interviews, concept art and trailers. Warhawk was re-released as a Greatest Hits title on July 28, 2008, for $29.99.

=== Updates and expansions ===
The armored personnel carrier in the Vaporfield Glacier map

Additional downloadable content (DLC) has been released, with more announced, since the game's launch. Expansions include new maps, weapon upgrades and character customization options. The DualShock 3 controller became compatible with the game upon the release of the version 1.20 patch. Incognito has stated that any future development on the incomplete single player campaign would only be released as a separate product, and not as an expansion to the current game. Warhawk updates are free, but expansion packs are sold online for a price. Updates are mandatory installations that must be completed in order to play the game. Expansion packs are optional, and the ability to purchase expansion packs is available within the menu of the game itself, as well as through the PlayStation Store.

The 1.1 and 1.2 updates were released on October 19, 2007, and December 19, 2007, respectively, fixing numerous exploits and stability issues. Update 1.3 was released on April 2, 2008, and included two new weapons, eighteen new player-made customizations for planes and forty-four new player-made custom insignias for both troops and planes, integration of PlayStation Home, and new in-game chat features, such as cross-team chat. Also in update 1.3, the "stat padding" issue, a bug that allowed game players to cheat by increasing their points cumulatively by dropping the opponents' flag off the level and having it respawn back into the players' hands to repeat, was resolved by completely removing the ability to drop the flag. Update 1.4, released on July 16, 2008, features two new game modes called "Hero" and "Collection," and introduced the Quick Join feature, which searches for a server that connects the user to matches that work with the user's current level. The next update, Version 1.5, was released on August 27, 2008, and includes trophy support, the winning entries from the European version of the paint and insignia contest, and allows the user to play music via the XrossMediaBar in-game.

Three expansion packs have been released. The first, "Operation: Omega Dawn," released on December 20, 2007, includes a new night-themed map, Omega Factory, and a new aircraft, the KT-424 Combat Dropship. The second expansion pack was released on April 17, 2008, entitled "Operation: Broken Mirror", which includes a new armoured personnel carrier equipped with an energy shield and the ability to boost, similar to a Warhawk, as well as serving as a mobile spawn point. A new map called Vaporfield Glacier was also included in the new expansion. It is the largest map to date, and includes 10 different layouts. In the PlayStation Store, there is also an option to purchase the first two Booster-packs for a reduced price, and there will be another combo pack with all three included. The latest booster pack, "Operation Fallen Star," was released on August 28, 2008, and added the Icarus MK1 Jetpack which allows troops to fire while airborne as well as a new map called Tau Crater. All three of the booster packs cannot be combined, nor can one affiliate with another, and people who do not own an expansion featured in a server they are attempting to join will not be able to join the server.

On August 27, 2008, the 1.5 patch was released and included the addition of trophy support. A total of 57 trophies are available in the game, 10 of which are retroactive and can be obtained based on previously recorded statistics without the user having to complete tasks a second time. A further 34 are based upon gameplay and so are not retroactive. The trophies can be attained Split-screen or Unranked as well. Each of the available expansions also feature an additional 4 trophies.

On May 13, 2011, game developer Dylan Jobe unveiled the successor to the game entitled Starhawk on GTTV. Starhawk was released on May 8, 2012.

== Music ==
The music is composed by both Christopher Lennertz and Timothy Michael Wynn. Their scores for this video game were recognized as one of the best video game scores of 2007 by IGN.

== Reception ==
Reception

Aggregate scores
Aggregator	Score
GameRankings	84/100
Metacritic	84/100

Review scores
Publication	Score
Edge	8/10
Game Informer	8.25
GamePro	4/5
GameRevolution	B
GameSpot	8.5/10
IGN	8.8/10
PlayStation Official Magazine – UK	9/10
PlayStation: The Official Magazine	6.5/10

Warhawk generally received positive reviews, with its aggregate review scores being classed as generally favorable by Metacritic and GameRankings. PSM provided the lowest review score officially qualified by the GameRankings website. The magazine described it as "a third-person shooter that never quite gets off the ground." Other reviews were more positive in their outlook. PSM3 described the game as "a masterpiece of balance, of design, and the jewel in Sony's online crown." UK magazine Edge described it as an "instantly gratifying experience", also saying that the lack of a single-player campaign was made up for by "its brilliantly implemented notion of flight and considered balance". Nick Costanza and Vin Acosta were largely critical of the game, saying "it can't be taken seriously".

1UP.com gave Warhawk a positive review, but said, "It's just not quite $40 worth," referring to the price of the downloadable version on the U.S. PlayStation Store. It was given the IGN Editors' Choice Award, calling it "a AAA experience that is an adrenaline rush for online fans." Game Informer described Warhawk as "better than they'd hoped for". GamePro stated that although Warhawk offers an intense online combat experience, being dropped immediately into the action leaves you "somewhat bewildered" and doesn't give you that "feeling of connection" to the game. GameTrailers described Warhawk as "simply fun, easy to compete, but challenging to shine." Adam Sessler from X-Play complimented the game's multiplayer only style saying "...I wouldn't have it any other way." Gaming Target selected Warhawk as one of their "52 Games We'll Still Be Playing From 2007" and awarded it "PlayStation 3-Exclusive Game of the Year".
