= Calling All Cars! =

2007 video game

- Developer: Incognito Entertainment (Note: Additional work by Santa Monica Studio.)
- Publisher: Sony Computer Entertainment
- Director: David Jaffe
- Composer: Peter McConnell
- Platform: PlayStation 3
- Release: NA: May 10, 2007; JP: May 25, 2007; PAL: June 22, 2007
- Genre: Vehicular combat
- Modes: Single-player, multiplayer

Calling All Cars! is a 2007 vehicular combat video game developed by Incognito Entertainment and published by Sony Computer Entertainment for PlayStation 3. It was released on the PlayStation Network. It was also included for free with a 1-year subscription to Qore.

== Gameplay ==
Calling All Cars! is similar to Twisted Metal, although one critic suggested that an early demo version of the game seemed to have "more in common with NBA Jam than it does Twisted Metal". It employs a top-down 3rd person perspective and cel-shaded graphics. There are bonus vehicles that can be unlocked through the completion of certain tasks, e.g. winning a tournament at Captain difficulty.

The object of the game is to capture escaped convicts while battling against three other bounty hunters who are also trying to capture the criminals. Points are awarded for captured criminals, and the bounty hunter with the most points wins. The game features online multiplayer and split-screen play.

The criminals in question have escaped from a local high-security prison by tunneling out. Criminals emerge from the ground somewhere on the current level and begin to walk around.

To capture a criminal that has just emerged from the ground; the player must follow an above-car arrow to the criminals location, and ram into the criminal. Upon ramming the criminal is launched high into the air, and upon coming down will be captured by the nearest bounty hunter. A targeting reticule appears under the criminal and turns green if the bounty hunter is in the correct position to collect and red if they are not. If there are no bounty hunters present the criminal will continue walking until rammed again. Once a criminal has been captured by a bounty hunter the objective is to take it to one of 6 available incarceration facilities. In order of points these are: 1 point - Police Station, 2 point - Jail, 3 point - Maximum Security, Blue Paddywagon, 4 point - Police Helicopter, 5 point - Red Paddywagon. Once a bounty hunter has captured a criminal, the other bounty hunters objective changes to try to claim the criminal for themselves. This can be done in multiple ways: a high-speed collision, or using one of the three power-ups. These power-ups include a homing missile, a large, front-mounted mallet and a front-mounted magnet. The homing missile and the magnet both have lock-on capabilities, the homing missile emits a sound as it nears lock-on and the magnet's "beam" turns red to indicate successful lock-on. The mallet shows a radius around the bounty hunters vehicle that will be effected. If hit by the mallet or homing missile the criminal launches into the air from the previous bounty hunters car, much akin to if it had been rammed for the first time. If hit in a high-speed collision or caught using the magnet the criminal is transferred directly to the bounty hunter.

Online multiplayer was available until the servers were taken offline in January 2010.

== Reception ==
Reception

Aggregate score
Aggregator	Score
Metacritic	74/100

Review scores
Publication	Score
1Up.com	B+
Edge	6/10
Eurogamer	6/10
GamePro	3.5/5
GameSpot	6.7/10
GameZone	8.4/10
IGN	8.5/10
PlayStation Official Magazine – UK	8/10
PlayStation: The Official Magazine	7/10
X-Play	4/5

The game received "average" reviews according to the review aggregation website Metacritic. GameSpot was positive to the game, but was critical of the lack of content for single-player mode. IGN, however, said that the multiplayer more than makes up for the single player flaws. Some critics slammed the game, which in turn drew a vitriolic response from David Jaffe, stirring up a bit of controversy. Jaffe specifically deemed GameSpot's review to be "unfair", but he later went on to call Calling All Cars! a "mistake", specifically in regard to his choice of giving the game a cartoon look which clashed with the "hardcore" style of gameplay.
