= Twisted Metal: Black =

2001 video game

- North American box art featuring Sweet Tooth
- Developer: Incog Inc. Entertainment (Note: Santa Monica Studio assisted on development.)
- Publisher: Sony Computer Entertainment
- Director: David Jaffe
- Producer: Scott Campbell
- Designer: David Jaffe
- Programmer: Steve Poulson
- Composers: Michael Reagan; Gregory Hainer; Kevin Riepl; Kevin Manthei
- Series: Twisted Metal
- Platform: PlayStation 2
- Release: NA: June 19, 2001; EU: December 7, 2001
- Genre: Vehicular combat
- Modes: Single-player, multiplayer

Twisted Metal: Black is a 2001 vehicular combat game developed by Incog Inc. Entertainment and published by Sony Computer Entertainment for the PlayStation 2. The fifth title of the Twisted Metal series following Twisted Metal 4 (1999), it serves as a reboot of the franchise. It is the first game to be developed by Incog Inc., formed by alumni of SingleTrac—the developers of Twisted Metal (1995) and Twisted Metal 2 (1996). An online enabled multiplayer-only variant, Twisted Metal: Black Online, was released later as a free send-away. The game received acclaim from critics and was nominated for several gaming awards.

It was also the first Twisted Metal released in PAL territories since Twisted Metal 2. Both Twisted Metal: Black and Twisted Metal: Black Online were reissued as part of Sony Greatest Hits program. A standard downloadable version of Twisted Metal: Black is included in the first batch of copies of Twisted Metal (2012) for PlayStation 3, discernible by the "Limited Edition" tab near the top of the cover art. In December 2015, the game was made available for the PlayStation 4 through the PlayStation Network.

== Gameplay ==
Sweet Tooth on Snowy Roads, colliding with Yellow Jacket, while Crazy 8 (on the right) launches a fire missile towards Axel

Twisted Metal: Black is a vehicular combat game centered on arena-style battles in which players control heavily armed vehicles and attempt to destroy opponents. The premise is set around a tournament organized by a mysterious man named Calypso, who pits a selection of deranged asylum inmates against one another. The core objective in most modes involves eliminating a set number of enemy drivers (typically six to eight) within a single level to advance. Players begin each level with two lives, and can recharge their vehicle's health meter at designated stations that work a limited amount of times. The controls support multiple configurations, ranging from a "classic" setup that designates weapons to the shoulder buttons to more specialized "Run and Gun" and "Control Freak" layouts. The left analog stick typically handles steering while the right manages acceleration and braking. Pressing the analog sticks enables turbo boosts and tight turns. Each vehicle exhibits unique performance traits: lighter models like the motorcycle Mr. Grimm prioritize speed and agility at the expense of armor, whereas heavier trucks such as Darkside offer greater durability but reduced maneuverability.

Combat revolves around a variety of weapons along with limited-use specials. Every vehicle features a standard machine gun with unlimited ammunition, though these can overheat with prolonged use, necessitating a cool-down period. The machine guns can be supplemented by additional weapon pickups scattered throughout the levels. These include homing missiles, power missiles, fire missiles, ricochet projectiles, incendiary gas cans, and multi-missile "Zoomies". Some weapons require precise timing or sustained targeting, such as reticle-locked volleys or delayed satellite strikes. Each character-vehicle combination also possesses a unique special weapon that regenerates over time. Examples include Brimstone's fanatical dynamite-strapped followers who latch onto enemy cars before detonating, or Sweet Tooth's transformation into a rocket-launching form. Beyond standard weapons, players can execute special moves via directional pad or analog stick inputs. These moves, powered by a regenerating energy bar, include abilities such as jumping, freezing opponents, deploying shields, turning invisible, or dropping mines.

The arenas vary in size and layout, ranging from compact snowy roads and highway loops to a massive suburb containing hills, factories, neighborhoods, and an amusement park. Many stages feature dynamic elements; for example, the prison ship level begins with players confined in a cargo hold before opening up as the vessel docks, allowing access to beaches and other surrounding terrain. Nearly every object can be damaged or destroyed, creating new pathways, shortcuts, or hazards. For example, players can dislodge a Ferris wheel to send it rolling across the map, crushing obstacles and enemies. Pedestrians and civilian traffic appear in some areas, though they pose little threat. Many of the levels include changing environmental and lighting conditions.

Twisted Metal: Black offers a number of single-player and multiplayer modes. The Story mode follows an individual character through a series of battles while revealing their backstory via cutscenes. The Challenge mode pits the player against opponents in a selected arena for a single battle, while the Endurance mode presents an endless succession of foes the player must fight using one vehicle. Multiplayer supports two to four players in split-screen deathmatches, with options for free-for-all or team play. Additional cooperative modes allow two players to tackle Story mode together, sharing a pool of lives. The Last Man Standing mode has two players sequentially battling through identical lists of vehicles.

== Release ==
Animation S4, a producer of 3D and Flash animations, created a series of six original Flash "Webisodes" to promote the release of Twisted Metal: Black, beginning with No-Face, and including Billy Ray Stillwell, Sweet Tooth, Dollface, Bloody Mary and Mr. Grimm.

The game was released in North America on June 19th, 2001.

== Reception ==
Reception

Aggregate score
| Aggregator | Score |
|---|---|
| Metacritic | 91/100 |

Review scores
| Publication | Score |
|---|---|
| AllGame | 4.5/5 |
| Edge | 6/10 |
| Electronic Gaming Monthly | 8/10, 9/10, 8.5/10 |
| EP Daily | 9.5/10 |
| Eurogamer | 9/10 |
| Game Informer | 9.5/10 |
| GameRevolution | A− |
| GameSpot | 9.5/10 |
| GameSpy | 94% |
| GameZone | 9.5/10 |
| IGN | 9.6/10 |
| Next Generation | 5/5 |
| Official U.S. PlayStation Magazine | 5/5 |
| X-Play | 5/5 |
| The Cincinnati Enquirer | 4/5 |
| Playboy | 90% |

Twisted Metal: Black received "universal acclaim" according to the review aggregation website Metacritic. Daniel Erickson of NextGen said, "The best car combat game in history is also the most creative. Go get it." Dan Elektro of GamePro said, "If you've lost your taste for Twisted Metal, this is the game that will bring back your appetite. Twisted Metal: Black is car combat action at its best." (Note: GamePro gave the game two 5/5 scores for graphics and sound, and two 4.5/5 scores for control and fun factor.)

Many critics praised its dark and outstanding storylines for each character and its variety of weapons and unlockables, but its hover style controls for not changing much from the previous installments and its unbalanced difficulty were noted criticisms. Maxim gave the game all five stars and called it "a road rager's dream come true". Playboy gave it 90% and called it "fun for the whole family!" The Cincinnati Enquirer gave it four stars out of five and called it "a fight to the finish, so it's important to keep moving and to quickly learn how and when to use each of the weapons".

The game was nominated at The Electric Playground's 2001 Blister Awards for the "Best Multiplayer Console Game" and "Best Console Driving Game" awards, but lost to Halo: Combat Evolved and Grand Theft Auto III, respectively. It was also nominated for the "Best Shooting Game" award at GameSpot's Best and Worst of 2001 Awards, which also went to Halo. The game also came in ninth in their list of the Top 10 Overall. A year later, the Online version was nominated for the "Best Online Game on PlayStation 2" award at their Best and Worst of 2002 Awards, which went to SOCOM U.S. Navy SEALs. During the Academy of Interactive Arts & Sciences' 6th Annual Interactive Achievement Awards, the latter online version received a nomination for the "Online Gameplay of the Year" award, which went to Battlefield 1942.

By July 2006, the game had sold 950,000 units and earned $31 million in the U.S. NextGen ranked it as the 61st highest-selling game launched for the PlayStation 2, Xbox or GameCube between October 2000 and July 2006 in that country.

== Legacy ==
=== Unreleased follow-up ===
Screenshot of Twisted Metal: Harbor City

A sequel project,Twisted Metal: Harbor City, was planned but never officially announced. It was later scrapped.

Details on the game were revealed in the PlayStation 2 port of Twisted Metal: Head-On, Extra Twisted Edition. Harbor City was meant to feature interconnected levels to offer a sense of a continuous world as opposed to the discrete stages of the main game. The four completed levels were included in the game as a bonus feature entitled Twisted Metal: Lost.
