= David Jaffe =

American video game designer (born 1971)

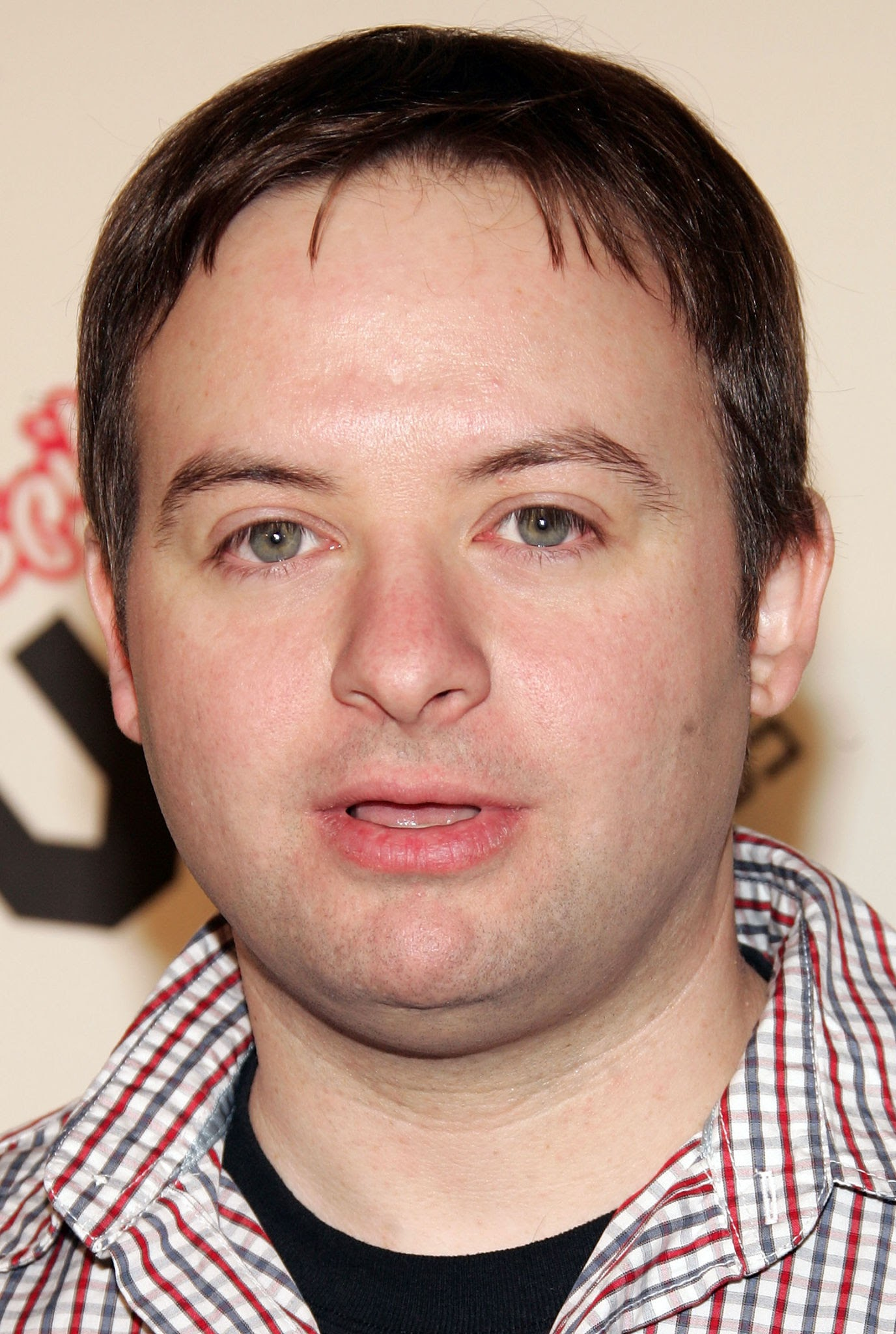
- Jaffe in 2005
- Born: April 13, 1971 (age 55); Birmingham, Alabama, U.S.
- Known for: Twisted Metal series God of War series
- Website: criminalcrackdown.blogspot.com

David Scott Jaffe (born April 13, 1971) is an American video game designer best known for directing the Twisted Metal and God of War series. In 2009, he was chosen by IGN as one of the top 100 game creators of all time.

== Biography ==
Jaffe is originally from Birmingham, Alabama and currently resides in San Diego, California. He was born to a Jewish family. Jaffe graduated from Alabama's Mountain Brook High School, located in Mountain Brook, AL, a suburb of Birmingham. Jaffe then attended the University of Southern California in Los Angeles.

Jaffe is known for directing the Twisted Metal series and God of War. Jaffe's Twisted Metal: Black and God of War both ranked in IGN's "Top 25 PS2 Games of All Time", with Twisted Metal: Black in ninth place and God of War winning first place as IGN's best PS2 game of all time. In 2007, Jaffe left SCEA then founded Eat Sleep Play. The studio signed a multi-year deal with Sony to create games exclusively for PlayStation platforms. He left Eat Sleep Play in February 2012 due to creative differences.

In 2014, Jaffe announced his first project from his new studio The Bartlet Jones Supernatural Detective Agency called Drawn to Death as a PlayStation 4 exclusive. The game received mixed reviews, and due to the cancellation of an unannounced title, his newfound company shut down a year later. Jaffe expressed disdain for the mixed critical reception and insisted the reception from players of the game was more positive.

Jaffe has served as a creative consultant for Polish developer Movie Games.

== Works ==
Games
Year	Game	Console(s)	Credited as
1993	Cliffhanger	NES, Super NES, Mega Drive/Genesis, Game Boy, Game Gear	Tester
1993	Skyblazer	Super NES	Tester
1994	Mickey Mania	Super NES, Mega Drive/Genesis, Mega CD/Sega CD	Game designer
1995	Twisted Metal	PC/PlayStation	Game designer
1996	Twisted Metal 2	PC/PlayStation	Game director, producer, and designer
2001	Twisted Metal: Black	PS2	Game director, lead designer
2001	Kinetica	PS2	Game designer
2005	God of War	PS2	Game director, lead designer
2005	Twisted Metal: Head-On	PSP	Game director, designer
2007	God of War II	PS2	Creative director
2007	Calling All Cars!	PS3	Game director
2008	Twisted Metal Head On: Extra Twisted Edition	PS2	Game director, designer
2012	Twisted Metal	PS3	Game director
2017	Drawn to Death	PS4	Game director

Television
Year	Title	Roles	Notes
2007	Code Monkeys	Himself (voice)	Episode: "Just One Of The Gamers"
