= Twisted Metal 2 =

1996 vehicular combat video game

- North American PlayStation cover art
- Developers: SingleTrac; Sony Interactive Studios America
- Publishers: Sony Computer Entertainment; Sony Interactive Studios America (Windows)
- Producer: David Jaffe
- Writer: David Jaffe
- Series: Twisted Metal
- Platforms: PlayStation, Windows
- Release: PlayStation: NA: November 8, 1996; EU: February 1997; Microsoft Windows: NA: November 13, 1997
- Genre: Vehicular combat
- Modes: Single-player, multiplayer

Twisted Metal 2 (Note: Known in Europe as Twisted Metal World Tour) is a vehicular combat video game developed by SingleTrac and published by Sony Computer Entertainment. The second game in the Twisted Metal series, it was originally released in 1996 for PlayStation and Windows.

The Microsoft Windows version features slightly cut-down graphics compared to the PlayStation version but doesn't require a 3D accelerator video card. It also features multiplayer mode over a modem line or Internet.

Two years after its release, Twisted Metal 2 was re-released as part of the PlayStation's Greatest Hits imprint. However, the re-release was published under 989 Studios, a subsidiary of Sony Computer Entertainment America. It was also released for download on the PlayStation Network in Japan on July 26, 2007 and North America on November 1, 2007. On July 18, 2023, it was then made available for PlayStation 4 and PlayStation 5.

== Gameplay ==
Roadkill in Paris colliding with Mr. Slam and throwing its special weapon

In concept, Twisted Metal 2 is a demolition derby which permits the usage of ballistic projectiles. Players choose a vehicle and an arena—or a series of arenas in the story mode—to engage in battle with opposing drivers. A variety of weapons are obtainable by pick-ups scattered throughout the stage. The objective of the game is to be the last remaining player. Two player duel mode makes a return from the first Twisted Metal, and a co-operative mode allows players to fight through tournament mode with a teammate. There is no ending if the game is completed in co-operative mode.

== Plot ==
In 2006, Los Angeles is in ruins and its citizens left to struggle for survival after the conclusion of Twisted Metal, a brutal contest held by Calypso, exactly one year earlier on Christmas Eve. Aboard his airship (running the ticker "CALYPSO RULER OF THE EARTH") in the skies over the destroyed City of Angels, Calypso wonders where the next Twisted Metal will take place; fourteen of the world's best drivers are already assembled to compete for whatever prize they desire. Ultimately, Calypso decides that the world itself shall serve as a battleground. In addition to the remains of Los Angeles, drivers will also battle in Moscow, Paris, Amazonia, New York City, Antarctica, the Netherlands, and Hong Kong.

After defeating all the opponents in Amazonia, the player must face Minion before proceeding to New York City. The Dark Tooth boss fight takes place after the player defeats all the opponents in Hong Kong; once Dark Tooth (and his flaming head) is defeated, the driver meets with Calypso in New York to receive their prize.

== Development ==
SingleTrac began brainstorming ideas for a Twisted Metal sequel in late 1995. Due to the success of the original, Twisted Metal 2 was allotted 16 months for development, much longer than the previous game.

== Reception ==
Reception

Aggregate score
Aggregator	Score
GameRankings	(PS) 86.44% (PC) 49.50%

Review scores
Publication	Score
AllGame	(PS) 4.5/5 (PC) 4/5
Edge	(PS) 7/10
Electronic Gaming Monthly	(PS) 8/10, 8.5/10, 8.5/10, 8/10
Famitsu	(PS) 26/40
Game Informer	(PS) 8.75/10
GameRevolution	(PS) B+ (PC) B
GameSpot	(PS) 8.8/10 (PC) 6.4/10
IGN	(PS) 7.3/10
Next Generation	(PS) 4/5
PC Gamer (US)	(PC) 80%
Play	(PS) 88%

Twisted Metal 2 was both a financial and critical success. The PlayStation version sold 1.74 million copies in the United States alone. The PlayStation version has an aggregate score of 86.44% on GameRankings, based on eight reviews. The PC version averages 49.50% on the same website, based on two reviews.

Critics generally regarded the game as an improvement over the original Twisted Metal due to its larger, more intricate levels and better cast of characters. However, they were divided about the graphics. The four reviewers of Electronic Gaming Monthly said that the original Twisted Metal had mediocre graphics and the sequel made no improvement. GameSpot's Jeff Kitts agreed that there was no improvement but felt the graphics still held up well. GamePro said the graphics are better than the first game but still mediocre in absolute terms, citing bland and featureless buildings, pixelation, and breakup when close to walls, while Next Generation claimed, "TM2 shows significant improvement with sharper textures, a significant reduction in clipping, and even an improved frame rate." Both GameSpot and Next Generation attested that the essential nature of the gameplay was unchanged from the original, and that no change was needed. GamePro opined that "intense gameplay is what saves, and makes, the game - especially in the two-player head-to-head mode." Crispin Boyer wrote in Electronic Gaming Monthly that "I wasn't all that crazy about the first Twisted Metal, but this sequel is worlds better, even though it looks like the same old thing at first glance.

Twisted Metal 2 was a runner-up for Electronic Gaming Monthly's Action Game of the Year (behind Die Hard Trilogy). The following year EGM ranked the PlayStation version number 64 on their "100 Best Games of All Time", commenting that "The sheer amount of different vehicles, levels and weapons available at your disposal makes for awesome multiplayer matches." In 2003, Twisted Metal 2 was inducted into GameSpot's list of the greatest games of all time.

Frosty Treats, a major ice cream truck company, filed a lawsuit against Sony contending that Twisted Metal 2 infringed on the company's trademarks through the use of the phrase "Frosty Treats", as well as similarities between the video game clown Sweet Tooth and the company's own safety clown. In Frosty Treats, Inc. v. Sony Computer Entertainment America, Inc., the U.S. Court of Appeals for the Eighth Circuit ruled against the trademark claims because they were either too generic or were unlikely to cause confusion among consumers.

== See also ==
- List of Sony Greatest Hits games
- List of best-selling video games
