= Twisted Metal =

Vehicular combat video game series

- Genre: Vehicular combat
- Developers: SingleTrac (1995–1997); Sony Interactive Studios America/989 Studios (1995–1999); Incognito Entertainment (2001–2007); Eat Sleep Play (2008–2012)
- Publisher: Sony Interactive Entertainment
- Creators: David Jaffe; Scott Campbell
- Platforms: PlayStation; PlayStation 2; PlayStation 3; PlayStation Portable; Microsoft Windows
- First release: Twisted Metal; November 5, 1995
- Latest release: Twisted Metal; February 14, 2012

Twisted Metal is a series of vehicular combat video games originally developed by SingleTrac and published by Sony Interactive Entertainment. The series has appeared on the PlayStation, PlayStation 2, PlayStation Portable and PlayStation 3. As of October 31, 2000, the series had sold 5 million copies. Several of the games in the series were re-released as part of the Sony Greatest Hits program. The original game and its first sequel were also released for the PC.

== Overview ==
Each game in the series revolves around demolition derbies where competitors use weapons including ballistic projectiles, machine guns, and explosives. Players choose a vehicle (each with a corresponding character) and an arena—or a series of arenas in the story mode—to engage in battle with opposing drivers. The last driver alive is the winner.

The series's plot revolves around the eponymous Twisted Metal tournament, a yearly contest made up of a series of derbies. In almost all of the games, the host is a man called "Calypso"; in the series' fourth installment, perennial contestant Sweet Tooth briefly takes over. The winner of the contest is granted one wish. Typically, this wish has unexpected consequences for the winner, similar to traditional stories where characters are punished for greedy wishes.

== Games ==
Release timeline Main releases in bold
1995	**Twisted Metal** (1995)
1996	**Twisted Metal 2**
1997
1998	**Twisted Metal III**
1999	**Twisted Metal 4**
2000
2001	**Twisted Metal: Black**
2001	Twisted Metal: Small Brawl
2002
2003	Twisted Metal: Black Online
2004
2005	**Twisted Metal: Head-On**
2006–2007
2008	Head-On: Extra Twisted Edition
2009–2011
2012	**Twisted Metal** (2012)

=== Main games ===
==== Twisted Metal (1995) and Twisted Metal 2 (1996) ====
The first two Twisted Metal games were developed by SingleTrac.

Windows versions of Twisted Metal and Twisted Metal 2 exist. Twisted Metal 2 on PC is built on an earlier version of the game (minor details of some levels disappeared) but it doesn't require a 3D accelerator video card and played well on computers with lower processing capabilities. It also features multiplayer over a modem line or Internet.

==== Twisted Metal III (1998) and Twisted Metal 4 (1999) ====
Both games were developed and published by 989 Studios due to SingleTrac's dispute with Sony and sale to GT Interactive rendered them unable to develop more Twisted Metal games. David Jaffe, in speaking about these two entries in the series, was reported to have said, "....[in and of themselves] they're good games, they're just not good Twisted Metal games".

==== Twisted Metal: Black (2001) ====
After developing several non-Twisted Metal vehicular combat games for GT Interactive, a large number of SingleTrac employees left the company to form the gaming studio Incog Inc. Entertainment, and signed with Sony to develop another installment of the series on the PlayStation 2, Twisted Metal: Black. It serves as a reboot for the series, with returning characters having drastically changed appearances alongside newcomers.

==== Twisted Metal: Head-On (2005) ====
Despite what was essentially a complete relaunch and rebranding of the franchise with Twisted Metal: Black, Incognito decided to return to the series' roots and create a game that felt more like a true follow-up to the original Twisted Metal series, bringing back the bright colors and cartoony characters of Twisted Metal 1 and 2. Available on the PSP in time for its North American launch and utilizing the PSP's built-in online capabilities, it also marked the first time a Twisted Metal game had full online play available from the start.

==== Twisted Metal: Head-On: Extra Twisted Edition (2008) ====
In February 2008, Eat Sleep Play, a new development studio formed by David Jaffe and Scott Campbell, released Twisted Metal: Head-On for the PlayStation 2. While primarily a direct port of the PSP game "Twisted Metal: Head-On", it does feature a number of extra features, most notably four complete and playable levels from the unreleased/incomplete Twisted Metal: Black sequel, called Twisted Metal: Harbor City. Other bonus content includes: a code to download the soundtrack (a timed offer which has since expired); a half-hour documentary on the series with some of the original developers called "Dark Past"; a rough playable portion of an unfinished and unreleased third person action game starring Sweet Tooth (controllable for the first time ever on-foot and outside of a vehicle); and the never before seen original live-action ending videos of all the characters from the first Twisted Metal, directed by Jaffe.

==== Twisted Metal (2012) ====
Twisted Metal (2012) is the most recent game in the Twisted Metal series. It features multiple drivers and tracks. It also features multiplayer gameplay and other game modes. The game consists of three story arcs that focus on Sweet Tooth, Mr. Grimm and Dollface.

The game was originally set to release in October 2011, but was delayed to early 2012, the reason being for the developers to polish and have more time to work on the game, according to Jaffe.

=== Spin-off games ===
==== Twisted Metal: Small Brawl (2001) ====
Instead of delivering a PlayStation 2 follow-up to Twisted Metal: Black, Incognito took an unexpected turn and developed Twisted Metal: Small Brawl for the original PlayStation, a Twisted Metal aimed at a younger audience that featured radio-controlled toy cars instead of full-size vehicles.

==== Twisted Metal: Black Online (2002) ====
Platform: PlayStation 2

A game featuring only the multiplayer portion of Twisted Metal: Black, but playable online. A free copy could originally be obtained by mailing in a card that came packaged with the PlayStation 2 online network adapter. After Sony stopped offering the disc, it was later included as a bonus disc in subsequent reissues of the Greatest Hits version of Twisted Metal: Black. The official servers to the game have since been shut down.

=== Cancelled games ===
==== Twisted Metal: Harbor City ====
A sequel to the PlayStation 2 game Twisted Metal: Black, titled Twisted Metal: Harbor City, was in development but was cancelled before it was announced when the series co-creators left the development team. At the time of cancellation four levels had been completed; these levels were included in Twisted Metal Head-On: Extra Twisted Edition as part of Twisted Metal: Lost.

==== Twisted Metal: Apocalypse ====
A Twisted Metal game set in a post-apocalyptic environment, which was originally in development in 2008 but was scrapped. Artwork of the cancelled game was released by David Jaffe at San Diego Comic-Con; it showcased concept arts of locations such as a destroyed Mount Rushmore as well as a giant crater. Eat Sleep Play team was originally rather keen on the idea, though it was hinted by Jaffe that the idea was rejected by Sony Computer Entertainment, speculated to be because of the release of MotorStorm: Apocalypse, a racing game which also featured a post-apocalyptic environment.

==== Twisted Metal: Revolution ====
Apart from Twisted Metal: Apocalypse, another Twisted Metal game was in development for the PlayStation 3 which utilized street culture and hip-hop influence. The game was titled Twisted Metal: Revolution, but it was cancelled; it would have featured characters with a more realistic look such as a Sweet Tooth that looked more of a smooth criminal rather than a psychopathic clown. Other characters included Yakuza, FBI agents and street gang members. David Jaffe compared the game to Rockstar's Midnight Club series when describing the look and feel of the game. In addition, Jaffe said that it was extremely difficult to portray the environments that they had created in their concept art within the game as it resulted in an extremely bland environment.

==== Unannounced live-service game ====
A multiplayer, live-service Twisted Metal game was reportedly cancelled in February 2024 early on in its development, in part due to mass layoffs at PlayStation Studios. It was originally conceptualised by UK-based studio Lucid Games, but was later handed to Firesprite. Not much is known about the game and it was never officially greenlit, but it was planned for release on the PlayStation 5. Known internally as Project Copper, it was said to combine the series typical vehicular combat with battle royale mechanics.

== Other media ==
=== Comic book ===
A one-shot Twisted Metal 2 comic book was published by DC Comics in 1996, written by Jamie Delano, pencilled by Phil Hester and inked by Peter Gross. The comic was given out as a prize in a promotional contest held in the Tips & Tricks magazine.

=== Cancelled film adaptation ===
In February 2012, Sony Pictures Entertainment was bringing Twisted Metal to theaters by hiring Brian Taylor to write and direct the film. Five years later in September, Brian Taylor confirmed that Sony had passed on the Twisted Metal film, feeling the series fanbase did not warrant the higher budget it would have cost to realize it.

Twisted Metal was the inspiration for Slaughter Race, a fictional video game featured in the Disney animated film Ralph Breaks the Internet (2018).

=== Television adaptation ===
In May 2019, Sony Pictures Entertainment chairman and CEO Tony Vinciquerra spoke about developing a television adaptation of the Twisted Metal franchise, saying his division would be working closely with the Sony PlayStation division through a new production team created to help Sony produce television projects based on their gaming IPs. In February 2021, a Twisted Metal TV series was moving forward, with Rhett Reese and Paul Wernick helping to develop the series, with Michael Jonathan Smith writing the series and executive producing the series alongside Will Arnett, Reese, Wernick, Marc Forman, Peter Principato, Asad Qizilbash, Carter Swan, and Herman Hulst. Later in September, Anthony Mackie was announced in the role of John Doe, and later officially confirmed to be starring and executive producing the series, which had been given a series order at Peacock. In May 2022, Stephanie Beatriz, Thomas Haden Church and Neve Campbell joined the cast. Will Arnett was hired to voice Sweet Tooth in June, with Samoa Joe physically performing the role. Mike Mitchell plays Stu, the best friend of Mike, who is played by Tahj Vaughans. Lou Beatty Jr. plays a character named Tommy. The first season was released on Peacock on July 27, 2023. A second season premiered on July 31, 2025, with a third season currently in post-production.

== See also ==
- Critical Depth
- Rogue Trip: Vacation 2012
- Vigilante 8
- PlayStation All-Stars Battle Royale
