= Jet X2O =

2002 racing video game

- Developer: Killer Game
- Publisher: Sony Computer Entertainment
- Platform: PlayStation 2
- Release: NA: October 29, 2002
- Genre: Racing
- Modes: Single-player, multiplayer

Jet X2O is a 2002 racing video game developed by Killer Game and published by Sony Computer Entertainment for the PlayStation 2. It was released only in North America.

The game involves the player racing a jetski on various courses while maneuvering the vehicle around various obstacles. Unlike similar games like those in the Wave Race series, however, Jet X2O also places emphasis on performing tricks (which is a hallmark of many winter sports video games, including the SSX series).

Despite the game's title, the game is not considered a spin-off of the Jet Moto series.

== Gameplay ==
Jet X2O has several gameplay modes:

- World Tour: The player completes a series of a predetermined number of races (which consist of six competitors per race) at all venues in order; four races are done on the Amateur difficulty, which then increases to six on Pro and eight on Expert, respectively. In order to advance to the next race, the player must accumulate enough standings points; this is determined by a combination of trick score and fastest time. After the end of each, the player is given the opportunity to increase their watercraft's attributes. Once the Amateur and Pro seasons are completed, two additional venues are unlocked. Completing the Amateur season unlocks another generic watercraft (and if necessary another character), while completing the Pro season unlocks a particular character's signature watercraft. Additional items, like watercraft decals and alternate outfits, can also be unlocked by completing this mode on Expert difficulty. In order to unlock everything, this mode must be completed 24 times (three for each character).
- Single Event: The player can select any venue that is already unlocked to participate in one event. Three event types are available:
  - Combo Mode: A race between six competitors which is determined by a combination of trick score and fastest time.
  - Trick Mode: A single-competitor event where the player is allowed an initial time of two minutes to complete as many tricks as possible. Completing a series of tricks adds time to the clock; the maximum time that can be added for each trick combination is one minute. Multiplier pickups (x2, x3, and x5) are available on some of the ramps. The event ends when time runs out or the finish line is crossed, whichever comes first.
  - Race Mode: A single-competitor or dual-competitor event where the player(s) have to go through a series of booster gates.

There is also a practice mode known as Big Wave.

The turbo meter is an important aspect of the game; performing tricks correctly and going through booster gates increases the amount of turbo that is available, while failing any tricks decreases it. When two tricks are performed, the trick score is multiplied by 1.5; when three or more tricks are performed, the multiplier is one whole number less than the number of tricks performed. Once the turbo meter reaches the "Mega" level, the player has a limited amount of time to perform any special tricks.

== Reception ==
Reception

Aggregate score
Aggregator	Score
Metacritic	66/100

Review scores
Publication	Score
AllGame	2.5/5
Electronic Gaming Monthly	8.5/10
Game Informer	7.5/10
GamePro	3.5/5
GameRevolution	C+
GameSpot	7.2/10
GameSpy	2/5
GameZone	8/10
IGN	7/10
Official U.S. PlayStation Magazine	2/5

The game received "average" reviews according to the review aggregation website Metacritic. There were complaints about the limited number of characters available in comparison to Wave Race: Blue Storm and Splashdown (which were released in the year prior to the game's release), as well as the game's overall difficulty. However, the game was praised for its graphics and its frame rate, as well as the design of its courses and the simple trick performing mechanism.
