= MX vs. ATV Supercross =

2014 video game

- Developer: Rainbow Studios
- Publisher: Nordic Games
- Series: MX vs. ATV
- Platforms: PlayStation 3; Xbox 360; Microsoft Windows (Encore); PlayStation 4 (Encore); Xbox One (Encore)
- Release: PlayStation 3 & Xbox 360: WW: 28 October 2014; Encore Edition; Microsoft Windows: WW: 5 March 2015; PlayStation 4: WW: 27 October 2015; Xbox One: WW: 15 July 2016
- Genre: Racing
- Modes: Single-player, multiplayer

MX vs. ATV Supercross is a racing video game developed by Rainbow Studios and published by Nordic Games for PlayStation 3 and Xbox 360. This is the fifth game in the MX vs. ATV franchise and is the first game developed after the original creator of the franchise, Rainbow Studios, separated from their most recent publisher THQ due to bankruptcy. An updated version, known as MX vs. ATV Supercross Encore, was released in 2015 for Microsoft Windows and PlayStation 4 and Xbox One in July 2016.

== Gameplay ==
The core focus of the game allows for the player to race supercross on motocross bikes or ATVs, similar to Reflex, Alive and the Nintendo DS version of Untamed. The game features 17 Supercross Tracks for both MX and ATV riding and a career mode with 5 series (250 East, 250 West, 450 MX, 450 ATV, 450 MX vs. ATV). There are also more than 80 motocross companies in the game to ensure authenticity and 40 riders to race against. New physics and control system including reinterpreting the "pre-load" from the original MX vs ATV games is also introduced in the new game. The game received regular content updates. As for multiplayer, it can have up to 12 players. Split-screen is also available for two local players.

== Development ==
During THQ's bankruptcy, Nordic Games purchased the rights to MX vs. ATV, along with Red Faction and Darksiders as well as rights to THQ's other owned software and licensed software for $4.9 million in total during an assets auction. As the fifth entry in the series, the game was originally set for release on 9 September 2014, but was pushed back and released on 28 October. The PlayStation 4 and Xbox One version of the game titled MX vs. ATV Supercross Encore, were bundled together with MX vs. ATV Alive and released worldwide in late 2015, containing new features for this edition. It was also released for Microsoft Windows and entered Steam's early access.

== Reception ==
Reception

Aggregate scores
Aggregator	Score
GameRankings	(X360) 50% (PS3) 65%
Metacritic	(PS3) 58/100 (X360) 48/100 (XONE) 45/100 (PS4) 42/100

Review scores
Publication	Score
GameRevolution	2/5
Hardcore Gamer	3/5

MX vs. ATV: Supercross received mixed reviews from critics. The Xbox 360 version received an aggregated score of 55.00% from GameRankings and 57/100 from Metacritic.

Jeremy Peeples from Hardcore Gamer gave the game a 6/10, praising the soundtracks but had a mixed opinion about the graphics as he described it "a perplexing blend of impressive and sub-par". He summarized the game by saying that "MX vs. ATV Supercross doesn't reinvent the wheel. Those who enjoyed past entries will enjoy this one and get a kick out of the new right-stick jumping and aiming mechanic. It is easy to like, but hard to feel passionate about".

Devin Charles from Game Revolution gave the game a 4/10, praising the customization options, but criticizing the uninventive gameplay, poor control and handling, unnatural turning mechanics, as well as the poor graphics.
