= MX Unleashed =

2004 video game

- Developers: Rainbow Studios; Humagade (mobile)
- Publisher: THQ
- Programmer: Glenn O'Bannon
- Series: MX
- Platforms: PlayStation 2 Xbox mobile phone
- Release: NA: February 17, 2004; NA: August 19, 2004 (mobile); EU: March 26, 2004; AU: 2004 (PS2)
- Genre: Racing
- Modes: Single-player, multiplayer

MX Unleashed (known in Australia as Chad Reed MX Unleashed) is a 2004 racing video game developed by Rainbow Studios and published by THQ for PlayStation 2, Xbox and mobile phones. The game is also backwards compatible for the Xbox One as of April 2018. It was also made free for Xbox Live Gold members in August 2020.

As a sequel to Locomotive Games' MX 2002 featuring Ricky Carmichael and MX Superfly, Unleashed is the third and final game in THQ's MX trilogy before Rainbow Studios began the MX vs. ATV series one year later with MX vs. ATV Unleashed, which is a crossover with Sony's ATV Offroad Fury series.

== Gameplay ==
The sharp controls allow for the players to weave around obstructions in the course as well as other opponents controlled by artificial intelligence. The turns are very tight and the responsiveness of the controls allow the player to do as many tricks as possible before landing after a jump. To gain more height on the jumps to do more tricks, the player can make the bike rider push back on the shocks at the bottom of a hill and release them at the top to create a springboard-like effect, and go to heights unattainable without doing so. The player's speed, bike angle, and rider posture all affect how the bike responds to the ground it is driving over. In the career mode, the player must place in the top three to unlock another race, with unlimited tries allowed to make the podium finish. The freestyle mode is much different. There are a variety of challenges one has to complete in order to unlock more challenges and move on to another freestyle map. The challenges include a series of targets that the player's bike must land on after every jump, a timed freestyle measured by the number of points scored in the time frame, a race against a different vehicle across the 5 different freestyle maps such as a monster truck, a biplane, a dune buggy, a trophy truck, or a helicopter, and a contest in which the player must hit ten targets after jumps before the other seven racers. Successfully completing a challenge will unlock a more difficult version of it, as well as more challenges.

== Development ==
As Rainbow Studios was completing the first two installments of the ATV Offroad Fury series, which released to critical acclaim, THQ took notice of the games' high quality and wanted its next MX game to run on their engine, one factor that resulted in its decision to acquire that developer. Following this acquisition, Rainbow Studios relinquished control of the ATV Offroad Fury series to Climax Studios and drew upon prior experience in developing high-quality motocross racing games after the success of Microsoft's PC-exclusive Motocross Madness duology to make a MX game with the high level of quality THQ expected. This involved utilizing various graphical enhancements and effects from its prior off-road racing titles such as cleanly dynamic fog effects, a high draw distance and large, detailed race environments with many small objects that could be interacted with, as well as realistic physics. The Australian release was endorsed by Australian pro motocross racer Chad Reed. Everywhere else, the game received no endorsement from any pro MX racer and had its full title simply shortened to MX Unleashed.

== Reception ==
Reception

Aggregate score
Aggregator	Score	
Aggregator	PS2	Xbox
Metacritic	80/100	81/100

Review scores
Publication	Score	
Publication	PS2	Xbox
Electronic Gaming Monthly	8/10	8/10
Game Informer	8/10	8/10
GameSpot	7.9/10	7.9/10
GameSpy	4/5	4/5
GameZone	N/A	7.7/10
IGN	8.8/10	8.8/10
Official U.S. PlayStation Magazine	4/5	N/A
Official Xbox Magazine (US)	N/A	8.1/10
TeamXbox	N/A	8.6/10
X-Play	N/A	4/5
The Village Voice	N/A	8/10

MX Unleashed received "generally positive" reviews, according to review aggregator Metacritic.

By July 2006, the PlayStation 2 version of MX Unleashed had sold 740,000 copies and earned $22 million in the United States. Next Generation ranked it as the 88th highest-selling game launched for sixth-generation consoles between January 2000 and July 2006 in that country. Combined sales of the MX trilogy reached 1.5 million units in the United States by July 2006.
