= Championship Motocross featuring Ricky Carmichael =

1999 racing video game

Championship Motocross Featuring Ricky Carmichael
- Developer: Funcom Dublin
- Publisher: THQ
- Platform: PlayStation
- Release: NA: September 13, 1999; UK: October 29, 1999
- Genres: Racing, sports
- Modes: Single player, multiplayer

Championship Motocross Featuring Ricky Carmichael is a video game developed by Funcom Dublin and published by THQ for the PlayStation in 1999. It is the first of four motocross racing games published by THQ to be endorsed by professional motocross racer Ricky Carmichael. A sequel, Championship Motocross 2001 Featuring Ricky Carmichael, was released for Game Boy Color in 2000, and for PlayStation in 2001.

== Development ==
The game was showcased at E3 1999. A port was planned for the Nintendo 64 by Pacific Coast Power & Light, but it was canceled before it began.

== Reception ==
Reception

Aggregate score
Aggregator	Score
GameRankings	77%

Review scores
Publication	Score
AllGame	4.5/5
Electronic Gaming Monthly	6/10
Famitsu	27/40
Game Informer	6.75/10
GameFan	70%
GamePro	3/5
GameSpot	7.1/10
IGN	8.7/10
Next Generation	4/5
Official U.S. PlayStation Magazine	3.5/5

The game received favorable reviews according to the review aggregation website GameRankings. Jeff Lundrigan of NextGen was positive to the game, but noted that its high level of difficulty would frustrate many players. In Japan, where the game was ported and published by MediaWorks with the name Dirt Champ Motocross No. 1 (ダートチャンプ モトクロスNO.1, Dāto Chanpu Motokurosu No. 1) on January 6, 2000, Famitsu gave it a score of 27 out of 40. GamePro gave three 4/5 scores for graphics, sound, and control, and 3/5 for overall fun factor. One GameFan critic gave it a score of 69, and the other 70.

== Legacy ==
THQ's partnership with Carmichael would endure for several more years, resulting in three more motocross racing games that received endorsement from Carmichael: a sequel to the game, titled Championship Motocross 2001 Featuring Ricky Carmichael, followed by what would be the first two installments of the Championship Motocross duology's follow-up series, the MX trilogy: MX 2002 featuring Ricky Carmichael and MX Superfly featuring Ricky Carmichael. This new trilogy, released on sixth-generation platforms, would be a precursor to THQ's racing series, MX vs. ATV, a crossover with Sony's ATV Offroad Fury series.
