= Jet Moto 2 =

1997 video game

- North American box art
- Developers: Sony Interactive Studios America; SingleTrac
- Publisher: Sony Computer Entertainment (Note: Greatest Hits/"Championship Edition" update released by 989 Studios.)
- Director: Steve Cowser
- Producers: Mike Giam; Brian Wiklem; Danny Lunt
- Designers: Mike Mason; Brian Christensen
- Programmer: Travis Hilton
- Composer: Pinnacle Music Group
- Series: Jet Moto
- Platform: PlayStation
- Release: NA: November 11, 1997; PAL: April 1998
- Genre: Racing
- Modes: Single player, multiplayer

Jet Moto 2 (known as Jet Rider 2 in Europe and Jet Moto '98 in Japan) is a racing video game developed by Sony Interactive Studios America and SingleTrac and published by Sony Computer Entertainment for the PlayStation. It is the second installment in the Jet Moto series and the sequel to the 1996 game Jet Moto. It was released in North America on November 11, 1997, in Europe in April 1998, and in Japan on August 6, 1998. In January 2008 Jet Moto 2 was made available for the PlayStation Portable and PlayStation 3 via the PlayStation Network. The Greatest Hits re-release, branded within the game as Jet Moto 2: Championship Edition, is slightly different from the original in that the framerate is increased, the number of competitors is limited to four, and all the original Jet Moto tracks are unlocked from the start.

As with Jet Moto, gameplay in Jet Moto 2 revolves around the use of hoverbikes to traverse a racecourse, similar to modern-day motocross, but with the added ability to traverse water. Reviews for Jet Moto 2 were mixed. Some reviewers were satisfied with the improved controls and variety of tracks over the original, but some found the changes insufficient for what is normally expected of a sequel, and the unusual physics still drew some criticism. Jet Moto 2's popularity would spawn one additional sequel, Jet Moto 3.

== Gameplay ==
Jet Moto 2 retains the splitscreen gameplay from the original while adding more diversified locales in which to race.

Jet Moto 2 retains all of the basic gameplay from its predecessor. Players control hoverbikes which sit close to the ground and can be ridden over land and water. The courses in the game are designed to take advantage of this ability. Characters are split into teams, and bikes are adorned with logos of products such as Mountain Dew and Jet Ski, similar to real-life sponsored racing. The riders received an overhaul, with only a total of ten selectable characters being available, and subsequently only ten racers on the track at any given time.

The number of tracks available greatly increased, with ten new tracks added plus the ability to unlock all of the tracks from the original game. Track designs are more varied in Jet Moto 2, with each level containing a unique theme rather than the shared themes of the original. The courses range from earthquake-damaged cities to desert canyons, ice-covered mountains, a roller coaster, and several other themes.

The difficulty was also increased in Jet Moto 2. In order to conserve CPU cycles for other things the developers used gameplay recordings in place of fully developed racer AI. As a result, most AI racers have a perfect run and any mistakes made by the player result in a quick loss of top racing positions. The Greatest Hits version of the game, dubbed Jet Moto 2: Championship Edition, further changed the gameplay mechanics. All Jet Moto tracks were immediately unlocked for the player. Additionally, the number of in-game racers would be reduced from ten to only four to allow the game to run at 30 frames per second.

== Development ==
An unused cover for the Greatest Hits version, with art and text depicting it as the Championship Edition.

Jet Moto 2's original cut from 20 competitors to 10 was "to open the game up to a broader market, one that wasn't driven by hardcore." Chef Boyardee was one of the new sponsors in the game, however the game's producer, Brian Wiklem fought to ensure the sponsor would not be a rider's sponsor. As a result, Chef Boyardee's logo was added to track advertisements throughout the tracks. Of the ten new tracks created for the game, five concepts were designed by SingleTrac, and five by Wiklem and his assistant. Dual Analog Controllers and the accompanying vibration functions were supported for the first time, but DualShock Controllers were not. As with the first Jet Moto, Axiom Design created the user interface shell for the game. Pinnacle Music Group composed the music for the game.

The Greatest Hits version of the game was never meant to be released in its current form. As the game's production cycle was ending, Wiklem asked SingleTrac to create for him a modified version of Jet Moto 2. This version increased the framerate to 30 frames per second by removing six competitors from races, thus putting less strain on the PlayStation hardware. Additionally, Wiklem requested that all of the original Jet Moto tracks be unlocked at the start of the game. It was branded in-game as Jet Moto 2: Championship Edition.

In re-releasing the game on their Greatest Hits line, Sony contacted Wiklem to create a new master disc for duplication, as the previous master disc was destroyed. Wiklem sent a disc of the altered Championship Edition, notifying Sony of the change and petitioning it be used as the Greatest Hits version; Sony replied that Greatest Hits titles must be the same as the original release version. Dismayed, Wiklem burned a copy of the original version and sent it to Sony for duplication. Due to a mix-up in the duplication process, the modified version of the game was duplicated and not the original version. Sony Digital Audio Disc Corporation contacted Sony Computer Entertainment about the mix up, and eventually the discussions trickled down to Wiklem himself. He told vice president of marketing Jeff Fox that he "did send the right disc, it was properly labeled, and it's not my fault that DADC couldn't read." The situation was put to rest shortly thereafter, with the decision being made not to make any further changes to the Greatest Hits disc.

== Release ==
Jet Moto 2 was renamed for its localized releases in Europe and Japan. Its European title is Jet Rider 2, and its Japanese title is Jet Moto '98.

The game was released on the PlayStation Network in North America on January 24, 2008 and in PAL regions on December 11, 2008.

== Reception ==
Jet Moto 2

Aggregate score
Aggregator	Score
GameRankings	70%

Review scores
Publication	Score
Electronic Gaming Monthly	5.9/10
GameRevolution	B
GameSpot	8.1/10
IGN	7/10
Next Generation	3/5
Official U.S. PlayStation Magazine	3.5/5
Electric Playground	5/10

Jet Moto 2 received mixed reviews from critics. It held a 70.08% at GameRankings, a video game aggregator, based on 12 reviews. Like Jet Moto, the game's popularity would earn it a spot in the PlayStation Greatest Hits. Between the original version and the Greatest Hits Championship Edition, Jet Moto 2 sold over 800,000 copies.

Reviewers disagreed on many points about the game. While many praised the new variety of tracks offered, all four reviewers for Electronic Gaming Monthly complained that the tracks are frustratingly confusing and unfair, and Next Generation opined that the track design "is not nearly as impressive as the first, if only because it's more of the same." On the positive side, GameSpot stated that the variety of courses "take the Jet Moto series yet another step away from the traditional racer." Likewise, while IGN called the physics system "even more over-the-top" and was pleased that "The bike flies about everywhere," GameSpot considered the unexpected results of maneuvers and collisions to be a problem.

Though most critics, even in the more negative reviews for the game, cited improved graphics over the original, Next Generation commented that "what's most distressing is that the graphics haven't been improved. ... Had Singletrac succeeded in making Jet Moto 2 a brand new game with a look to reflect the year between titles, it would've deserved a higher score. As it is, it's just more of the same, with less innovation." A number of critics also found that it is easy to get disoriented and lose track of where the edges of the course are.

Overall opinions also varied to an extent. Contrary to Next Generation, GamePro concluded that while Jet Moto 2 is flawed, it has enough novel features over its predecessor to be worth buying. GameSpot deemed it not quite as good as the original, but still a worthy follow-up. Game Revolution was enthusiastic about the game's play control, though they found the split screen makes the two-player mode too difficult to enjoy. On the more negative end, all four Electronic Gaming Monthly reviewers gave it a 6/10 or lower, with Dan Hsu remarking, "It can't be a good thing when, while playing this game, all I can think of are ways to improve it." IGN praised the bike design and challenging A.I., but felt the game was not unique enough from the original, calling it "Jet Moto 1.5".

== Legacy ==
Jet Moto 2 was the last game developed by SingleTrac for publisher Sony Computer Entertainment, as they would later be acquired by GT Interactive. Pacific Coast Power & Light developed Jet Moto 3, with 989 Studios publishing the third title. Jet Moto 3 was released August 31, 1999 exclusively in North America. To date it is the last title in the series to be released. Two other titles were cancelled during their development. Pacific Coast Power & Light was also developing Jet Moto 2124 for the PlayStation, set over a century after the first three games, however the game was cancelled when Jet Moto 3 showed poor sales. Jet Moto: SOLAR, developed by RedZone Interactive, was also cancelled. SOLAR would have been the first title in the series to appear on the PlayStation 2.
