= Jet Moto (video game) =

1996 video game

- North American PlayStation box art by Sal Velluto
- Developers: Sony Interactive Studios America; SingleTrac
- Publishers: Sony Computer Entertainment; Sony Interactive Studios America (Windows)
- Director: Mike Mason
- Producers: Mike Giam; Danny Lunt
- Composer: Big Idea Music Productions
- Series: Jet Moto
- Platforms: PlayStation, Windows
- Release: PlayStation: NA: November 8, 1996; EU: February 1997; JP: August 7, 1997; Windows: NA: November 13, 1997
- Genre: Racing
- Modes: Single-player, multiplayer

Jet Moto (known as Jet Rider in Europe) is a 1996 racing video game developed by Sony Interactive Studios America and SingleTrac and published by Sony Computer Entertainment for the PlayStation. It was released in North America on October 31, 1996; in 1997 for Europe in February and Japan on August 7. A Windows version was released only in North America on November 13, 1997, by Sony Interactive Studios America. Jet Moto was made available for the PlayStation Portable and PlayStation 3 via the PlayStation Network in February 2007. Developers chose fictional hovering bikes instead of wheeled motorcycles initially to resolve performance concerns. Other performance concerns led the team to develop two different physics systems—one for the player, and one for the 19 computer racers.

Gameplay in Jet Moto revolves around the use of hoverbikes to traverse a race course, similar to modern day motocross, but with the added ability to traverse water. Reviews for the game were generally positive, with the PC version holding 75% and the PlayStation version 78.9% at gaming aggregator GameRankings. Reviewers felt the game had solid gameplay, but criticized its high difficulty. Jet Moto's popularity would earn it a spot in the PlayStation Greatest Hits in August 1998, and it went on to gain two additional sequels, Jet Moto 2 and Jet Moto 3.

== Gameplay ==
In Jet Moto players control hoverbikes known as jet motos. These bikes have the ability to hover over both land and water.

Jet Moto differs from that of a traditional racing game with cars or motorcycles. Players are introduced to the fictional sport of Jet Moto. The bikes, known as jet motos, are hovercraft which can traverse both land and water. The bikes race in groups of twenty in the game's equivalent of motocross. Characters are split into teams, and bikes are adorned with logos of products such as Mountain Dew, Butterfinger and K2 Sports similar to real-life sponsored racing.

In Jet Moto players control hoverbikes in a fictional motor sport. Players race three laps on a given course and earn series points based on their placement at the end of the race. Players can choose to race a single race, a season of races, or a custom season. Players can also unlock additional tracks and a stunt mode by doing well in season competitions.

Courses range from beaches with debris-littered water to swamps and ice-covered mountains. The game has its variant of the traditional race track, but also introduces a new course type known as a Suicide course. Instead of being a continuous loop, these tracks have checkpoints at either end of the course, and the starting grid in the center. Riders race to one end, then turn around to head for the other checkpoint, repeating the process until all laps are complete. This provides a new gameplay dynamic as often the player must navigate oncoming traffic.

The PlayStation version of the game allows for two player splitscreen multiplayer; however, no AI racers are present, which limits the competitors to two. A cheat code would allow two human players to race with the entire field. The PC version allows for fourteen players over an IPX network, Internet TCP/IP and modem-to-modem connections.

== Development ==
Jet Moto features a comic style user interface created by Axiom Design.

Jet Moto was conceived as a "science fiction motocross". The developers chose to create jet motos instead of wheeled motorcycles due to concerns over polygon limitations. Travis Hilton, one of the programmers for the game designed Jet Moto's physics engine. Due to hardware limitations of the PlayStation, only the player used this physics system. Programmer Jay Barnson was tasked with developing a simpler physics system to handle the nineteen AI riders. During development a set of courses set in a stadium were dropped as the developers felt it did not fit the theme of the game.

Developers originally intended for players to be permanently out of a race when falling far off a track, however they came to realize that it was not fun for players "to be forced to go slow or suffer an instant defeat". An attempt was made to give three "strikes" to a rider. Once the rider fell for the third time they were out of the race. Once implemented, the developers noticed that the number of racers remaining at the end of the race was too random to be deemed any fun. In the end the decision was made to simply respawn the character on the track. The PC version was ported in large part by John Olsen, who worked on the port as his first task at SingleTrac. The PC version also features 3Dfx hardware acceleration, which allows for higher resolution gameplay and visual enhancements such as reflective water. Axiom Design created the user interface shell for the game, which has a comic book-inspired feel. The music for Jet Moto was produced by Big Idea Music Productions.

Another SingleTrac game released for the PlayStation at roughly the same time, Twisted Metal 2, allows players to race on a track from Jet Moto by entering a code which appeared in advertisements for the game.

== Reception ==
Reception

Aggregate score
Aggregator	Score
GameRankings	75% (PC); 78.9% (PS1)

Review scores
Publication	Score
Electronic Gaming Monthly	9.2/10 (PS1)
GameRevolution	B+
GameSpot	7.5/10 (PC); 5.8/10 (PS1)
IGN	8.0 (PS1); 7.0 (PSN)
Next Generation	4/5 (PS1)
Electric Playground	6.5/10 (PS1)

Jet Moto received generally positive reviews among critics, with the PC version averaging 75% and the PlayStation version averaging 78.9% at gaming aggregator GameRankings. Due to the game's popularity it was re-released on Sony's budget line, PlayStation Greatest Hits, in August 1998.

The game was most often criticized for its controls and unusual physics, which some reviewers said never feel quite right no matter how long the game is played. Both a Next Generation critic and Air Hendrix of GamePro likened the overall sensation to riding through an atmosphere made of molasses. The controls, along with the opponent AI, contributed to some reviewers concluding the game had an excessively high degree of difficulty. However, the grappling feature was praised for its innovation and for adding greater depth to the challenge.

Several reviewers commented that the graphics are highly uneven, looking impressive in some points and embarrassingly poor in others. GameSpot's review of the PC port praised the 3Dfx support.

Several reviewers praised the soundtrack to the game. Mark Cooke of Game Revolution said the spy film-like title screen music in particular both sounded cool and was appropriate for the game. The surf guitar was a strong point for Electric Playground's Victor Lucas, who cited it as one of the best video game soundtracks of 1996. GameSpot reviewer Shane Mooney also praised the energy of the soundtrack. Air Hendrix said that though the menu music is decent, the in-game music is weak.

While Lucas and GameSpot's Glenn Rubenstein compared Jet Moto unfavorably to Wave Race 64, Next Generation's reviewer argued that "in all fairness, the comparison isn't truly appropriate: where Wave Race is based around an existing vehicle that provides a basis of reference, there is no actual criterion for criticism on whether a jet moto game accurately emulates the 'jet motoing' experience". He concluded that "despite [its] odd control and graphic characteristics, Jet Moto remains a lot of fun. With intense, challenging races featuring twenty competitors on ten unique tracks, it never fails to be compelling". Chris Roper of IGN called it one of the best racing games available for the PlayStation. In contrast, Air Hendrix assessed that it "wipes out all over the pavement with finicky, mushy controls and painful gameplay". Lucas praised the design of the jet moto bikes, stating the design was imaginative and vibrant. Todd Mowatt and Joe Rybicki of Electronic Gaming Monthly gave the game laudatory reviews, saying the track design is its best aspect. Rubenstein concluded that while devout racing game enthusiasts would be pleased at how long it takes to complete the game, the general gamer would have more fun with a game that's easier to learn.

In its PlayStation 3 Retro Roundup, IGN opined the game held up well to its direct competitors at the time, Wave Race 64 and the Wipeout series, then stated Jet Moto was "still a pretty fun experience more than 10 years after its original release".

== Legacy ==
Jet Moto's popularity would spawn two additional sequels, Jet Moto 2, also developed by SingleTrac, and Jet Moto 3, developed by Pacific Coast Power & Light. Two other titles were cancelled during their development. Pacific Coast Power & Light was also developing Jet Moto 2124 for the PlayStation, set over a century after the first three games, however the game was cancelled when Jet Moto 3 showed poor sales. Jet Moto: SOLAR, developed by RedZone Interactive, was also cancelled. SOLAR would have been the first title in the series to appear on the PlayStation 2.

Present-day wishlists for video game sequels have often included Jet Moto. 1UP.com listed a fourth Jet Moto in their "Sequels We Want, and the Formulas They Need" feature, stating that Jet Moto "symbolized everything that made the original PlayStation cooler than anything else at the time". IGN felt similarly, listing Jet Moto in their "Dirty Dozen: Revival of the Fittest" feature, calling the game "a novel racer with enough staying power to make it an instant hit".
