= MX vs. ATV Unleashed =

2005 video game

- Developers: Rainbow Studios; Beenox (PC); THQ Wireless (mobile)
- Publisher: THQ
- Series: MX vs. ATV
- Platforms: PlayStation 2, Xbox, Windows
- Release: PlayStation 2 & Xbox: NA: March 17, 2005 (PS2); NA: March 24, 2005 (Xbox); EU: June 24, 2005; AU: March 13, 2008 (PS2); Microsoft Windows: NA: January 17, 2006; EU: March 17, 2006; AU: October 4, 2007
- Genre: Racing
- Modes: Single-player; Multiplayer

MX vs. ATV Unleashed is a racing simulation action sports console video game created for PlayStation 2, Xbox, Microsoft Windows and mobile phones. Developed by Rainbow Studios and published by THQ, the video game was released in 2005 in North America and Europe. MX vs. ATV Unleashed is a crossover between THQ's MX trilogy (comprising MX 2002 featuring Ricky Carmichael, MX Superfly and MX Unleashed) and Sony's ATV Offroad Fury series, and it features same console support for two players and online support for eight players. The PC version has a "track editor" feature. Online multiplayer was available on Xbox Live until April 15, 2010. MX vs. ATV Unleashed is now playable online again on the replacement Xbox Live servers called Insignia.

A PlayStation Portable port of Unleashed, titled MX vs. ATV: On the Edge, was released in 2006, and a sequel, MX vs. ATV Untamed was released in late 2007.

== PlayStation Portable version ==
A PlayStation Portable version was later released in North America on February 28, 2006, and in Europe on March 17, 2006, as MX vs. ATV: On the Edge. In the PlayStation Portable version, there are several modes of play covering the entire world of pro ATV and MX racing like Hill climb, FMX, supercross, and others. In this game, players can drive not only ATVs and MX bikes but dune buggies, golf carts, stadium trucks, monster trucks and sand rails. Besides obvious graphical differences and the addition of several new playable areas, the game lacks the ability to fly airplanes unlike in the console edition of the game. The game has been marketed as MX vs. ATV: On the Edge in both magazine articles and in the box art, but in the game, it is referred to as MX vs. ATV Unleashed: On the Edge. The game was met with average reception upon release, as GameRankings gave it a score of 69%, while Metacritic gave it 68 out of 100.

== Reception ==
Reception

Aggregate score
Aggregator	Score
Metacritic	(Xbox) 80/100 (PS2) 79/100 (PC) 71/100

Review scores
Publication	Score
Electronic Gaming Monthly	7.17/10
Game Informer	8/10
GameSpot	7.7/10
GameSpy	4/5
GameZone	(PS2) 8.7/10 (PC) 8/10
IGN	9.3/10 (PC) 7.5/10
PlayStation Official Magazine – UK	5/10
Official U.S. PlayStation Magazine	4/5
Official Xbox Magazine (US)	7.6/10
PC Gamer (US)	68%
PlayStation: The Official Magazine	6.5/10
X-Play	4/5
The Sydney Morning Herald	3/5

MX vs. ATV Unleashed received "generally positive" and "mixed or average" reviews, according to review aggregator Metacritic. PlayStation Illustrated gave the game a score of 66%, calling the game "boring".
