= MX vs. ATV =

Off-road racing video game series

- Genre: Racing
- Developers: Rainbow Studios; Locomotive Games; Beenox; Incinerator Studios; Tantalus Media
- Publishers: THQ (2005–11); THQ Nordic (2014–)
- Platforms: PlayStation 2 PlayStation 3 PlayStation 4 PlayStation 5 PlayStation Portable; Xbox; Xbox 360; Xbox One; Xbox Series X/S; Game Boy Advance; GameCube; Nintendo DS; Wii; Nintendo Switch; Microsoft Windows; Mobile
- First release: MX vs. ATV Unleashed; March 16, 2005
- Latest release: MX vs. ATV Legends; June 28, 2022

MX vs. ATV is a racing video game series developed by Rainbow Studios and published by THQ Nordic. It focuses on off-road racing and serves as a successor to THQ's MX series and Rainbow Studios' ATV Offroad Fury series; the latter was developed under Sony Computer Entertainment. The series was originally published by THQ prior to its bankruptcy and liquidation in 2013. As the name suggests, the series' main focus is racing with motocross bikes and all-terrain vehicles, although other vehicles such as dune buggies and sport trucks are also featured in the games. Players can also fly airplanes and helicopters in some of the games.

In August 2011, THQ shut down THQ Digital Phoenix (which Rainbow Studios was known as at the time) as well as other game development studios and did not "actively pursue further development" of the MX vs. ATV franchise in a company re-organization. Nevertheless, the series endured THQ's demise, and in April 2013, Nordic Games acquired the franchise through the liquidation of THQ. Nordic Games then continued the series in 2014 with MX vs. ATV Supercross, then endeavored to bring the series to eighth-generation consoles, porting Supercross to some of them many months later and releasing another sequel for them in 2018, titled MX vs. ATV: All Out. A seventh game for ninth-generation consoles, MX vs. ATV Legends, was released on June 28, 2022.

== Games ==
The MX vs. ATV series is a cumulative crossover between THQ's MX trilogy and Sony's ATV Offroad Fury series. Every game in the franchise prior to MX vs. ATV Reflex was available on the PlayStation 2.

=== MX trilogy ===
MX
- Genre: Racing
- Developers: Locomotive Games; Rainbow Studios
- Publisher: THQ
- Platforms: PlayStation 2 Xbox; Game Boy Advance; GameCube; Mobile
- First release: MX 2002 featuring Ricky Carmichael; June 28, 2001
- Latest release: MX Unleashed; February 17, 2004

The MX series is a trilogy of motocross racing games, all published by THQ between 2001 and 2004, serving as a follow-up to THQ's Championship Motocross featuring Ricky Carmichael duology for the PlayStation, with the sequel also being available on Game Boy Color. Like the Championship duology, the first two installments, 2002 and Superfly, were developed by Locomotive Games and endorsed by Ricky Carmichael, whose likeness went on to appear in some MX vs. ATV video games. The third game, MX Unleashed, was developed by Rainbow Studios, which had started the ATV Offroad Fury series around the time 2002 and Superfly were released and went on to create the MX vs. ATV crossover series a year after Unleashed. All three installments were released on sixth-generation platforms, with the entire trilogy available on the PS2 and Xbox.

The three games in the trilogy are:

- MX 2002 featuring Ricky Carmichael (2001)
- MX Superfly featuring Ricky Carmichael (2002)
- MX Unleashed (2004)

=== ATV Offroad Fury series ===
ATV Offroad Fury
- Genre: Racing
- Developers: Rainbow Studios; Climax Racing
- Publisher: Sony Computer Entertainment
- Platforms: PlayStation 2 PlayStation Portable
- First release: ATV Offroad Fury; February 5, 2001
- Latest release: ATV Offroad Fury 4 October 31, 2006

ATV Offroad Fury is a series of ATV racing games published by Sony Computer Entertainment that ran from 2001 to 2006, consisting of four main titles released on the PlayStation 2. Rainbow Studios developed the first two games of the series, before abandoning it in favor of developing MX Unleashed and the MX vs. ATV series, while passing the development of the ATV Offroad Fury series to Climax Racing, which would produce two more sequels and port them to the PlayStation Portable under different titles.

The main titles of the ATV Offroad Fury series are:

- ATV Offroad Fury (2001)
- ATV Offroad Fury 2 (2002)
- ATV Offroad Fury 3 (2004; ported to the PSP as ATV Offroad Fury: Blazin' Trails in 2005)
- ATV Offroad Fury 4 (2006; loosely ported to the PSP as ATV Offroad Fury Pro in the same year)

=== Main series ===
After the release of the MX trilogy and the first three ATV Offroad Fury games, the MX vs. ATV series began in earnest with MX vs. ATV Unleashed in 2005. Shortly after the series began, the ATV Offroad Fury series quietly concluded with one last sequel, as well as PSP ports of its last two games.

Every game in the series was released on non-Nintendo consoles, with Untamed, Reflex, and All Out also available on at least one Nintendo platform. All games support local split-screen multiplayer racing between 2 players on consoles and PC, while utilizing online multiplayer to support contests with larger player pools. Local wireless multiplayer among up to four players are supported on handheld versions of the games, except the PSP version of Reflex.

| Year | Game | Platform(s) | | | | | | | | | | | | | |
| Year | Game | PS2 | Xbox | PC | Mob | PSP | NDS | Wii | PS3 | X360 | PS4 | NS | XOne | PS5 | SXS |
|---|---|---|---|---|---|---|---|---|---|---|---|---|---|---|---|
| 2005 | MX vs. ATV Unleashed | Yes | Yes | Yes | Yes | Port (Note: Released in 2006 as MX vs. ATV: On the Edge.) | No | No | No | No | No | No | No | No | No |
| 2007 | MX vs. ATV Untamed | Yes | No | No | Yes | Yes | Yes | Yes | Yes | Yes | No | No | No | No | No |
| 2009 | MX vs. ATV Reflex | No | No | Yes | No | Yes | Yes | No | Yes | Yes | No | No | No | No | No |
| 2011 | MX vs. ATV Alive | No | No | No | No | No | No | No | Yes | Yes | No | No | No | No | No |
| 2014 | MX vs. ATV Supercross | No | No | Port (Note: Released in 2015/2016 as MX vs. ATV: Supercross Encore.) | No | No | No | No | Yes | Yes | Port | No | Port | No | No |
| 2018 | MX vs. ATV All Out | No | No | Yes | No | No | No | No | No | No | Yes | Port (Note: Released on September 1, 2020.) | Yes | No | No |
| 2022 | MX vs. ATV Legends | No | No | Yes | No | No | No | No | No | No | Yes | No | Yes | Yes | Yes |

== In other media ==
The game MX vs. ATV All Out is the title sponsor of two US motocross events, despite their omission of all-terrain vehicles: the 2020 Ricky Carmichael Daytona Amateur Supercross at Daytona International Speedway in Daytona Beach, Florida and the final national race in the 2020 AMA Motocross Championship season at Fox Raceway in Pala, California. All Out would also return to be the title sponsor of the subsequent 2021 Ricky Carmichael Daytona Amateur Supercross.
