= Splashdown: Rides Gone Wild =

2003 video game

- Splashdown: Rides Gone Wild cover
- Developer: Rainbow Studios
- Publisher: THQ
- Platforms: PlayStation 2, Mobile
- Release: PlayStation 2: NA: August 4, 2003; EU/AU: October 17, 2003; Mobile phone September 2005
- Genre: Racing
- Modes: Single-player, multiplayer

Splashdown: Rides Gone Wild (also known as Splashdown 2: Rides Gone Wild in Europe) is a 2003 jet ski racing video game developed by Rainbow Studios and published by THQ for PlayStation 2 and mobile phones. It is a sequel to the original Splashdown published by Atari, for the PlayStation 2 and Xbox. The game features a career mode where winning races rewards the player with points which can be used to upgrade items or buy new ones. It also features arcade, training and multiplayer modes. An Xbox version was planned but was canceled, as Rainbow Studios was busy working on MX Unleashed.

== Reception ==
Reception

Aggregate scores
Aggregator	Score	
Aggregator	mobile	PS2
GameRankings	50%	80%
Metacritic	N/A	80/100

Review scores
Publication	Score	
Publication	mobile	PS2
AllGame	N/A	3.5/5
Electronic Gaming Monthly	N/A	7.17/10
Game Informer	N/A	9.25/10
GameRevolution	N/A	B+
GameSpot	3.7/10	8.2/10
GameZone	N/A	9/10
IGN	6.2/10	8.9/10
Official U.S. PlayStation Magazine	N/A	5/5
X-Play	N/A	3/5

The PlayStation 2 version received "favorable" reviews according to the review aggregation website Metacritic.
