= Deadly Tide =

1996 video game

- Developer(s): Rainbow Studios
- Publisher(s): Microsoft
- Producer(s): Earl Jarred
- Programmer(s): Mark DeSimone
- Composer(s): Mark Stratford
- Platform(s): Windows
- Release: NA: November 1996
- Genre(s): Rail shooter
- Mode(s): Single-player

Deadly Tide is a rail shooter video game developed by Rainbow Studios and published by Microsoft exclusively for Microsoft Windows.

== Plot ==
In the year 2445, a race of hostile aquatic aliens arrives on Earth. Four of their ships sit at the bottom of the Pacific Ocean, raising sea levels continuously for 5 years until almost 88% of the surface is submerged. In order to effectively fight the aliens, the fictional Earth Ocean Alliance develops the "Hydras", one-man submarine fighter craft.

The player takes on the role of the last remaining fighter pilot. The objective is to travel through the alien-infested seas and fend off the targets long enough to complete the missions.

The game ends with the player character planting a bomb inside an alien ship and driving away the remaining aliens. However, the player is trapped inside one of the vessels, and his fate is uncertain as the game concludes.

== Gameplay ==
As in Rainbow Studios' other rail shooters The Hive and Ravage D.C.X., the player shoots targets that appear as live sprites in front of a full-motion video background. Occasionally, the video will stop and switch to a still background, which the player can pan around 360 degrees. The weapons include unlimited standard lasers and a limited supply of bombs.

In some levels, the player moves on foot and not in a vehicle. The gameplay, however, remains essentially unchanged.
