= Splashdown (video game) =

2001 video game

- European PlayStation 2 cover art
- Developer: Rainbow Studios
- Publisher: Infogrames, Inc. (Note: Released under the Atari brand name)
- Platforms: PlayStation 2, Xbox
- Release: PlayStation 2: NA: November 6, 2001; EU: November 9, 2001; AU: November 28, 2003; Xbox: NA: June 25, 2002; EU: August 30, 2002; AU: September 20, 2002
- Genre: Racing
- Modes: Single-player, multiplayer

Splashdown is a water racing video game developed by Rainbow Studios and published by Infogrames, Inc. originally for the PlayStation 2 and was later ported to the Xbox. It was released under the Atari brand name.

It received a sequel, Splashdown: Rides Gone Wild, in 2003, and was published by Rainbow Studios' new owner THQ.

== Gameplay ==
Splashdown is quite similar to Nintendo's Wave Race series and Sony Computer Entertainment America's Jet Moto franchise. Players gain control of a personal water craft as they race against each other on various courses. Players must pass through correct sides of buoys in each racetrack, or the personal water craft may stall as a penalty.

== Reception ==
Reception

Aggregate score
Aggregator	Score	
Aggregator	PS2	Xbox
Metacritic	84/100	78/100

Review scores
Publication	Score	
Publication	PS2	Xbox
AllGame	3.5/5	N/A
Electronic Gaming Monthly	7.33/10	N/A
Famitsu	28/40	N/A
Game Informer	9/10	9.25/10
GamePro	4.5/5	4/5
GameRevolution	B+	N/A
GameSpot	7.6/10	8.2/10
GameSpy	85%	4/5
GameZone	9.5/10	N/A
IGN	8.8/10	7.3/10
Official U.S. PlayStation Magazine	4/5	N/A
Official Xbox Magazine (US)	N/A	8.6/10
The Cincinnati Enquirer	N/A	3.5/5

Splashdown received "generally favorable reviews" on both platforms according to the review aggregation website Metacritic. In Japan, Famitsu gave it a score of 28 out of 40 for PlayStation 2 version. It was nominated for GameSpot's 2001 "Best In-Game Water" prize among console games, which went to Wave Race: Blue Storm. The 2002 Xbox version was a runner-up for GameSpot's annual "Best Driving Game on Xbox" award.

During the 5th Annual Interactive Achievement Awards, Splashdown received a nomination for the "Console Racing" award by the Academy of Interactive Arts & Sciences.

== See also ==
- Splashdown: Rides Gone Wild
