= Trimark Pictures =

Defunct US film production and distribution company

Trimark Pictures, Inc.
- Formerly: Vidmark Entertainment (1984–1989)
- Type: Subsidiary
- Industry: Film
- Founded: August 1984; 42 years ago (as Vidmark Entertainment); June 23, 1989; 37 years ago (as Trimark Pictures)
- Founder: Mark Amin
- Defunct: March 12, 2001; 25 years ago
- Fate: Acquired by and folded into Lions Gate, assets currently owned by the said company
- Successor: Lions Gate Films
- Headquarters: Santa Monica, California, United States
- Key people: Mark Amin (chairman & CEO)
- Products: Motion Pictures
- Parent: Vidmark, Inc. (1984–1992); Trimark Holdings (1992–2000); Lions Gate Entertainment (2000–2001)
- Divisions: Trimark Interactive; Trimark Television; Kidmark Entertainment; Trimark Home Video

Trimark Pictures was an American independent production company that specialized in the production and distribution of motion pictures for the home video market. The company was formed in 1984 by Mark Amin as Vidmark Entertainment with Vidmark Inc. (later Trimark Holdings Inc.) established as the holding company. Trimark licensed and distributed theatrical, independent, made-for-TV, along direct-to-video films. The logo features a triangle with a profile of a tiger's head.

Among the company's several releases are Peter Jackson's 1992 film Dead Alive, which they chose to release theatrically due to Jackson's cult following. They are well known for releasing films that considered to be controversial for the time period, as in the case with the 1999 film Better Than Chocolate, as some newspapers refused to carry advertisements for the film that featured the word "lesbian" as part of a critic spot.

== Background ==
Trimark Holdings, Inc.
- Formerly: Vidmark, Inc. (1984–1992)
- Type: Public
- Traded as: Nasdaq: VDMK
- Industry: Entertainment
- Founded: August 1984; 42 years ago (as Vidmark, Inc.); June 1992; 34 years ago (as Trimark Holdings, Inc.)
- Founder: Mark Amin
- Defunct: June 2000; 26 years ago
- Fate: Acquired by Lions Gate Entertainment
- Successor: Lions Gate Entertainment
- Headquarters: Santa Monica, California, United States
- Key people: Mark Amin (Chairman & CEO)
- Subsidiaries: Trimark Pictures; CinemaNow (formerly); Trimark Ultra Sports

Vidmark Entertainment was formed in August 1984 and began operating as a domestic home video distributor in early 1985. In April 1986, Vidmark Entertainment signed a deal with ABC Video Enterprises, to distribute six ABC titles on videocassette. In 1987, Vidmark began distributing and sub-licensing motion pictures for international distribution. That year, the company entered theatrical distribution and production with the acquisition of four films and completion of its first in-house productions, namely American Gothic, That's Adequate, Silent Memory and Born of Fire.

Vidmark Entertainment entered motion-picture production in 1988 with its R-rated feature film Demonwarp.

Trimark picked up its first film, Warlock, a 1989 film starring Julian Sands which was a major theatrical hit. Finally, Trimark made the sequel, titled Warlock: The Armageddon, but officially released in 1993. Trimark also saw success in other intimate film series where the studio produced and distributed its horror film Leprechaun, which released in 1993, starring future Friends actress Jennifer Aniston and Warwick Davis as the sinister leprechaun. The film grossed over $10 million during its theatrical run. One theatrical sequel and four direct-to-video sequels eventually followed. Other Trimark productions included The Dentist, a major hit on the Time Warner-owned, pay-TV channel HBO, Return of the Living Dead III and Pinocchio's Revenge. Trimark also made the dramatic Eve's Bayou, starring Samuel L. Jackson and a young Jurnee Smollett, which received critical acclaim. Trimark also released the miniseries Storm of the Century on home video. On June 29, 1990, Vidmark Entertainment began trading on NASDAQ with the ticker symbol VDMK.

In 1990, the company acquired home video rights to The Amityville Curse and Amityville 4: The Evil Escapes from Academy Entertainment.

At the end of 1991, Vidmark acquired International Broadcast Systems, Ltd. for $1.6 million and renamed the company as Trimark Television. In June 1992, Vidmark, Inc. changed its name to Trimark Holdings, Inc. to reflect Trimark's variegation of its distribution streams. In March 1993, the company formed its virtual division Trimark Interactive. The division expands into the emerging market for interactive software and multimedia. Trimark Interactive's assets were sold to Graphix Zone in March 1997.

In June 2000, Trimark was acquired by Canadian/US film company Lions Gate Entertainment for approximately $50 million in stock and cash including taking on $36 million in debt, with Amin becoming the single largest shareholder of Lions Gate. Trimark was folded into Lions Gate on March 12, 2001.

In 2001, Mark Amin founded Sobini Films, and is its CEO.

In late 2017, Lionsgate launched a channel for all of the Roku streaming players using the Vidmark name and a modified variant of their late 1980s logo, with Lionsgate-owned films, including some from the original Vidmark and Trimark, amongst the selection.

== Filmography ==
| Year | Title | Release date | Distribution | | Notes |
| Year | Title | Release date | Theatrical | Direct to video | Notes |
|---|---|---|---|---|---|
| 1988 | Demonwarp | March 18 | No | Yes | |
| 1988 | Body Beat | November 30 | No | Yes | |
| 1989 | Going Overboard | May 12 | Yes | No | |
| 1989 | A Fool and His Money | September 24 | Yes | No | |
| 1989 | High Stakes | November 17 | Yes | No | |
| 1990 | The Sleeping Car | February 9 | No | Yes | |
| 1990 | The Feud | May 4 | | | |
| 1990 | The Amityville Curse | June 6 | No | Yes | |
| 1990 | Solar Crisis | July 14 | Yes | No | |
| 1990 | Spirits | September 15 | No | Yes | distribution only; produced by Cinema Group |
| 1990 | Mob Boss | September 16 | No | Yes | distribution only; produced by American Independent |
| 1990 | Backstreet Dreams | September 29 | Yes | No | |
| 1990 | Frankenstein Unbound | November 2 | Yes | No | co-production with 20th Century Fox |
| 1991 | Warlock | January 11 | Yes | No | |
| 1991 | Black Magic Woman | April 17 | No | Yes | |
| 1991 | Servants of Twilight | May 31 | Yes | No | |
| 1991 | Kickboxer 2 | June 14 | Yes | No | |
| 1991 | Whore | October 4 | Yes | No | |
| 1991 | Dolly Dearest | October 18 | Yes | No | |
| 1991 | And You Thought Your Parents Were Weird | November 15 | Yes | No | |
| 1991 | All-American Murder | December 1 | No | Yes | Theatrical distribution only |
| 1992 | Into the Sun | January 31 | Yes | No | |
| 1992 | The Psychic | May 20 | Yes | No | |
| 1992 | Interceptor | October 1 | Yes | No | |
| 1992 | Prototype | December 23 | No | Yes | |
| 1993 | Leprechaun | January 8 | Yes | No | |
| 1993 | Dead Alive | February 12 | Yes | No | |
| 1993 | American Kickboxer 2 | August 4 | No | Yes | |
| 1993 | Blink of an Eye | August 26 | No | Yes | |
| 1993 | Warlock: The Armageddon | September 24 | Yes | No | |
| 1993 | Thunder in Paradise | September 27 | No | Yes | |
| 1993 | Deadfall | October 8 | Yes | No | |
| 1993 | Return of the Living Dead III | October 29 | Yes | No | |
| 1993 | Philadelphia Experiment II | November 12 | Yes | No | |
| 1993 | Cyborg 2: Glass Shadow | November 24 | No | Yes | |
| 1994 | Death Wish V: The Face of Death | January 14 | Yes | No | distribution only; produced by 21st Century Film Corporation |
| 1994 | Silent Tongue | February 25 | Yes | No | |
| 1994 | Leprechaun 2 | April 8 | Yes | No | |
| 1994 | Return to Two Moon Junction | May 11 | Yes | No | |
| 1994 | Trading Mom | May 13 | Yes | No | |
| 1994 | Freefall | May 25 | No | Yes | distribution only; produced by Nu Image |
| 1994 | Love Is a Gun | June 1 | No | Yes | |
| 1994 | Curse of the Starving Class | September 13 | No | Yes | |
| 1994 | Criminal Passion | September 21 | Yes | No | |
| 1994 | Running Free | October 5 | No | Yes | |
| 1994 | Frank and Jesse | October 28 | Yes | No | |
| 1994 | Dangerous Touch | November 2 | No | Yes | |
| 1994 | Hong Kong '97 | November 9 | No | Yes | |
| 1994 | Love and a .45 | November 23 | Yes | No | |
| 1994 | The Stoned Age | December 5 | Yes | No | |
| 1994 | Federal Hill | December 9 | Yes | No | |
| 1995 | Payback | January 10 | Yes | No | |
| 1995 | Night of the Running Man | January 19 | Yes | No | |
| 1995 | Swimming with Sharks | April 21 | Yes | No | |
| 1995 | Heatseeker | June 27 | Yes | No | |
| 1995 | Leprechaun 3 | June 27 | No | Yes | |
| 1995 | A Kid in King Arthur's Court | August 11 | Yes | No | co-produced by Walt Disney Pictures |
| 1995 | Separate Lives | September 8 | Yes | No | |
| 1995 | Kicking and Screaming | October 6 | Yes | No | |
| 1995 | The Doom Generation | October 25 | Yes | No | |
| 1996 | Evolver | February 10 | Yes | No | co-production with Blue Rider Pictures |
| 1996 | True Crime | March 12 | No | Yes | |
| 1996 | Two Guys Talkin' About Girls | June 18 | No | Yes | aka At First Sight |
| 1996 | Crimetime | August 4 | Yes | No | |
| 1996 | Sometimes They Come Back... Again | September 3 | No | Yes | |
| 1996 | Pinocchio's Revenge | October 7 | No | Yes | |
| 1996 | The Dentist | October 18 | No | Yes | |
| 1997 | Meet Wally Sparks | January 31 | Yes | No | |
| 1997 | Leprechaun 4: In Space | February 25 | No | Yes | |
| 1997 | Kama Sutra: A Tale of Love | February 28 | Yes | No | |
| 1997 | Frankenstein and Me | March 18 | No | Yes | |
| 1997 | Nothing Personal | April 25 | Yes | No | |
| 1997 | Ripe | May 2 | Yes | No | |
| 1997 | Sprung | May 16 | Yes | No | |
| 1997 | Box of Moonlight | July 25 | Yes | No | |
| 1997 | First Love, Last Rites | September 10 | Yes | No | |
| 1997 | Trucks | October 29 | No | Yes | |
| 1997 | Eve's Bayou | November 7 | Yes | No | Inducted into the National Film Registry in 2018 |
| 1998 | Star Kid | January 16 | Yes | No | |
| 1998 | The Curve | January 24 | Yes | No | |
| 1998 | Chairman of the Board | March 13 | Yes | No | |
| 1998 | Chinese Box | April 17 | Yes | No | |
| 1998 | Billy's Hollywood Screen Kiss | July 24 | Yes | No | |
| 1998 | A Kid in Aladdin's Palace | July 28 | No | Yes | |
| 1998 | Carnival of Souls | August 21 | Yes | No | limited release |
| 1998 | Phoenix | September 4 | Yes | No | distribution only; produced by Lakeshore Entertainment |
| 1998 | Cube | September 11 | Yes | No | |
| 1998 | Trance | September 18 | Yes | No | |
| 1998 | Slam | October 7 | Yes | No | |
| 1998 | The Landlady | November 10 | No | Yes | |
| 1998 | The Dentist 2 | December 11 | No | Yes | |
| 1998 | Hitman Hart: Wrestling with Shadows | December 20 | No | Yes | |
| 1998 | Another Day in Paradise | December 30 | Yes | No | |
| 1999 | King Cobra | April 27 | No | Yes | |
| 1999 | The Sex Monster | May 5 | Yes | No | |
| 1999 | The Simple Life of Noah Dearborn | May 9 | No | Yes | |
| 1999 | Twice Upon a Yesterday | May 28 | Yes | No | |
| 1999 | Diplomatic Siege | June 10 | No | Yes | |
| 1999 | Better Than Chocolate | August 13 | Yes | No | |
| 1999 | Sometimes They Come Back... for More | September 7 | No | Yes | |
| 1999 | The Delivery | September 16 | No | Yes | Dutch film; international distribution only; produced by Two Independent Film and Veronica |
| 1999 | Romance | September 17 | Yes | No | |
| 1999 | Atomic Train | September 21 | No | Yes | |
| 1999 | Warlock III: The End of Innocence | October 12 | No | Yes | |
| 1999 | Joe the King | October 15 | Yes | No | |
| 1999 | Tail Lights Fade | December 3 | Yes | No | |
| 1999 | Turbulence 2: Fear of Flying | December 27 | No | Yes | Simply known as Turbulence II. Currently distributed by Notorious Pictures in Italy |
| 2000 | Beautiful People | February 18 | Yes | No | |
| 2000 | Cut | March 2 | No | Yes | |
| 2000 | Leprechaun in the Hood | March 28 | No | Yes | |
| 2000 | The Last September | April 21 | Yes | No | |
| 2000 | Held Up | May 12 | Yes | No | |
| 2000 | Cord | May 23 | No | Yes | |
| 2000 | Flypaper | June 27 | No | Yes | |
| 2000 | Spy Games | July 11 | No | Yes | |
| 2000 | The Perfect Tenant | July 25 | No | Yes | |
| 2000 | Attraction | September 20 | No | Yes | |
| 2000 | Uninvited Guest | September 22 | No | Yes | |
| 2000 | The Bogus Witch Project | October 10 | No | Yes | |
| 2000 | Faust: Love of the Damned | October 12 | No | Yes | |
| 2000 | Shriek If You Know What I Did Last Friday the 13th | October 17 | No | Yes | |
| 2000 | After Alice | October 24 | No | Yes | |
| 2000 | The Stepdaughter | October 31 | No | Yes | |
| 2000 | What's Cooking? | November 17 | Yes | No | |
| 2000 | The St. Francisville Experiment | December 5 | No | Yes | |
| 2000 | South of Heaven, West of Hell | December 15 | Yes | No | |
| 2000 | XChange | December 20 | No | Yes | |
| 2001 | Skipped Parts | January 4 | Yes | No | |
| 2001 | Killer Bud | March 13 | No | Yes | |
| 2001 | After the Storm | March 20 | No | Yes | |
| 2001 | Turbulence 3: Heavy Metal | May 13 | No | Yes | |
| 2001 | Blood Surf | June 26 | No | Yes | |

== List of distributed video games ==
| Release date | Title | Platform | Notes |
|---|---|---|---|
| 1994 | National Lampoon's Blind Date | Windows, Mac OS | |
| November 23, 1994 | Air Havoc Controller | Windows | |
| 1995 | The Hive | Windows, PlayStation | |
| 1995 | White Men Can't Jump | Jaguar | |
| Cancelled | Warlock | Jaguar | |
