= Motocross Madness (1998 video game) =

- Developer: Rainbow Studios
- Publisher: Microsoft
- Designer: Robb Rinard
- Programmers: Mark DeSimone; Glenn O'Bannon
- Artists: Brian Gillies; Kevin Riley
- Composer: Mark Stratford
- Platform: Microsoft Windows
- Release: NA: August 18, 1998; EU: August 1998
- Genre: Racing
- Modes: Single-player, multiplayer

Motocross Madness is a motocross racing video game developed by Rainbow Studios and published by Microsoft.

A sequel, Motocross Madness 2, was released in 2000. In 2013, a sequel for Xbox 360 was released, titled Motocross Madness. In the game, one can earn money by utilizing "career mode", but play for fun in Baja, Stunts, Enduro, Supercross, and National levels as well.

== Gameplay ==
The player races on the Baja track Arizona Waypoint #1.

The game is known for its realism, including terrain, audio, and "bone-chilling" motorcycle wrecks. If the player is in Stunt mode and goes out of bounds after climbing a large cliff, an "invisible slingshot" will cause the player and the bike fly across the map while a funny sound plays until both objects hit the ground. The "invisible slingshot" effect was also used in the game ATV Offroad Fury, also created by Rainbow Studios.

== Development ==
The game went gold on July 24, 1998.

== Reception ==
Reception

Aggregate score
Aggregator	Score
GameRankings	87%

Review scores
Publication	Score
AllGame	4.5/5
CNET Gamecenter	7/10
Computer Games Strategy Plus	5/5
Computer Gaming World	4.5/5
Game Informer	8/10
GameSpot	8.4/10
IGN	8/10
PC Accelerator	7/10
PC Gamer (US)	92%
PC Zone	91%
The Cincinnati Enquirer	5/5

The game received favorable reviews according to the review aggregation website GameRankings.

=== Sales ===
The game sold 35,922 units during 1998. These sales accounted for $1.54 million in revenue that year.

=== Awards ===
The game won Computer Games Strategy Plus' 1998 "Racing Game of the Year" award. The staff hailed it as "perhaps the best motorcycle racing game of all time." PC Gamer US also named it the best racing game of 1998. During the 2nd Annual Interactive Achievement Awards, the Academy of Interactive Arts & Sciences named Motocross Madness as a finalist for "PC Sports Game of the Year" and "Outstanding Achievement in Software Engineering", both of which were ultimately awarded to FIFA 99 and The Legend of Zelda: Ocarina of Time, respectively. It also received a nomination for GameSpot's 1998 "Driving Game of the Year" award, which ultimately went to Need for Speed III: Hot Pursuit.
