= ATV Offroad Fury 2 =

2002 video game

- Developer: Rainbow Studios
- Publishers: NA: Sony Computer Entertainment; EU: THQ
- Series: ATV Offroad Fury
- Platform: PlayStation 2
- Release: NA: November 12, 2002; EU: October 3, 2003
- Genre: Racing
- Modes: Single-player, multiplayer

ATV Offroad Fury 2 is a racing video game developed by Rainbow Studios and published by Sony Computer Entertainment for the PlayStation 2. It is a sequel to ATV Offroad Fury, and is the first in the series to support online multiplayer, using both broadband and dial-up connection. It was released on November 12, 2002 in North America and on October 3, 2003 in Europe by THQ.

The game was succeeded by ATV Offroad Fury 3 in 2004.

== Gameplay ==
Expanding from its predecessor, ATV Offroad Fury 2 features more ATVs (including Ravage Talons), along with more vehicles, mini-games, championships, and others. The ATVs do not suffer damage, but their occupants are vulnerable to dismounts from ATVs, if the vehicle lands poorly or another racer lands on the player. Also, after riding for an extended period of time, the ATVs will become dirty. They can be cleaned by resetting or driving into water, but if the player stays in deep water for more than 5 seconds, they are teleported out of the water. If the player drives out of bounds, they will dismount from their ATV and fly through the air. The game also features new point-earning tricks, as well as championships where players can earn profile points for each race completed. Completing championships will unlock a new event, such as Freestyle events, which the players must complete within the time limit. The game also offers minigames.

ATV Offroad Fury 2 is also the first installment in the series to offer online play, which allows players to challenge other players over an online network (including a set of Lobbies), connected via i-Link, local area network (LAN) or other network connections.

The stunts featured in ATV Offroad Fury 2 are typically activated by tapping a combination of buttons while the player's ATV is in the air, to activate stunt-based combo moves. Each set of tricks also requires a different amount of time to perform.

== Reception ==
Reception

Aggregate score
Aggregator	Score
Metacritic	82/100

Review scores
Publication	Score
Electronic Gaming Monthly	8.5/10, 7.5/10, 7/10
Game Informer	9/10
GamePro	5/5
GameRevolution	B
GameSpot	7/10
GameSpy	2/5
GameZone	9.2/10
IGN	9/10
Official U.S. PlayStation Magazine	4/5
X-Play	4/5

ATV Offroad Fury 2 received "generally favorable" reviews, according to review aggregator website Metacritic.

IGN gave the game 9 out of 10, praising the gameplay, but criticizing the soundtrack. GameSpot gave the game 7 out of 10, noting the lack of changes from the previous game.

ATV Offroad Fury 2 received a nomination for "Console Racing Game of the Year" at the AIAS' 6th Annual Interactive Achievement Awards, but lost to Need for Speed: Hot Pursuit 2.
