= Deadly Creatures =

2009 video game

- Developer: Rainbow Studios
- Publisher: THQ
- Designer: Jordan Itkowitz
- Platform: Wii
- Release: NA: February 9, 2009; AU: February 12, 2009; EU: February 13, 2009
- Genre: Action
- Mode: Single-player

Deadly Creatures is an action video game for the Wii released in February 2009. It was developed by Rainbow Studios and published by THQ. The game allows players to play as a tarantula and a scorpion, engaging in combat against other creatures.

== Gameplay ==
Players can control a young male scorpion and an adult female tarantula and engage in brutal battles against other arachnids, insects, rats, and reptiles.

The two creatures have different playing styles, with the scorpion's levels featuring more action-oriented gameplay, while the tarantula is more stealth-oriented, with less linear levels. The Wii Remote and Nunchuk are used for both movement and attacks, with motion controls incorporated for special attacks and finishing moves, while the tarantula also utilizes the pointer function to shoot webs. New abilities are also gained as the player progresses through the game.

Along with dispatching common arthropods such as pill bugs, crickets, beetles, and wolf spiders, most of which can be devoured to regain health, the player also faces bosses including a Gila Monster, a rattlesnake and eventually a human. The clashes between the creatures are described as similar to monster movies, with a similar impact to battles in King Kong and Jurassic Park albeit on a smaller scale.

== Plot ==
Two men, George Struggs and Wade (voiced by Dennis Hopper and Billy Bob Thornton), are looking for a location in the Sonoran Desert where they believe gold from the American Civil War has been buried. The story is told from the point of view of both a tarantula and a scorpion with both creatures often seeing the same thing but from a different perspective, both also being stalked by a rattlesnake that the tarantula battled in the first level, as well as continuously fighting each other. When Struggs and Wade finally find the gold, Struggs turns on Wade, knocking him out with a shovel and taking the gold for himself. On his way back to his gas station, he finds the tarantula and rattlesnake and keeps them in glass tanks; the tarantula is able to climb out of the tank, with the rattlesnake escaping as well. Meanwhile, the scorpion finds its way into Struggs' gas station and "battles" him by repeatedly stinging his crotch. Outside, the tarantula is attacked by the rattlesnake and the two fight on one of the station's gas tanks. Struggs chases the scorpion outside and is startled by the rattlesnake. Both the tarantula and scorpion are able to flee, and Struggs shoots at the rattlesnake and hits one of the gas lines, causing the gas tank to explode, presumably killing the rattlesnake. Wade's narration at the beginning of the game implies that Struggs survived, having slipped into a coma due to the explosion and being bitten by a Gila Monster during his battle with the scorpion. The scorpion and the tarantula manage to escape the explosion and meet each other once again, but instead of fighting this time, they decide to simply leave each other alone. The game ends with a final shot of a piece of the Spanish gold rolling toward the screen and landing on the ground.

== Development ==
The game's concept was inspired when lead designer Jordan Itkowitz had a dream about using the Wii Remote to control a snake, slithering through the grass and striking a mouse. In brainstorming, the idea of the snake and other creatures were left on the cutting room floor, leaving the scorpion and tarantula.

For promotion, Rainbow Studios released a fake "behind-the-scenes" video dated from January 2008 revealing a motion capturing session involving a scorpion. However, the video shows a computer generated creature from the game itself with motion capturing dots on its body doing tasks.

== Reception ==
Reception

Aggregate score
Aggregator	Score
Metacritic	72/100

Review scores
Publication	Score
Edge	5/10
Eurogamer	4/10
Game Informer	7/10
GameSpot	7.5/10
GameSpy	4.5/5
GameTrailers	7.3/10
GameZone	8.6/10
IGN	8/10
Nintendo Power	7.5/10
X-Play	3/5
411Mania	7.8/10

Deadly Creatures received an "average" review of 72 out of 100 according to the review aggregation website Metacritic.

Video game and entertainment news website IGN reviewed Deadly Creatures as "Great" with an eight out of 10 score.

Nordic Games, now referred to as THQ Nordic, acquired "substantially all" of THQ's remaining intellectual property in April 2013, and has cited interest in re-releasing Deadly Creatures on modern platforms, pending acquisition of the game's source code from the original developers.
