= MX vs. ATV Reflex =

2009 video game

- Developers: Rainbow Studios; Tantalus Media (handhelds)
- Publisher: THQ
- Series: MX vs. ATV
- Platforms: Nintendo DS, PlayStation 3, PlayStation Portable, Xbox 360, Microsoft Windows
- Release: NA: December 1, 2009; AU: December 17, 2009; EU: February 5, 2010; Microsoft Windows: WW: November 26, 2010
- Genre: Racing
- Modes: Single-player, multiplayer

MX vs. ATV Reflex is a 2009 off-road racing video game developed by Rainbow Studios and published by THQ. It is the third game in the MX vs. ATV series, available on Microsoft Windows and all seventh-generation consoles except the Wii. It is also the last game in the series to be available on handheld consoles.

The Microsoft Windows and home console version received generally favorable reviews from critics for most of its gameplay, innovative "Rider Reflex" controls and realistic terrain deformation, but its occasionally chaotic nature (deemed unforgiving towards more casual players), career mode and graphics were criticized. It is often considered to be the best game in the series by fans. Reception for the handheld console versions, however, was generally unfavorable.

== Gameplay ==
The core focus of the game allows for the player to race motocross and supercross on motocross bikes or ATVs. The game also includes events such as omnicross, free ride, champion sport track, waypoint racing, and freestyle motocross.

Although the game is part of the MX vs. ATV series, Reflex was built from the ground up featuring a new control scheme and physics engine. The new control scheme is labeled "reflex" which utilizes both analog sticks. The left analog controls the handlebars while the right analog stick controls the rider's body movement. The reflex system allows for unprecedented control and manipulation by allowing the player to 'ride' the motorcycle and other vehicles as they actually would. Tricks have been simplified from the previous games as the player only needs to hold the modifier button and use the right stick to make different combinations and flips. Certain potential wipeout situations may also present the player an opportunity to pass a quick-time event to actually avoid such wipeout via a "wreck avoidance" system.

Also new to Reflex is real-time terrain deformation. Terrain deformation allows any of the different vehicles to dynamically alter the racing terrain, carving ruts, berms, braking bumps and acceleration bumps into the ground as seen in actual off-road racing.

Online mode on consoles and PC consists of public and private rooms. These rooms are dedicated to specific event types (i.e. supercross) and host up to twelve players at a single time. A player's "motocard" keeps record of the player's progress through online events which earns them experience points that go towards the player's level. Mini games such as snake and tag are played online as well. The console and PC versions also support offline, 2-player split screen multiplayer, while the Nintendo DS version also supports local wireless multiplayer between up to four players.

== Development ==
Rainbow Studios art director Ian Wood said in an interview with SPOnG that the development team decided against making a Wii version of Reflex, but did not provide a clear reason why. He hinted that the developers chose to skip it to focus efforts on designing Reflex's new physics and terrain deforming system, key features that were better suited for the more powerful PlayStation 3, Xbox 360 and personal computers. Tantalus Media, which developed the handheld versions of the previous game, MX vs. ATV Untamed, was invited once again to develop handheld versions for Reflex. This would be the last time in the series that Rainbow Studios would allow another company to collaborate on a MX vs. ATV game. Starting with MX vs. ATV Alive, subsequent sequels would be developed singlehandedly by Rainbow Studios.

== Reception ==
Reception

Aggregate score
| Aggregator | Score | | | |
| Aggregator | DS | PS3 | PSP | Xbox 360 |
|---|---|---|---|---|
| Metacritic | 48/100 | 74/100 | 49/100 | 75/100 |

Review scores
| Publication | Score | | | |
| Publication | DS | PS3 | PSP | Xbox 360 |
|---|---|---|---|---|
| 1Up.com | N/A | B | N/A | B |
| Game Informer | N/A | 7.5/10 | N/A | 7.5/10 |
| GameRevolution | N/A | C+ | N/A | C+ |
| GameSpot | N/A | 6.5/10 | N/A | 7/10 |
| GameTrailers | N/A | 6.8/10 | N/A | N/A |
| GameZone | N/A | 8/10 | N/A | 8/10 |
| IGN | 5.7/10 | 7.8/10 | 4/10 | 7.8/10 |
| Official Xbox Magazine (US) | N/A | N/A | N/A | 6/10 |
| PlayStation: The Official Magazine | N/A | 3.5/5 | N/A | N/A |
| VideoGamer.com | N/A | 6/10 | N/A | 6/10 |
| Teletext GameCentral | N/A | N/A | N/A | 6/10 |

The Xbox 360 version received "generally favorable reviews", while the PlayStation 3 version received "average" reviews, just one point shy of "favorable", according to the review aggregation website Metacritic. A large portion of praise had gone towards both the new control scheme as well as the terrain deformation. Many acknowledged the game's successful separation of the rider from the machine with the rider reflex dual-analog control.

Dakota Grabowski of GameZone said: "A wonderful foundation has been set and it's now time for Rainbow Studios to expand on what they have set up with their next iterations. The future is bright and fans should be rejoicing". Austin Light of GameSpot said of the PS3 and X360 versions: "Unfortunately, things don't always work correctly in MX vs. ATV Reflex. Kinks in the physics system can lead to some unpredictable, chaotic rides". Light also said that "Reflex is not a particularly good looking game on either system, with blurry, low-res textures that are distracting in the open world tracks". IT Reviews acknowledged that "MX vs ATV isn't about pelting around with the throttle constantly revving to the max, rather the successful rider gets into the rhythm of the jumps. This is novel, and feels realistic". However, the reviewer complained about aspects of the single player game, including CPU riders who are "borderline psychopathic", truck driving that is "far too easily mastered" and a campaign mode which is "rather unimaginative and flat" on an overall level.

By contrast, the handheld versions received "generally unfavorable reviews" according to Metacritic. Chris Roper of IGN criticized the controls and presentation.
