= WWE Crush Hour =

2003 video game

- North American cover art with The Rock and Rob Van Dam
- Developer: Pacific Coast Power & Light
- Publisher: THQ
- Producer: David Gray
- Designers: Cormac Russell; Steve Yoshimura
- Programmer: Mike McAulay
- Artist: Dane Shears
- Engine: RenderWare
- Platforms: PlayStation 2, GameCube
- Release: NA: March 18, 2003; PAL: May 15, 2003
- Genres: Vehicular combat, racing
- Modes: Single-player, multiplayer

WWE Crush Hour is a vehicular combat video game developed by Pacific Coast Power & Light and published by THQ. It was released for the GameCube and PlayStation 2 on March 18, 2003, in North America, and on May 15, 2003, in PAL regions. An Xbox version was in development before being cancelled.

== Plot ==
WWE Crush Hour features Vince McMahon taking control over every television network, with WWE professional wrestling superstars appearing on every television show and commercial. His newest project, titled "Crush Hour", is a demolition derby-style show featuring more than thirty WWE superstars in custom cars, outfitted with mounted guns (Primary Weapon), and foreign objects (Optional Weapon) to enhance the destruction of the opponent's vehicles, and a "Special Move" which will inflict significantly more damage than the other aforementioned weapons. WWE Crush Hour also features audio commentary by Jim Ross.

== Development ==
WWE Crush Hour was officially announced in May 2002 by JAKKS Pacific and THQ. It was released on March 17, 2003, in North America, and on May 15 in Europe. The game was a budget title, and retailed for much less than other licensed games.

== Reception ==
Reception

Aggregate score
Aggregator	Score	
Aggregator	GameCube	PS2
Metacritic	55/100	56/100

Review scores
Publication	Score	
Publication	GameCube	PS2
Electronic Gaming Monthly	3.17/10	N/A
Eurogamer	3/10	N/A
Game Informer	4/10	5.25/10
GamePro	3.5/5	N/A
GameSpot	5.7/10	5.7/10
GameSpy	2/5	2/5
GameZone	6.9/10	6/10
IGN	6.5/10	6.2/10
Nintendo Power	2.4/5	N/A
Official U.S. PlayStation Magazine	N/A	2.5/5
Maxim	4/10	4/10
The Village Voice	5/10	N/A

The game received "mixed or average" reviews, according to review aggregator Metacritic.

== See also ==
- List of licensed wrestling video games
- List of vehicular combat games
