= Air Havoc Controller =

1994 video game

- Developer: Rainbow Studios
- Publisher: Trimark Interactive
- Platform: Windows
- Release: November 23, 1994

Air Havoc Controller is a 1994 video game from Trimark Interactive.

== Gameplay ==
Air Havoc Controller is a high-pressure air traffic control simulation set in a 30-mile stretch of Arizona airspace, encompassing Phoenix, Deer Valley, and Scottsdale airports. Players take on the role of an air traffic controller, managing aircraft that are taking off, landing, or passing through the zone. The core challenge lies in preventing mid-air collisions and ensuring smooth traffic flow, especially when multiple planes with varying flight plans, speeds, and altitudes converge. Gameplay intensifies as the number of planes increases, requiring players to carefully align them to safely sequence aircraft. The game features several difficulty levels, with the most intense mode, "Terror in the Tower", challenging the player with 50 planes in just 45 minutes. Custom scenarios can push that number to 99 planes over 90 minutes. Air Havoc Controller boasts 256-color visuals, 3D Studio-rendered animations, and digitized stereo sound. Players are rewarded with cinematic sequences for successful landings — and dramatic crash visuals when things go wrong. A built-in VCR feature allows replaying these moments.

== Development ==
Air Havoc Controller was published by Trimark Interactive, a company founded in March 1993.

== Reception ==
Reception

Review scores
Publication	Score
Computer Gaming World	3.5/5
PC Gamer	75%
Power Play	57%
PC Player	59%
PC Joker	73%

Computer Gaming World gave Air Havoc Controller a score of 3.5 out of 5, stating, "Provided you're not training to pass an FAA controller exam, but simply want some high-tension challenges steering some heavy metal through crowded skies, Air Havoc Controller is a game you'll want to play."
