= Jet Moto 3 =

1999 video game

- Developer: Pacific Coast Power & Light
- Publisher: 989 Studios
- Producer: Don Traeger
- Programmers: Ming Lee; Matthew Gaston; Dennis Harper
- Composers: Steve Stevens, Ben Watkins, Chuck Doud, Juno Reactor
- Series: Jet Moto
- Platform: PlayStation
- Release: NA: August 30, 1999
- Genre: Racing
- Modes: Single-player, multiplayer

Jet Moto 3 is a 1999 racing video game developed by Pacific Coast Power & Light and published by 989 Studios for the PlayStation. It is the third and most recent installment of the Jet Moto series and the only installment to not be published directly by Sony Computer Entertainment. It was released only in North America. It was released on the PlayStation Network on February 21, 2008 but was removed shortly thereafter for undisclosed reasons.

The game received moderately positive reviews. Reviewers generally praised the game's visuals, considering them an improvement over the previous installments. Jet Moto 3 is the last title to date in the Jet Moto series. Two additional sequels, Jet Moto 2124 and Jet Moto: SOLAR, were cancelled during development.

== Gameplay ==
Weather effects, along with other graphical improvements were included in Jet Moto 3.

Gameplay in Jet Moto 3 differs from that of a traditional racing game with cars or motorcycles. Players instead control hoverbikes which sit close to the ground and can be ridden over land and water. Most of the courses in the game are designed to take advantage of this ability. Characters are split into teams, and bikes are adorned with logos of products such as Mountain Dew and Doritos, similar to real-life sponsored racing.

Ten characters are available from the beginning of the game with two more unlockable. This Jet Moto is notable for the inclusion of new stunt tracks. The objective of these tracks is to perform stunts to gain higher points and to collect coins scattered throughout the track. Another notable inclusion is the "hop" button, which is used to boost your player above the ground to avoid obstacles.

The physics of the jet moto bikes were also changed, with the bikes reaching much higher speed than the two previous games. Weather was also introduced into the series, with jet moto riders racing in the rain and in other weathered environments. Track themes vary greatly, with tracks taking places in volcanic islands, catacombs, the heights of Machu Picchu, and a thick Sequoia forest.

== Development ==
Jet Moto 3 would be the first and only released Jet Moto title by developer Pacific Coast Power & Light and publisher 989 Studios. SingleTrac had been purchased by GT Interactive, and the original developers had no interest in doing a third Jet Moto title. According to former 989 Sports president Kelly Flock, Pacific Coast Power & Light was "nearby and cheap" and was headed by Don Traeger, who had formerly worked on the Road Rash series, so the decision was made to use that studio for development.

Unlike its predecessor, the game supported the DualShock Controller. The previous game only supported the Dual Analog controller with Rumble feedback. The Jet Moto 3 graphics engine and developer toolkit were built from the ground up by lead programmer Ming Lee. Lee was challenged to increase the framerate and graphic quality of the game. To do so he decomposed the opcodes of the PlayStation's graphics processor and rewrote some of the PlayStation's library calls. This in essence allowed Lee to access the PlayStation hardware as he saw fit, allowing him to optimize his code specifically to his hardware calls. In doing so, however, the developers broke compatibility with first generation PlayStation consoles, something that was not caught until after the game was released. Fellow programmer Matt Gaston focused his energies on AI, physics and user interface programming.

With programming optimizations in place, developers were able to use the additional power to add weather effects previously unheard of. Lee noted in an interview with PlayStation Museum that rain particles "actually streak in 3D according to your camera speed", noting that other games used a 2D effect on the game's HUD to produce the effect of rain. Colored fog was also shown in one level, something that the PlayStation console could not do natively, and had only previously been seen in one game, Spyro the Dragon. Real time lighting was also added to the game. Jet Moto 3 would also use CGI cutscenes for the game's introduction, a first for the Jet Moto series.

== Reception ==
Reception

Aggregate score
Aggregator	Score
GameRankings	76%

Review scores
Publication	Score
AllGame	3/5
CNET Gamecenter	7/10
Electronic Gaming Monthly	4.625/10 (Note: Two critics of Electronic Gaming Monthly gave the game each a score of 4/10, one gave it 6/10, and the other gave it 4.5/10.)
EP Daily	8/10
Game Informer	7/10
GameRevolution	A−
GameSpot	7.5/10
IGN	8.6/10
Next Generation	4/5
Official U.S. PlayStation Magazine	3.5/5

Jet Moto 3 received favorable reviews according to the review aggregation website GameRankings.

Reviewers were mixed on the opinion of the game's visuals. Sean Johnson of GameRevolution called the graphics "a vast improvement over the grainy, somewhat choppy visuals of Jet Moto and Jet Moto 2." Jay Boor of IGN also praised the game's visuals, citing a vastly improved framerate and draw distance than Jet Moto and Jet Moto 2. Ben Stahl of GameSpot, on the contrary, felt the graphical details were poor, citing that the game's environments were "nice and pretty unless you get too close." The CGI cutscenes were also panned by Stahl, calling it "frightful" and stating "none of the characters look even fractionally human."

Game Informer praised the new stunt tracks, stating that they "will capture hours of your playtime." Victor Lucas of The Electric Playground spoke highly of the game's soundtrack, stating that the varied types of music fit each track's location and environment. He further praised Jet Moto 3 as superior to the other titles, calling the first two games "notoriously bug-ridden". Doug Trueman of NextGen said, "In a season with relatively few worthwhile PlayStation racing games, Jet Moto 3 proves to be fast, furious racing fun." Boba Fatt of GamePro said, "Even with more depth and funk than its predecessors, Jet Moto 3 falls short of speederbike nirvana. Luckily, its cool features and devious level design will snap you back like magnetic grapplings. Yeow!" (Note: GamePro gave the game three 4/5 scores for graphics, sound, and control, and 4.5/5 for fun factor.)

The game ranked tenth in the top ten racing titles for June 2000 according to the NPD Group; however, sales did not continue to hold strong.

== Legacy ==
Jet Moto 3 would be the last game in the series to be released. 989 Studios and Pacific Coast Power & Light were working on a fourth Jet Moto title, dubbed Jet Moto 2124, for the PlayStation, but the game was cancelled when Jet Moto 3 showed poor sales. Jet Moto 2124 was to be set over a century after the first three games. Jet Moto: SOLAR, developed by RedZone Interactive, was also cancelled. SOLAR would have been the first title in the series to appear on the PlayStation 2.
