= The Hive (video game) =

1995 video game

- Developer: Rainbow Studios
- Publisher: Trimark Interactive
- Platforms: Windows, PlayStation
- Release: Windows: NA: November 6, 1995; PlayStation: NA: 27 July 1996
- Genre: Rail shooter
- Mode: Single-player

The Hive is a video game developed by Rainbow Studios and published by Trimark Interactive for Microsoft Windows and PlayStation. It was one of the first Windows 95 games to have been released for the platform.

== Story ==
Several millennia ago, the Ancients created a mutant strain of genetically engineered Hivasects to produce a deadly bio-toxin. In an accident of cosmic proportions, the toxin turned out to be so lethal that it erased the Ancients from existence. Since the recent discovery of the now extinct Ancients civilization, the entire solar system has been under quarantine by the Federation, for fear that the toxin would spread. The Black Nexus Mob, masquerading as the Noir Dyne Corporation and controlled by Chairman Helms, revived these Hivasects from an archived DNA sample of a Hivasect Queen. Noir Dyne created an operational Hive with the capability to produce enough bio-toxin to threaten the Galaxy.

The player character and protagonist of the game is Max, a Federation Agent ordered by Federation Commodore Adrian to infiltrate the Noir Dyne ranks disguised as a cargo runner. Just outside the Ice Planet, he joins with the Noir Dyne vessel, STX Darkstar, in order to retrieve a bio-toxin sample and return it to the Federation for further study. However, his cover is blown and the shipment received is a bomb. Having been warned of the trap by his Federation liaison Agent Ginger Malloy, Max aborts the mission, but now the chase is on. With the help of Ginger's brief data bursts, Max must battle his way through enemy fighters, ground troops, robot weapons, and deadly alien Hivasects to destroy the Hive and save the galaxy.

== Reception ==
A reviewer for Next Generation opined that the game has "stunning" graphics, but a plot which "sounds like something taken from a second-rate sci-fi novel" and repetitive, minimally interactive rail shooter gameplay. He gave it two out of five stars.

Scary Larry of GamePro panned the PlayStation version. Though he found the chief problem to be the fact that the aiming cursor moves too slowly to keep up with the enemy ships, he also criticized the poorly compressed graphics, dull gameplay, and annoying onboard computer voice, and concluded that "Fans of the PC game may wonder why this version was even released."

The game shipped more than 120,000 copies.
