= Championship Motocross 2001 Featuring Ricky Carmichael =

2000 video game

- Developers: Tiertex Design Studios (GBC); Funcom Dublin (PS)
- Publisher: THQ
- Platforms: Game Boy Color, PlayStation
- Release: Game Boy Color: NA: October 2000; EU: November 24, 2000; PlayStation: NA: January 31, 2001; EU: April 6, 2001
- Genres: Sports, racing
- Modes: Single-player, multiplayer

Championship Motocross 2001 Featuring Ricky Carmichael is a video game developed by Tiertex Design Studios and Funcom Dublin and published by THQ for Game Boy Color and PlayStation. It is the second motocross racing game published by THQ to be endorsed by professional motocross racer Ricky Carmichael, after Championship Motocross featuring Ricky Carmichael.

== Reception ==
Reception

Aggregate scores
Aggregator	Score	
Aggregator	GBC	PS
GameRankings	61%	70%
Metacritic	N/A	70/100

Review scores
Publication	Score	
Publication	GBC	PS
4Players	N/A	77%
AllGame	2/5	2.5/5
Electronic Gaming Monthly	N/A	6.67/10
Game Informer	N/A	6.5/10
GameSpot	N/A	7.5/10
GameZone	N/A	6.5/10
IGN	5/10	6.4/10
Official U.S. PlayStation Magazine	N/A	3/5

The PlayStation version received above-average reviews according to the review aggregation website Metacritic.
