= MX 2002 featuring Ricky Carmichael =

2001 video game

- North American PlayStation 2 cover art of Ricky Carmichael (foreground)
- Developers: Pacific Coast Power & Light; Tiertex Design Studios (GBA)
- Publisher: THQ
- Programmer: Matthew Gaston
- Composer: Steve Kirk
- Series: MX
- Engine: RenderWare (consoles)
- Platforms: PlayStation 2 Xbox; Game Boy Advance
- Release: PlayStation 2: NA: June 28, 2001; EU: September 14, 2001; Game Boy Advance: NA: September 25, 2001; EU: October 26, 2001; Xbox: NA: December 3, 2001; EU: April 26, 2002
- Genres: Sports, racing
- Modes: Single-player, multiplayer

MX 2002 featuring Ricky Carmichael is a video game developed by Pacific Coast Power & Light and published by THQ for the PlayStation 2, Xbox and Game Boy Advance in 2001. It is the third motocross racing game published by THQ to be endorsed by professional motocross racer Ricky Carmichael, after Championship Motocross featuring Ricky Carmichael and its sequel, Championship Motocross 2001 Featuring Ricky Carmichael, as well as the first game in THQ's MX trilogy, a follow-up series to the Championship Motocross duology that would eventually become part of its MX vs. ATV crossover racing franchise. A sequel, MX Superfly, was released in 2002 and also endorsed by Carmichael.

== Development ==
MX 2002 originally began development as a sequel to Championship Motocross 2001 Featuring Ricky Carmichael, before undergoing significant changes that led it to be rebranded as the start of a new successor to the Championship Motocross duology. Tiertex Studios, which developed the Game Boy Color version of Championship Motocross 2001, developed a Game Boy Advance version of MX 2002 that similarly featured 3-D graphics.

== Reception ==
Reception

Aggregate scores
Aggregator	Score	
Aggregator	PS2	Xbox
GameRankings	78%	71%
Metacritic	76/100	74/100

Review scores
Publication	Score	
Publication	PS2	Xbox
Electronic Gaming Monthly	7.33/10 (Note: In Electronic Gaming Monthly's review of the PlayStation 2 version, one critic gave it 7/10, and the rest gave it each a score of 7.5/10.)	N/A
EP Daily	8.5/10	8/10
Game Informer	7/10	7.5/10
GameSpot	7.6/10	7.1/10
GameSpy	76%	73%
GameZone	8.3/10	9/10
IGN	8.3/10	7.5/10
Next Generation	4/5	3/5
Official U.S. PlayStation Magazine	4/5	N/A
Official Xbox Magazine (US)	N/A	6.5/10
The Cincinnati Enquirer	4/5	N/A
Playboy	85%	N/A

The PlayStation 2 version received "generally favorable reviews", while the Xbox version received "mixed or average reviews", according to the review aggregation website Metacritic. While Jim Preston of NextGen was critical about the game having "ordinary" graphics and an "awkward" stunt system for the PS2 version, the magazine was more positive to the Xbox version due to its better controls and built-in tutorials. Dan Elektro of GamePro said that the former console version "may find its true niche with big motocross fans, but casual gamers will most likely be left in the dust." (Note: GamePro gave the PlayStation 2 version two 4/5 scores for graphics and control, 3.5/5 for sound, and 3/5 for fun factor.)

Reception
GBA

Aggregate score
Aggregator	Score
GameRankings	42%

Review scores
Publication	Score
IGN	5/10
Nintendo Power	2/5
