= Wave Race: Blue Storm =

2001 video game

- North American box art
- Developer: Nintendo Software Technology
- Publisher: Nintendo
- Director: Shigeki Yamashiro
- Producers: Minoru Arakawa; Shigeru Miyamoto; Shigeki Yamashiro
- Designers: Richard Vorodi; Bill Giese; Marc Doyal; Steve Bolender
- Artist: Raymond Yan
- Composers: Lawrence Schwedler; James Phillipsen
- Series: Wave Race
- Platform: GameCube
- Release: JP: September 14, 2001; NA: November 18, 2001; EU: May 3, 2002; AU: May 17, 2002
- Genre: Racing
- Modes: Single-player, multiplayer

Wave Race: Blue Storm (Note: Japanese: ウェーブレース ブルーストーム, Hepburn: Uēbu Rēsu Burū Sutōmu) is a jetski racing video game developed and published by Nintendo for the GameCube in late 2001. It is the sequel to the 1996 Nintendo 64 game Wave Race 64, and the third in the series that started with the 1992 Game Boy game Wave Race.

== Gameplay ==
=== Championship mode ===
Players begin by selecting a character to use for the entire championship. Following this, the player is shown the courses on which they can race and a weather forecast for each day of the circuit. The more difficult the circuit, the more races (and thus days) the player must complete. Players can select the order in which they wish to race the courses. This decision can be affected by aforementioned forecast. If players find a certain course to be more difficult when it is raining, they can elect to play that course on a day which is forecast to be sunny.

After the selection of a course, gameplay begins. Players begin in a field of eight racers. Position at the beginning of a race is determined by your finish in the previous race, e.g. a player finishing third in one race will begin in the third position before the starting line of the following race. In the first race, players begin in eighth. As the player waits for the race to begin, a stoplight changes from red to yellow to green, indicating the start of the race. For pressing the accelerator exactly as the light turns green, the player will receive a turbo, which can be activated at the player's whim and which significantly boosts the speed of the player's craft for a short time.

The player then begins to navigate the course. In every course, buoys are set up in two colors: red and yellow. Red buoys are supposed to be passed on the right; yellow buoys on the left. Passing buoys correctly builds up the player's turbo meter. Other than the method mentioned above, which only works at the very beginning of a race, turbos can only be acquired by correctly navigating five of these buoys or by performing a stunt. Each stunt, unlike each buoy, fills from one-fifth to three-fifths of the meter depending on the stunt. Incorrectly passing a buoy results in the loss of any built-up turbo stages. This leads to some degree of strategy. For example, a player might build up a turbo, then use it to cut off a buoy placed in an awkward manner, or one off a distance to the side, thus eliminating much of the time that would have been used to get to and correctly pass that buoy.

There are other, smaller red buoys which mark the boundaries of each course. Staying outside of them for too long results in a disqualification.

During the race, the player is often bombarded (depending on weather conditions) with waves and rain which can force an inexperienced player off-course, or into obstacles or other riders. Successful navigation of these waves is essential. This is where the game's uniqueness in the genre comes to light. Waves are completely random and are affected by the weather, making for a different experience from that of most other games in the racing genre, such as the PlayStation 2's Splashdown. Every race consists of three laps. Often during a race, shortcuts will be revealed as the player passes each lap. Spotting these shortcuts as they appear can be essential to victory.

At the end of each race, the player is awarded points proportional to the place in which they finished. A player needs a certain point total at the end of each race in order to advance to the next day. If this total is not reached, the player must begin the circuit again.

Victory comes when the player finishes first, second, or third overall in total points at the end of the circuit. For the expert circuit, the player must finish first for all weather conditions in time attack mode.

=== Other modes ===
- Time Attack: The player selects an unlocked course and races alone. The object is not to win, but rather to finish in as fast a time as possible.
- Stunt Mode: The goal of this mode is to achieve high scores by performing stunts that are performed by executing certain button combinations. Stunts can also be executed in any other mode, and can be used to build up one's turbo meter.
- Multiplayer: For up to four players. Championship Mode and Stunt Mode may be played in this fashion.
- Free Roam: Allows the player to roam freely through any unlocked course, with no time limit or other racers.

=== Characters ===
There are eight playable characters in Blue Storm, including three returning characters from the previous game, two newcomers, and three originally introduced in 1080° Snowboarding. Each character is rated on a scale of 1–6 in five different categories which affect that character's performance, with six being the best. Each character also has his or her own crew chief, which is nothing more than a voice offering encouragement and advice to the player:

- Ryota Hayami (age: 23 from Japan) is the most balanced character, good for beginners and experts alike. Ryota Hayami is also a returning character from Wave Race 64. Akari Hayami is his younger sister.
- David Mariner (age: 37 from the USA) has high top speed and a strong grip, but is very difficult to maneuver and has slow acceleration. He is best for experienced players. He is also a returning character from Wave Race 64
- Akari Hayami (age: 21 from Japan) has a low top speed and a weak grip, but high acceleration and maneuvering, making her recommended for beginners. She was not originally from Wave Race 64, but rather from 1080° Snowboarding. Ryota Hayami is her older brother.
- Nigel Carver (age: 28 from Great Britain) is one of the heavier character, but he is easy enough to control.
- Ayumi Stewart (age: 26 from the USA) is a fairly balanced character, good for beginners to experts. She is also a returning character from Wave Race 64.
- Rob Haywood (age: 24 from the USA) is a heavy character, similar to David Mariner in terms of strengths and weaknesses, best for the more experienced players. He was originally from 1080° Snowboarding.
- Ricky Winterborn (age: 18 from Canada) is similar to Akari Hayami, but more stunt-oriented. He was originally from 1080° Snowboarding.
- Serena Del Mar (age: 19 from Brazil) is not particularly heavy, but she is challenging enough to control and is more directed towards advanced players.

== Reception ==
Reception

Aggregate score
Aggregator	Score
Metacritic	80/100

Review scores
Publication	Score
AllGame	3.5/5
Edge	7/10
Electronic Gaming Monthly	6.5/10
Eurogamer	8/10
Famitsu	8/10, 9/10, 8/10, 7/10
Game Informer	8.5/10
GamePro	4/5
GameRevolution	B−
GameSpot	8.5/10
GameSpy	80%
IGN	9.2/10
Nintendo Life	7/10
Nintendo Power	3.5/5

Blue Storm received "favorable" reviews according to the review aggregation website Metacritic. The game was praised for its water effects, weather effects, and physics. The weather effects in the game, most people agreed, were outstanding. They caused wave height to vary and often came on slowly, or would let up surprisingly in the middle of a race. The weather also affected course layout, adding to the game's variety. Physics in the game were unmatched by any other water-based game at the time. Waves that varied in height and intensity, wakes from other riders and more all attributed to the overall feel of the game and was usually mentioned as one of the games positives.

Most negative criticism centered around a few factors: difficulty, graphics, and similarity to Wave Race 64. The difficulty of the game was mostly due to the controls, which were more twitchy and required a delicate touch on the control stick and proper use of the GameCube controller's L and R buttons. The control system in Wave Race 64, by contrast, was slower and smoother and as a result, less demanding. Graphically, the game was flagged for having decidedly low poly visuals, with uninspired art and character design. Some of Wave Race: Blue Storm's courses were criticized for being copies or re-designs of courses from Wave Race 64, and as such, the game felt overly-familiar. In Japan, Famitsu gave it a score of one eight, one nine, one eight, and one seven.

Blue Storm sold 62,003 units in Japan, and was the third best selling launch title for the GameCube in North America, behind Luigi's Mansion and Star Wars Rogue Squadron II: Rogue Leader.

The game won the award for "Best In-Game Water" at GameSpot's Best and Worst of 2001 Awards, and was nominated for the "Best Driving Game" award, which went to Gran Turismo 3: A-Spec.

== Canceled sequel ==
In 2009, Nintendo Software Technology pitched a Wave Race game for the Wii. Early ideas for the game included holding the Wii Remote sideways to mimic the jet ski handlebars and using the Wii Balance Board to tilt the vehicle. While an early demo reportedly garnered "considerable interest" from Nintendo, concerns with the motion controls led to the project being turned down.

== Future ==
In April 2018, series producer Shinya Takahashi teased a revival of the series at the BAFTA Games Awards, stating, "You may see that game again. We have been trying to make many games and that may be one of them … I personally love Wave Race!"

== See also ==
- Splashdown
