= MX Superfly =

2002 video game

- North American Xbox cover art
- Developer: Pacific Coast Power & Light
- Publisher: THQ
- Producer: Dennis Harper
- Composer: Steve Kirk
- Series: MX
- Engine: RenderWare
- Platforms: Xbox; PlayStation 2 GameCube
- Release: PlayStation 2: NA: June 18, 2002; PAL: October 11, 2002; GameCube: NA: June 27, 2002; EU: October 4, 2002; AU: 2002; Xbox: NA: November 20, 2002; PAL: March 21, 2003
- Genres: Sports, racing
- Modes: Single-player, multiplayer

MX Superfly featuring Ricky Carmichael, released as MX Super Fly in PAL regions, is a motocross racing game developed by Pacific Coast Power & Light and published by THQ for the Xbox, PlayStation 2, and GameCube. It is the second installment of THQ's MX trilogy and a sequel to MX 2002 featuring Ricky Carmichael, garnering professional motocross racer Ricky Carmichael's endorsement like its predecessor.

THQ released a third MX game in 2004, titled MX Unleashed and developed by its newly acquired subsidiary Rainbow Studios, the eventual creator of the MX vs. ATV series that serves as a crossover with Sony's ATV Offroad Fury series.

== Gameplay ==
Players are able to create a male or female MX rider of their own and play in either two modes: racing or freestyle. The former consists of races against opposing racers controlled by artificial intelligence, while the latter consists of levels taking place in various environments where the player must independently accomplish certain challenges. It is also possible to play with a friend in split screen multiplayer, and the Xbox version exclusively featured downloadable content consisting of extra soundtracks, riders and bikes that could be downloaded from the Xbox Live service.

== Development ==
The game had a marketing budget of $4 million.

== Reception ==
Reception

Aggregate score
| Aggregator | Score | | |
| Aggregator | GameCube | PS2 | Xbox |
|---|---|---|---|
| Metacritic | 76/100 | 76/100 | 74/100 |

Review scores
| Publication | Score | | |
| Publication | GameCube | PS2 | Xbox |
|---|---|---|---|
| Electronic Gaming Monthly | 7.5/10 | 7.5/10 | 7.5/10 |
| Game Informer | 7/10 | 7.25/10 | N/A |
| GameSpot | 7.9/10 | 7.9/10 | 7.9/10 |
| GameSpy | 83% | 3.5/5 | 4/5 |
| GameZone | 7.8/10 | 7.7/10 | 8.7/10 |
| IGN | 8.5/10 | 8.4/10 | 8.2/10 |
| Nintendo Power | 3.2/5 | N/A | N/A |
| Official U.S. PlayStation Magazine | N/A | 3.5/5 | N/A |
| Official Xbox Magazine (US) | N/A | N/A | 7.4/10 |
| X-Play | N/A | N/A | 4/5 |

The GameCube and PlayStation 2 versions received "generally favorable reviews", while the Xbox version received "mixed or average reviews", according to the review aggregation website Metacritic.
