= Rainbow Studios =

American video game developer

- Formerly: Rainbow Multimedia Group (1986–1992); THQ Digital Studios Phoenix (2010–2011)
- Company type: Private
- Industry: Video games
- Founded: 1986; 40 years ago
- Founder: Earl Jarred
- Headquarters: Phoenix, Arizona, United States
- Key people: Lenore Gilbert (CEO)
- Products: Motocross Madness series; MX vs. ATV series
- Number of employees: 61 (2021)
- Parent: THQ (2002–2011); THQ Nordic (2013–2024)
- Subsidiaries: Rainbow Studios Montréal
- Website: rainbowstudios.com

Rainbow Studios is an American video game developer based in Phoenix, Arizona, best known for developing offroad racing games, such as Motocross Madness and the MX vs. ATV series. It was established by Earl Jarred in 1986 under the name Rainbow Multimedia Group and rebranded as Rainbow Studios in 1992. In January 2002, the company was acquired by THQ, under the ownership of which it was renamed THQ Digital Studios Phoenix in February 2010 and closed in August 2011. The studio was re-instated as Rainbow Studios in 2013 by Nordic Games (later known as THQ Nordic), a publishing company that had purchased most assets of the then-bankrupt THQ earlier that year. The studio is now independent.

== History ==
Rainbow Studios, originally named Rainbow Multimedia Group, was founded by Earl Jarred in 1986. In 1992, the company shifted its focus towards developing video games and was rebranded Rainbow Studios. On November 8, 2001, video game publisher THQ announced that it had agreed to acquire the studio in exchange for 1 million shares of common stock. An agreement of merger was signed between the two companies on December 21, 2001, and THQ announced that the deal had been completed on January 3, 2002, at which point THQ had issued 858,203 shares and expected to issue further 106,259 at a later point in time. In 2005, Jarred, alongside vice chairman Jeff Padden and employees Rick Baltman and Robb Rinard, left Rainbow Studios to form a new video game studio, 2XL Games. Three further Rainbow Studios veterans—Brad Ruminer, Dennis Booth, and Glenn O'Bannon—announced the formation of their studio, TimeFly Studios, in April 2008.

In mid-April 2008, Rainbow Studios laid off a team of 30 people working on an unannounced game. Because the team was "a minority" in the studio's multi-team setup, development on the game was able to continue despite the staff reduction. Further layoffs were instigated in November 2008 and February 2009 as part of larger restructurings within THQ. To push THQ's vision for digitally distributed games as part of its core portfolio, effective on February 3, Rainbow Studios and sister studio Juice Games were rebranded as THQ Digital Studios Phoenix and THQ Digital Studios Warrington, respectively. As a result of the restructuring, both studios collectively lost 60 employees. On August 9, 2011, THQ announced that, as part of another larger restructuring, THQ Digital Studios Phoenix would be closed down. The closure led to the elimination of 48 jobs at the Phoenix studio. THQ planned to retain a quality assurance department on-site.

THQ later filed for bankruptcy, and many of its assets, including the Rainbow Studios-developed MX vs. ATV franchise, were auctioned off to publisher Nordic Games (later known as THQ Nordic) in 2013. As Nordic Games planned to start developing new titles in that franchise, the company opted to resurrect Rainbow Studios under the former name and in its former location. The move was announced in December that year, at which point the new Rainbow Studios had hired many people previously employed by the former Rainbow Studios, including Ken George, Dave Dwire, Mike Mamula, Brad Bowling, Scott Hofmann, Justin Walsh, David Knudsen, and Lenore Gilbert. By June 2019, Rainbow Studios had 41 employees. As of October 2019, Gilbert serves as Rainbow Studios' chief executive officer.

In September 2023, Rainbow Studios suffered an unknown number of layoffs as part of the Embracer Group's effort to reduce costs. At some point, Rainbow Studios went independent and is now employee owned.

== Games developed ==
Year	Title	Platform(s)	Publisher(s)
1994	Air Havoc Controller	Microsoft Windows	Trimark Interactive
1995	The Hive	Microsoft Windows, PlayStation	Trimark Interactive
1996	Deadly Tide	Microsoft Windows	Microsoft
1996	Ravage D.C.X	Microsoft Windows	Inscape
1998	Motocross Madness	Microsoft Windows	Microsoft
2000	Motocross Madness 2	Microsoft Windows	Microsoft
2000	Tiger Woods PGA Tour 2000	Microsoft Windows	EA Sports
2001	ATV Offroad Fury	PlayStation 2	Sony Computer Entertainment
2001	Splashdown	PlayStation 2, Xbox	Infogrames
2002	ATV Offroad Fury 2	PlayStation 2	Sony Computer Entertainment
2002	Mat Hoffman's Pro BMX 2	PlayStation 2, Xbox	Activision
2002	Star Wars Racer Revenge	PlayStation 2	LucasArts
2003	Splashdown: Rides Gone Wild	PlayStation 2	THQ
2004	MX Unleashed	PlayStation 2, Xbox	THQ
2005	MX vs. ATV Unleashed	PlayStation 2, Xbox	THQ
2006	Cars	Game Boy Advance, GameCube, Wii, PlayStation 2, Xbox, Xbox 360	THQ
2007	Cars Mater-National Championship	Microsoft Windows, PlayStation 2, PlayStation 3, Wii, Xbox 360	THQ
2007	MX vs. ATV Untamed	PlayStation 3, Xbox 360	THQ
2009	Deadly Creatures	Wii	THQ
2009	MX vs. ATV Reflex	PlayStation 3, Xbox 360	THQ
2010	Dood's Big Adventure	Wii	THQ
2011	MX vs. ATV Alive	PlayStation 3, Xbox 360	THQ
2014	MX vs. ATV Supercross	PlayStation 3, Xbox 360	Nordic Games
2015	MX vs ATV: Supercross Encore	Microsoft Windows, PlayStation 4, Xbox One	Nordic Games
2018	MX vs ATV All Out	Microsoft Windows, Nintendo Switch, PlayStation 4, Xbox One	THQ Nordic
2019	Monster Jam: Steel Titans	Microsoft Windows, Nintendo Switch, PlayStation 4, Stadia, Xbox One	THQ Nordic
2021	Monster Jam: Steel Titans 2	Microsoft Windows, Nintendo Switch, PlayStation 4, Stadia, Xbox One	THQ Nordic
2022	MX vs ATV Legends	Microsoft Windows, PlayStation 4, Xbox One, PlayStation 5, Xbox Series X/S	THQ Nordic
