= Jet Moto =

Series of futuristic racing games for the PlayStation video game console

- Jet Moto series logo
- Genre: Racing
- Developers: SingleTrac (Jet Moto and Jet Moto 2), Pacific Coast Power & Light (Jet Moto 3)
- Publishers: Sony Computer Entertainment (Jet Moto and Jet Moto 2), 989 Sports (Jet Moto 3)
- Creators: Matthew Greenberg; Bill Platter
- First release: Jet Moto; October 31, 1996
- Latest release: Jet Moto 3 September 16, 1999

Jet Moto is a series of futuristic racing games for the PlayStation video game console. Jet Moto (1996) and Jet Moto 2 (1997) were developed by SingleTrac, known for Twisted Metal and Twisted Metal 2. SingleTrac then left Sony, the publisher of the series, and Jet Moto 3 (1999) was developed by Pacific Coast Power & Light in their absence. They would also go on to develop Jet Moto 2124, which was cancelled two years into development. A fifth title known as Jet Moto: SOLAR was being developed by RedZone Interactive for the PlayStation 2, but no screenshots or video of gameplay were ever officially released, and the game was cancelled in 2003. In December 2022, gameplay footage of Jet Moto: SOLAR was uploaded to YouTube.

== Common gameplay elements ==
Gameplay in the Jet Moto series differs from traditional racing games, as players instead control hoverbikes which hover close above the ground and can be driven over both land and water. Most of the courses in the games are designed to take advantage of this ability. The game has its variant of the traditional road course, but also introduces a new course type, known as a suicide course. Instead of being a continuous loop, these tracks have checkpoints at either end of the course, and the starting grid in the center. Characters race to one end, then turn around to head for the other checkpoint, repeating the process until all laps are complete. This provides a new gameplay dynamic as often the player must navigate oncoming traffic. Characters are split into teams, and bikes are adorned with logos of products such as Mountain Dew and Butterfinger, similar to real-life sponsored racing.

The Jet Moto series utilizes a system called the magnetic grapple. Pressing the assigned button near a red energy pole creates a magnetic attraction between the player's bike and the pole. Energy poles are often placed strategically throughout the courses, enabling racers to "slingshot" around tight turns without slowing down. The magnetic grapple system is also sometimes used to swing over large gaps and chasms otherwise too large to ride over. In addition to the grapple system players are given four boosts per lap, which provide a temporary burst of speed.

== Games ==
=== Jet Moto ===
In Jet Moto players control hoverbikes known as jet motos. These bikes have the ability to hover over both land and water.

The original Jet Moto (Jet Rider in Europe) was developed by SingleTrac and published by Sony Computer Entertainment for the PlayStation and PC. The PlayStation version was released in North America on October 31, 1996, and 1997 for Europe in February, and for Japan on August 7. The PC version was released on November 30, 1997. Jet Moto was made available for the PlayStation Portable and PlayStation 3 via the PlayStation Network on February 4, 2007.

Twenty characters and three tracks are available at the beginning of the game, with seven more tracks unlockable by winning tournaments. Traditional tracks are also included, and typical courses range from beaches with debris-littered water, ice-covered mountains, and even a floating track set above a city.

At the time of its release Jet Moto was seen as Sony's response to Nintendo's Wave Race 64. Reviews for the game were mixed, and Jet Moto the PC version holds 75% and the PlayStation version 78.9% at gaming aggregator GameRankings. Reviewers felt the game had solid gameplay, but criticized its high difficulty. Several reviewers praised the soundtrack to the game. Game Revolution called the Dick Dale-esque music "reminiscent of spy tunes from James Bond movies". The surf guitar was a strong point for Electric Playground, who cited it as one of the best video game soundtracks of 1996. GameSpot reviewer Shane Mooney said the soundtrack was "just the adrenaline pump [he] needed". Jet Moto's popularity would earn it a spot in the PlayStation Greatest Hits in August 1998.

=== Jet Moto 2 ===
Jet Moto 2 (known as Jet Rider 2 in Europe and Jet Moto '98 in Japan) was released for the PlayStation in 1997. A Greatest Hits version of the game was also released. Due to an error during the disc printing process, a special edition version, Jet Moto 2: Championship Edition was printed instead of the original. This version featured six fewer competitors, but increased the game's speed to 30 frames per second. Jet Moto 2 was added to the PlayStation Network in January 2008.

The amount of playable characters for this game was halved in comparison to the first game, with ten characters available at the beginning of the game and one unlockable character. Track amounts were greatly increased, however, with ten new tracks, and tracks from the original game. All the original Jet Moto tracks were locked from the start. The first original track became available to play after all of Jet Moto 2's tracks were unlocked. Once the player got third place or better on one of the original tracks it would become unlocked and next original track would be available to play. Due to an error in printing all of the original tracks were unlocked from the start in the greatest hits version of the game, and ran at a faster speed than the original - albeit with only four racers. Tracks are more varied than Jet Moto, with each level containing a unique theme rather than the shared themes of the original game. The courses range from earthquake-damaged cities, desert Canyons, ice-covered mountains, roller Coasters, and several others.

The difficulty was higher in this game; the developers used gameplay recordings in place of fully developed racer AI, so most racers had a perfect run and any mistakes made by the player would result in a quick loss of top racing positions. Dual Analog Controllers were supported for the first time, as well as DualShock Controllers but without any vibration feedback.

=== Jet Moto 3 ===
Jet Moto 3 was released for the PlayStation in North America only on August 31, 1999. A new developer and publisher would take over the series, Pacific Coast Power & Light and 989 Sports. It was released on the PlayStation Network on February 21, 2008, but was removed shortly thereafter for undisclosed reasons.

This Jet Moto is notable for the inclusion of new stunt tracks. The objective of these tracks is to perform stunts to gain higher points and to collect coins scattered throughout the track. Another notable inclusion is the hop button, which is used to boost your player above the ground to avoid obstacles. The physics also were given an overhaul. Many times the player's bike travels so fast that it can be stuck riding on walls. Graphics were also considerably smoother as the game was released two years after the original games, but suffered greatly due to the use of heavy texturing as was common for PlayStation games of the time. Track themes vary greatly, with tracks taking places in volcanic islands, catacombs, the heights of Machu Picchu, and a thick Sequoia forest. DualShock Controller support was added to this installment.

=== Cancelled games ===
==== Jet Moto 2124 ====
Concept art of a light jet moto for Jet Moto 2124. Art by Laura Janczewski.

A fourth Jet Moto, called Jet Moto 2124, was being developed at Sony's 989 Studio in San Diego and was set to be based in the future. Production on the game began prior to the completion of Jet Moto 3. Level designers used Alias Power Animator 8.5 to create tracks for the game. Developers took inspiration from Syd Mead when coming up with concepts and designs for the game. Jet Moto 2124 would have been the first in the series to take the player to locations off Earth, including Mars, the moon and one of Jupiter's moons, Europa. Additional real-world sponsors had been solicited for in-game sponsoring, including Doritos, Slim Jim, and Body Glove. The game was to have redesigned physics and increased speed, giving 2124 "the Jet Moto feel but with Wipeout speed". Inspiration was also taken from freestyle motocross, and the ability would have been given to the player to do in air-tricks such as the heel clicker and can-can, similar to modern day tricks performed on specialized dirtbikes.

Developers cited lack of marketing support, camera issues and a flawed physics model for the jet motos as a few of the main concerns with the game's development. Other concerns included a new company president that did not support the game, and the studio director seeking to widen all the tracks, causing a significant increase in development time. These, along with lackluster sales of Jet Moto 3, led to the cancellation of 2124 two years into production, just prior to beta testing.

==== Jet Moto: SOLAR ====
In 2003 a PlayStation 2 project known as Jet Moto: SOLAR was rumored to be in development by RedZone Interactive, but no press releases or gameplay information were released to the public. On April 4 in minor coverage by IGN, the game was confirmed to be cancelled, subsequently confirming its development. A software design document and a document containing fictional character bios for the game surfaced in 2005 on the personal website of George Rothrock, co-founder of RedZone Interactive. SOLAR was set several hundred years after the original Jet Moto series, when the hover technology from the jet moto bikes had evolved into a new style of moto, the Gravity Resistant Vehicle (GRV). Locales would again expand to other locations off Earth, including Mars, the moon, and Ganymede, one of the moons of Jupiter.
