= ATV Offroad Fury =

2001 video game

- Developer: Rainbow Studios
- Publisher: Sony Computer Entertainment
- Series: ATV Offroad Fury
- Platform: PlayStation 2
- Release: NA: February 6, 2001; EU: July 13, 2001
- Genre: Racing
- Modes: Single-player, multiplayer

ATV Offroad Fury is a 2001 racing video game developed by Rainbow Studios and published by Sony Computer Entertainment for the PlayStation 2.

A sequel, ATV Offroad Fury 2, was released in 2002.

== Gameplay ==
The player may choose between 12 different types of all-terrain vehicles and race on 20 different free-roaming tracks in a variety of types, including Training, MAXXIS Nationals, Stadium Supercross, Freestyle Competitions, Cross Country Enduro, and Pro-Career, as well as various multiplayer modes. Each of the different game types have different objectives the player must accomplish in order to succeed. The player can perform stunts in Freestyle and it will award them with points.

=== Race modes ===
The game features three race "modes" that can be accessed through the track selection screen: Single Race, Lap Attack, and Practice. These cannot be selected during Pro-Career mode, and not all modes are available during certain events.

== Reception ==
Reception

Aggregate score
Aggregator	Score
Metacritic	82/100

Review scores
Publication	Score
AllGame	3.5/5
Electronic Gaming Monthly	8.67/10 (Note: In Electronic Gaming Monthly's review of the game, one critic gave it 9/10, and the rest gave it each a score of 8.5/10.)
EP Daily	8/10
Game Informer	8.5/10
GameSpot	6.7/10
GameSpy	88%
IGN	8.7/10
Next Generation	4/5
Official U.S. PlayStation Magazine	4/5
PlayStation: The Official Magazine	8/10

ATV Offroad Fury received "favorable" reviews according to the review aggregation website Metacritic. Jeff Lundrigan of NextGen said that "the game sports brilliant graphics, a (mostly) rock-solid framerate, intense tracks, a plethora of options, and excellent control." Air Hendrix of GamePro said that the game "will reward offroad racing fans with gameplay and challenges that definitely suit their interests. If that's not you, though, you should probably rent Fury to see if it's a ride you'll enjoy." (Note: GamePro gave the game three 4/5 scores for graphics, sound, and control, and 3.5/5 for fun factor.)

By July 2006, the game had sold 1.7 million units and earned $49 million in the U.S. NextGen ranked it as the 20th highest-selling game launched for the PlayStation 2, Xbox or GameCube between February 2001 and July 2006 in that country. Combined sales of ATV Offroad console games released in the 2000s reached 4.5 million units in the U.S. by July 2006.
