= MX vs. ATV Alive =

2011 video game

- Developer: THQ Digital Studios Phoenix
- Publisher: THQ
- Series: MX vs. ATV
- Platforms: PlayStation 3, Xbox 360
- Release: NA: May 10, 2011; AU: May 11, 2011; EU: May 13, 2011
- Genre: Racing
- Modes: Single-player, multiplayer

MX vs. ATV Alive is an off-road racing game developed by THQ Digital Studios Phoenix and published by THQ. The game is the fourth title in the MX vs. ATV series, following MX vs. ATV Reflex, and the last game in the series published by THQ. MX vs. ATV Alive was released on May 10, 2011 for PlayStation 3 and Xbox 360. It was the first THQ game to be launched with a new pricing model, where the game would be sold at a lower retail price than most new releases ($39.99 in the United States), but with a larger amount of paid downloadable content. A later installment of the series, MX vs. ATV: All Out, also utilized a similar pricing model.

== Reception ==
Reception

Aggregate score
Aggregator	Score
Metacritic	(X360) 63/100 (PS3) 61/100

Review scores
Publication	Score
GameRevolution	2.5/10
GameSpot	6.5/10
GamesRadar+	3.5/5
IGN	6.5/10

MX vs. ATV Alive was released to mixed reviews; its PlayStation 3 and Xbox 360 versions attained an aggregate score of 61 and 63 on Metacritic, respectively. Much of its criticism was directed towards the game's intentional lack of initial content due to its DLC-oriented structure. In particular, Computer and Video Games felt that the business model was interesting, but made the resulting game "overly minimal to point of it feeling like a rip off despite the slightly lower price tag".

GameZone gave the game a 7.5/10, considering it to be "an enjoyable, competent off-road racer that succeeds due to its impressive style but struggles from some glaring limitations". While its overall gameplay was considered to be enjoyable and comparable to an arcade-style game, graphical glitches were seen once in a while, and the lack of courses resulting from their slow unlock time led to a repetitive experience.

GameSpot and IGN praised the aggressive racing, varied track designs, and player customization options, while criticizing the lack of a career mode, lack of gameplay modes, and frustrating unlock system.

After Nordic Games acquired MX vs. ATV and THQ's other remaining franchises during their April 2013 liquidation, the company responded to queries on the game's forum regarding missing, unreleased servers and unannounced multiplayer server shutdowns for the game, and stated that they would look into the issues.
