= MX vs. ATV Untamed =

2007 video game

- Developers: Rainbow Studios; Tantalus Media (handhelds); Incinerator Studios (PS2 & Wii); Universomo (mobile)
- Publisher: THQ
- Series: MX vs. ATV
- Platforms: Nintendo DS; PlayStation 2; PlayStation 3; PlayStation Portable; Xbox 360; Wii; mobile phones
- Release: NA: December 17, 2007; EU: March 7, 2008; AU: March 13, 2008; Wii: NA: February 18, 2008; EU: March 7, 2008; AU: March 27, 2008; Mobile phone 2008
- Genre: Racing
- Modes: Single-player, multiplayer

MX vs. ATV Untamed is an offroad racing game developed by Rainbow Studios, Tantalus Media, Incinerator Studios and published by THQ for the PlayStation 2 and all seventh-generation platforms, becoming the last MX vs. ATV game to release on the former and the first in the series to be available on most of the latter. It is a sequel to MX vs. ATV Unleashed and its PSP port, MX vs. ATV: On the Edge, as well as the first of two games in the MX vs. ATV series to be available on a Nintendo console.

== Gameplay ==
The game encompasses several modes: Motocross, Opencross, Supercross, Supermoto, Endurocross, Free Ride and Minibikes, among others. The player has a relatively wide choice of vehicles, from monster trucks, to trophy trucks, to ATVs to motorbikes. In some modes, gameplay takes place over two motos, or qualifying events. The player's finishing position in the first moto determines who gets gate choice in the second moto. The player's finishing position in each moto determines how many points he or she gets. The goal is to finish the weekend with the most points. Additionally, in some modes, the player can participate in a short practice race, which can help players become familiar with the track and the vehicle prior to the two motos. Setting the fastest time in practice gives the player first gate choice for the first moto. There is also a "Free Ride" mode which allows the player to explore indoor and outdoor locations featured in the other modes without time or track restrictions.

All versions of Untamed support multiplayer, with handheld versions supporting up to 4 players via a local wireless network (without cross-platform play) and the console versions supporting head-to-head racing between just two players on split-screen, while utilizing online multiplayer to support contests with larger player pools, similar to its predecessor Unleashed. The Wii version supports multiple control schemes, namely the Wii Wheel, the Wii Remote and Nunchuk or the Classic Controller, with most control schemes leveraging motion controls to steer and execute tricks. The mobile version is a side-scrolling racer, omitting the larger machines to focusing on MX and ATV only.

This was also the last game in the MX vs. ATV series to feature single stick turning controls. In Untamed, only the left joystick is used to control all aspects of leaning and turning for the vehicle in use. All versions of the game that were released after MX vs. ATV Untamed included dual-stick controls, which require the player to use both the left and right joystick to complete a full turning motion. Often in these games, one stick would be used to lean the rider in the desired direction while the other would be used to turn the vehicle in unison.

Tuning options are available in the settings of the game. Performance options include acceleration, speed, suspension, engine, and brakes. Many of the settings are customizable to varying degrees using a sliding bar. For example, sliding the bar down for suspension would create softer suspension, while sliding the bar up would make for stiffer suspension.

Visual customization options are also available within the game, but they do not affect the overall performance of the player. Visual customization for vehicles is found under the "vehicle parts" tab and includes graphic kits, grip color, hand guards, handlebars, plastic color, hub color, tires, rim color, exhausts, suspensions, and fork tube color. Visual customization for the rider is found under the "customize rider" tab and includes helmets, goggles, gear, boots, chest protectors, name, number, and skin tone. If players wish to use a predetermined setup, they can also choose one from the "MX Pro Rider" tab in the customization options.

== Development and release ==
Untamed was first announced by THQ during E3 2007. THQ sought to bring Untamed to a wider variety of platforms in order to "deliver unique experiences that capture the franchise's strengths and maximize the fun gamers have on their system of choice", and commissioned as many as three developers to work on its various versions. The series' main developer, Rainbow Studios, developed the PlayStation 3 and Xbox 360 versions, while two new firms Incinerator Studios (a THQ subsidiary) and Tanatalus Media were each assigned to work on two other platforms. Incinerator Studios, the developer of the Wii and PS2 versions, decided to spend some more time developing the Wii version to best implement its motion controls, resulting in that version releasing later than all the other versions in North America and Australia.

Untamed was originally planned for an early 2008 release. Ultimately, it was first released in North America in time for the 2007 holiday season, and eventually became available for PAL territories the following March, with all versions releasing simultaneously in Europe.

== Reception ==
Reception

Aggregate score
Aggregator	Score					
Aggregator	DS	PS2	PS3	PSP	Wii	Xbox 360
Metacritic	61/100	53/100	67/100	59/100	70/100	70/100

Review scores
Publication	Score					
Publication	DS	PS2	PS3	PSP	Wii	Xbox 360
Electronic Gaming Monthly	N/A	N/A	6/10	N/A	N/A	6/10
Eurogamer	N/A	N/A	N/A	N/A	N/A	6/10
Game Informer	N/A	7.5/10	8/10	N/A	7.5/10	8/10
GamePro	1.5/5	N/A	N/A	1.75/5	N/A	3/5
GameRevolution	N/A	N/A	N/A	N/A	N/A	B
GameSpot	N/A	N/A	6.5/10	5.5/10	N/A	6.5/10
GameSpy	N/A	3/5	4/5	N/A	N/A	4/5
GameTrailers	N/A	N/A	7.6/10	N/A	N/A	7.6/10
GameZone	7.1/10	5/10	8/10	5/10	N/A	7.4/10
IGN	7/10	4.9/10	7.4/10	7.2/10	7/10	7.4/10
Nintendo Power	6/10	N/A	N/A	N/A	6/10	N/A
Official Xbox Magazine (US)	N/A	N/A	N/A	N/A	N/A	5/10
PlayStation: The Official Magazine	N/A	N/A	4/5	N/A	N/A	N/A
Maxim	N/A	N/A	6/10	N/A	N/A	6/10

MX vs. ATV Untamed received "mixed or average" reviews, according to review aggregator website Metacritic.

GameZone gave the Mobile phone version a score of six out of ten and called it "a better-than-average mobile racer", but said it was "a few gallons short of a full tank".
