= Wave Race =

1992 video game

- Developers: Nintendo EAD; Pax Softnica
- Publisher: Nintendo
- Director: Masayuki Kameyama
- Producer: Shigeru Miyamoto
- Programmers: Masayuki Hirashima; Yoshiaki Hoshino
- Artist: Hideo Kon
- Composer: Taisuke Araki
- Series: Wave Race
- Platform: Game Boy
- Release: NA: July 1992; EU: June 24, 1997
- Genre: Racing
- Modes: Single-player, multiplayer

Wave Race is a 1992 racing video game developed and published by Nintendo for the Game Boy. It is the first game in the Wave Race series. The player controls a jet skier competing against AI opponents or up to three friends (using the GameBoy multiplayer link cable accessory) in two different racing modes across sixteen tracks.

== Gameplay ==
Gameplay screenshot

The game contains two gameplay modes. In "Slalom", the goal is to take posts by racing through pairs of posts across the track. Each post a racer passes through increases their score by one point. The racer with the most points once all posts have been taken wins. In "Race", players must proceed through certain checkpoints and complete each lap in a set time limit. Two on track powerups are available. The dolphin powerup gives the player increased turning ability, while the octopus powerup allows the recipient to steal from opponents.

There are eight tracks for each mode (a combined total of sixteen tracks). In both modes, racers have to navigate a variety of on track obstacles (buoys, pylons, shallow water, whirlpools) and jumps. Players begin at a slower class of watercraft and graduate to faster engines. Players can also use a limited turbo boost. The game features four-player multiplayer.

== Development and release ==
Wave Race was developed by Pax Softnica and published by Nintendo for the Game Boy. Games Asylum described it as a top-down racer similar to the boat races in Micro Machines (video game series, in which the jet skis' physics gave the feeling of racing on water rather than tarmac.

The game was released in North America in July 1992 and in Europe on 24 June 1997, almost five years later. Wave Race 64 had been announced in 1995 and was released in Japan and the United States in 1996, and in Europe in April 1997. There are several possible reasons suggested for the delay: Nintendo Europe may have doubted the game's quality in 1992, or the 1997 launch of the Game Boy Pocket gave Nintendo a chance to repackage older titles. It is also possible that Nintendo wished to build franchise awareness in order to push sales of Wave Race 64. In the United Kingdom the game was released as a budget title at £9.99 and was often packaged with the Game Boy Pocket. By August 1997 it was being sold by mail-order retailers there.

== Reception ==
Reception

Review scores
Publication	Score
Game Players	7/10
HobbyConsolas	60/100
Joypad	45%
Joystick	84%
Mega Fun	80%
Nintendo Power	3.7/5
Player One	90%
Total!	2
Video Games (DE)	77%
Consolemania	84/100
N-Force	52%
Nintendo Acción	60/100
Power Unlimited	71/100

Wave Race on the Game Boy garnered average reception from critics. Nintendo Power's George Sinfield and Rob Noel wrote that the game successfully emulated the feel of watercraft racing. They praised the effect of skidding around corners, and recommended the four-player multiplayer experience. A writer for German magazine Mega Fun commended the game's audiovisual presentation, playability and multiplayer mode. Joystick's Olivier Karali gave the game favorable remarks for its "exemplary" playability, particularly the controls. N-Force's Nick Roberts and Carl Rowley considered it a mediocre and frustrating racing game. While they found the visuals to be well detailed and the soundtrack average, they felt its gameplay lacked depth.

Consolemania's Alessandro Rossetto praised the game's realistic controls, sound, and playability, but criticized the graphics for their lack of variety. Selby Bateman of Game Players Nintendo Guide noted the solid feel the personal watercraft have when turning in the water. Bateman also commended the game's graphical department, multiplayer mode, and auto-save feature. Video Games' Michael Paul highlighted the game's controls and difficulty level, stating that "If you're looking for a multi-player game that's also fun to play solo, Wave Race is the right wave for you". Total!'s Thomas Hellwig and Sandra Alter found it to be a thrilling title, citing its intelligent opponents and tracks, but saw the poor collision detection and constant flickering as shortcomings.

Hobby Consolas criticized Wave Race on the Game Boy for its weak visuals and poor playability. Nintendo Acción's Juan Carlos García faulted the game's mediocre graphics, repetitive tracks, and viewing perspective. Power Unlimited recommended the game for "speed enthusiasts who love the Game Boy". Joypad's Kendy Ty panned its slow scrolling, and labelled it as a "poor man's Micro Machines". Player One's Stéphane Pilet lauded its audiovisual department, playability, and multiplayer. Writing for Retro Gamer, Clarance Frank regarded it as "A nice start to the Wave Race franchise which, while differing greatly from its later console counterparts, contained plenty of ideas that transferred successfully into the 3-D versions". In a series retrospective, Jon Partridge of Red Bull Games celebrated its fresh take on the racing genre, tight controls, gameplay, unique setting, and multiplayer.

== Legacy ==
Wave Race sold well enough that it was eventually added to Nintendo's Player's Choice marketing label (a marketing label that promoted a lineup of the best selling Nintendo games). It was later followed by two sequels: Wave Race 64 and Wave Race: Blue Storm. Unlike the first game, Wave Race 64 and Wave Race: Blue Storm were also released in Japan.
