= Wave Race 64 =

1996 video game

- North American N64 box art
- Developer: Nintendo EAD
- Publisher: Nintendo
- Directors: Katsuya Eguchi; Shinya Takahashi
- Producer: Shigeru Miyamoto
- Programmer: Keizo Ohta
- Composer: Kazumi Totaka
- Series: Wave Race
- Platforms: Nintendo 64, iQue Player
- Release: Nintendo 64: JP: September 27, 1996; NA: November 4, 1996; PAL: April 29, 1997; iQue Player: CHN: November 18, 2003
- Genre: Racing
- Modes: Single-player, multiplayer

Wave Race 64 (Note: Japanese: ウエーブレース64, Hepburn: Uēbu Rēsu Rokujūyon) is a 1996 racing video game developed and published by Nintendo for the Nintendo 64. It is the second entry in the Wave Race series following the 1992 Game Boy game Wave Race. Gameplay involves the player racing on a personal watercraft on a variety of courses while successfully manoeuvring the vehicle around various buoys. A multiplayer mode where two players can compete against each other on a chosen course is also included. The game supports the Controller Pak, which allows players to transfer saved data from one game cartridge to another. The game is presented in a letterboxed 14:9 aspect ratio.

Originally referred to as "F-Zero on water", the game was intended to feature high-speed boats with transforming capabilities, but these were ultimately replaced with Jet Skis as producer Shigeru Miyamoto felt that the game would not be differentiated enough from other titles on other systems. Wave Race 64 received acclaim from critics, who praised the game's satisfying controls and dynamic watery environments and considered as one of the best games ever made. The game is credited with helping Nintendo effectively make its paradigmatic leap from the 16-bit 2D graphics of the Super Nintendo Entertainment System to the Nintendo 64's 3D capabilities. It was re-released for the Wii and Wii U's Virtual Console in 2007 and 2016, respectively, and on the Nintendo Classics service in 2022. A sequel, Wave Race: Blue Storm, was released for the GameCube in 2001.

== Gameplay ==
The player races an opponent on the Sunny Beach course. The arrows at the bottom right corner of the screen indicate the personal watercraft's current power.

Wave Race 64 is a racing video game in which players race on personal watercraft in different weather conditions and on a variety of courses. The game features three single-player modes (Championship, Time Trials, and Stunt Mode) as well as a multiplayer mode for competitive play. In the Championship mode, the player must race opponents through a series of courses and win the first place. Up to four levels of difficulty can be chosen: Normal, Hard, Expert and Reverse, the latter being Expert with the tracks oriented backwards. Hard, Expert, and Reverse must be unlocked by completing an earlier difficulty. The difficulty also determines the number of courses played: six in Normal, seven in Hard, and eight in Expert/Reverse. When the player completes a course, points are awarded based on the rank they finished. If the required quantity is not met, the player will be disqualified and the game will be over.

While racing opponents, the player must successfully manoeuvre the Jet Ski around various buoys. There are two types of buoys: red colored, which must be passed on the right side, and yellow buoys, which must be passed on the left side. Each time a buoy is correctly passed, a power arrow in the game's HUD will light, allowing the player's watercraft to gain speed. Up to five power arrows can be lit in order to obtain maximum power. Therefore, maintaining this process will allow the player to maintain a high speed. Failure to correctly pass a single buoy will result in the loss of all the player's accumulated power (though the power arrows can be lit again one by one) and missing five buoys over the course of a race will result in disqualification. Leaving the course area limited by pink buoys for more than five seconds will also result in disqualification.

In Time Trials, the player can freely race on a course to perform the best times, which are recorded in the game's data. In the Stunt Mode, the player must earn points by executing stunts and passing through rings. The points depend upon how many rings the player passes through without missing, as well as the class of stunt that has been performed. The multiplayer mode uses a horizontal split-screen and allows two players to compete against each other on a chosen course. Only the courses that have been unlocked in the Championship mode can be played in the Time Trials, Stunt, and multiplayer modes. The game offers four personalized racers for players to select from, each having their own strengths and weaknesses. A Nintendo 64 Controller Pak can be used to transfer saved data from one game cartridge to another.

== Development and release ==
Wave Race 64 was developed by Nintendo EAD and produced by Shigeru Miyamoto as one of the first Nintendo 64 games. Development of the game was led by Shinya Takahashi, who had been working with Nintendo since 1989. Takahashi, along with Yoshiaki Koizumi, who worked with Miyamoto on Super Mario 64, are credited for helping the company effectively make its paradigmatic leap from the 16-bit 2D graphics of the Super Nintendo Entertainment System to the Nintendo 64's 3D capabilities. Since the game's engineers only had experience with the 2D graphics of earlier Nintendo consoles, Takahashi had to guide them through the first stages of development. While experimenting with the Nintendo 64's Silicon Graphics technology, one of the programmers created a tech demo that served as an example of the game's wave programming. The tech demo caught the attention of Miyamoto, and soon the team began to figure out a way to create "something fun" from it.

Originally, the game was referred to as "F-Zero on water" and would feature high-speed boats, as shown in footage from the 1995 Nintendo Shoshinkai show. The boats were planned to have transforming capabilities, allowing players to switch from a stable catamaran-style form to a more streamlined canoe-style version. However, the boats were ultimately replaced with Jet Skis at the suggestion of Rare's Tim Stamper. Miyamoto explained that "boats looked pretty good at the show, but I didn't think that Wave Race 64 would be unique from similar games on other systems if we used boats. Jet Skis can show many maneuvers that work well in the realistic water of Wave Race 64". The game uses the Nintendo 64's alpha blending feature to make the water simultaneously transparent and reflective.

Wave Race 64 was promoted with a marketing campaign that cost $4 million. It was first released in Japan in September 1996 on an 8-MB cartridge. In the United States, Wave Race 64 was released as the third Nintendo 64 game on November 4, 1996, featuring voice changes and renamed levels. It was the first racing game developed for the Nintendo 64 and the first to use the Nintendo 64's hardware capabilities to "create a believable and engaging water environment unmatched by previous games". In the United Kingdom, the game was released in April 1997, shortly after the launch of the Nintendo 64. Like Super Mario 64, Wave Race 64 was re-issued in Japan in July 1997 as Wave Race 64 Shindō Pak Taiō Version (ウエーブレース64 振動パック対応バージョン; "Wave Race 64: Rumble Pak-Compatible Version"). This version takes advantage of the Nintendo 64 Rumble Pak and adds ghost functions to the game's time trial mode, in the form of a dolphin that races against the player and represents the previous best time on the course. Some music and sound effects were altered as well.

== Reception ==
Reception

Aggregate score
Aggregator	Score
Metacritic	92/100

Review scores
Publication	Score
AllGame	4.5/5
Computer and Video Games	4/5
Edge	9/10
Electronic Gaming Monthly	9.3/10
EP Daily	100%
Famitsu	8/10, 9/10, 8/10, 9/10
Game Informer	9/10
GameSpot	8.6/10
IGN	9.7/10
N64 Magazine	90%
Next Generation	5/5

Wave Race 64 was a critical and commercial success, selling more than 154,000 units in Japan by December 1996 and more than one million units in the United States by December 1997. As of December 2007, the game had sold 1.95 million copies in the United States. Globally, the game sold 2.95 million units, making it the best selling Wave Race game of all time, and 14th best selling Nintendo 64 game. At the time of its release, some reviewers considered it to be one of the greatest racing games of all time on a home console. GamePro described Wave Race 64 as a "phenomenally fun" racing game that captivates players with its deep and challenging gameplay, while Next Generation regarded it as one of the first quality titles released for the Nintendo 64, along with Super Mario 64 and Pilotwings 64.

Graphically, Wave Race 64 was praised for its fluid animations, realistic physics, clean waters, and textured polygons. IGN's Doug Perry commented that the jetskis in the game provide believable and spectacular experience. Writing for The Electric Playground, Victor Lucas highlighted the game's distinct environments, saying that each course offers players something to get excited about. He also gave high marks to the game's satisfying sound effects, particularly when players submerge under the waves, but felt the music was shallow. GamePro agreed, describing the music as juvenile and the announcer's voice as irritating. In contrast, AllGame's Jonti Davies felt that the game's "cheesy" and "distinctly '80s theme" soundtrack combined with the announcer's "hyperexcited cries" gives the game a light and arcade feel.

N64 Magazine journalists described Wave Race 64 as "one of the deepest racing games" they had played, stating that the game's dynamic waves "constantly tests and re-tests" the player's control and that the buoys system offers tactical decisions about whether to spend time taking a wide corner or dash straight on to catch the leader before it's too late. Similarly, Game Informer remarked that the waves can strike players on every turn and that one mistake can mean the difference between victory and defeat. Edge highly praised the game's believable watery environments and satisfying controls, stating that each of the game's four crafts feature different handling characteristics, which is accentuated by the way they interact with the water. Although the magazine criticized the game's lack of courses, noting that most of them can be seen in a day's play, it ultimately concluded that Wave Race 64 is an example of how Nintendo's approach to game design still remains markedly different from almost every other videogames company in the world.

The controls were generally praised, although Todd Mowatt of Electronic Gaming Monthly (EGM) noted that getting used to them can take some time. Glenn Rubenstein of GameSpot also praised the controls, stating that Wave Race 64 "makes the best use yet" of the Nintendo 64 analog stick. Although he highlighted the multiplayer mode for offering a "fairly good competition", he criticized its small split-screen play areas for detracting from the drama. Alex Huhtala of CVG felt that the game was too short, but admitted that the multiplayer and stunt modes give the game longevity. In March 1997, EGM editors named Wave Race 64 their Sports Game of the Year and a runner-up for their Nintendo 64 Game of the Year award (behind Super Mario 64), citing the realistic physics and variety of tracks.

== Legacy ==
After its release on the Nintendo 64, Wave Race 64 has been included in several top lists. In 1997, EGM ranked the game 68th on its list of 100 Best Games of All Time. In 1999, Next Generation ranked it 20th on a similar list, commenting that Wave Race 64, along with Mario 64, demonstrated more graphical power for the system. IGN editors ranked it 33rd on their 2003 list of Top 100 Games of All Time, and 37th on another list published in 2005. They remarked that Wave Race 64 incorporated water physics into racing unlike any game before it, or any since. The simple concept of racing on jet skis was complicated by changing wave patterns, swells, and rising tides, and Nintendo added its trademark depth to broaden and deepen the unique racer. In 2006, Nintendo Power placed Wave Race 64 at 127th in its "Top 200" games list. In 2009, Official Nintendo Magazine ranked the game 49th on a list of greatest Nintendo games of all time. A sequel, Wave Race: Blue Storm, was released in 2001.

Wave Race 64 was released in China for the iQue Player console in 2003. A 1-hour demo of the game was also included with the console. On August 6, 2007, the game was released on the Wii's Virtual Console. Unlike the Nintendo 64 version, the Virtual Console release does not feature Kawasaki banners due to expired licensing deals. These were replaced by Wii and Nintendo DS advertisements. When the game was released on the Wii U's Virtual Console in 2016, the Kawasaki banners were restored. The game was re-released on the Nintendo Classics service on August 19, 2022, once again with the Kawasaki banners restored. These digital re-releases of the game were generally very well received, with reviewers considering the game to be just as much fun as it was on the Nintendo 64.

Codemasters producer Guy Wilday cited Wave Race 64 as a key influence in the design of their 1998 racing game Colin McRae Rally. According to Wilday, Wave Race 64 is "a fine example of a game with realistic physics and an incredibly well balanced control system. The game is easy to pick up and play but it is only after playing it for some time that you start to understand the additional nuances of the controls. Initially it's just about going left or right, but later you start to use the weight of the rider to fine-tune the movement of the jetski in the corners and over the waves. I loved the fact that this game was easily accessible but had that greater depth for more hardcore players—this was a key design goal for [Colin McRae Rally]".
