= Locomotive Games =

American video game company

Locomotive Games, Inc.
- Logo as Pacific Coast Power & Light
- Formerly: Don Traeger Productions (1997–1999); Pacific Coast Power & Light (1999–2005)
- Company type: Subsidiary
- Industry: Video games
- Predecessor: Don Traeger Productions Inc.
- Founded: December 1997; 28 years ago
- Defunct: November 3, 2008
- Fate: Closed
- Headquarters: Santa Clara, California, US
- Key people: Don Traeger (CEO); Dennis Harper (CCO)
- Parent: THQ (1999–2008)

Locomotive Games, Inc. (formerly known as Pacific Coast Power & Light) was an American video game company based in Santa Clara, California. The studio was owned by THQ, the studio developed games for a variety of game machines and consoles, while also working on several of THQ's major licenses and franchises.

== History ==
The company was founded in December 1997 as Don Traeger Productions Inc. (with the trade name DT Productions) by Don Traeger (founder of EA Sports and BMG Interactive) and Dennis Harper (former executive of Atari Games). The company initially signed a deal with Sony Computer Entertainment to produce titles for PlayStation, the first of which was an action sports title. Months later, it signed a deal with THQ to develop Road Rash and Nuclear Strike for the Nintendo 64.

The company was acquired by THQ in 1999 for a total of $13 million. The studio was renamed to Locomotive Games in April 2005. The company was closed by THQ in 2008.

== List of games ==
=== As Pacific Coast Power & Light ===
Year	Title	Platform(s)
1999	Nuclear Strike	Nintendo 64
1999	Road Rash 64	Nintendo 64
1999	Jet Moto 3	PlayStation
2001	MX 2002 Featuring Ricky Carmichael	PlayStation 2
2002	MX Superfly	GameCube; PlayStation 2 Xbox
2003	WWE Crush Hour	GameCube; PlayStation 2
2004	Power Rangers Dino Thunder	GameCube; PlayStation 2

=== As Locomotive Games ===
Year	Title	Platform(s)
2006	Cars	PlayStation Portable
2007	Ratatouille	PlayStation Portable
2008	Destroy All Humans! Big Willy Unleashed	Wii
