= List of vehicular combat games =

This is a list of vehicular combat games.

== Car ==
Year	Name	Platforms	Style
2005	187 Ride or Die	PS2, Xbox	
2017	All-Star Fruit Racing	Microsoft Windows, Xbox One, PlayStation 4, Nintendo Switch	Kart racing
2006	Auto Assault	Windows	3rd person view, MMO
2011	Armageddon Riders	Windows, PS3	
2018	Asphalt 9: Legends	iOS, Android, Nintendo Switch, Xbox One, Xbox Series	Action Car Game
1985	Autoduel	Amiga, Apple II, Atari 8-bit, Atari ST, C64, MS-DOS, Macintosh	
2016	Auto Warriors	iOS	Turn-based
2002	Bandits: Phoenix Rising	Microsoft Windows, Linux	Post-apocalyptic
2017	Battle Riders	Windows, iOS	
1993	BattleWheels	Atari Lynx	Post-apocalyptic, First-person, Arena
1999	Beetle Adventure Racing	N64	
2014	BlazeRush	PS3, PS4, Nintendo Switch, Windows, MacOS, Linux	Top-down view
2010	Blood Drive	PS3, XB360	
2010	Blur	Windows, PS3, XB360	
2001	Bomberman Kart	PS2	Kart racing
2001-2018	Burnout series	Xbox, XB360, Xbox One, PS2, PS3, PS4, PSP, GameCube, Nintendo DS, Nintendo Switch, Windows, iOS	Arcade Racing
1997–2026	Carmageddon series	DOS, Windows, Mac, PS1, N64, GBA, iOS, Android	Open world, graphic violence
2006	Cartoon Network Racing	PS2, Nintendo DS	Cartoon, racing
2011	Cars 2: The Video Game	Wii, Xbox 360, PS3, Windows, Os x, PSP	
2017	Cars 3: Driven to Win	Wii U, Switch, PS3, PS4, Xbox 360, Xbox ONE	
1988	Chase H.Q.	Arcade	
2017	Crash of Cars	iOS, Android	Cartoon
2005	Crash Tag Team Racing	GameCube, PS2, PSP, Xbox	
2001, 2002	Cel Damage	GameCube, Xbox, PS2	Cartoon
2014–2019	Cel Damage HD	PlayStation 3, PlayStation 4, PlayStation Vita, Xbox One, Nintendo Switch	Cartoon
2002	Command & Conquer: Renegade	Microsoft Windows	
1993	Crash 'n Burn	3DO	
2006/2017	Crashday	Windows	
2018	The Crew 2	Microsoft Windows, Xbox One, PlayStation 4, Stadia	"Demolition Derby" (crash mode) in Freestyle motorsport family
2016	Crossout	Microsoft Windows, Xbox One, PlayStation 4	
2007	Darkwind: War on Wheels	MacOS, Windows, Linux	
1976, 1990	Death Race	Arcade	
1996–2012	Death Rally	DOS, iOS, Android	Top-down view, arcade
1989	Deathtrack	MS-DOS, DOS	
2008	Death Track: Resurrection	Windows, PlayStation 3	
2021	Destruction AllStars	PlayStation 5	
1995, 1996	Destruction Derby series	DOS, PS1, Sega Saturn, N64	
1998	DethKarz	Windows	
2021	Detonation Racing	iOS, MacOS	
2012	DiRT: Showdown	Microsoft Windows, OS X, PlayStation 3, Xbox 360	
2006	Earache: Extreme Metal Racing	PlayStation 2, Wii, PC	
1995	Fatal Racing	MS-DOS, DOS	Aka Whiplash in NA. Cross between Race Drivin, Stunts & Destruction Derby.
2012	Final Run	iOS	
1988	Fire and Forget		Post-apocalyptic combat racer
1990	Fire and Forget II	Master System, GX4000	Post-apocalyptic combat racer. Cars also fly.
2005	Fired Up	PSP	
2004–2017	FlatOut series	Windows, Xbox, XB360, PS2, PSP, Wii	
2006	Full Auto	XB360	
2006, 2007	Full Auto 2: Battlelines	PS3, PSP	
2012	Gas Guzzlers Extreme	Windows, PlayStation 4, Nintendo Switch, PlayStation 5, Xbox One	
2015	Grip: Combat Racing	Windows, PlayStation 4, Nintendo Switch, Xbox One	Inspired by Rollcage series
2000	Grudge Warriors	PS1	
2006	Hard Truck Apocalypse		Post-apocalyptic
2016	Hardware: Rivals	PS4	
1997	Have a N.I.C.E. Day!	Windows	
2009	Hot Wheels Battle Force 5	Wii, NDS	
2007	Hot Wheels: Beat That!	PlayStation 2, Xbox 360, Windows, Wii, NDS	
2021	Hot Wheels Unleashed	PlayStation 4, PlayStation 5, Switch, Xbox One, Windows, Stadia, Xbox Series X/S	
2023	Hot Wheels Unleashed 2: Turbocharged	PlayStation 4, PlayStation 5, Switch, Xbox One, Windows, Xbox Series X/S	
2002	Hot Wheels Velocity X	GameCube, PlayStation 2, PC, Game Boy Advance	
1997	Interstate '76	Windows	
1999	Interstate '82	Windows	
2005	Jak X: Combat Racing	PS2, PS4	
1989, 1990	Knight Rider	NES	
1999	Lego Racers	Windows, N64, PS1, Game Boy Color	
2001, 2002	Lego Racers 2	Windows, PS2, Game Boy Advance	
2012	LittleBigPlanet Karting	PS3	
2000	London Racer: Destruction Madness	Windows, PS2	
2000	Looney Tunes Racing	PS1, Game Boy Color	Cartoon, racing
1992	Lucky & Wild	Arcade	
2015	Mad Max	Windows, Xbox One, PlayStation 4	Post-apocalyptic
1999	Mad Trax	Microsoft Windows	
1992–2025	Mario Kart series	Super Nintendo, Nintendo 64, Game Boy Advance, GameCube, DS, Wii, 3DS, Wii U, Arcade, Switch, Switch 2, iOS/Android	Kart racing, 1st person view (Mario Kart 7)
2004-2012	Mashed series	Windows, Xbox, PS2	
1994	MegaRace	MS-DOS, Sega CD, 3DO	
1996	MegaRace 2	MS-DOS	
2002	MegaRace 3	Windows, PS2	
2018	Meow Motors	Microsoft Windows, Xbox One, PlayStation 4, Nintendo Switch	Kart racing
2010	ModNation Racers	PS3, PSP	Cartoon
2001	Motor Mayhem	PS2	
2011	MotorStorm: Apocalypse	PS3	Apocalyptic racing
2000	NASCAR Heat	Windows, Game Boy Color, PS1	
1996	Necrodome	Windows	
2005-2016	Need for Madness series	Windows, Mac, Linux	Cartoon, racing, wasting
2010	Need for Speed: Hot Pursuit	Windows, PS3, Wii, XB360, iOS, Android, webOS, Windows Phone, Java ME, PlayStation 4, Nintendo Switch, XBONE	
2013	Need for Speed: Rivals	Windows, PS3, XB360, Xbox One, PS4	
2018-2022	Nickelodeon Kart Racers series	Nintendo Switch, Xbox One, PS4	Crossover branded kart racer
2019	Nightwolf: Survive the Megadome	Windows	Synth-themed, cyber-powered vehicles
2006	Novadrome	Xbox 360	
2016	Obliteracers	Microsoft Windows, Xbox One, PlayStation 4	Cutesy combat racer on exoplanets
2022	One Hell of a Ride	Xbox One, Xbox Series, PlayStation 4, Nintendo Switch	
1992, 1993	Outlander	Sega Genesis, SNES	
2017	PAKO 2	Windows, MacOS	Overhead view, arcade
2011	Post Apocalyptic Mayhem	Windows	Post apocalypse
2005, 2006	Pursuit Force	PSP	
2007, 2008	Pursuit Force: Extreme Justice	PSP	
1994, 1995	Quarantine	3DO Interactive Multiplayer, Sega Saturn, PlayStation, MS-DOS, DOS, IBM PC compatible	Dystopian armed cab-driving
2011	Rage	Windows, PS3, XB360, MacOS	FPS game
1999, 2000	Red Dog	Dreamcast	
1999	Redline	Windows	
2011	Renegade Ops	PC, PS3, XB360	
1999	Re-Volt	Windows, N64, Dreamcast, PS1	RC cars
2012	Ridge Racer Unbounded	PlayStation 3, Xbox 360, PC	
1998	Red Asphalt	PS1	
1999	Rollcage	Windows, PlayStation	
2000	Rollcage Stage II	Windows, PlayStation	
1987	RoadBlasters	Arcade	
2003	RoadKill	PlayStation 2, Xbox, Nintendo GameCube	
1986	Roadwar 2000	Amiga, Apple II, Atari ST, Commodore 64, MS-DOS	Roguelike, Strategy video game
1987	Roadwar Europa	Amiga, Apple II, Atari ST, Commodore 64, MS-DOS	Roguelike, Strategy video game
1993	Rock n' Roll Racing	Sega Genesis, Super Nintendo, Mega Drive, Game Boy Advance, Windows	
1998	Rogue Trip: Vacation 2012		
1998	S.C.A.R.S		
2015	Scraps: Modular Vehicle Combat	Windows, MacOS, Linux	Buildable vehicles
1999, 2000	San Francisco Rush 2049	Arcade, N64, Game Boy Color, Dreamcast	
1994	Sonic Drift	Game Gear	
1995	Sonic Drift 2	Game Gear, Nintendo 3DS	
2006	Sonic Riders	Playstation 2, Xbox, Game Cube, PC	
2008	Sonic Riders Zero Gravity	Playstation 2, Wii	
2010	Sonic Free Riders	Xbox 360	
2010	Sonic & Sega All-Stars Racing	Xbox 360, PS3, Wii, Nintendo DS, PC	
2012	Sonic & All-Stars Racing Transformed	Xbox 360, PS3, PSVita, Nintendo 3DS, Wii U, PC	
2019	Team Sonic Racing	PS4, Xbox One, Nintendo Switch, PC	
2019	Sonic Racing	iOS	
2025	Sonic Racing: CrossWorlds	Switch, Switch 2, PS4, PS5, Xbox ONE, Xbox Series X/S, Windows	
2008	Speed Racer: The Videogame	PS2, Wii	
2010	Split/Second	Windows, PS3, XB360, iOS, Java ME, PSP	
1983-2012	Spy Hunter series	Arcade	
2003	Starsky & Hutch		
2016	Switchcars		
2007	Swypeout		
1997	Streets of SimCity	Windows	
2004	Test Drive: Eve of Destruction	Xbox, PS2	
1986	Turbo Esprit	ZX Spectrum, Amstrad CPC, Commodore 64	
1999	Toy Commander	Dreamcast	
1995–2012	Twisted Metal	PlayStation, PlayStation 2, PlayStation 3, PlayStation Portable	
1999	Vigilante 8: 2nd Offense	PlayStation, Dreamcast, Nintendo 64	
1998	Vigilante 8	PlayStation, Nintendo 64	
2007	Vigilante 8 Arcade		
1985	Violent Run (Gekisou)	Arcade	
2000	Wacky Races	Dreamcast, PS2	Cartoon, racing
2018	Warped Kart Racers	iOS, MacOS	Kart racer with crossovers from cheap cartoon shows.
2003	WWE Crush Hour		
2009	Wheelman	Windows, PS3, XB360	
2012	Wheels of Destruction	PS3	Arena, Teams, Online Multiplayer
2018	Wreckfest	PC	
2009	Zombie Driver	Windows, PS3, XB360, Android	
2026	Screamer	Windows, PS5, Xbox Series X/S	

== Futuristic racing ==
Note: Also covers Anti-gravity combat racing games.

- Fire and Forget (1988)
  - Fire and Forget II (1990)
- Deathtrack (1989)
- S.T.U.N. Runner (1989)
- F-Zero series (1990 debut)
- Battle Cars (1993)
- Hi-Octane (1995)
- Wipeout series (1995 debut)
- Assault Rigs (1996)
- HoverRace (1996)
- Jet Moto series (1996 debut)
- DethKarz (1998)
- Psybadek (1998)
- Hover Ace (2001)
- Quantum Redshift (2002)
- Fatal Inertia (2007)
- Death Track: Resurrection (2008)
- Radial-G series (2015-2019)
- BallisticNG (2018)
- Pacer (video game) (2020)

== Aircraft ==
- Ace Combat (series)
- Airfix Dogfighter
- Altitude
- DCS World
- Diddy Kong Racing
- IL-2 Sturmovik (series)
- M.A.C.H.
- Mach Storm
- Plane Crazy
- SkyDrift
- Slipstream 5000
- Sonic & All-Stars Racing Transformed
- War Thunder
- World of Warplanes

== Boat, ship and submarine ==
Naval-focused and themed sims.

- AquaNox series
- Blood Wake
- Cobra Triangle
- Cold Waters
- Critical Depth
- Dead In The Water
- Microcosm
- PT Boats series (Akella's)
- Silent Hunter series
- Silent Service and Silent Service II
- TigerShark
- War Thunder
- Wave Race series
- World of Warships

== Tank ==
- Alien Front Online, the primary good forces are tanks and the secondary alien forces are played as mechs
- Arcticfox
- Armored Warfare
- BattleTanx series
- Borderline (Thunderground)
- BZFlag, a FOSS Battlezone-like game
- Combat, the original 1977 founder of the genre
- Front Line
- Gunmetal
- Hovertank 3D
- Iron Warriors: T-72 Tank Commander
- iPanzer '44
- IL-2 Sturmovik: Tank Crew
- M1 Tank Platoon
- M1 Tank Platoon II
- Metal Drift
- Metal Max series, a tank combat and role-playing video game combination
- Nova 9
- Panzer Commander
- Panzer Front
- Panzer Elite
- Pop'n Tanks!
- Red Orchestra: Ostfront 41-45
- Recoil
- Spearhead (video game)
- Spectre VR
- Steel Armor: Blaze of War
- Steel Beasts
- Steel Fury
- Stellar 7
- Tanarus
- Tank
- Tanki Online
- Tank Universal
- Tank! Tank! Tank!
- Tank Troopers
- Team Yankee
- Thunder Brigade
- Tiny Tank: Up Your Arsenal
- TNK III (T.A.N.K.)
- Tread Marks
- War Rock
- War Thunder
- Wild Metal
- World of Tanks
- World War II Online, a tank, gun, infantry, plane, ship, simulation, MMO, FPS and real-time strategy combination

=== Futuristic tank sims ===
Note: Focuses mainly on hover tanks or vehicles (i.e. floats in air above ground)

- Battlezone, original arcade game and home conversions
- Battlezone and Battlezone II: Combat Commander, although most of the tanks have anti-gravity engines instead of tracks
- Cyber Sled
  - Cyber Commando

== Motorcycle ==
- A.B. Cop
- Cycle Warriors
- DeathDrome
- Extreme-G series
- Final Fantasy VII (G Bike)
- Final Fantasy VII G-Bike
- Mach Rider
- Mad Crasher
- Road Rage
- Road Rash series
- Road Redemption
- Seicross
- Grand Theft Auto series

== Space vehicle ==
- Astron Belt
- A/X-101
- Battlestar Galactica (2003 game)
- The Cosmic Balance series
- Colony Wars series
  - Blast Radius
- Descent (series)
- EVE Online
- Freespace series
- Freelancer
- Lunar Rescue
- Moon Patrol
- Project Sylpheed
- Space Encounters
- Space Seeker
- Star Citizen
- Star Trek
- Star Wars: Demolition
- Star Wars: X-Wing
- Star Wars: Rebel Assault series
- Star Wars: Starfighter series
- Tac/Scan
- X
- Starlancer
- Star Trek: Bridge Commander
- Wing Commander (franchise)

== Multi-vehicular ==
(List of games in which players use more than one vehicle type during gameplay)

- Armed Assault series
- Armour-Geddon series
- Banjo-Kazooie: Nuts & Bolts (2008)
- Battlefield series
- Body Harvest (1998)
- Borderlands series
- Battlestations series
- Command & Conquer: Renegade (2002)
- Darkwind: War on Wheels (2007)
- Deadly Dozen series
- Delta Force: Xtreme 2 (2009)
- Diddy Kong Racing (1997)
- Diddy Kong Racing DS (2005)
- Enemy Territory: Quake Wars (2007)
- Extreme Assault (1997)
- Frontlines: Fuel of War (2008)
- G-Police: Weapons of Justice (1999)
- Grand Theft Auto series
- Halo series
- Hidden & Dangerous series
- Homefront (2011)
- Incoming (1998 video game) (1998)
- Incoming Forces (2002)
- Jeff Wayne's The War of the Worlds (1999)
- Just Cause series
- Mario Kart 8 / Mario Kart 8 Deluxe (2014-2017)
- Mario Kart Wii (2008)
- Mario Kart World (2025)
- Mercenaries series
- Need for Madness series
- Onrush
- Operation Flashpoint series
- PlanetSide (2003)
- PlanetSide Arena (2019)
- PlanetSide 2 (2012)
- Rage 2 (2019)
- RecWar (2002)
- Red Faction series
- Saints Row series
- Scarface (2006)
- Sonic & All-Stars Racing Transformed (2012)
- Star Wars: Battlefront series
- Stealth Combat: Ultimate War (2002)
- Switchcars (2016)
- The Saboteur (2009)
- Thorium Wars series
- Tribes series
- Unreal Tournament 2004 (2004)
- Unreal Tournament 3 (2007)
- War Thunder (2013)

== Mecha ==
This subgenre of vehicular combat involves mech robots, or mecha, as the vehicle for combat. For most mech games, they are played in either first-person or third-person view style. Other games are based on popular Anime television shows such as the various Gundam series, Robotech, and Evangelion. Also, games with a mech theme are featured in RPG games such as Xenosaga and the Front Mission series.

- Another Century's Episode series
- Armored Core series
- Assault Suits series
- Battle Engine Aquila
- Nintendo's Battle Clash/Metal Combat: Falcon's Revenge
- Border Break
- Nintendo's Custom Robo series
- Chromehounds
- Cruise Chaser Blassty
- Cyberbots: Full Metal Madness
- Cybernator
- Daemon X Machina
- Earthsiege
- Eureka 7 video games
- Exteel
- Front Mission series, a tactical RPG mecha series
- Ghen War
- Ghost in the Shell
- G-Nome
- Gungriffon series
- Gun Metal
- Hawken
- Heavy Gear series
- Hover Attack
  - Bangai-O series
- IGPX Immortal Grand Prix video games
- Kagirinaki Tatakai
- Krazy Ivan
- Nintendo and Levels-5's Little Battlers Experience
- The Super Dimension Fortress Macross video games
- MechAssault series
- MechWarrior series
- MechCommander series
- Metal Fatigue
- Metal Head
- Metal Marines
- Metal Storm
- Metal Warriors
- Mobile Suit Gundam video games
  - Mobile Suit Gundam: Last Shooting, a first-person perspective shooter
  - Mobile Suit Z-Gundam: Hot Scramble, a first-person shooter
- Neon Genesis Evangelion video games
- Nimbus series
- One Must Fall 2097
- Patlabor
- Perpetuum
- Phantom Crash
- Robocraft
- Robot Alchemic Drive
- Robotech video games
- Senko no Ronde
- S.L.A.I.: Steel Lancer Arena International
- Slave Zero
- Shattered Steel
- Shogo: Mobile Armor Division
- Star Cruiser, a first-person shooter action RPG
- Starsiege
- Steambot Chronicles
- Steel Battalion
- Steel Battalion: Line of Contact
- Super Robot Wars series
- Tail Concerto
- Titanfall
- Thexder series
- Transformers video games
- Vanguard Bandits
- Vastar
- Virtual On
- WiBArm, a third-person action RPG shooter
- Xenogears
  - Xenosaga series
- Zone of the Enders series

== Kart racers with battle modes ==
Battle modes for kart racing games are deathmatch battles influenced by the characters, go-karts and weapons used in the mode. The Mario Kart series demonstrates this kind of mode in its previous installments.

=== Mario Kart series ===
- Super Mario Kart
- Mario Kart 64
- Mario Kart: Super Circuit
- Mario Kart: Double Dash
- Mario Kart DS
- Mario Kart Wii
- Mario Kart 7
- Mario Kart 8
  - Mario Kart 8 Deluxe
- Mario Kart Tour
- Mario Kart World

=== Crash kart series ===
- Crash Team Racing
- Crash Nitro Kart
- Crash Tag Team Racing
- Crash Team Racing Nitro-Fueled

=== Other kart racers with battle modes ===
- Bomberman Kart
- Cartoon Network Racing
- Cel Damage
- Charinko Hero
- Cocoto Kart Racer
- Diddy Kong Racing
- Diddy Kong Racing DS
- DreamWorks Super Star Kartz
- Freaky Flyers
- Garfield Kart
- Jak X: Combat Racing
- KartRider: Drift
- LittleBigPlanet Karting
- Looney Tunes Racing
- Moorhuhn Kart 3
- Muppet RaceMania
- Nickelodeon Kart Racers 2: Grand Prix
- Nickelodeon Kart Racers 3: Slime Speedway
- Pac-Man World Rally
- R.C. Pro-Am
- Shrek Smash n' Crash Racing
- Sonic & All-Stars Racing Transformed
- Sonic & Sega All-Stars Racing
- Speed Punks
- SuperTuxKart
- Team Sonic Racing
- Wacky Races
- Wacky Wheels
- Walt Disney World Quest: Magical Racing Tour
- Woody Woodpecker Racing
