= Armored Hunter Gunhound EX =

2013 video game

- Developer: Dracue
- Publisher: Playism
- Directors: Hiroki Tomino, Hiroyuki Maruyama
- Programmer: Hiroshi Iso
- Artists: Noi Momoyama, Tōru Yoshida
- Writer: Zero Kisaragi
- Platforms: PlayStation Portable; Windows
- Release: PSP: January 31, 2013; Windows: May 1, 2014
- Genre: Mecha

Armored Hunter Gunhound EX (Note: Japanese: 機装猟兵ガンハウンドEX, Hepburn: Kisou Ryouhei Gunhound EX) is a Japanese video game developed by Dracue for the PlayStation Portable. It was originally released in 2013 for the PlayStation Portable and later ported to Windows in 2014 and given a release outside of Japan. The game started originally as a doujin game, and is a mecha action game.

== Story ==
The story is set in the far future, where warfare is fought with giant mecha. The story involves a pilot of one of these machines, fighting in a war.

== Gameplay ==
The game is a 2D action game, and features the player taking control of a large humanoid mecha.

The game is a tribute to and plays similarly to Assault Suit Leynos, and Assault Suit Valken.

== Development ==
The game was originally a Japanese doujin (independent) game.

Norihiro Furukawa worked on arrangements for the main theme of the game.

The game was released for the PlayStation Portable in Japan on January 13, 2013.

The soundtrack for the game titled PERFECT SOUNDTRACK Kisou Ryouhei Gunhound EX was released as a bonus with purchase of the limited edition of the PSP release.

Dracue software closed, and president Tomino Yuki left to join the company Garuru Labs. The original source code for Gunhound was made open source. Due to the suspension of Dracue software, the game was removed from the Steam and Playism stores on October 18, 2018.

== Reception ==
Reception

Review scores
| Publication | Score |
|---|---|
| Famitsu | 29/40 |
| USgamer | 4/5 |
| CD-Action | 7.5/10 |
| M!Games | 76 /100 |

The game was well received upon release. Several reviewers compared the game to Assault Suit Valken.

Four reviewers in Famitsu gave the PSP version a score of 8/7/7/7 for a total of 29/40.

The EX version released for PC was equally well received. USGamer gave it a score of 4/5. Polish gaming magazine CD-Action gave the game a score of 7.5/10. Though overall positive, they noted that the ideas in the game weren't implemented to the extent that they could have been, and that they wished that a sequel could expand upon these ideas.

== See also ==
- Metal Warriors
- Front Mission: Gun Hazard
