= Garbage Man =

Garbage Man may refer to:

- a waste collector, a person who goes to houses and businesses to collect waste and take it to a landfill, incinerator, or waste facility
- "Garbage Man," a song by G. Love and Special Sauce from their 1994 album G. Love and Special Sauce
- Alias of Y the Alien in Vigilante 8 and Vigilante 8: Second Offense
- "Garbageman," a song by The Cramps off their 1980 album, Songs The Lord Taught Us
- "Garbadge Man," a song by Hole from their 1991 album Pretty On The Inside
- "Garbage Man," a Swamp Thing-style DC Comics character featured in the anthology mini-series Weird Worlds and My Greatest Adventure
