= Assault Suit Leynos =

Assault Suit Leynos may refer to:

- Target Earth (video game), a 1990 video game originally named Assault Suit Leynos in Japan
- Assault Suit Leynos (2015 video game), a remake of the former
