= Assault Suit Leynos 2 =

1997 video game

- Japanese cover of the Saturn version
- Developers: NCS (Original); City Connection (Re-release)
- Publishers: Masaya Games (Original); City Connection (Re-release)
- Platforms: Sega Saturn; Nintendo Switch; PlayStation 4 PlayStation 5 Windows; Xbox One
- Release: Sega Saturn: JP: February 21, 1997; Nintendo Switch; PlayStation 4 PlayStation 5 Windows & Xbox One: WW: April 24, 2024
- Genre: Run and gun
- Mode: Single-player

Assault Suit Leynos 2 (Note: Japanese: 重装機兵レイノス2, Hepburn: Jūsō Kihei Reinosu 2) is a 1997 Japanese run and gun video game developed by NCS for the Sega Saturn. It is a direct sequel to Target Earth for the Sega Genesis, and is the third title in the Assault Suit series. It is a side-scrolling mecha shooting game set in the future. A re-release of the game was announced by City Connection in September 2023, as part of its Saturn Tribute label. It was re-released on April 25, 2024, for Nintendo Switch, PlayStation 4, PlayStation 5, Xbox One and PC. New features exclusive to this re-release are a new translation of the game script in English plus device and weapon databases.

== Gameplay ==
Much like the original game, Leynos 2 is a 2D mecha action game. The player's mech comes equipped with a jet-boost, a dash, and a shield, which were upgrades that had to be earned in the original game. Customization can be done before each battle, equipping various items earned through the game. There are 50 weapons in total available in the game, as well as options to change the speed, maneuverability, and protective shields of the mech. There are special upgrade devices that alter various characteristics of the player's mech, such as aiming and a radar system. The game features a camera that zooms in and out to show less or more detail on screen. The zoom range is determined by the range of the currently equipped weapon.

== Development and release ==
Assault Suit Leynos 2 followed the games Target Earth for the Genesis and Assault Suits Valken (Cybernator in North America, Europe, and Australia) for the Super NES. It was developed by NCS and Masaya Games. It was released exclusively in Japan on February 21, 1997, for the Sega Saturn.

In a January 1996 interview with Saturn Fan, NCS planner Kengo Miyata explained that the developers had considered using polygonal graphics for Assault Suit Leynos 2, but ultimately chose a two-dimensional presentation to take advantage of the Sega Saturn's background and sprite capabilities. The team sought to preserve the series' action-oriented gameplay while increasing the variety of playable machines and their available equipment.

== Reception ==
Reception

Review scores
Publication	Score
Famitsu	25/40
GameFan	82.6
GameSpot	7.3/10
IGN	8.0/10
Consoles +	88%
Next Generation	3/5
Saturn Power	75/100
Sega Saturn Magazine (JP)	7/10
Game Power	88/100
MAN!AC	73%

The game received generally positive review scores from critics. Next Generation magazine gave the game 3 out of 5 stars. Reviewers for Famitsu gave it 25 out of 40. Three reviewers from GameFan gave the game scores of 80, 85, and 83 for an average of 82.6. IGN gave it an 8 out of 10. GameSpot gave it a 7.3 out of 10. Consoles Plus gave the game 88. Saturn Power gave it a score of 75. The Japanese magazine Sega Saturn Magazine gave it a score of 7/10. German magazine Maniac scored it well.
