= Vehicular combat =

Vehicular combat may refer to:

- Armored warfare, the use of armored fighting vehicles in combat
  - Combat vehicle, a military vehicle designed for such combat
- Vehicular combat game, a game genre focused around fighting while driving
  - List of vehicular combat games, a list of such games
- Demolition derby, a motorsport revolving around ramming vehicles into one another
