= Assault Suit =

- Genres: Mecha, shoot 'em up, strategy
- Developers: Masaya Games, Dracue
- Publishers: NCS, DreamWorks, Konami, EXTREME Co., Ltd, Rising Star Games
- Platforms: Sega Genesis, SNES, Sega Saturn, PlayStation, PlayStation 2, PlayStation 4, Windows
- First release: Assault Suit Leynos; 1990
- Latest release: Assault Suit Leynos; 2015

Assault Suit, also known as Assault Suits, is a series of futuristic robotic war video games developed by NCS featuring soldiers manning the eponymous gigantic humanoid mecha. Spanning the course of 15 years and beyond, the games were cross-distributed, cross-published and developed between the U.S. and Japan. It is known as one of the most challenging series to follow due to the drastic changes from game to game.

== Releases ==
Japan name	US name	EU name	Release dates	Game system	Developer	JP publisher	US publisher	EU publisher
Assault Suit Leynos	Target Earth	N/A	JP March 16, 1990 / US 1990 / no EU release	Sega Genesis	NCS	Masaya	DreamWorks	N/A
Assault Suits Valken	Cybernator	Cybernator	JP Dec 18, 1992 / US April 1993 / EU 1993	SNES	NCS	Masaya	Konami	Palcom
Assault Suit Leynos 2	N/A	N/A	JP February 17, 1997 / no US release / no EU release	Sega Saturn	NCS	Masaya	N/A	N/A
Assault Suits Valken 2	N/A	N/A	JP July 26, 1999 / no US release / no EU release	PlayStation	NCS	Masaya	N/A	N/A
Assault Suits Valken	N/A	Assault Suits Valken	JP August 26, 2004 / no US release / EU June 2005	PlayStation 2	Soft Action; X-Nauts	X-Nauts	N/A	505 Game Street
Assault Suit Leynos	Assault Suit Leynos	Assault Suit Leynos	JP December 23, 2015 / US July 12, 2016	PlayStation 4, Windows	Dracue Software	EXTREME Co., Ltd	Rising Star Games	Rising Star Games
Assault Suits Valken DECLASSIFIED	Assault Suits Valken DECLASSIFIED	Assault Suits Valken DECLASSIFIED	March 30, 2023	Nintendo Switch	M2 Co., Ltd.	Rainmaker Productions	Rainmaker Productions	Rainmaker Productions
Assault Suit Leynos 2 Saturn Tribute	Assault Suit Leynos 2 Saturn Tribute	Assault Suit Leynos 2 Saturn Tribute	Apr 24, 2024	Windows	CITY CONNECTION	CITY CONNECTION	CITY CONNECTION	CITY CONNECTION

== The series ==
=== Assault Suit Leynos (Target Earth) ===
Assault Suit Leynos, released in North America as Target Earth, is the first game in the series. It was released for the Sega Genesis.

One scene, where a comrade who doesn't make it back to the ship burns up in the atmosphere, was removed from the North American version.

=== Assault Suits Valken (Cybernator) ===
The success of the first Assault Suits game in Japan would spawn another game on the Super Famicom. The artwork style, assault armor concepts, as well as the dialogue engine would remain similar to that of Target Earth/Assault Suits Leynos, but with major graphical improvements. The US name Cybernator added confusion to American gamers and disconnected many of the fans from the Target Earth roots. This game was actually a prequel to Assault Suit Leynos, taking place nearly a decade before.

Cybernator was the subject of censorship during its localization. The Japanese version featured written dialog accompanied by a portrait of the speaker, but for some reason, these portraits were removed during localization. There was also a scene absent in which the president of the enemy forces, after realizing that his nation has been defeated, commits suicide. It is unknown whether Konami or Nintendo took action on these censorships.

An enhanced remake was released for the PS2 in 2004.

An updated version of the original called Assault Suits Valken Declassified was released for the Nintendo Switch in 2023.

=== Assault Suit Leynos 2 ===
Assault Suit Leynos 2 arrived on the Sega Saturn as the true sequel to Assault Suit Leynos, but was released only in Japan.

In September 2023, City Connection announced a re-release of the game as part of the Saturn Tribute label.

=== Assault Suits Valken 2 ===
The sequel to the SNES title in the series was released on the PlayStation. It differed from the rest of the series, as it was a strategy/RPG, unlike the rest, all being action/shooter/platform titles. After the release in 1999, the same game would be reprinted by the company Four Winds on August 30, 2001. This game was never released outside Japan either.

=== Assault Suit Leynos ===
A remake of Assault Suit Leynos was released for the PlayStation 4 and Microsoft Windows by Gunhound EX developer Dracue Software. Originally set to launch in late 2014 or early 2015, the game was delayed to December 2015 to allow the team to implement a cooperative mode as well as multiple endings. It finally released on July 12, 2016.

Famitsu gave it a 26 out of 40 score.

== See also ==
- Armored Core
- Front Mission
- Heavy Gear
- Metal Warriors
