= Arcade Gamer Fubuki =

Manga and anime series

- Cover of the manga's 2002 rerelease

アーケードゲーマーふぶき (Ākēdo Gēmā Fubuki)
- Manga
- Written by: Mine Yoshizaki
- Published by: Enterbrain
- Magazine: Monthly Famitsu Wave; Famitsu Bros.
- Original run: 1998 – 2002
- Volumes: 6
- Original video animation
- Directed by: Yūji Mutō
- Produced by: Jun Yukawa (Bandai Visual); Nobuhiro Ōsawa (Genco)
- Written by: Ryōta Yamaguchi
- Music by: Ryūichi Katsumata
- Studio: Shaft
- Released: February 25, 2002 – January 25, 2003
- Episodes: 4
- Original video animation

Special
- Directed by: Mine Yoshizaki
- Produced by: Jun Yukawa (Bandai Visual); Nobuhiro Ōsawa (Genco)
- Written by: Mine Yoshizaki
- Music by: Ryūichi Katsumata
- Studio: Shaft
- Released: March 28, 2003
- Runtime: 6 minutes
- icon

Arcade Gamer Fubuki (Japanese: アーケードゲーマーふぶき, Hepburn: Ākēdo Gēmā Fubuki) is a Japanese manga series by Mine Yoshizaki. It was adapted into an anime series animated by Shaft and released directly on video. The first episode aired on television prior to the release of the first video. The series was licensed in English by Central Park Media, distributed under the U.S. Manga Corps label.

The series is set in 1984 and stars Fubuki Sakuragasaki, a gamer whose "passion panties" give her special gaming powers. She has a winged magical girl form, and she has a sword while in this form. The series has homages to Pac-Man, Virtua Fighter, and other games like Sonic the Hedgehog and Klonoa.

== Characters ==
Fubuki Sakuragasaki (桜ヶ咲ふぶき（さくらがさき ふぶき）, Sakuragasaki Fubuki)
A ordinary middle school girl with poor athletic ability but excels in video games, she had become inspired for gaming after receiving a pair of white underwear (Passion Panties) from Arashi at a young age.
Hanako Kokobunji (国分寺花子（こくぶんじ はなこ）, Kokubunji Hanako)
Daughter of Masao, and Fubuki's friend and Game Middle School classmate. She first met Fubuki when Fubuki was playing a New Uma Catcher claw catcher game outside ARASHI arcade.
Sanpeita (三平太（さんぺいた）, Sanpeita)
A boy who stalks Fubuki to shoot her panty shots, but does not take interest in panty shots of others. He is often seen hiding in a vaulting box.
Ruriko Sakuragasaki (桜ヶ咲ルリ子, Sakuragasaki Ruriko)/Fubuki's mother (ふぶきの母)
Fubuki's mother.
Arashi Ishino (石野あらし, Ishino Arashi)
The buck-toothed lead character from Game Center Arashi. After resurrecting Fubuki's father and discovering his plan of world domination, he ran off with the white Passion Panty that would later be given to Fubuki.
Mr. Mystery (謎の人, Nazo no Hito)/Seed
A man wearing pink Pac-Man ghost mask, and the champion of the previous World BAG Tournament. In the 2nd World BAG Tournament, he faced Fubuki as final opponent in a Moon Cresta game, but the match was interrupted, leading to him joining Fubuki to play cooperatively in X. In the bonus stage of X, he was defeated by Mister 20. After the tournament ended, he wears the same mask with a number '2' on it.
Masao Kokobunji (国分寺マサオ（こくぶんじ マサオ）, Kokobunji Masao)
Hanako's father, and KOGC Co., Ltd. founder and president.
Layla Rurilan (瑠璃蘭れいら, Ruriran Reira)
A semi-finallist in the restarted Japan BAG Tournament that was defeated by Fubuki in Virtua Fighter (Remix?). In World BAG Tournament, she traded place with Raptor while wearing a costume resembling it. Only after losing to Fubuki in Fighting Vipers 2 that others realized the switch.
Glass Joe (グラスジョー, Glass Joe)/Joe Dallas
Fubuki's opponent in the final match of Tokyo BAG Tournament, specializing in boxing technique to manipulate game controller. He was defeated by Fubuki in Crazy Climber.
Nicponski
World BAG Tournament finalist from Armenia, wearing a grey trenchcoat, a white scarf, a black hat with white trim, glasses with swirl pattern.
Chadale
World BAG Tournament finalist from India, wearing yellow suit, a yellow pointed hat, white shoes.
Queen Cobra
World BAG Tournament finalist from Egypt, wearing a pink scarf, a black bra, a yellow tiara, a yellow skirt with black spots.
Un Yong Kim
World BAG Tournament finalist from South, wearing white suit with blue rim shirt, a purple belt.
Ro Fukuda (福田朗, Fukuda Rō)
BAG Tournament's commentator.
Referee (レフェリー)
BAG Tournament's referee.
Poker
United Nations' secretary general.

=== Gyulassic Group/Gulassic Group ===
Miss Alka (Miss（ミス）アルカ, Misu Aruka)
An executive from Group. She leads Zakko minions in missions.
Chizuru Jyumonji (十文字ちづる, Jūmonji Chizuru)/Shooter Chizuru (シューターちづる, Shooter Chizuru)
The first lord from the Group specializing in shooter games from Osaka, and the wearer of black Passion Panty. She joined the Group in exchange for the arcade version of Tranquilizer Gun for the game centre Dig manager in Hell's River that had sold it to pay for debts, but Alka broke the promise. She first meet Fubuki in Game Middle School and joined the school as transfer student. After defeating Fubuki in Japan BAG Tournament final in Fantasy Zone, she was defeated by Fubuki in the restarted Japan final in the same game. Following the loss, Hanako sent the rare game to Chizuru. She is often seen wearing Pooka (from Dig Dug) goggles and roller skates.
Melody Honey (メロディー・ハニー, Merodī Hanī)
The second lord from the Group from USA, specializing in dancing games. She first appeared in a game centre in KOGC Hotel in Hell's River playing Dancing evolution 2nd dancing game. In the World BAG Tournament final, she lost to Fubuki in Virtua Fighter 4.
Zakko Lv.I (ザッコーLv.I)
A red-suited masked minion.
Zakko Lv.II (ザッコーLv.II)
A purple-suited masked minion.
Zakko Lv.III (ザッコーLv.III)
A green-suited masked minion.
Raptor
The third lord from the Group, it is a velociraptor created using the DNA extracted from a blood-sucking bee trapped in amber. In the World BAG Tournament final, it traded places with Leila Rurilan while resting. As the tournament entered final phase, it became Leila's pet after being fed with leftover lunch.
Mister 20
The fourth lord from the Group, and the final boss in the bonus stage in X, a game designed by Fubuki's father, which he also played as in the game. Following Mr. Mystery's defeat in X, players across the world connect to X's network, slowing down his processing speed, and was subsequently defeated by Fubuki.
Gyulassic Leader (ギュラシック団首領, Gyurashikku-dan shuryō)/Leader
The mysterious leader of the group, and Fubuki's father. Originally working for KOGC Co. Ltd. to develop video games, he quit the job after witnessing a fight in a KOGC Co. Ltd. Game Garden game centre with gamers reenacting Mach Fist in a fighting video game, followed by seeing a news report of KOGC-developed processors being used to power missiles to kill people. During a journey to stop a missile attack, his body was injured by the missile explosion, but was revived by Arashi and his mind was transferred to a machine. After Fubuki's meeting with the Leader, he decided to go on another journey to the vast seas, leaving Fubuki to Ruriko's care.

== Anime ==
Arcade Gamer Fubuki was directed by Yūji Mutō at Shaft, was written by Ryōta Yamaguchi, has animation character designs by Hideyuki Morioka, and features music composed by Ryūichi Katsumata. Mutō wrote the scripts for all of the episodes with the exception of the special, which was written by the manga's creator: Mine Yoshizaki. Two episodes were produced with assistance from other studios: episode 2 at A.C.G.T, and episode 3 at M.S.C.

=== Cast ===
Character	Japanese	English
Fubuki Sakuragasaki (桜ヶ咲ふぶき, Sakuragasaki Fubuki)	Sakura Nogawa	Veronica Taylor
Hanako Kokobunji (国分寺花子, Kokubunji Hanako)	Kaori Shimizu	Jessica Calvello
Chizuru Jyumonji (十文字ちづる, Jūmonji Chizuru)	Yū Asakawa	Lisa Ortiz
Miss Alka (ミス・アルカ, Misu Aruka)	Satsuki Yukino	Sharon Becker
Melody Honey (メロディー・ハニー, Merodī Hanī)	Megumi Toyoguchi	Shannon Conley
Sanpeita (三平太, Sanpeita)	Masaki Yamamoto	Jamie McGonnigal
Mr. Mystery (謎の人, Nazo no Hito)	Tōru Furuya	Brad Bradford
Arashi Ishino (石野あらし, Ishino Arashi)	Shinnosuke Furumoto	Brad Bradford
Gulassic Leader (ギュラシック団首領, Gyurashikku-dan shuryō)	Hiroshi Fujioka	Dan Green
MC	Yasunori Matsumoto	Tom Wayland
Referee (レフェリー, Referī)	Takashi Matsuyama	Eric Laing
Masao	Shinpachi Tsuji	Bob Orlikoff
Ruriko Sakuragasaki (桜ヶ咲ルリ子, Sakuragasaki Ruriko)	Michiko Neya	Rebecca Honig
Narrator	Kōji Yusa	Dan Green

=== Episode list ===
No.	Title	Directed by (Note: Information is taken from the ending credits of each episode.)	Storyboarded by	Animation director	Original release date
1	"Fubuki Bakutan"; Transliteration: "Fubuki Bakutan" (Japanese: ふぶき爆誕)	Toshinori Narita	Yūji Mutō	Hideyuki Morioka; Yoshiaki Itou; Takehiro Hamatsu	February 25, 2002
2	"Stolen Passion Panty"; Transliteration: "Nusumareta PP" (Japanese: 盗まれたPP)	Toshinori Narita	Yūji Mutō	Hideyuki Morioka (chief); Masahiro Andou	April 25, 2002
3	"Final Game! My Dad Is an Emperor!?"; Transliteration: "Kesshou! Otou-chan wa Teiou!?" (Japanese: 決勝! 父ちゃんは帝王!?)	Itsurou Kawasaki	Akihiro Enomoto	Hideyuki Morioka (chief); Kanami Sekiguchi	August 25, 2002
4	"A Reunion That Transcends Time"; Transliteration: "Jikuu wo Koeta Souguu" (Japanese: 時空を越えた遭遇)	Yūji Mutō; Toshimasa Suzuki	Yūji Mutō	Hideyuki Morioka; Yoshiaki Itou; Yuuichi Nakazawa	January 25, 2003
Special	"Paradise Beyond the Wall"; Transliteration: "Kabe no Mukou no Paradise" (Japanese: カベノ ムコウノ パラダイス)	Hideyuki Morioka	Mine Yoshizaki	Hideyuki Morioka	March 28, 2003

== Reception ==
Jonathan Clements and Helen McCarthy, authors of The Anime Encyclopedia, Revised & Expanded Edition: A Guide to Japanese Animation Since 1917, stated that the series began as a gag anime but became "a preachy family fable too long-winded to sustain its jokes". Clements and McCarthy wrote that the series "inherits the mantle of Game Center Arashi".
