= Zombie Driver =

2009 video game

- Developer: Exor Studios
- Publisher: Exor Studios
- Engine: Ogre3D; PhysX
- Platforms: Microsoft Windows; PlayStation 3 Xbox 360; Android (Tegra based devices); Ouya; Xbox One; PlayStation 4 Nintendo Switch
- Release: Android: WW: December 4, 2009; Xbox 360: WW: October 17, 2012; Microsoft Windows: NA: October 17, 2012; PlayStation 3 (HD): NA: December 18, 2012; PAL: January 23, 2013; JP: February 19, 2013; Ouya (HD): NA: August 23, 2013; Xbox One (Ultimate Edition): NA: June 24, 2014; PAL: July 1, 2014; (Immortal Edition) Nintendo Switch: WW: July 25, 2019; PlayStation 4: WW: August 14, 2020
- Genre: Vehicular combat
- Mode: Single-player

Zombie Driver is a vehicular combat video game. Set in a zombie apocalypse environment, a chemical accident/secret government project has turned the inhabitants of a city into shambling, aggressive opponents. The player must undertake various missions to rescue stranded civilians, slaughter zombies and unlock/upgrade various vehicles.

It was later released as Zombie Driver HD on the Xbox 360, PlayStation 3 and Ouya game consoles and Steam, and on Xbox One as Zombie Driver: Ultimate Edition. A Nintendo Switch version was released as Zombie Driver: Immortal Edition. A PlayStation 4 version of the same name was released on August 14, 2020.

== Reception ==
Zombie Driver received average reviews upon release. Critics noted the game for its repetitiveness, untapped potential, and length. "Good fun until the novelty wears off. Which doesn't take that long, sadly." reviewed Total PC Gaming. The game has a Metacritic score of 60 and a user score of 6.2.

Zombie Driver HD received similar middling reviews upon its release for the first time on consoles. The game has a Metacritic score of 62/100 and a user score of 5.1/10 on the Xbox 360 platform. The steam version holds a 'very positive' user rating from over 2,514 reviews.

Zombie Driver: Immortal Edition reviewed well on its Nintendo Switch release in 2019. Switch Player commended the game for its longevity; "this petrol-fueled indie hit has aged extremely well, delivering a healthy mix of speed, blood and apocalyptic destruction." and favorably calling it a "tour de force of vehicular undead destruction."

== See also ==
- List of vehicular combat games
