= Star Wars: Demolition =

2000 video game

- North American Dreamcast box art
- Developer: Luxoflux
- Publishers: NA: LucasArts; PAL: LucasArts/Activision
- Designers: Adrian Stephens; Peter Moraweic; Cary Hara; Edvard Toth; David Goodrich; Justin Rasch; Micah A. Linton; Trong Khang Pham
- Writer: Haden Blackman
- Composer: David Levison
- Series: Star Wars
- Engine: Vigilante 8
- Platforms: PlayStation, Dreamcast
- Release: NA: November 16, 2000 (PS); NA: November 20, 2000 (DC); EU: December 15, 2000
- Genre: Vehicular combat
- Modes: Single-player, multiplayer

Star Wars: Demolition is a 2000 vehicular combat game developed by Luxoflux and published by LucasArts for the PlayStation and Dreamcast. It is set in the Star Wars universe, where the Galactic Empire has banned Jabba the Hutt's podraces, so Jabba creates a more life-threatening vehicular combat contest.

The game received mixed reviews upon release. Critics felt that while the game was fun in short bursts it lost its appeal with extended gameplay.

== Gameplay ==
Star Wars: Demolition features familiar Star Wars characters and locales in a vehicular combat competition.

Star Wars: Demolition is a vehicular combat game set in the Star Wars universe. The objective is to be the last vehicle standing by destroying all other combatants. Several powerups can be found on the battlefield which enhance a player's vehicle. These include weaponry, such as thermal detonators, concussion missiles and proton torpedoes, and boost items, which include additional shielding, cloaking, and increasing the fire rate of weapons. Eight playable stages and 13 combatants are included in the game.

Four game modes are offered to players. In Tournament mode players compete in successively harder rounds at a given location. The first round has one enemy combatant, the second has two, and so on. Here players can unlock new characters by completing the mode with at least 10,000 points. Battle Mode is a free-for-all in which players can practice their skills. High Stakes mode adds a gambling aspect to gameplay. Prior to the round start players are given their odds of winning, a bet is then placed, and the player either receives a payout or has credits deducted based on whether they win or lose. Finally, Hunt-a-Droid mode provides only roaming Imperial probe droids to shoot for target practice and is limited to three minutes. Each mode can be played with one or two players on the PlayStation, while the Dreamcast version supports up to four players.

== Setting ==
The backstory of Star Wars: Demolition is that the Empire declares a ban on Jabba the Hutt's sport of podracing. To replace this lucrative enterprise, Jabba creates a more life-threatening contest where combatants fight to the death in or on vehicles. Several combatants enter the competition. Boba Fett enters, opting to use only his jetpack. Fellow bounty hunter and occasional partner Aurra Sing also enters, a swoop bike her vehicle of choice. Other opponents mount various forms of tanks, landspeeders, and even a rancor to compete in this battle to the death.

== Development ==
Demolition was announced on April 14, 2000 via StarWars.com. Luxoflux would develop the game while LucasArts would publish it, while in Europe the game would be co-published and distributed by Activision. Before its release it was known as Star Wars: Demolition Racer. This would later be shortened to Star Wars: Demolition. Luxoflux used the same game engine that was used in Vigilante 8 and its sequel Vigilante 8: Second Offense. It was initially announced as a PlayStation exclusive; in July 2000 it was rumoured that the game would come to Dreamcast. This was confirmed the following month. It was released in November 2000 in North America on both systems. A European release followed in December 2000.

== Reception ==
Reception

Aggregate score
Aggregator	Score	
Aggregator	Dreamcast	PS
Metacritic	67/100	63/100

Review scores
Publication	Score	
Publication	Dreamcast	PS
AllGame	3/5	3/5
CNET Gamecenter	6/10	3/10
Electronic Gaming Monthly	7.5/10	6.33/10 (Note: Two critics of Electronic Gaming Monthly gave the PlayStation version each a score of 6.5/10, and the other gave it 6/10.)
EP Daily	7/10	7/10
Eurogamer	4/10	N/A
Game Informer	7/10	7/10
GameFan	45%	N/A
GameRevolution	B−	B−
GameSpot	7.4/10	6.7/10
GameSpy	6/10	N/A
IGN	7.6/10	8/10
Next Generation	2/5	N/A
Official U.S. PlayStation Magazine	N/A	3.5/5
The Cincinnati Enquirer	3/5	N/A

Star Wars: Demolition received "mixed or average reviews" on both platforms according to the review aggregation website Metacritic.

Dan Elektro of GamePro's January 2001 issue felt that the PlayStation version's charm runs out quickly, providing little replay value. (Note: GamePro gave the PlayStation version 4/5 for graphics, two 3.5/5 scores for sound and control, and 3/5 for fun factor.) In the same issue, The Bamboo Carabao said of the Dreamcast version, "After a few hours of Demoltion, fun is the only thing that gets demolished." (Note: GamePro gave the Dreamcast version three 3/5 scores for graphics, control, and fun factor, and 4/5 for sound.) The reviewer of GameRevolution stated that gameplay is "definitely fun", but that with prolonged play it becomes easier notice the imbalance in gameplay. The game was critically panned in retrospective playthroughs and reviews of the game. Game Informer staff members Andrew Reiner, Jeff Cork, Jeff Marchiafava, and Kyle Hilliard found the game appalling in a replay. During the gameplay one staff member asked "How does it feel?" "Oh, it's awful!" was the reply. The staff felt the battles were too long, gameplay was confusing, and that it was too difficult to damage enemies. It also made Game Informer's list of Six Games We Don't Mind Being Ejected From Star Wars Canon.

In a somewhat more positive review IGN's Anthony Chau, who reviewed the Dreamcast version, noted that despite the game's flaws he enjoyed playing Demolition "in small amounts of time." Chau's colleague David Smith, who reviewed the PlayStation version, said that the game was a "very well-done spiritual successor to the first Vigilante 8, though, fixing many of the problems with Second Offense." Joe Fielder of GameSpot said that the game can seem like "some half-baked attempt to cash in on the Star Wars license, though it's actually a competently executed game." Eric Bratcher of NextGen compared the Dreamcast version to the video game adaptation of Star Wars: Episode I – The Phantom Menace, saying, "All the pieces are there, but they just don't amount to anything."
