= Vigilante 8 Arcade =

2008 video game

- Xbox Live Arcade cover art
- Developer: Isopod Labs
- Publisher: Activision
- Platform: Xbox 360
- Release: WW: November 5, 2008
- Genre: Vehicular combat
- Modes: Single-player, multiplayer

Vigilante 8 Arcade is a vehicular combat video game developed by Isopod Labs and published by Activision. It was released on November 5, 2008, for Xbox 360 through Xbox Live Arcade. Isopod Labs was formed by three former members of Luxoflux, developer of the original Vigilante 8 series. A remake of Vigilante 8 with some elements of Vigilante 8: Second Offense included, Vigilante 8 Arcade features online play for up to eight players.

Vigilante 8 Arcade received mixed reviews. Reviewers were divided; multiple reviewers felt the game was a good fit for Xbox Live, with one reviewer calling it "a glorious throwback to a simpler age in gaming". Others praised the game's online multiplayer component and the game's salvage upgrade system. Some reviewers, however, felt that the vehicle physics were poor.

== Gameplay ==
Vigilante 8 Arcade is a remake of Vigilante 8, with some influences from its sequel, Vigilante 8: 2nd Offense.

Vigilante 8 Arcade is a vehicular combat game in which vehicles are outfitted with weaponry to combat opponents. Each vehicle is equipped with machine guns and one special attack that is unique to that vehicle. Weapon powerups are littered throughout each map and can range from heat seeking missiles to mines. Each can be fired in a total of four ways, the weapon's standard operation and via three specialized, more powerful attacks unique to that weapon. The game uses a salvage point upgrade system similar to Vigilante 8: Second Offense, meaning that vehicles can be upgraded by picking up salvage point icons dropped by enemies.

V8 Arcade features four single player game modes. In Quest mode, players choose a character and play through the game from that character's perspective, learning about the character's background as the game progresses. In Quick Battle, players are brought straight to a random battle in a random vehicle to fight against random enemies until the player is either dead or victorious. Custom Battle is similar, but allows players to choose the vehicle(s) and the arena to play in. Free Wheelin' is a mode with no AI that allows players to drive around the environment, searching for secrets and learning the layout. Multiplayer can be played with up to four players via splitscreen, and up to eight players online via Xbox Live. It features two modes, Deathmatch, which pits all players against each other, and Team Co-Op, where two human players work together against AI opponents.

The game includes five levels, each inspired by original Vigilante 8 and Vigilante 8: Second Offense levels, but with modified layouts. Some of the game's levels are inspired by multiple levels from the previous games, melded together to create a new environment. Two additional levels were available via downloadable content. The first, Stunt Track, is a circular track that has ramps, loops and other daredevil-esque hazards. The second, Garage, is an oversized level set in a giant garage, making vehicles the size of an RC car.

== Synopsis ==
Vigilante 8 Arcade is built around an alternate history, in which there was a serious worldwide oil crisis in the 1970s. The United States was on the verge of an economic breakdown, with rampant crime, strikes and riots.

All available law enforcement had been called into major cities, leaving the countryside and outlands vulnerable. A foreign multinational oil consortium, Oil Monopoly Alliance Regime (OMAR), sought to monopolize the world's oil trade. To this end, OMAR hired professional terrorist Sid Burn to wreak havoc in the US and destroy the economy there.

Sid recruited a number of mercenaries, who later became known as the Coyotes. Their job was to assist Sid on his missions that involved destroying oil refineries, commercial installations and other industrial facilities throughout the Southwestern United States. With no law enforcement around to protect them, a group of local civilians, led by trucker Convoy, teamed up to fend off the Coyotes, calling themselves the Vigilantes.

As conditions continued to deteriorate, the US government focused on the research and development of advanced weaponry reverse engineered from alien technology, located at Site 4, a secret facility at Papoose Lake; word was leaked to Sid and the Coyotes ambushed the location. When the Vigilantes arrived to stop them, both parties found themselves in a battle for possession of the world's most advanced weaponry.

=== Characters ===
There are a total of eight playable characters at the start of the game, similar to the original Vigilante 8, with each of their vehicles coming with five different color options. Each character also has their own story mode, which unlocks the original vehicle model from Vigilante 8 for use in all game modes upon completion. There is one unlockable character and downloadable content featuring more characters.

== Development and marketing ==
Vigilante 8 Arcade was announced in February 2008. The game's developer, Isopod Labs, consisted of three key individuals responsible for much of the production of the original Vigilante 8. The studio consisted of just six individuals and a small number of art contractors, and the title's development was self-funded. Isopod Labs originally looked to a June release; however, the game was not originally submitted for Xbox Live certification until August 12. Testers found issues on Microsoft's end in relation to the QNet code library. The issue was resolved by both parties and the game was sent back to Microsoft for resubmission. In a post-release interview with Joystiq Isopod Labs' Adrian Stephens added that "the certification issue is a tricky one and more could be done to smooth the path towards certification". Vigilante 8 Arcade passed Microsoft's Xbox Live certification on September 24 and was released in November 5, 2008.

Vehicles in Vigilante 8 Arcade are largely based on the original Vigilante 8 and the soundtrack is a remixed version of the music from Vigilante 8: 2nd Offense. The game supports the Xbox Live Vision camera, allowing players to see opponents face-to-face. Isopod Labs also converted the original cars from Vigilante 8 as unlockable bonus content. A custom theme was created by J3Concepts for the original blades Xbox 360 dashboard. A downloadable content add-on, titled High Octane Pack, featured three new characters and two new levels, and was released on Xbox Live marketplace in December 3, 2008.

== Reception ==
Reception

Aggregate score
Aggregator	Score
Metacritic	58/100

Review scores
Publication	Score
1Up.com	C
Eurogamer	5/10
GamePro	2.5/5
GameSpot	4.5/10
IGN	7.3/10
Official Xbox Magazine (UK)	8/10
Official Xbox Magazine (US)	6/10
TeamXbox	6.1/10

Vigilante 8 Arcade received "mixed" reviews according to the review aggregation website Metacritic.

Reviewers generally remarked on the game's multiplayer as its strong point. Official Xbox Magazine UK reviewer Ryan King called V8 Arcade "a glorious throwback to a simpler age in gaming". He further applauded the game's online multiplayer, stating that it was some of the best that Xbox Live Arcade has to offer players. Nate Ahearn of IGN welcomed the game's salvage gameplay mechanic while also praising the online multiplayer. Official Xbox Magazine's Mitch Dyer also commented on the strong multiplayer, and added positive remarks on the amount of weaponry and number of firing modes per weapon. TeamXbox's Tom Price noted the game's "big levels, tons of weapon pickups, and crazy opponents" calling them "simple and effective". Reviewer Andrew Hayward of 1UP.com stated the game's predecessors "built a solid foundation for taking the series online" adding that the game as fun when "pounding mortar shots and missiles at some unfortunate foe from afar".

Critics were disappointed in the poor controls, gameplay glitches, and game camera issues. OXM's Dyer commented that the game had "crummy controls" and a poor camera. Reviewer Austin Light of GameSpot also cited poor controls, physics, and gameplay glitches. Eurogamer's Dan Whitehead felt the controls were weak in comparison to the original Vigilante 8. He further felt the game did not meet up to its potential. 1UP.com's Hayward further agreed with Whitehead, saying "sadly [...] most of Vigilante 8 Arcade's issues are technical in nature".

Vigilante 8 Arcade sold over 60,000 copies as of June 2010. Though reviews of the game had been mixed, some reviewers cited its relatively inexpensive 800 Microsoft Point cost as a selling point.
