= Luxoflux =

American video game developer

Luxoflux Corp.
- Type: Subsidiary
- Industry: Video games
- Founded: January 1997; 29 years ago
- Defunct: February 11, 2010; 16 years ago
- Fate: Closed
- Headquarters: Santa Monica, California, US
- Key people: Peter Morawiec; Adrian Stephens; Sers Rick
- Products: Vigilante 8 series True Crime series
- Number of employees: 80
- Parent: Activision (2002–2010)

Luxoflux Corp. was an American video game developer founded by Peter Morawiec and Adrian Stephens in January 1997, and based in Santa Monica, California.

== History ==
Luxoflux was founded in January 1997 by former Sega Technical Institute developers Adrian Stephens and Peter Morawiec, both of whom had left Sega after STI was closed the previous month. Originally, the studio's name was planned to be Alpha Channel, until that name was discovered to already have been in use. The name "Luxoflux" was conceived from a mixture of syllables, and was selected as it meant "movement of light".

Luxoflux had a relatively small-sized development team for its first few titles. The two founders were joined by Jeremy Engelman, David Goodrich and Edvard Toth, and released their first title Vigilante 8 to great success. The game was ported to the Nintendo 64, and was followed by the sequel Vigilante 8: 2nd Offense in 1999.

In October 2002, Activision announced it had purchased Luxoflux for an undisclosed price. At the time, the studio was working on True Crime: Streets of LA. The studio delivered the game and its sequel, True Crime: New York City, before working on licensed titles Shrek 2, Kung Fu Panda and Transformers: Revenge of the Fallen.

On February 11, 2010, Activision announced it had shut down Luxoflux, RedOctane and Underground Development as part of a widespread staff reduction.

== Video Games ==
Released

Year	Game	Platform(s)
1998	Vigilante 8	PlayStation, Nintendo 64
1999	Vigilante 8: 2nd Offense	PlayStation, Nintendo 64, Dreamcast
2000	Star Wars: Demolition	PlayStation, Dreamcast
2003	True Crime: Streets of LA	Microsoft Windows, GameCube, PlayStation 2, Xbox
2004	Shrek 2	Microsoft Windows, GameCube, PlayStation 2, Xbox
2005	True Crime: New York City	Microsoft Windows, GameCube, PlayStation 2, Xbox
2008	Kung Fu Panda	PlayStation 3, Xbox 360
2009	Transformers: Revenge of the Fallen	PlayStation 3, Xbox 360

=== Cancelled ===
- King (2003)

== Isopod Labs ==
After leaving Luxoflux, Morawiec and Stephens founded Isopod Labs in January 2007 and announced Vigilante 8 Arcade, released on Xbox Live Arcade in November 2008.

=== Games ===
- Vigilante 8 Arcade
- Jimmie Johnson's Anything with an Engine
- Keep Off My Hill
