= Assault Suit Leynos (2015 video game) =

- Developer: Dracue
- Publishers: EXTREME Co. Rising Star Games
- Series: Assault Suit
- Platforms: PlayStation 4, Windows
- Release: PS4: JP: December 23, 2015; NA: July 14, 2016; EU: July 14, 2016; Windows: NA: August 30, 2016; EU: August 30, 2016
- Genre: Run and gun
- Mode: Single-player

Assault Suit Leynos is a side-scrolling run and gun video game and a remake of the eponymous 1990 game, formerly called Target Earth in North America. It is part of the Assault Suit series. Developed by Dracue, it was published by EXTREME Co., Ltd in Japan and Rising Star Games elsewhere. It was released on December 23, 2015, in Japan and July 14, 2016, in North America and Europe for PlayStation 4, with its Steam release being on August 30, 2016. As with the original, the plot revolves around humanity being attacked by an unknown force and retaliating with the Assault Suit Squadron.

== Reception ==
The game's PS4 version received an aggregate score of 67/100 on Metacritic, indicating "mixed or average reviews".

Jeremy Peeples of Hardcore Gamer rated the game 4/5 points, saying that "it takes everything that worked about the original and improves upon it with modern flourishes". Expressing surprise that the original game was even playable without a modern stick setup, he called the remake more forgiving, yet still challenging. He praised the new graphics as a "huge upgrade", but criticized the explosions as too large. He also called the soundtrack unexciting.

Ramón Nafria of Vandal rated the game 7.5/10, calling it "difficult, intense and epic", but said that it would most appeal to older retro gamers. He praised the dramatic, space opera story, and called the graphics visually excellent and much better than the original game.

Robert Ramsey of Push Square rated the game 7/10 stars, calling it a "solid mech shooter" and praising the fact that the entire original Genesis title was included. Calling the gameplay satisfying and accurate to being a large mech, he further described it as "uncompromising", but, on Easy or Normal difficulties, "far from being soul-crushingly brutal". He criticized the game for sometimes being overwhelming when its important dialog overlays intense gameplay.
