= Swypeout =

- Swypeout Battle Racing Starter Kit
- Developers: Spin Master; Fuel Industries
- Platform: Windows

Swypeout Battle Racing, or simply Swypeout, was an online personal computer game produced by Spin Master that was released in 2007. On January 1, 2009 the Swypeout Battle Racing online service was closed.

== Description ==
Swypeout consisted of an online personal computer game that worked in conjunction with collectible cards. Players swiped physical cards in a USB card reader that represented in-game cars, upgrades, and weapons. The game also had "promo" codes that unlocked different cards. The code consisted of six numbers and/or letters.

The object of the game was to place first in online races, battling other players along the way. Players were rewarded based on their finishing position with credits that could be spent in-game on additional cars and upgrades. In-game tournaments were held, with the prizes being "credits," the in-game currency. These "credits" were used to purchase upgrades in the in-game store.

There were 17 cars, 34 mods, and 61 Battle Cards available to collect. A thank you and goodbye note was posted on the official website when the online game closed on January 1, 2009, and the stated reason for the closure was due to insufficient customer interest.

Swypeout is also compared to other racing games such as Project Torque and Drift City.
