= Death Track: Resurrection =

2008 video game

- Developer: SkyFallen Entertainment
- Publishers: 1C Company, 505 Games, Aspyr Media
- Series: Deathtrack
- Engine: TheEngine
- Platforms: Windows (physical copy, Steam) PlayStation 3 (PSN)
- Release: RU: February 22, 2008; NA: March 31, 2009; EU: March 24, 2009
- Genres: Racing, vehicular combat
- Mode: Single-player

Death Track: Resurrection (Russian: Death Track: Возрождение) is a 2008 action racing video game developed by Russian studio SkyFallen Entertainment and published by 1C Company. It is the sequel to the 1989 game Deathtrack. Outside of the CIS, the game was published by 505 Games in the European Union and Aspyr Media in North America, which was released DRM free. In the Russian release, the game had an advertisement for MegaFon, including a brand sticker on the first car.

== Gameplay ==
Death Track: Resurrection is set in the future after World War III. The game involves racing and trying to finish first across several tracks located around the world, including Bangkok, Vatican City, London, Moscow, New York, Paris, Prague, San Diego, Istanbul and Tokyo. Players try to earn points by doing various stunts, which can be used for upgrades to cars and weapons. Cars can be equipped with an assortment of weapons, which can be fired at opponents to slow them down and knock them out. In this scenario, the main character is Antonio Salevani whose objective is to defeat Thorvald Nesson in New York, to get revenge on him because he killed the previous eight pilots, to destroy his Bosscar, and to revive his career. Besides Thorvald the other opponents you race against are Shiroi Tokugawa, Kim Ho, Vassily, Rebecca, Chamorro, Martha, Jeremy and Rachel For the PlayStation 3 version, a DLC was released, which included one new car - Hari 108.

== Reception ==
Death Track: Resurrection received mixed reviews. The average game ranking based on eight reviews is 53.87% according to GameRankings. GameSpot rated the game 5.5/10 and IGN rated it 6.7/10.
