= Darkwind: War on Wheels =

2007 video game

- Developer: Sam Redfern
- Publisher: Psychic Software
- Designer: Sam Redfern
- Engine: Torque Game Engine
- Platforms: Mac OS X, Windows
- Release: May 4, 2007
- Genre: Turn-based tactics racing MMO
- Mode: Multiplayer

Darkwind: War on Wheels is a turn-based racing and vehicle combat massively multiplayer online game for Microsoft Windows and Mac OS X by Irish developer Sam Redfern. It is inspired by the tabletop game Car Wars and the Mad Max movies, but set in an original universe. Darkwind was opened to the public on May 4, 2007, after two years of development and been continually updated. It was re-released for Steam in 2014 as free-to-play.

== Plot ==
A disastrous solar event in 2019 and 2020 leaves the world devastated, with only small pockets of human survivors scratching out a living in a bleak, irradiated world. Largely fuelled by the stockpiles of hardware left behind by a dead civilization combined with the desperation of a new world order, gladiatorial death-sports begin around the year 2035. The vast expanses of wilderness between the towns are menaced by gangs of road pirates armed with heavily armed cars and trucks, and travelled by equally well armed trade groups, making a living by carrying food, fuel, and other specialist equipment between the towns.

== Gameplay ==
The focus of the game is on vehicular combat - cars with guns - both in the wilderness and in manmade arenas and racing circuits. Gameplay is split between a web interface (for strategic management) and a 3D interface that supports Windows, Mac OS X and Linux (for control of your characters and vehicles during a combat or race).

There are all sorts of activities to do within the game. Players can gain fame and accumulate looted hardware from their defeated adversaries (who may be either computer-controlled or player-controlled), but risk suffering defeat and the lives of their gang members. Wilderness actions are frequently performed by multi-player squads: by joining, players can greatly increase their chance of survival. Alternatively, players can also join town events, such as races and death races, to gain fame and earn prizes. These can be joined as standard events, competitive leagues or ladders.

Eight towns are currently open to players, each offering distinct death race tracks and wilderness combat maps around it. Darkwind currently has more than 20 racetracks with more under development. Camps were also introduced in 2008, allowing players to establish communities in addition to the towns on the game map. Camps can grow food, harvest water, build weapons, repair vehicles, etc.

=== Web interface ===
Through the web-interface the players can manage the recruiting, finances and the gang's vehicle garage.

Characters can be trained in combat and non-combat skills such as driving, gunnery, mechanic, scouting, first aid, handguns, etc. which adds role-playing video game elements to the game.

The character's death in Darkwind is permanent. In addition to perma-death Darkwind has a complex injury system with long-term (broken bones) and permanent (limb-loss). Amusingly characters can lose more limbs than they physically have, such as losing a leg 5 times, but this severely limits their lifespan. Replacing dead gang members is easy, however, making it usually just a minor setback.

Many of the aspects of Darkwind run to a real-world timescale. It takes days or weeks for the players' characters to heal from their injuries; it takes hours or days to repair/upgrade vehicles, and it takes hours to travel between towns. This makes strategic decisions carry real importance, and gameplay aspects such as trading take real time and effort, which allows them to work properly as part of the dynamic economy.

The availability of hardware in the markets is directly related to what scrap loot players sell off. If wilderness pirates are not kept beaten down on a regular basis, for example, then rare chassis types and weapons will not be easy to find except through combat.

The players' characters can die of old age. Sometimes they will die as early as 30 years old (game age). Injuries and other factors can affect their lifespan and is noticeable by a degradation of physical statistics (Strength, Dexterity, Speed) as well as a "General Health" tagline such as "Weakening" or "Deteriorating Fast" to help the player know which of his characters are suffering from early-onset death. In-game years pass every 12 real life weeks.

Plans included the implementation of a carefully developed economic model based on systems dynamic simulations. It was planned that the control and distribution of key resources would underpin a realistic, dynamic economy, providing real opportunities for trade to be used as a gameplay strategy, and control of key resources to be used as part of long term feuds and warfare. However, the lack of a playerbase large enough to support this model led to a simplified version remaining in place. The actions of the player gangs and the victories and defeats of the computer-controlled pirate and trader gangs directly impacts the quality of Loot recovered after battles but has little effect on the gameworld itself, or economy.

=== Game client ===
The main turn based tactical gameplay which is the core of the game is done through a freely downloadable game client.

In Darkwind, turn-based gameplay racing becomes purely about the tactics of entering and exiting corners, passing opponents, and generally breaking down the nuances of driving that normally become automated in a traditional driving game. As real-world professional racing has much more to do with tactics than reactions (for example F1 or NASCAR races), the turn-based nature of Darkwind allows players to race more professionally by letting them battle it out tactically rather just waiting to see who is first to make a mistake. Darkwind's turn-based system also allows for highly detailed rules and strategy, as players have more time to assign orders to characters and vehicles.

There are two phases when the turn ends. One is the Orders phase, in which players will see their vehicles move accordingly. This is affected by many factors, including the vehicle's position, damage to tires, previous velocity, whether it is under fire etc. The second is the firing phase, whereby vehicles open fire on their targets, depending on the orders given. The extent of damage is revealed through text messages, similar to old-school RPGs such as Fallout.

=== Vehicular customization ===
As of October 2007, Darkwind had 50+ unique vehicle chassis including subcompacts, sedans, muscle cars, SUVs and larger vans and trucks. There are 14 different engines and 50+ weapons ranging from rams and flamethrowers for close combat to rocket launchers and mortars for long-range attacks. Each of the chassis and weapons offers different advantages which allows players to create varying vehicle designs. The weapons have detailed statistics underlying them, including: recoil, close range and ranged accuracy, damage factors, psychological 'fear factors', and ammunition.

=== Future updates ===
Between 2015 and 2019, no additional content was added, but in 2020, the game received several significant updates (including UI changes). Feedback was also requested by Psychic Studios to make the game less difficult for new players.

== Soundtrack ==
The soundtrack to Darkwind: War on Wheels uses tracks written by Dean Garcia of the band Curve.

== Reception ==
Reception

Review scores
Publication	Score
PC Gamer (UK)	80/100
Bytten	90%
Inside Mac Games	7.5/10
Gametunnel	8.1/10

Awards
Publication	Award
Gametunnel	Gold Award / Game of the Month, May 2009
Bytten	Most Addictive of 2009

Reviews have been consistently favourable. Andrew Williams from Bytten remarks that Darkwind "...is a seriously addictive game". PC Gamer UK calls Darkwind "...the best quasi-real-time, partially browser-based, online, post-apocalyptic turn-based vehicular fighting game we’ve played".

One of the game's key selling features is the wide variety of activities to participate in. Inside Mac Games, in its review, said: "This is a breath of fresh air in what I consider a very stale and one-sided genre of gameplay, where even the behemoth in the market seems destined for repetition". Gametunnel reviewer Joseph Lieberman also praises Darkwind for its harsh, unforgiving setting, saying "...it is refreshing to see an online game that doesn't let you off the hook when things go south".

Darkwind was chosen by Gametunnel for Game of the Month in May 2009, receiving its Gold Award. Bytten has also awarded Darkwind with the "Most Addictive of 2009" Bytten Ernie Award.
