= Interstate '76 =

1997 video game

- Developer: Activision
- Publisher: Activision
- Director: Sean Vesce
- Producer: Scott Krager
- Designer: Zachary Norman
- Programmer: Dan Stanfill
- Artist: Rick Glenn
- Writer: Zachary Norman
- Composer: Arion Salazar
- Platform: Windows
- Release: NA: March 26, 1997; UK: April 4, 1997
- Genre: Vehicular combat
- Modes: Single-player, multiplayer

Interstate '76 is a 1997 vehicular combat video game developed and published by Activision for Microsoft Windows. It is set in the year 1976, in an alternate timeline where the 1973 oil crisis never ended, leading to widespread chaos in the American Southwest. To survive the lawlessness, civilians become vigilantes, modifying their cars with weapons in order to survive. Gameplay revolves around customizing and altering cars to engage in combat with enemy vehicles. The game was developed using an enhanced version of the engine previously used in MechWarrior 2: 31st Century Combat (1995), and numerous well-known musicians contributed to the soundtrack.

Interstate '76 was released on March 26, 1997. It received generally favorable reviews, and was praised for its originality, style, music, and characters, while being criticized for its graphics and the difficulty of driving and shooting simultaneously. It received an expansion in 1998, a sequel, Interstate '82 (1999), and spawned a spin-off series, Vigilante 8.

== Plot ==
The game opens in the Southwestern United States in an alternate history of the year 1976, in which the 1973 oil crisis was never resolved. The corrupt police force is ineffective against rampant riots, and the area devolves into lawless chaos. In an attempt to maintain order, some civilians turn to vigilantism by outfitting their vehicles with armor and weapons. One such vigilante, Jade Champion, is found murdered in a junkyard.

Suspecting foul play and seeking vengeance, fellow vigilante Taurus convinces Jade's brother Groove to join him in his investigation. Although reluctant, Groove proves himself a talented driver and a capable fighter, quickly picking up on the necessary skills to survive in battle.

In the course of their patrols, the two stumble upon a briefcase containing a large amount of money, and plans for a nuclear device. Taurus deduces that Jade had found out about this as well, attracting the ire of higher powers that got her killed. Further investigation clues them into spying on the deal to acquire the bomb, during which they learn of its intended delivery: an old military fort built on top of North America's largest oil reserve.

Groove storms the fort, fighting against an unexpectedly overwhelming opposition that leaves him with no way out. In a desperate maneuver, he ramps over the fort's outer wall and crashes into the compound, wrecking his car in the process and knocking himself unconscious. Upon awakening, he finds himself at the mercy of Antonio Malochio, Jade's killer and the mastermind behind the plan. As he arms the nuclear bomb, Malochio openly gloats that he has been hired by OPEC to destroy America's oil reserve in order to perpetuate the crisis and keep prices high.

Groove taunts Malochio into a duel, accusing him of dishonorably killing Jade. Furious, Malochio orders him to pick a car from the garage and fight him one-on-one. Despite fighting an unfair battle with Malochio's henchmen joining in as reinforcements, Groove emerges victorious, leaving Malochio trapped in the remains of his own car. As Malochio begs for his life, Groove experiences a brief vision of Jade in the distance, giving him the resolve to execute Malochio at gunpoint, and sate his revenge.

== Gameplay ==
A battle in the game between Groove Champion's Picard Piranha (orange) and a Phaedra Rattler.

There is a damage model to the vehicles that affects both its appearance and physics. Specific weapons can be destroyed to make them unusable, and tires can be popped to alter the vehicle's handling. There is also collision detection with the rendered world, as colliding with any object (such as buildings, signs, ledges, or other vehicles) can cause damage to the vehicle.

There are four play modes available in the game: the "T.R.I.P." (an acronym for "Total Recreational Interactive Production"), which follows the game's protagonists in an episodic story; "Multi Melee", an online deathmatch version of the game; "Auto Melee", a deathmatch with computer-driven cars; and "Scenarios", short free-standing adventures featuring the game's protagonists. Before the "Scenarios", "Auto Melee", and "Multi Melee" modes (and in-between missions during the "T.R.I.P." mode), players can choose a wide array of weapons and accessories based on their preference, and can also alter the vehicle's parts such as engines, brakes, and tires. Players can also distribute the weight and chassis of the vehicle, altering its armor and overall stability. All of the modes, except for "T.R.I.P.", also allow players to choose what vehicle to drive. The game's vehicles are faithful reproductions of various cars and trucks from the era, both in appearance and driving characteristics, though the names have been changed for licensing issues.

== Development ==
The game is based on the engine used for Activision's MechWarrior 2: 31st Century Combat. Lead designer Zack Norman recounted: "The idea came from a desire to use the Mech [Warrior] II technology to the next level and make a real action-simulation hybrid - a vehicle action simulation - but also infuse it with a style and a soul that hadn't been exploited before". The inspiration to set the game in the 1970s came when Norman was contemplating using his bonus from MechWarrior 2 to buy a 1970s muscle car.

The developers eschewed the convention of using more detailed models for cutscenes, preferring that the game remain stylistically consistent across the interactive and non-interactive portions. Considerable modification of the MechWarrior 2 engine was needed, as director Sean Vesce explained: "If you look at the Mech II engine, it had a long and difficult history, developed by a large team of programmers over the course of two or three years under the direction of several producers, with a lot of trials and tribulations before it went out the door. As you can imagine, the technology was held together with super glue and bubble gum. So when we got our hands on it, we really had to gut a lot of the systems".

For the game's soundtrack, a session band was formed under the name Bullmark. It consisted of various musicians, all from well-known acts, such as Arion Salazar from Third Eye Blind on bass, Brain from Primus on drums, Tom Coster from Santana on keyboards, David Shul from Spearhead on guitars, Les Harris from The Ritz on horns, Louis Fasman from Mark Masters' Jazz Orchestra on horns, and Jon Bendich from Starpoint on percussion. The music was produced by Jason Slater and engineered by Eric Valentine, both of whom created the band Snake River Conspiracy around the same time. Activision employee Kelly W. Rogers was credited as an executive producer as well.

The film rights to the game were acquired in March 1998 by 20th Century Fox and Davis Entertainment, but nothing came of the project and was cancelled.

== Reception ==
Interstate '76

Aggregate score
Aggregator	Score
Metacritic	80/100

Review scores
Publication	Score
Computer Gaming World	4.5/5
Computer and Video Games	5/5
Edge	8/10
GameRevolution	B+
GameSpot	8.9/10
Hyper	91%
Next Generation	4/5
PC Gamer (US)	93%
PC PowerPlay	93%
PC Zone	79%
Entertainment Weekly	A−

In the United States, the game sold 74,028 copies during 1997. Interstate '76 received "favorable" reviews according to the review aggregation website Metacritic.

Next Generation stated that "none of the minor annoyances detract much at all from the game's overall impact. Interstate '76 easily lives up to the hype - it really is 'the funkiest PC game ever'". GamePro criticized the bland polygonal graphics, lack of detail in the backgrounds, and difficulty with simultaneously driving and shooting, but praised the funk soundtrack and characters, in particular opining that "every barb from Taurus is a treasure".

Interstate '76 was a runner-up for Computer Gaming World's 1997 "Action Game of the Year" award, which ultimately went to Quake II. The editors called Interstate '76 "more stylish and original [than Quake II], but it suffered a lack of good 3D support and an irritating save feature"; however, the game did receive the 1997 "Artistic Achievement" award. Interstate '76 was also the runner-up for GameSpot's 1997 "Action/Simulation" award, which ultimately went to Wing Commander: Prophecy. For PC Gamer's 1997 awards, Interstate '76 was a runner-up in both the "Action Game of the Year" and "Multiplayer Game of the Year" awards, both of which went to Quake II, although Interstate '76 did win the awards for both "Special Achievement in Music" and "Special Achievement in Cinematics". During the inaugural Interactive Achievement Awards, Interstate '76 was a finalist for the Academy of Interactive Arts & Sciences' "Outstanding Achievement in Sound and Music" award, which was ultimately given to PaRappa the Rapper.

In 1998, PC Gamer declared it the 26th-best computer game ever released, and the editors called it "the most original action game released in a decade". Interstate '76 was included in the retrospective book 1001 Video Games You Must Play Before You Die, which was originally published in 2010.

== Expansion pack ==
The cover of the Nitro Riders expansion.

Interstate '76: Nitro Pack (known as Interstate '76: Nitro Riders in Europe) is a stand-alone expansion pack for Interstate '76. It was developed by Activision and released on February 28, 1998 for Windows. It includes 20 single-player missions.

Nitro Pack received favorable reviews. PC Zone said that Nitro Pack "thankfully builds on the graphical shortcomings of the original Interstate '76 by adding all sorts of 3D support. Anyone who played the previous release with the Direct3D patch we gave away last issue will know what to expect; if you don't have a 3D card you probably won't notice that much of an improvement, and even if you do there are still some obvious problems: shadows don't hang together too well and mountains continue to spring up from the middle distance. It's annoying, but it doesn't really matter too much because the game oozes style from every pixellated pore. For 20 quid it's perfect throwaway fun that should appeal to anyone with a fond appreciation of Starsky & Hutch". Edge magazine gave the game 8 out of 10.

A graphically enhanced version of the original game, Interstate '76: Gold Edition, was also released. A compilation package, The Interstate '76 Arsenal, was released in February 1998. It includes the Gold Edition and the expansion. In 18 February 2010 GOG.com released a downloadable version of The Interstate '76 Arsenal.

Computer Gaming World gave The Interstate '76 Arsenal 4 out of 5, Game Revolution gave it B+, and GameSpot gave it 7.6 out 10.

== Sequel ==
Interstate '76 spawned a direct sequel, Interstate '82, as well as the Vigilante 8 spin-off series for video game consoles.

As mentioned, Interstate '76 utilized an improved version of the MechWarrior 2 game engine, which was built in-house by Activision. The engine would be reused and tweaked again after Interstate '76's release for the mech combat title Heavy Gear and the strategic combat title Battlezone.
