= Pop'n Tanks! =

1999 Japanese video game

- Developer: Symbio Systems
- Publisher: Enix
- Director: Jun Matsumoto
- Producer: Shinji Wasi
- Designers: Jun Matsumoto; Junichi Saito; Yuki Ohora
- Artist: Mine Yoshizaki
- Composers: AZUMA (Newton); Hirofumi Sano; Shinji Naga
- Platform: PlayStation
- Release: JP: 29 July 1999
- Genre: Vehicular combat
- Modes: Single-player, multiplayer

Pop'n Tanks! (Note: Japanese: ポップンタンクス!, Hepburn: Poppun Tankusu!) is a 1999 Japanese video game released for the PlayStation. It was developed by Symbio Systems and published by Enix. The game was directed by Jun Matsumoto, while manga artist Mine Yoshizaki provided character designs.

The game is a tank combat game, featuring one on one battles between tanks. The game has never been released outside of Japan and received mixed reviews with most giving it mediocre scores.

== Gameplay ==
Gameplay screenshot

The game is a one vs. one shooting action game, pitting tanks in a 3D environment. A despot named Talin has lost his newly developed tank called Petit tank, which the player is now in possession of. He mobilizes his empire to retrieve the tank.

The game features two gameplay modes: Story and Tank World. Tank World is direct battles against either a human or computer-controlled opponent.

The player starts with 8 tanks to choose from. The game features strong customization of the player's tank. There are 160 canon parts, 30 special attack parts, and 70 accessory parts. In total, over 300 parts are available. Changes to the player's tank cannon are reflected in the game's graphics. Completely custom tanks can be created, saved to the PlayStation's memory card, and even pitted against another player's custom tank as well. The game's arsenal includes both long range and short range weaponry.

The game features a camera system that automatically locks onto the opponent, and when the player is behind obstacles they become transparent.

== Development and release ==
The game was developed by Japanese game developer Symbio Systems. The game was directed by Jun Matsumoto, and it has character designs by manga artist Mine Yoshizaki. The game's story is told through long anime videos, as well as having an art design that is anime inspired and chibi (super deformed). The game was shown at the 1998 Autumn Tokyo Game Show.

Each tank has approximately 450 polygons to render, and the game's engine attempts to realistically replicate elements of tanks including tread physics, suspension, and engine exhaust. The tank's suspension even bends when making turns.

The game was released on July 29, 1999, for the PlayStation in Japan and was published by Enix. An official strategy guide was released as well. The game has never been released outside of Japan, and has never been released for the PlayStation Network.

== Reception ==
Reception

Review scores
Publication	Score
Famitsu	7/10, 6/10, 7/10, 7/10
Joypad	4/10
Dengeki PlayStation	65/100, 70/100
Extreme PlayStation	83%
Gamers' Republic	B

Pop'n Tanks! received an average reception from critics. Dave Halverson of Gamers' Republic stated that the game was well deserving of an American localization, praising the game's controls, physics and camera. Halverson said the game is fun in either single-player or multiplayer modes, noting that the tanks had as much personality as their pilots and more "vigor" than those found in Tiny Tank. He wondered if the in-game cinematics implied it might be turned into an anime series and hoped that the game would get a sequel on the PlayStation 2. Gamers' Republic later listed it in their 1999 Video Game Buyers Guide and Y2K Preview as one of the best games to import from Japan that year.
