= Fire & Forget II =

1990 racing video game

- Developer: Titus
- Publishers: Titus; Amstrad
- Platforms: Amiga, Atari ST, Amstrad CPC, Commodore 64, MS-DOS, Master System, GX4000
- Release: EU: November 1990
- Genres: Racing, shoot 'em up
- Mode: Single-player

Fire & Forget II is a 1990 futuristic racing-shooter video game developed and published by Titus for the Amiga, Atari ST, Amstrad CPC, Commodore 64, MS-DOS, Master System, and by Amstrad for the GX4000. It is the sequel to Fire and Forget, which was developed by Titus France SA for a number of platforms including the ZX Spectrum. Fire & Forget II is one of a number of similar games which emerged in the late 1980s and early 1990s in the wake of Sega's popular arcade driving game Out Run (1986). It is notable for the variety of its enemy sprites, and for its use of parallax scrolling. It is also notable for being one of the first video games to be launched simultaneously on two consoles.

== Gameplay ==
The object of the game is to prevent a convoy of vehicles from reaching the city of Megapolis where a terrorist attack has been planned against the 3rd International Conference for Peace. Taking control of a weaponised flying car named the Thunder Master II in pursuit of this goal, the player is presented with a combination of racing, flying and shoot 'em up gameplay elements.

The player must navigate the road to Megapolis at high speed, working their way up the convoy and destroying a wide array of opponents, ranging from armed motorcycles, cars and jeeps, to road-side cannons, bomber aircraft and robotic walkers. The ultimate aim is to reach and to disable the lead vehicle which is equipped with a nuclear weapon of mass destruction called the 'Life Thirsty'.

Despite a notable variety of enemies, the player has a limited range of abilities and power-ups available to them. The Thunder Master II vehicle is equipped with only two weapons: the basic 'ionic phaser' gun (activated with Button 1), and missiles (activated with Buttons 1 and 2 together). The player must keep the Thunder Master II fuelled by making contact with cans placed in the road: blue cans contain fuel which allow the vehicle to continue driving on the highway, and red cans contain kerosene which permit the vehicle to fly. The two types of fuel are indicated by two separate fuel gauges.

The in-game user interface displays the player's score as well as written messages, such as an indication of when the Thunder Master II is ready for take-off.

== Reception ==
The Master System version was well received. The reviewers at Mean Machines magazine praised the smoothness, the speed and the level of difficulty, and preferred the game to similar titles such as Battle Out Run and Chase H.Q. One reviewer described it as "a must for addicts of highway violence". Mean Machines awarded the Master System version an overall 82% score.

Computer and Video Games scored the Master System version 86% in 1990. Console XS reviewed the Master System version in 1992, giving it an 82% score.

The GX4000 version fared less well: the Mean Machines reviewers expressed surprise at the poverty of its graphics and gameplay in contrast to the Master System version. One reviewer stated: "The scrolling is jerky, the car moves and responds like a badly crippled slug, the road update is juddery and unconvincing, and most of the sprites look like marauding blue cabbages", concluding that playing the game was like having one's teeth pulled out. Mean Machines awarded the GX4000 version an overall 33% score.
