= Deathtrack =

1989 video game

- Developer: Dynamix
- Publisher: Activision
- Director: Jeffrey Tunnell
- Producers: Steven Ackrich; John A. S. Skeel
- Designers: Terry Ishida; Dariusz Lukaszuk
- Programmer: Dariusz Lukaszuk
- Composer: Russell Lieblich
- Platform: MS-DOS
- Release: NA: December 1989
- Genres: Racing, vehicular combat
- Mode: Single-player

DeathTrack is a first-person, futuristic racing game developed for MS-DOS by Dynamix and published by Activision in 1989. The game is set in a future America, where the player is a racer in a circuit that allows participants to attack their opponents. It included strategic upgrade mechanics, as well as different vehicles to choose from.

== Gameplay ==
There are two ways to win a race: be the first to finish the race, or be the only one to finish the race. Based in a futuristic America, the player races on various tracks across the country for money, which can be spent on armor, weapons and other modifications to protect and use against the competition. There are ten tracks in ten cities. The track for each city is unique, as is each opponent's 3D polygonal car.

The player chooses from one of three cars (either "The Hellcat" for high speed, "The Crusher" for high firepower or "The Pitbull" for heavy armor) and begins racing against other drivers. The player starts with $10,000 to spend on weapons, and earns more money by winning races. For each item the player buys, there are three variants: small/ineffective, medium/good and large/best.

== Reception ==
Computer Gaming World called DeathTrack "an outstanding new action game ... gratuitous violence at its therapeutic best", praising the graphics.

In 1996, Computer Gaming World declared Deathtrack the 124th best computer game ever released.

== Legacy ==
A Game Boy version was in the works by game developer Argonaut Software, but was unreleased.

A sequel, Death Track: Resurrection, was released on February 22, 2008 in Russia and later in North America and Europe. An Xbox 360 version of the game was expected to be released later in 2009.
