= Assault Suits Valken =

1992 video game

- North American cover art
- Developer: NCS Corp
- Publishers: JP: Masaya; NA: Konami of America; EU: Palcom
- Producer: Toshiro Tsuchida
- Designers: Akira Nakai; Keisuke Tadakuma; Saito Takahiro
- Programmers: Hideo Suzuki; Tetsuya Oya; Yukihiro Higuchi; Kawano Yukihiro
- Artist: Satoshi Urushihara
- Platforms: Super NES, PlayStation 2, Nintendo Switch
- Release: Super NES: JP: December 18, 1992; NA: April 4, 1993; PAL: 1993; PlayStation 2: JP: August 26, 2004; PAL: June 2005; Nintendo Switch: WW: March 30, 2023
- Genres: Run and gun, Platformer
- Mode: Single player

Assault Suits Valken (Note: Japanese: 重装機兵ヴァルケン, Hepburn: Jūsō Kihei Varuken), also known as Cybernator, is a 2D mecha action game developed by Masaya and released in 1992 for the Super Nintendo Entertainment System. The second entry in the Assault Suit series, it is a prequel to the first game, Target Earth. The game was localized and published overseas by Konami. The story follows Jake Brain who pilots a giant mecha and fights in a war engulfing the entire world.

== Plot ==
The game takes place in the future, during a time when Earth's fossil fuels have begun to dwindle. There is a massive war taking place all over the earth for control of these resources, as well as for territorial rights on the moon. The two warring governments, the Axis and Federation, have the ability to go into space and create giant space stations and weapons of mass destruction.

Jake is the game's protagonist. He is a soldier drafted into the Pacific States' Marine Corp and pilots a Federation Assault Suit. In the prologue text he states he only fights because he is a soldier, not concerned with patriotism or politics. Survival for a soldier means defeating the enemy. The Suit has a humanoid shape, with arms, legs, a torso, and a head. It is equipped with a variety of weapons and other special accessories, giving it full land and minor air capabilities.

Jake and his platoon, which operate from the warship Versis are tasked with destruction of Bildvorg, the most powerful mech of the Axis forces. The various missions in the game lead up to the completion of this objective. (It is piloted by Major Beldark, whom Jake meets first in mission 4 and would later meet Jake once before the final boss). Versis sends out 2 other suits, one is unnamed and another is named Apollo in stage 4, who is killed offscreen by one suit that is really fast (Beldark). Ironically in that mission the player saves an enemy suit entering the Earth's atmosphere, whereas Beldark kills Jake's ally Apollo soon after.

Although Cybernator was released after Target Earth, Cybernator takes place a century before Target Earth.

In Assault Suits Valken 2, Jake makes a cameo appearance as a 30-year-old veteran soldier who assists in battles as an NPC.

The game has two endings. The bad ending can be acquired if the player fails any mission in the game, such as failing to stop Arc Nova from falling and/or allowing the enemy space shuttle to escape in the 5th mission. In this ending, the Versis is critically damaged and most of her crew are killed, including Crea (Jake's partner), which leaves Jake devastated in the credits. The game over screen also states the player has not completed their mission. If the player succeeds in the side missions, the Versis survives and Jake returns to the carrier, the war is over and Jake and Crea embrace each other on the Versis' deck as the Cybernator suit falls into pieces.

== Development ==
Toshiro Tsuchida served as producer for the game. Afterwards, he joined G-Craft and worked on the game Front Mission.

The soundtrack, composed by Masanao Akahori, was later rearranged and released as an official soundtrack CD in Japan.

The original Japanese releases featured artwork done by Satoshi Urushihara.

Designer Satoshi Nakai was insistent on the game including destructive environments.

Cybernator was the subject of censorship during its localization. The Japanese version featured written dialog accompanied by a portrait of the speaker, but these portraits were removed during localization. There is also a scene absent in which the president of the enemy forces, whose banner is that of the European Union, after realizing that his nation has been defeated, commits suicide. Also some written dialog is taken out, which shows the soldier rescued in the fourth level being in the robot fought before the final boss. However the few human enemies in the game remain (that are minuscule in scale vs machines throughout the game) with no censorship when they are killed.

The instruction manual of the English version is also filled with inconsistent information. For example, the sixth mission takes place in the Alps, where Versis tries to fly over the mountains to reach the Allied front lines, but according to the manual, the player's aim is to raid the enemy commander's mountain retreat. Another example of inaccurate information would be concerning the laser weapon, the strongest the player would receive in the game minus the cheat weapon the Napalm Flamethrower. It stated the laser takes a long time to recharge yet it actually recharges at least as fast as the Vulcan's reload, and unlike the Vulcan the laser recharges to a full load automatically without needing to expend its power/ammo first if they stop firing it.

The instruction manual also stated the suit to be a colossal 5 stories tall and 5 tons (which is seriously underweight for a machine that tall), contrary to promo material stating it to be 4 stories tall.

== Release ==
Assault Suits Valken was released in Japan for the Super Famicom on December 12, 1992. When the game was released outside of Japan, the title was changed to Cybernator. It was released in North America in April 1993. The game received a port to the PlayStation 2 in 2004 in Europe, Australia and Japan, under the title Assault Suits Valken.

Cybernator was released on the Virtual Console in PAL regions on December 7, 2007, and in North America on December 17, 2007, both for the Wii and in North America on August 7, 2014 and in PAL regions on February 26, 2015, both for the Wii U.

In 2014, the game was re-released in Japan through the game distribution service EGG.

=== Assault Suits Valken Declassified ===
On February 20, 2023, developer M2 announced Assault Suits Valken Declassified, an updated re-release of the game for Nintendo Switch. It was released March 30, 2023. The game features a new English translation without the censorship present in Cybernator as well as new artwork by character designer Satoshi Urushihara, a digital recreation and translation of the official 80-page Japanese guidebook, interviews with the designers, exclusive pre-production artwork, save states, unlockable cheats, and an option to switch between the original and newly arranged soundtracks, along with other additional features.

== Reception ==
Reception

Review scores
| Publication | Score |
|---|---|
| Computer and Video Games | 88/100 |
| Electronic Gaming Monthly | 8/10 |
| Famitsu | 8/10, 9/10; 7/10, 8/10 |
| Game Informer | 8.5/10, 8.25/10, 8.75/10 |
| GamesMaster | 89% |
| GameZone | 88/100 |
| Official Nintendo Magazine | 94/100 |
| Super Play | 91% 90% |
| Total! | (UK) 83% (DE) 3+ |
| VideoGames & Computer Entertainment | 8/10 |
| Control | 73% |
| Marukatsu Super Famicom | 6/10, 8/10, 8/10, 8/10 |
| N-Force | 87/100 |
| Super Action | 91% |
| The Super Famicom | 83/100 |
| Super Gamer | 86% |
| Super Pro | 86/100 |

According to Famitsu, Assault Suits Valken sold 10,782 copies during its lifetime in Japan. The game received generally favorable reception from critics. GameFan's Dave Halverson and Greg Off deemed it one of the best games for the SNES, lauding its audiovisual department and story. Super Gamer praised the game's graphics, gameplay, and atmosphere.

The four reviewers of Electronic Gaming Monthly gave mixed opinions if the game was too easy or too hard, while all praised the games graphics, with two reviewers saying it showed the capabilities of the SNES hardware.

=== Retrospective ===
Retrospective reception

Aggregate score
| Aggregator | Score | | |
| Aggregator | SNES | Wii | Wii U |
|---|---|---|---|
| GameRankings | 74% (6 reviews) | | |

Review scores
| Publication | Score | | |
| Publication | SNES | Wii | Wii U |
|---|---|---|---|
| AllGame | 3.5/5 | | |
| Eurogamer | | 6/10 | |
| IGN | | 7.5/10 | |
| Nintendo Life | | 8/10 | 8/10 |

In 1996, Next Generation stated that Cybernator "was the game that introduced many U.S. gamers to classically Japanese design values - not only because it was a class title looks-wise, but also because it overflowed with action and atmosphere." The April 1996 issue of Super Play magazine listed Cybernator as the 19th best Super NES title. In 1995, Total! ranked the game 86th on their Top 100 SNES Games stating: "Another good solid blaster for fans to get their teeth into. Well worth the effort."

The Wii and Wii U re-releases received mixed-to-positive reviews. Eurogamer (UK) reviewed and gave it a score of 6/10. IGN gave it a 7.5/10. Nintendo Life reviewed the game twice, once in 2007 giving the Wii Virtual Console version an 8/10, and again in 2014 also giving an 8/10 for the Wii U eShop version.

== See also ==
- Mobile Suit Zeta Gundam
- Armored Hunter Gunhound EX
- Front Mission: Gun Hazard
- Metal Warriors
