= Vigilante 8 =

1998 video game

- North American PlayStation cover art featuring the '67 Rattler (left), '66 School Bus (middle), and the '72 Moth Truck (right)
- Developers: Luxoflux; Vicarious Visions (GBC)
- Publishers: Activision; Vatical Entertainment (GBC)
- Designers: Adrian Stephens; Peter Morawiec; Jeremy Engleman; David Goodrich; Edvard Toth
- Composers: Jeehun Hwang, Howard Drossin (PlayStation); Alexander Brandon (N64); Kelly Walker Rogers
- Platforms: PlayStation; Nintendo 64; Game Boy Color
- Release: PlayStation: NA: June 4, 1998; EU: June 26, 1998; Nintendo 64: NA: March 17, 1999; EU: March 1999; Game Boy Color: NA: December 15, 1999
- Genre: Vehicular combat
- Modes: Single-player, multiplayer

Vigilante 8 is a 1998 vehicular combat game developed by Luxoflux and published by Activision for PlayStation, Nintendo 64, and Game Boy Color. V8 began life as a port of Interstate '76, but soon spun off into its own entity. Console versions received favorable reviews, and its sequel, Vigilante 8: 2nd Offense, was quickly commissioned and released just over a year later. A remake, Vigilante 8 Arcade, was released in 2008 exclusively for Xbox 360 through Xbox Live Arcade.

== Gameplay ==
=== Home console versions ===
Gameplay screenshot of the '76 Leprechaun in action

Players combat over a number of stages located over the western United States, whether in Story or Arcade Mode. Each stage has interactive features, such as ballistic missiles and launching Aurora planes for the Area 51 level. Every vehicle is equipped with a machine gun by default, but players can add up to three out of five available weapons - mines, auto-cannons, rocket pods, mortars, and homing missiles, plus a special weapon unique to the vehicle.

Three types of special attacks can be made using each of the five standard weapons, at a bigger cost in ammunition, by performing fighting game-style movements and button presses on the control pad. These attacks may be performed during normal play or to eliminate nearly-destroyed cars in a method called "Totaling." In line with the fighting-game style element, players can also score up to six combo hits called Whammies.

There are special icons scattered across the playing field; wrenches repair damage and yellow zigzag lines temporarily jam the opponent's homing-based weapons. Certain objectives in Story Mode must be completed to help unlock the game's secret characters and stages. The PlayStation version also offers players the option to play standard music CDs during a match.

The Nintendo 64 version includes a story mode for Y The Alien and a fantasy stage called Super Dreamland 64, as well as three multiplayer modes (two vs. two, three vs. one, and deathmatch) to take advantage of the system's four control ports, and a two-player Story Mode. A 480x360 hi-res mode is available from the pause menu if the Nintendo 64 Expansion Pack is installed. The Pack also enables a hidden 640x480 mode, available via password.

=== Game Boy Color version ===
The Game Boy Color (GBC) version features five levels, each one from the console versions: Casino City, Hoover Dam, Oil Fields, Ski Resort, and Valley Farms. The game also features five game modes, each one essentially identical, with only minor changes. The game's main story mode, Road Trip, takes the player through each level. The game features three difficulty levels. The player can choose from five different weapons, as well as a unique weapon assigned to each character. The game features digitized audio and voiceovers, as well as a two-player mode made possible with the use of a Game Link Cable. Unlike the console versions, environments in the GBC version are not destructible. The game features force feedback built into the cartridge.

== Plot ==
Vigilante 8 is set in an alternate 1975. Australian terrorist Sid Burn is hired by OMAR (Oil Monopoly Alliance Regime) to dispose of all competing oil companies in the U.S. so that OMAR can establish an oil monopoly in the country. After hearing of reports of destruction by Sid Burn's gang, the Coyotes, a kind-hearted trucker named Convoy decides to take all matters into his own hands, forming a group of his own, the Vigilantes, to combat the Coyotes and stop the tyranny of OMAR.

== Characters ==
=== Vigilantes ===
They are the game's protagonists, a group of residents from the Southwest who band together to preserve law and order in the light of chaos gripping the country.

- Convoy, the Vigilantes' founder and leader, is a rugged old trucker with the manners of a cowboy. He drives a 1972 Moth Truck.
- Sheila, Convoy's rebellious niece who joins the Vigilantes despite her uncle's objections. She drives a 1974 Strider.
- John Torque, a Las Vegas high-roller and Convoy's right-hand man. He drives a 1969 Jefferson.
- Slick Clyde, a mysterious playboy whom Torque coerced into joining the Vigilantes. He drives a 1970 Clydesdale.
- Dave, an alien-obsessed hippie who somehow finds himself fighting with the Vigilantes. He drives a 1970 van.
- Chassey Blue, an FBI agent who's been assigned to investigate reports of gun-running and violent corporate warfare in the region. She drives a 1967 Rattler.

=== Coyotes ===
They are the game's antagonists, a group of mercenaries recruited by OMAR to destroy commercial installations throughout the Southwest. They use weaponry stolen from the top-secret Site-4 military base in Nevada.

- Sid Burn, the Coyotes' founder and leader, is an Australian-born professional terrorist on OMAR's payroll. He drives a 1969 Manta.
- Boogie, a disco-loving petty criminal who joins the Coyotes because he owed Sid Burn something. He drives a 1976 Leprechaun.
- Loki, a mentally-disturbed Site-4 test pilot who was discharged from the military following a flight accident. He drives a 1973 Glenn 4x4.
- Houston 3, a woman brainwashed by OMAR to become one of their assassins. She drives a 1975 Palomino.
- Beezwax, a beekeeper who was driven psychotic by the irradiation of his beehive. He drives a 1970 Stag Pickup.
- Molo, a juvenile delinquent who idolizes Sid Burn and aspires to join the Coyotes. He drives a 1966 school bus.

=== Others ===
An extraterrestrial being, named Y The Alien, appears in the game as a secret unlockable character.

== Endings ==
Each character has their own ending, which is part of a bigger story. Not all endings show a character being successful; in fact, most of the Coyote villain endings show the character facing a setback or failure of sorts and some endings depict a character defecting to the opposing faction.

Molo successfully passes the Coyotes' initiation, but loses his enthusiasm as he is given an assignment to wash Sid's car, much to his chagrin. Sid receives his payoff money from OMAR for his services, but is left stranded in the middle of nowhere because his car is out of gas. John Torque finds Sid and stashes him in his trunk.

Houston breaks free of OMAR's mind control and goes away with Convoy, who detaches the machineguns from his truck. Sheila barely misses them at a gas station and is forced to walk on the road, only for Convoy and Houston to arrive and pick her up. Clyde finds Houston's mind-control armband and, out of curiosity, wears it, resulting in him emerging as the Coyotes' new leader.

Chassey Blue embarks on a Hollywood career, releasing her self-titled movie based on the adventures of the Vigilantes. An alien ship abducts Dave in the middle of the night. In the ship, Dave is seen beating his alien host in what appears to be a game of checkers. The police arrest Boogie, who is convicted of a number of charges. Beezwax is elated at the three nuclear warheads he has acquired, only to see a stray bee land on and sting one of the warhead's fuses, triggering an explosion that kills him. Loki finds a flying saucer and is eager to fly it, but can't control the spaceship and causes it to crash, and he is later mistaken for a live alien UFO pilot.

In the N64 version of the game, the spaceship Loki flew and crashed is revealed to belong to Y The Alien, who was seeking extra fuel and parts for his ship after being stranded on Earth for some time looking for his friends.

== Development ==
Life for V8 began when Activision commissioned a port of 1997's Interstate '76 for PC, to PlayStation. I-76 was developed by an in-house team at Activision who did not have the time to work on the port, so Luxoflux was brought into the fold.

The Development Team consisted of five people - Peter Morawiec, Adrian Stephens, David Goodrich, Jeremy Engleman, and Edvard Toth. Luxoflux received no supporting code or technical assistance of any kind from Activision's in-house teams.

In order to make I-76 work on the PlayStation, some serious downsizing had to take place. As the levels became smaller and smaller, the frequency of combat encounters increased dramatically, resulting in a far more action-packed experience than the "road trip ambush" style of I-76.

As told by former Luxoflux Developer David Goodrich, at some point, Luxoflux approached Activision and suggested that the game was turning into a different, but good experience, and asked permission to make it into its own thing. Activision approved, and Vigilante 8 was born.

Vigilante 8 reuses assets from Interstate '76, including vehicles and character models; most notably, Vigilante 8 keeps the games 1970s aesthetic.

During market research, the School Bus emerged as a favorite vehicle among focus groups.

== Reception ==
Reception

Aggregate score
Aggregator	Score		
Aggregator	GBC	N64	PS
GameRankings	53%	83%	86%

Review scores
Publication	Score		
Publication	GBC	N64	PS
CNET Gamecenter	N/A	8/10	9/10
Electronic Gaming Monthly	N/A	8.5/10 (Note: Two critics of Electronic Gaming Monthly gave the Nintendo 64 version each a score of 8.5/10, one gave it 9/10, and the other gave it 8/10.)	7.875/10
EP Daily	4.5/10	8.5/10	N/A
Famitsu	N/A	N/A	28/40
Game Informer	N/A	8.5/10	7.5/10
GameFan	N/A	(S.T.) 92% 85% (Note: In GameFan's viewpoint of the Nintendo 64 version, three critics gave it each a score of 79, 88, and 87.)	93% (Note: In GameFan's viewpoint of the PlayStation version, two critics gave it each a score of 92, and the other gave it 94.) (G.N.) 92%
GameRevolution	N/A	B+	A−
GameSpot	7.1/10	7.9/10	8/10
Hyper	N/A	89%	88%
IGN	6/10	8.2/10	8/10
N64 Magazine	N/A	74%	N/A
Next Generation	N/A	4/5	4/5
Nintendo Power	7/10	7.9/10	N/A
Official U.S. PlayStation Magazine	N/A	N/A	4/5

Vigilante 8 received "favorable" reviews on all platforms except the Game Boy Color version, which received "mixed" reviews, according to the review aggregation website GameRankings. Ryan MacDonald of GameSpot noted the easy control scheme and the well-designed graphics of the PlayStation version. MacDonald noted that the game's offerings would give reason for players to "retire" from Twisted Metal 2. Shawn Smith of Electronic Gaming Monthly noted the N64 multiplayer mode offered more fun and ran relatively smoothly in high-resolution mode. Edge gave the PlayStation version seven out of ten, calling it "a competent and interesting game for anyone who enjoys trashing automobiles. But the definitive car combat would probably exploit the sensation of cars driving at speed, while enabling players to indulge in violence." Next Generation gave both the Nintendo 64 and PlayStation versions favorable reviews in two separate issues, saying that the latter version was "more fun than Interstate '76 and currently the best game of its type on PlayStation" (#45, September 1998); and later saying of the former version, "If you're craving some driving action with guns for your N64, this is the title to get" (#53, May 1999). In Japan, where the PlayStation version was ported and published by Syscom on November 12, 1998, Famitsu gave it a score of 28 out of 40.

Major Mike of GamePro said of the PlayStation version in its August 1998 issue, "Overall, Vigilante 8 is worth a test-drive rental for fans of the genre. If the controls had spent more time in the shop, V8 could have been one topnotch lean, mean driving machine." (Note: GamePro gave the PlayStation version 4.5/5 for graphics, two 4/5 scores for sound and fun factor, and 3/5 for control.) Eight issues later, Dan Elektro said that the Nintendo 64 version "could have been a hack-job port of the PlayStation code, but instead, the game's been retooled and tweaked for its new platform – and the effort shows. N64 car-combat fans, start your engines!" (Note: GamePro gave the Nintendo 64 version all 4.5/5 scores for graphics, sound, control, and fun factor.) Michael L. House of AllGame gave the PlayStation version four stars out of five, saying that it "more than makes up for the shortcomings with the fantastic shooting action and nicely designed arenas. Whether or not it's a better game than Twisted Metal 2 is up to the player; if you value shooting over everything else, it is. If you value style as the most important thing, it isn't. Nonetheless, Vigilante 8 is darn good." Later, Scott Alan Marriott gave the Game Boy Color version three stars out of five, calling it "a good game that could have been much better."

The PlayStation version was nominated for Best PlayStation Game at the 1998 CNET Gamecenter Awards; the award went to Gran Turismo.

== Sequel and remake ==
A sequel was produced, titled Vigilante 8: 2nd Offense, released for the PlayStation, Dreamcast, and Nintendo 64 in 1999. A remake for the Xbox 360, titled Vigilante 8 Arcade, was created by Isopod Labs, an independent company formed by the founders of Luxoflux. The game features a high-definition rendition of the past games plus some added multiplayer levels complete with an online mode. It was released onto Xbox Live Arcade on November 5, 2008. The developer of the two Vigilante 8 games, Luxoflux, produced a game very similar to Vigilante 8 using the Star Wars license (and the Vigilante 8 game engine), titled Star Wars: Demolition.
