= Target Earth (video game) =

1990 video game

- North American box art
- Developer: NCS
- Publishers: JP: Masaya; NA: DreamWorks
- Platform: Sega Genesis
- Release: JP: March 16, 1990; NA: May 1990
- Genre: Run and gun
- Mode: Single-player

Target Earth, released in Japan as Assault Suit Leynos (Note: Japanese: 重装機兵レイノス, Hepburn: Jūsō Kihei Reinosu) is a run and gun video game developed by NCS in 1990 for the Sega Genesis. It was re-released on the Wii’s Virtual Console, and on the Nintendo Switch's Nintendo Classics. It is the first game in the Assault Suits series.

== Plot ==
In 2201, expanding technologies have given man the power to live anywhere in space. With this backdrop, the story begins with a war between Earth (and its colonies) fighting a cyborg army returning from deep space. In the early stages, the nature or purpose of these cybernetic adversaries, named Chron, is unknown. However, it is later revealed that Chron are the survivors of a failed space expedition (Outer Space Expeditionary Party) sent by Earth one hundred years earlier.

The Earth Defense League fights to defend Earth. Its core is the Assault Suit—a twelve-foot-tall armored battle machine with powerful fighting capabilities. The player is Rex, an Assault Suit Wing commander and master at Assault Suit combat. The battle begins on Ganymede and shifts to battles in space, on the Earth, and inside enemy outposts.

== Gameplay ==
Target Earth offers 8 stages. Much of the game's mechanics fall in line with those of horizontal shooters with some subdued platforming elements. The player's performance after completing a stage dictates the weapons, armor, and accessories that are unlocked in the next stage. The game features 14 weapons, a lot of firepower in the early 1990s. The assortment of armaments increased replay value by encouraging the player to experiment with ways to defeat enemies.

While the official information for the game indicates that it is only single-player, it is possible for a second player to have limited control over enemy movement and attacks on screen.

== Release ==
Certain scenes in Target Earth were censored. For example, a scene in which a comrade does not make it back to the ship in time and burns up in the planet's atmosphere was removed. The romantic relationship between Rex and Leana was downplayed. These scenes were restored in the remake. The Western localization of the second game in the Assault Suits series, Cybernator, was subject to censorship. The game is included on the Japanese Mega Drive Mini. The US version is accessible if the system is set to English.

== Reception ==
Reception

Review scores
Publication	Score
AllGame	3/5
Beep! MegaDrive	5.8/10
Computer and Video Games	73%
Famitsu	5/10, 8/10, 7/10, 6/10
Game Informer	8/10
Mean Machines Sega	73%
VideoGames & Computer Entertainment	6/10
Console XS	69/100
MegaTech	73%
Sega Power	3/5
Sega Pro	66/100

The Japanese publication Micom BASIC Magazine ranked Assault Suit Leynos fourth in popularity in its June 1990 issue, and it received a 8.0967/10 score in a 1995 readers' poll conducted by the Japanese Sega Saturn Magazine, ranking among Sega Mega Drive titles at the number 97 spot. It garnered an average reception from critics.

== Legacy ==
Assault Suit Leynos 2 was released exclusively for the Sega Saturn in 1997, in Japan only. The gameplay is far more challenging as the shield cannot guard infinitely.

A remake by Dracue Co., Ltd. was released for the PlayStation 4 in Japan in December 2015, and in North America/EU in July 2016. A Microsoft Windows port of the remake was released in August 2016.

On June 30, 2022, the game was re-released on the Nintendo Switch's Nintendo Classics service.

== See also ==
- Armored Core
- Front Mission
- Heavy Gear
