= Metal Warriors =

1995 video game

- Developer: LucasArts
- Publisher: Konami
- Producer: Wayne Cline
- Designers: Mike Ebert; Dean Sharpe
- Programmers: Dean Sharpe; Tony Hsieh
- Artists: Harrison Fong; Leonard Robel; Mike Ebert; Chris Hockabout; Jesse Clark; Mark Ferrari
- Composers: David Warhol; Eric Swanson
- Engine: ZAMN
- Platform: Super Nintendo Entertainment System
- Release: NA: April 1995
- Genres: Action-platform, run and gun
- Modes: Single-player, multiplayer

Metal Warriors is a side-scrolling action-platform run and gun video game developed by LucasArts and published by Konami exclusively for the Super Nintendo Entertainment System in North America in April 1995. It is often confused by many to be a direct sequel to Cybernator, which was created by NCS Corporation and released earlier in 1992 on the console. Set in the year 2102 where dictator Venkar Amon has waged a war against the United Earth Government for three years, players assume the role of lieutenant Stone from the titular freedom-fighting group taking control of several mecha suits in a last-ditch effort to overthrow the Dark Axis military force on Earth. Its gameplay mainly consists of action and shooting mixed with mission-based exploration using a main seven-button configuration.

Metal Warriors was created by most of the same team who previously worked on Zombies Ate My Neighbors at LucasArts, including designer Mike Ebert and programmer Dean Sharpe, and uses an improved version of the same game engine that was previously implemented in the earlier game. Development on the project was immediately approved by Kelly Flock after release of Zombies Ate My Neighbors in 1993 to positive reviews and took influence from various mecha anime series and video games, most notably Cybernator. It was originally intended to be published by Nintendo as a first-party title during Christmas amid the 3D era before publishing duties were ultimately handled by Konami instead, who produced a limited run of copies in total as a result.

Metal Warriors garnered positive reception upon its release from critics, who praised various aspects of the title such as its presentation, visuals, gameplay and multiplayer but some of the reviewers felt divided in regards to the difficulty, sound design and lack of passwords for game saves, while many also drew comparison with Cybernator due to its similar mechanics. Nevertheless, it has since gained a cult following, in addition of being referred by publications like IGN as one of the best titles for the Super Nintendo.

== Gameplay ==
Gameplay screenshot of the first campaign level

Metal Warriors is a side-scrolling action-platform game with run and gun elements similar to Cybernator, Front Mission: Gun Hazard and Metal Mech, where players assume the role of lieutenant Stone from the titular freedom-fighting group in order to complete a series of nine missions as attempts to overthrow the Dark Axis forces led by dictator Venkar Amon and end the three-year war against Earth. During gameplay, the players are able to pilot six different types of assault suits, each one having their own melee weapons and featuring a distinctive mechanic from another, and can also use more than one suit in the same stage.

The six different suit types are the Nitro, Havoc, Prometheus, Spider, Ballistic and Drache. Each unit is equipped with a backpack mount that allows collecting and using side power-ups for their advantage. These backpack power-ups are the rocket launcher, the grenade launcher, the mine layer and a gravity inverter. Players can also collect various upgrades for the suit's primary gun that alters their shot as well as health power-ups, which instantly restore a damaged suit to full health. Both the powered-up ranged gun and the backpack items may be disabled if the suit suffers a significant amount of damage.

At any given time or when it is almost completely destroyed, players can abandon their suit and scramble around the stage to find a new one, allowing to remain in the game even if their assault suit was destroyed. While ejected from the suit, players take control of Stone, who is armed with a pistol that is useless against all mechanical enemies with the exception of soldiers and scientists lacking armor, in addition to a jetpack that enables him to fly in a similar manner to the Nitro but slower. During certain points in the game, the players would be required to eject from their suit to switch between units and activate switches to open doors. Stone can also fit into smaller spaces and scout ahead without attracting the attention of most enemies, as some of them ignore unsuited marines. However, being outside of a mech suit is an extremely risky proposition, as Stone can be instantly killed by a powerful enemy fire and enemy soldiers can also steal the player's current mech suit to use it in their favor.

A notable feature of the game is the lack of GUI, as every action is visually represented; All of the mech suits show progressive battle damage when they take on enemy fire, while Stone displays how many hit points he has remaining after taking shots from enemy soldiers. The players have a limited number of continues to keep playing before the game is over. Prior to starting a playthrough, players can choose to adjust a number of default settings at the options menu such as the main character's name, control for each mech suit and disable cutscenes. In addition to the regular single-player campaign, there is a two-player split-screen deathmatch mode, where two human players battle against each other in order to emerge as victor of the match.

== Plot ==
Metal Warriors takes place in the year 2102, where the United Earth Government is under siege from the Dark Axis military force led by the dictator Venkar Amon, who has waged a war against them for three years on Earth, however the titular freedom-fighting group equipped with robotic combat suits are the few remaining people defending the planet. Assuming the role of lieutenant Stone, players control him through a variety of missions that initially are set in space and completing objectives such as rescuing agent Marissa from Axis 5 and capturing both an enemy supply ship and a heavily guarded asteroid base in order to obtain vital resources for the group, with the latter proving to be successful enough to promote Stone from lieutenant to captain of his crew. However their recent success quickly attracts the attention of the Axis army, who engage in attacking the group's main ship with threatening enemy fire that Stone and his crew must defend with the stolen Prometheus units.

After the recent event, the group is tasked with disabling an anti-spacecraft cannon located in Alaska to ensure safe landing for air operations that would eventually lead to the removal of Axis forces on Earth. After stealing the experimental flying Drache machine from a jungle facility on Chile, fighting through the bombed-out Dorado city, capturing subterranean mining Axis installations and obtaining a command key from an enemy communication tower, the group finally reaches the Axis command center where a super weapon is rumored to be in construction, with Stone and his crew leading the final assault. Once Stone reaches the depths of the center, he confronts Venkar Amon and defeats his super weapon in a battle between fully mobile flying armored suits, however Amon tries to escape with a hijacked Nitro suit but he dies incinerated alongside the base. Stone safely escapes from the explosion but his Nitro suit is wrecked after landing on the ground, marking an end for both Dark Axis and the war.

== Development and release ==
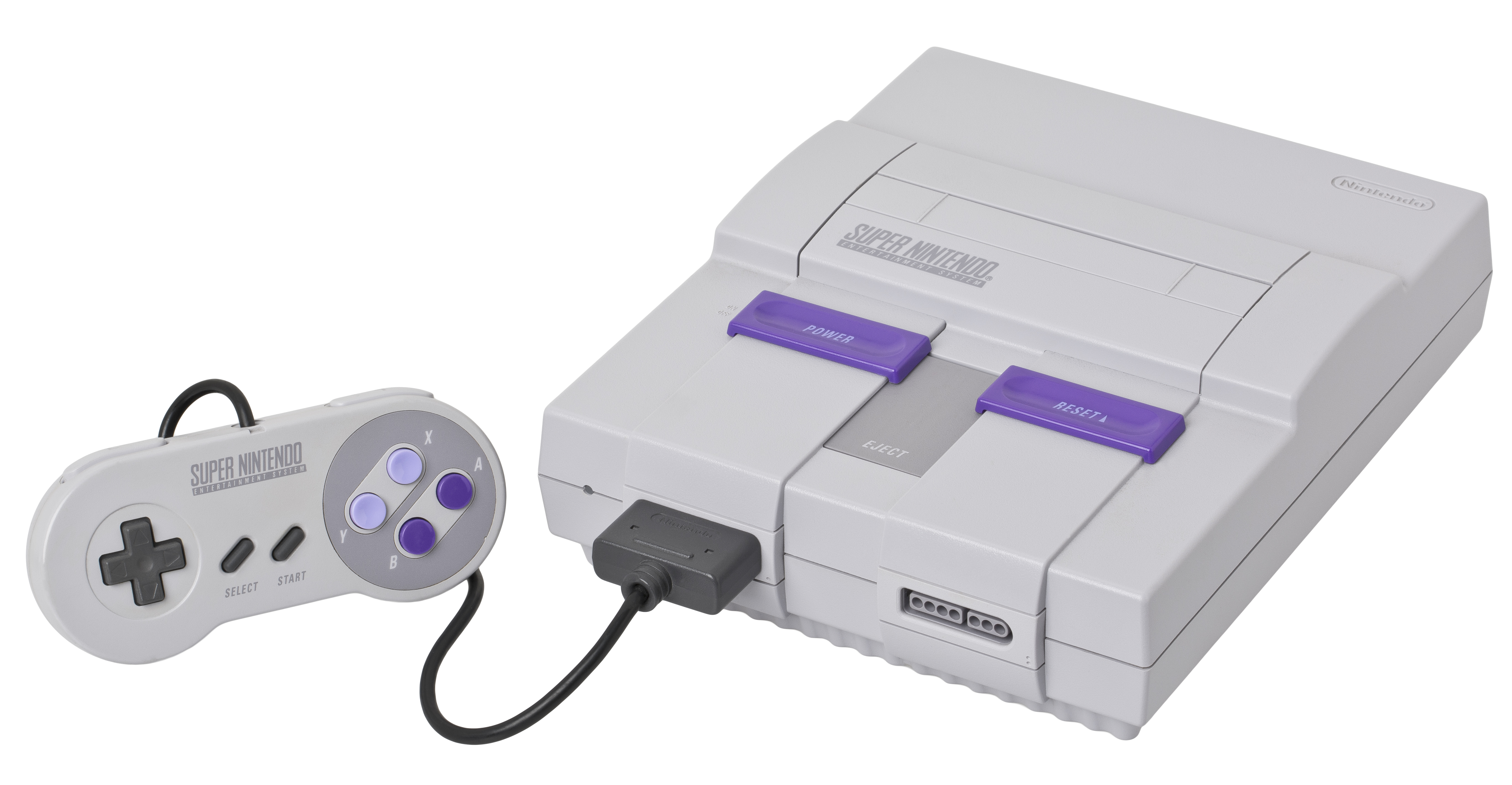
Metal Warriors was developed exclusively for the Super NES by most of the original Zombies Ate My Neighbors team and both titles share the same game engine.

Metal Warriors was developed by most of the same team headed by Mike Ebert and Dean Sharpe who previously worked on Zombies Ate My Neighbors at the American studio LucasArts. Ebert had been a fan of mecha anime series like Gundam and Armored Trooper Votoms, whose fascination with said genre would eventually lead him to form the anime-focused magazine Animag: The Magazine of Japanese Animation before venturing into the video game industry and influenced his decision to create a mecha-themed game project. LucasArts' Kelly Flock immediately greenlighted work on the project after development process of Zombies Ate My Neighbors went smoothly without major issues and the positive critical reception it garnered, with Ebert himself claiming to be surprised at the company's decision.

Metal Warriors shares the same game engine written by former Sega of America technical director Toshiyasu Morita as with Zombies Ate My Neighbors, albeit modified and improved upon its previous iteration, which allowed its creation process to go fast and smoothly. Artist Harrison Fong, who previously worked on Dark Horse Comics' limited series Mecha, was responsible for designing many of the mechs and cutscenes in the game, while Sharpe and Tony Hsieh were also responsible for the programming work in the project as well, in addition to composers David Warhol and Eric Swanson co-writing the soundtrack, among other people collaborating in its development. It was also influenced by several games such as Blaster Master, Super Mario World and most notably Cybernator. Ebert has explained in recent years that the team had originally desired to implement a split-screen two-player co-op mode in Zombies Ate My Neighbors but it was not possible due to the engine not being fast enough at the time, however they were able to do so on the project.

The game originally was previewed by Nintendo Power in their July 1994 issue under the title Battledroids, which proved to be difficult to obtain due to being an official terminology from George Lucas' Star Wars. It was initially intended to be published by Nintendo, who requested the team several features to be implemented before release but Ebert stated that due to the arrival of the PlayStation and subsequent decrease in the 16-bit market for Super Nintendo titles led to the former terminating all upcoming Christmas releases under their brand, including the game and some of its requested features were later scrapped, however there were rumors of Nintendo dropping the deal due to similarities with the aforementioned Cybernator. Its development was quickly rushed to completion and publishing duties were instead handled by Konami, who requested the game to be renamed as Metal Warriors and produced an estimated run of 50,000 copies in total, although Sharpe has stated the team was happy in getting the game on store shelves regardless of the events.

Metal Warriors was first showcased to the public during Winter CES in 1995, before being released exclusively in North America on April of the same year. It is often confused for a direct sequel to Cybernator by many people, as it bears some similarities to that game and both were published by Konami in the west. Sharpe has since stated that a version for the Sega Genesis would not have been possible without his involvement due to several programming tricks used in order to run the game on the Super NES, before the idea was ultimately scrapped after Nintendo picked up the project for release. Shortly after Metal Warriors was published in stores, both Sharpe and Ebert would depart from LucasArts because of internal issues that occurred within the company with Flock's departure to form their own studio, Big Ape Productions. A Game Boy Advance conversion was in development by animator Leonard Robel at LucasArts without the original team but it was never released due to internal conflicts.

== Reception ==
Reception

Review scores
Publication	Score
Electronic Gaming Monthly	9/10, 8/10, 7.5/10, 8/10
Game Informer	9/10, 8.75/10
Game Players	74%
GameFan	80/100, 71/100, 77/100
Next Generation	3/5
Official Nintendo Magazine	83/100
Total!	2+
Flux	A
VideoGames	8/10

Metal Warriors was positively received upon release, earning praise for its level designs, graphics, two-player deathmatch mode, diverse selection of playable mechs and ability to leave one's mech suit. Game Informer said that this last feature "adds a whole new level of playing to the game, making you think through the missions on two levels; where can I take my mech and where can I take my pilot." Since its initial release, it has gained a cult following. In 2011, IGN placed the title on their Top 100 SNES Games list at #33, praising its originality and two-player versus mode.

Most critics described the game's difficulty as extremely challenging without being frustrating, though a few complained at the lack of a password system. VideoGames, which was most vehement about this complaint, nonetheless added that "Metal Warriors is still a white-hot game", and applauded it for giving "a lot of leeway" in how the players can explore the stages and engage enemies.

Some critics noted Metal Warriors is similar to earlier games, though this typically did not lower their opinion of it. The four reviewers of Electronic Gaming Monthly, for example, acknowledged that the game is very similar to Cybernator, but judged it to be an outstanding game due to the heavy challenge and simple controls. GamePro's Captain Squideo likewise called the game "a new and improved Cybernator", praising the detailed and uncluttered graphics, variety of equipment, and the general fun of blowing up enemies. Next Generation stated that "there's not an original thought in Metal Warriors' cybernetic head, but it's done well for what it is."
