= Vigilante 8: 2nd Offense =

1999 video game

- Developer: Luxoflux
- Publisher: Activision
- Composers: Christian A. Salyer, Eric Klein, Howard Drossin (Dreamcast/PlayStation); Alexander Brandon, Dan Gardopee (N64)
- Platforms: PlayStation, Dreamcast, Nintendo 64
- Release: PlayStation: NA: December 1, 1999; EU: December 31, 1999; Dreamcast: NA: December 22, 1999; EU: February 18, 2000; Nintendo 64: NA: February 1, 2000; EU: February 25, 2000
- Genre: Vehicular combat
- Modes: Single-player, multiplayer

Vigilante 8: 2nd Offense is a 1999 vehicular combat game developed by Luxoflux and published by Activision for PlayStation, Dreamcast and Nintendo 64. It is the sequel to Vigilante 8.

== Gameplay ==
As in Vigilante 8, players control a vehicle and eliminate all other vehicles in the arena with the use of weapons and upgrades. The player can choose to play through a story mode, Quest Mode, or play with an assorted number of bots in Arcade mode. The game also offers a new two-player cooperative mode and a Grand Melee Deathmatch mode, wherein the player endures attacks by multiple AI opponents. 2nd Offense introduced the "Salvage Points" system, which allows the player to upgrade their vehicle by collecting Salvage Points from destroyed opponents, improving the vehicle's offense, defense, speed, and targeting abilities. The vehicle's external appearance is altered with more Salvage Points and turns into a completely different design when it is fully upgraded. Special icons scattered over the game zone allows the player to improve mobility over certain environments, such as hover pods, skis, and outboard motors. The original game's five standard weapons – mines, rockets, autocannons, homing missiles, and mortars – are now joined by flamethrowers, with each weapon now capable of performing three special attacks using movements on the control pad. The Totaling and Whammy combat modes from the first game are also retained, as is the concept of stages with interactive features.

Completing secondary objectives in Quest Mode would also help unlock secret characters. Aside from being able to play music CDs, the player can also access the Vigilante 8 levels for multiplayer matches by inserting the game disc.

== Plot ==
The game is set in September 1977, two years after the events of Vigilante 8. The southwestern United States has become peaceful in the wake of the Coyotes' defeat, but the Oil Monopoly Alliance Regime (OMAR) continues to dominate most of the world's petroleum market, well into the 21st century. With new Coyotes leader Slick Clyde leading OMAR during the twilight of his life by 2017, Clyde thinks that a failure to conquer America (which has adopted nuclear and clean energy) would be his biggest mistake. He plans to change history by stealing an prototype time machine from Stanford University's quantum physics lab, travel back to the 1970s, and eliminate the Vigilantes to ensure OMAR's supremacy.

=== Characters ===
Many of the characters who previously appeared in Vigilante 8 return in the game, and are joined by a cast of new characters. However, not all playable characters have their own Quest Mode campaign.

The game's protagonists are the Vigilantes, which had been all but disbanded following the events of the first game. Their leader, Convoy, has married ex-Coyote Houston and now runs a trucking business, but is apparently killed in an ambush on September 17, 1977, presumably by the Coyotes. Also returning from the first game as members of the Vigilantes are gambler-turned-bounty hunter John Torque and Convoy's niece Sheila. The Vigilantes are joined by the Flying All-Star Trio (Team FAST), black stunt performers in search of their missing sister, and Dave's Cultsmen, a trio of hippie followers idolizing Vigilante 8 character Dave.

The game's main antagonist is ex-Vigilante Slick Clyde, who has become the Coyotes' new leader after finding Houston's old mind-control armband. His underlings are Japanese orphan Obake, whose real name is Keiko Uzumi, and cyborg Dallas 13, who is in fact Uzumi's close friend Darius, who disappeared after a mistake during the Stanford University heist. Sid Burn's former lover, arms smuggler Nina Loco, is a new addition to the Coyotes, having safeguarded most of the advanced weapons they stole in the first game. Boogie and Molo are the only returning Coyotes from the first game; Nina breaks Boogie out of jail, while Clyde frees Molo, who is being transported to a correctional center by a prison bus, giving him the bus as his personal vehicle.

The game also introduces a third faction, the Drifters: individuals who somehow get caught in the Vigilante–Coyote war, but are not affiliated with either faction. They include Chrono Police (ChronoPol) agent R. Chase, who is investigating Clyde and OMAR's activities; former FBI agent Chassey Blue, whose Hollywood career is in shambles following a scandal the Bureau engineered to put her back on the job; former NASA astronaut Bob O; Native American shaman Dusty Earth; doomsday preacher Padre Destino; and The Garbage Man.

=== Ending ===
As with the previous game, each playable character with a Quest Mode campaign has their own endings, and each of these endings is connected to tell the whole story.

Dallas 13 captures Houston, who fights back and kills him. Using Dallas 13's time-machine, Houston goes back to stop Convoy from driving off a cliff as the Coyotes attack. Convoy activates special cannons in his truck and goes into battle. The Team FAST siblings reunite with their sister Houston, whom they have never seen since 1973, when she was abducted from a gymnastics class (presumably by OMAR agents).

Later, Agent R. Chase corners a defiant Slick Clyde. The Coyote leader fights back and is on the verge of killing him until Obake incapacitates Clyde and leaves with him through the time warp. Now back in 2017, Slick wakes up in his car with Obake on the wheel. Having discovered the truth about Dallas 13's real identity and how Clyde killed her parents, she maneuvers the bomb-laden car on a collision course with OMAR headquarters, where Slick dies in the explosion. OMAR's collapse prompts Uzumi to step up and unveil her father's clean energy technology to the world. Sulking over his failure to arrest Clyde, Chase smashes his ChronoPol badge and finally meets his childhood crush, Chassey Blue (who also threw away her FBI ID). Since his ChronoPol badge is destroyed, Chase is declared AWOL, and he drives off with Chassey as other ChronoPol agents go after them.

Sheila enters the FBI Academy with Chassey's blessing and graduates. Her first assignment is to take down Molo, who thought Chassey was chasing him.

Under the guise of a road accident victim, the Garbage Man runs off with Bob O's lunar rover. The Garbage Man is revealed to be Vigilante 8 secret character Y The Alien, who then cannibalizes the rover to get parts for his spaceship. Bob O, revealed to be a NASA lab chimp, joins Y and jumps into the spaceship as it is about to launch.

Padre Destino is vaporized when a portal appears in the course of his prayers and shoots a blast of flame at him.

With the second defeat of the Coyotes, Nina decides to give the remaining Site 4 heavy weapons to a Mexican gang and rendezvous with them for the payoff. However, the shipment is actually a bomb that destroys the gang's limousine. Expecting to get away, Nina stops when she encounters John Torque, who has blocked the road and is about to capture her. After stashing Nina in the trunk of his car, Torque goes to the nearest jail to collect his bounty. He later changes his mind and heads to an island paradise for a vacation, where Convoy and Houston join the two.

== Development ==
Vigilante 8: 2nd Offense was announced in 1998, initially with the title Vigilante 12, referring to the game's additional four characters compared to eight characters in its predecessor. A school bus was featured in the game during development, but Activision expected to replace it with a prison bus because of "sensitivity to violence". The Nintendo 64 version had production issues in its development, moving the release date to January, then February 2000.

== Printed media ==
Brady Games released an official strategy guide on December 6, 1999. Written by Bart Farkas, the guide features all character information, walkthroughs, and cheat codes for all three releases of the game.

In addition, Chaos! Comics joined forces with Activision to release a 2nd Offense comic book. The comic further details plot elements that were barely tackled in the game, such as the aftermath of the Stanford University heist and Nina's rescue of Boogie. Although there was a preview issue, the series did not advance after issue #1.

== Reception ==
Reception

Aggregate score
Aggregator	Score		
Aggregator	Dreamcast	N64	PS
GameRankings	79%	73%	82%

Review scores
Publication	Score		
Publication	Dreamcast	N64	PS
AllGame	3.5/5	3.5/5	4/5
CNET Gamecenter	8/10	7/10	8/10
Electronic Gaming Monthly	7.875/10 (Note: In Electronic Gaming Monthly's review of the Dreamcast version, one critic gave it 8.5/10, two others gave it each a score of 8/10, and another gave it 7/10.)	N/A	N/A
EP Daily	8/10	7/10	8/10
Famitsu	25/40	N/A	29/40
Game Informer	8/10	8/10	7.75/10
GameFan	85%	74% (Note: In GameFan's viewpoint of the Nintendo 64 version, three critics gave it each a score of 78, 71, and 74.)	N/A
GameRevolution	B+	B	B+
GameSpot	7.7/10	7.7/10	7.5/10
GameSpy	7.5/10	N/A	N/A
IGN	8.6/10	8/10	8.2/10
N64 Magazine	N/A	61%	N/A
Next Generation	2/5	N/A	N/A
Official U.S. PlayStation Magazine	N/A	N/A	3/5

The PlayStation and Dreamcast versions received "favorable" reviews, while the Nintendo 64 version received "average" reviews, according to the review aggregation website GameRankings. IGN said that the PlayStation version has improved in terms of car and environment variety, the physics engine, and gameplay, but the missions seem trite, adding that the game also bested Twisted Metal 4. Joe Fielder of GameSpot lauded the same console version's upgrade system and the variety of songs in the game soundtrack, but was not as approving of the "aggravated" physics model and the graphics, which are just the same as the first game. GameSpot and Game Informer gave the Nintendo 64 version positive reviews while it was still in development. However, Greg Orlando of NextGen summed up the review of the Dreamcast version in just three words: "We take offense." In Japan, where the PlayStation version was localized and published by Syscom under the name Vigilante 8: 2nd Battle (ヴィジランテ8 〜セカンドバトル〜, Vijirante 8 〜Sekando Batoru〜) on February 24, 2000, followed by the Dreamcast version on March 23, Famitsu gave it a score of 29 out of 40 for the former, and 25 out of 40 for the latter.

Four-Eyed Dragon of GamePro said, "As the first of its kind in the vehicle combat genre on the Dreamcast, Vigilante 8: 2nd Offense tears up the road with extreme and fun automobile mayhem. Don't miss this game—it's the car battle of champions." (Note: GamePro gave the Dreamcast version 4.5/5 for graphics, and three 5/5 scores for sound, control, and fun factor.) In one review, Dan Elektro said of the Nintendo 64 version, "When it comes to fast driving and faster shooting, Vigilante 8: 2nd Offense succeeds like no other N64 game. It's well worth the ride." (Note: GamePro gave the Nintendo 64 version three 4/5 scores for graphics, sound, and control, and 4.5/5 for fun factor in one review.) In another review, The Freshman said of the same console version, "The first V8 was revolutionary, and the DC version of 2nd Offense looks very nice, but this particular incarnation could use a little work. If you must have every car-combat game out there, get this one, but most gamers will find other games that better satisfy their urge to destroy." (Note: GamePro gave the Nintendo 64 version two 4.5/5 scores for graphics and sound, 3/5 for control, and 3.5/5 for fun factor in another review.) In one review, Dan Elektro said of the PlayStation version, "With a mix of old and new characters, wild new levels, and the advantage of hindsight, Vigilante 8: 2nd Offense pours on the power. This year, it's enough to take the car combat crown." (Note: GamePro gave the PlayStation version 4/5 for graphics, 5/5 for sound, and two 4.5/5 scores for control and fun factor in one review.) In another review, iBot said of the same console version, "In the battle of vehicular combat games, Vigilante 8: 2nd Offense puts up some stiff competition to Twisted Metal 4, and V8's superior controls and futuristic extras will keep you coming for seconds." (Note: GamePro gave the PlayStation version 3.5/5 for graphics, 3/5 for sound, and two 4/5 scores for control and fun factor in another review.)

Despite positive reviews, Vigilante 8: 2nd Offense failed to sell well against its competitor, Twisted Metal 4. In October 2000, Activision declined to comment on a report that it had no plans to continue the series on the PlayStation 2 or any other new consoles.
