= List of WWE 2K video games =

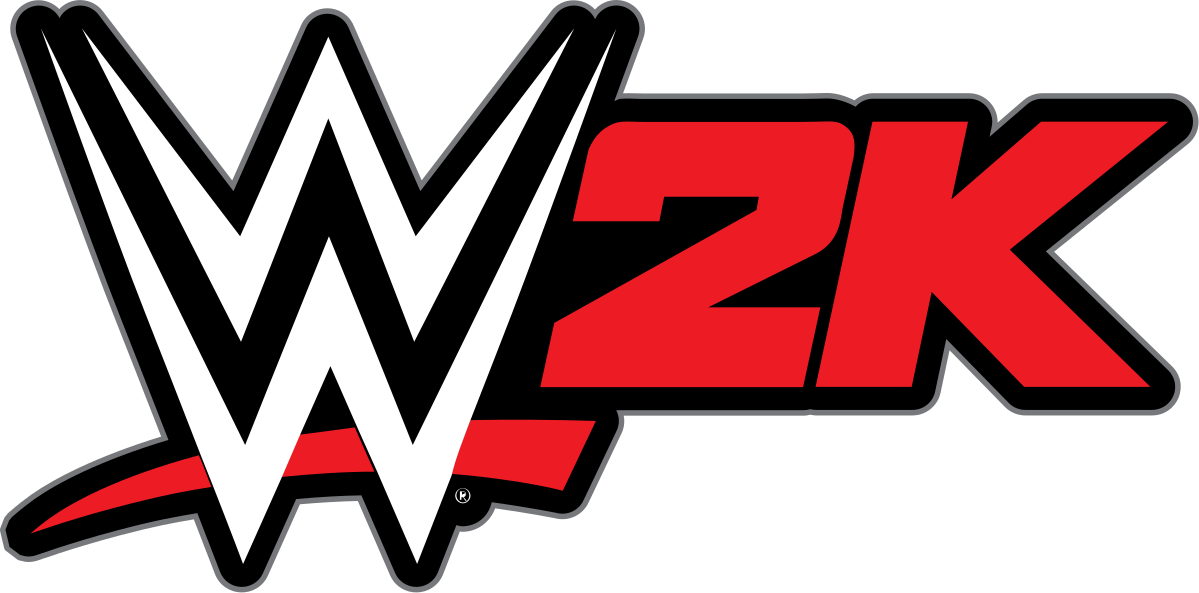
The 2K Sports logo for the WWE series

The WWE series (currently branded as WWE 2K; and formerly known as SmackDown!, SmackDown vs. Raw, or simply WWE) is a series of professional wrestling video games based on the American professional wrestling promotion WWE. The series was originally published by THQ until 2013, when Take-Two Interactive's 2K Sports took over. From 2000 to 2018, the series was primarily developed by Yuke's; Visual Concepts has been the lead developer since 2019. Initially exclusive to Sony's PlayStation video game consoles, the series would expand to all seventh generation consoles by 2008. The series is among the best-selling video game franchises with 47 million copies shipped as of 2009.

The WWE game engine was originally based on that used by Yuke's Toukon Retsuden and Rumble Roses series. Yuke's also published the WWE series in Japan, under the title of Exciting Pro Wrestling. With the release of WWE SmackDown vs. Raw 2007 in 2006, THQ took over as the Japanese publisher and the series adopted the western name.

== Titles ==
=== SmackDown! series ===
Game	Details
WWF SmackDown! Original release date(s): NA: March 2, 2000; EU: April 14, 2000; JP: August 3, 2000	Release years by system: 2000—PlayStation
WWF SmackDown! Original release date(s): NA: March 2, 2000; EU: April 14, 2000; JP: August 3, 2000	Notes: Known in Japan as Exciting Pro Wrestling; Cover art features Chyna, The Rock, Billy Gunn and Mankind
WWF SmackDown! 2: Know Your Role Original release date(s): NA: November 21, 2000; EU: December 1, 2000; JP: January 25, 2001	Release years by system: 2000—PlayStation
WWF SmackDown! 2: Know Your Role Original release date(s): NA: November 21, 2000; EU: December 1, 2000; JP: January 25, 2001	Notes: Known in Japan as Exciting Pro Wrestling 2; NTSC cover art features Chris Jericho, The Rock, Triple H and The Undertaker; PAL cover art features The Rock, Triple H and Chyna
WWF SmackDown! Just Bring It Original release date(s): EU: November 16, 2001; NA: November 18, 2001; JP: January 24, 2002	Release years by system: 2001—PlayStation 2
WWF SmackDown! Just Bring It Original release date(s): EU: November 16, 2001; NA: November 18, 2001; JP: January 24, 2002	Notes: Known in Japan as Exciting Pro Wrestling 3; Was the first WWF video game released on the PlayStation 2; Was the final video game released under the WWF acronym, as the World Wrestling Federation (WWF) changed their name to World Wrestling Entertainment (WWE).; Cover art features The Rock mainly. Other wrestlers featured in the background are Triple H, Kurt Angle and Spike Dudley
WWE SmackDown! Shut Your Mouth Original release date(s): NA: October 31, 2002; EU: November 15, 2002; JP: February 6, 2003	Release years by system: 2002—PlayStation 2
WWE SmackDown! Shut Your Mouth Original release date(s): NA: October 31, 2002; EU: November 15, 2002; JP: February 6, 2003	Notes: Known in Japan as Exciting Pro Wrestling 4; Was the first video game released under the WWE acronym, due to the World Wrestling Federation (WWF) changing their name to World Wrestling Entertainment (WWE).; NTSC cover art features Kurt Angle, Brock Lesnar, Triple H, Chris Jericho and Booker T; PAL cover art features The Rock, Hulk Hogan, Rob Van Dam and Jeff Hardy
WWE SmackDown! Here Comes the Pain Original release date(s): NA: October 27, 2003; EU: November 7, 2003; JP: January 29, 2004	Release years by system: 2003—PlayStation 2
WWE SmackDown! Here Comes the Pain Original release date(s): NA: October 27, 2003; EU: November 7, 2003; JP: January 29, 2004	Notes: Known in Japan as Exciting Pro Wrestling 5; NTSC cover art features Brock Lesnar mainly. Other wrestlers featured in background are Rey Mysterio, Matt Hardy, John Cena, The Undertaker, and Torrie Wilson; First and only installment that takes its subtitle from a source other than The Rock (Brock Lesnar).; PAL cover art exclusively features Brock Lesnar

=== SmackDown vs. Raw series ===
Game	Details
WWE SmackDown! vs. Raw Original release date(s): NA: November 2, 2004; EU: November 12, 2004; JP: February 3, 2005	Release years by system: 2004—PlayStation 2
WWE SmackDown! vs. Raw Original release date(s): NA: November 2, 2004; EU: November 12, 2004; JP: February 3, 2005	Notes: Known in Japan as Exciting Pro Wrestling 6: SmackDown! vs. RAW; Was the first video game released under the SmackDown! vs. RAW name.; Cover art exclusively features Vince McMahon
WWE SmackDown! vs. Raw 2006 Original release date(s): EU: November 11, 2005; NA: November 14, 2005; JP: February 2, 2006	Release years by system: 2005—PlayStation 2, PlayStation Portable
WWE SmackDown! vs. Raw 2006 Original release date(s): EU: November 11, 2005; NA: November 14, 2005; JP: February 2, 2006	Notes: Known in Japan as Exciting Pro Wrestling 7: SmackDown! vs. RAW 2006, and the last title to use Exciting Pro Wrestling name in Japan; Was the first video game in the series to include a year in its title.; Was the first game in the series to be released to a handheld console.; Cover art features Batista and John Cena
WWE SmackDown vs. Raw 2007 Original release date(s): EU: November 10, 2006; NA: November 14, 2006; AU: November 16, 2006; JP: January 25, 2007	Release years by system: 2006—PlayStation 2, PlayStation Portable, Xbox 360
WWE SmackDown vs. Raw 2007 Original release date(s): EU: November 10, 2006; NA: November 14, 2006; AU: November 16, 2006; JP: January 25, 2007	Notes: A PlayStation 3 version was also planned, but was canceled mid-way into production.; From this game onwards, the exclamation mark from the title was removed.; NTSC and Australian cover art features Triple H mainly. Other wrestlers featured in the background are Rey Mysterio, John Cena, Torrie Wilson and Batista; PAL cover art exclusively features Triple H
WWE SmackDown vs. Raw 2008 Original release date(s): EU: November 9, 2007; NA: November 13, 2007; AU: November 15, 2007; JP: February 14, 2008	Release years by system: 2007—Mobile, Nintendo DS, PlayStation 2, PlayStation 3, PlayStation Portable, Wii, Xbox 360
WWE SmackDown vs. Raw 2008 Original release date(s): EU: November 9, 2007; NA: November 13, 2007; AU: November 15, 2007; JP: February 14, 2008	Notes: Nintendo DS version was developed by Amaze Entertainment.; Cover art features The Undertaker, John Cena, and Bobby Lashley; Chris Benoit, his signature Crippler Crossface move, other signature moves, and entrances were removed from the finished game, as Benoit was originally a playable character. This was due to the double-murder and suicide incident.; Starting with Smackdown vs. Raw 2010, the move was reinstated as ‘Crossface’.
WWE SmackDown vs. Raw 2009 Original release date(s): AU: November 6, 2008; EU: November 7, 2008; NA: November 9, 2008; JP: January 22, 2009	Release years by system: 2008—Mobile, Nintendo DS, PlayStation 2, PlayStation 3, PlayStation Portable, Wii, Xbox 360
WWE SmackDown vs. Raw 2009 Original release date(s): AU: November 6, 2008; EU: November 7, 2008; NA: November 9, 2008; JP: January 22, 2009	Notes: Nintendo DS version was developed by Tose.; Cover art features D-Generation X (Triple H and Shawn Michaels)
WWE SmackDown vs. Raw 2010 Original release date(s): NA: October 20, 2009; AU: October 22, 2009; EU: October 23, 2009; JP: January 28, 2010	Release years by system: 2009—Mobile, Nintendo DS, PlayStation 2, PlayStation 3, PlayStation Portable, Wii, Xbox 360, iOS
WWE SmackDown vs. Raw 2010 Original release date(s): NA: October 20, 2009; AU: October 22, 2009; EU: October 23, 2009; JP: January 28, 2010	Notes: Nintendo DS version was developed by Tose.; Cover art features Edge, The Undertaker, John Cena, Randy Orton and Rey Mysterio
WWE SmackDown vs. Raw 2011 Original release date(s): NA: October 26, 2010; AU: October 28, 2010; EU: October 29, 2010; JP: February 3, 2011	Release years by system: 2010—PlayStation 2, PlayStation 3, PlayStation Portable, Wii, Xbox 360
WWE SmackDown vs. Raw 2011 Original release date(s): NA: October 26, 2010; AU: October 28, 2010; EU: October 29, 2010; JP: February 3, 2011	Notes: This was the final game to be released under the SmackDown! vs. RAW name. It was also the last installment for the PlayStation 2 and PlayStation Portable platforms.; American and Australian cover art features Big Show, John Cena and The Miz; European cover features The Undertaker, Randy Orton and Sheamus; Canadian cover art features Bret Hart, The Undertaker, Edge; Mexican cover art features The Undertaker, Rey Mysterio, Triple H; "Lord of Darkness Special Edition" cover art features The Undertaker
WWE SmackDown vs. Raw Online Original release date(s): Cancelled	Release years by system: 2011—Microsoft Windows (cancelled)
WWE SmackDown vs. Raw Online Original release date(s): Cancelled	Notes: Was being developed specifically for South Korea and other Asian countries.

=== WWE series ===
Game	Details
WWE '12 Original release date(s): NA: November 22, 2011; AU: November 24, 2011; EU: November 25, 2011; JP: January 26, 2012	Release years by system: 2011—PlayStation 3, Xbox 360, Wii
WWE '12 Original release date(s): NA: November 22, 2011; AU: November 24, 2011; EU: November 25, 2011; JP: January 26, 2012	Notes: Was the first video game released under the WWE name.; Cover art for the normal and Wrestlemania Edition feature Randy Orton. Cover art for the collector's edition features The Rock (People's Edition). Mexican cover art features Sin Cara.
WWE '13 Original release date(s): NA: October 30, 2012; AU: November 1, 2012; EU: November 2, 2012	Release years by system: 2012—PlayStation 3, Xbox 360, Wii
WWE '13 Original release date(s): NA: October 30, 2012; AU: November 1, 2012; EU: November 2, 2012	Notes: This was the last game published by THQ. It was also the last WWE game to be released on the Wii; as well as the final WWE game on any Nintendo console until 2K18's release on the Switch.; Cover art features CM Punk. A "fake" cover featuring John Laurinaitis was also revealed during Monday Night RAW and could be printed off of WWE.com. The Austin 3:16 Collector's Edition features Stone Cold Steve Austin on the cover.

=== WWE 2K series ===
Game	Details
WWE 2K14 Original release date(s): NA: October 29, 2013; AU: October 31, 2013; EU: November 1, 2013	Release years by system: 2013—PlayStation 3, Xbox 360
WWE 2K14 Original release date(s): NA: October 29, 2013; AU: October 31, 2013; EU: November 1, 2013	Notes: This is the first game published by Take-Two Interactive's 2K Sports label.; Cover art features The Rock. An alternate cover art features Daniel Bryan which was included in all copies of the retail version of the game. The collector's Phenom Edition features The Undertaker's 'TX' logo on the cover.
WWE 2K15 Original release date(s): NA: October 28, 2014; AU: October 30, 2014; EU: October 31, 2014	Release years by system: 2014—PlayStation 3, PlayStation 4, Xbox 360, Xbox One, Mobile; 2015—Microsoft Windows
WWE 2K15 Original release date(s): NA: October 28, 2014; AU: October 30, 2014; EU: October 31, 2014	Notes: This is the first WWE game made for eighth generation consoles and the first game in the series to be released for PC.; The PC version was not released in physical format. It was distributed digitally via Steam.; This is the first game in the series to be released on five major gaming platforms.; This is the first game to feature WWE's new logo revealed in 2014.; Cover art features John Cena. The collector's Hulkamania Edition features Hulk Hogan on the cover.
WWE 2K16 Original release date(s): NA: October 27, 2015; AU: October 29, 2015; EU: October 30, 2015	Release years by system: 2015—PlayStation 3, PlayStation 4, Xbox 360, Xbox One; 2016—Microsoft Windows
WWE 2K16 Original release date(s): NA: October 27, 2015; AU: October 29, 2015; EU: October 30, 2015	Notes: Cover art features Stone Cold Steve Austin.
WWE 2K17 Original release date(s): WW: October 11, 2016; JP: March 9, 2017	Release years by system: 2016—PlayStation 3, PlayStation 4, Xbox 360, Xbox One; 2017—Microsoft Windows
WWE 2K17 Original release date(s): WW: October 11, 2016; JP: March 9, 2017	Notes: Cover art features Brock Lesnar.; Cover art for the collector's NXT edition features Aiden English, Apollo Crews, Big Cass, Blake, Dana Brooke, Enzo Amore, Jason Jordan, Buddy Murphy, Simon Gotch, Dash Wilder, Bayley, Alexa Bliss, Shinsuke Nakamura, Finn Bálor, Scott Dawson, Asuka, Nia Jax, Sami Zayn, and Samoa Joe.; This is the first game in 2K series not to feature Single Player Story and Campaign modes (as Hall of Famer Showcase DLC was later added).; This was also the final installment for the WWE video games to be released on the PlayStation 3 and Xbox 360 platforms.
WWE 2K18 Original release date(s): WW: October 13, 2017 (Deluxe); WW: October 17, 2017; JP: October 19, 2017; WW: December 6, 2017 (Nintendo Switch)	Release years by system: 2017—PlayStation 4, Xbox One, Nintendo Switch, Microsoft Windows
WWE 2K18 Original release date(s): WW: October 13, 2017 (Deluxe); WW: October 17, 2017; JP: October 19, 2017; WW: December 6, 2017 (Nintendo Switch)	Notes: Cover art features Seth Rollins.; Collector's "Cena 'Nuff" Edition feature's various logos of John Cena.; This is the first video game under WWE 2K Banner released only on eighth generation hardware as well as the first released on PC alongside console counterparts.; First game in the series to be released on a Nintendo console since WWE '13, also the only one to be released on the Nintendo Switch
WWE 2K19 Original release date(s): WW: October 5, 2018 (Deluxe); WW: October 9, 2018; JP: October 11, 2018	Release years by system: 2018—PlayStation 4, Xbox One, Microsoft Windows
WWE 2K19 Original release date(s): WW: October 5, 2018 (Deluxe); WW: October 9, 2018; JP: October 11, 2018	Notes: Cover art features AJ Styles.; Last game in the series to be developed by Yuke's.
WWE 2K20 Original release date(s): WW: October 22, 2019	Release years by system: 2019—PlayStation 4, Xbox One, Microsoft Windows
WWE 2K20 Original release date(s): WW: October 22, 2019	Notes: Cover art features Becky Lynch and Roman Reigns.; First in the series to be developed solely by Visual Concepts.
WWE 2K22 Original release date(s): WW: March 11, 2022	Release years by system: 2022— PlayStation 4, PlayStation 5, Xbox One, Xbox Series X/S, Microsoft Windows
WWE 2K22 Original release date(s): WW: March 11, 2022	Notes: Cover art features Rey Mysterio.; Cover art for the nWo 4-Life Edition features New World Order members "Hollywood" Hulk Hogan, Scott Hall, Kevin Nash, and X-Pac.; First game in the series to be released in one year rather than a year ahead.; This is the first WWE game made for ninth generation consoles.
WWE 2K23 Original release date(s): WW: March 14, 2023	Release years by system: 2023— PlayStation 4, PlayStation 5, Xbox One, Xbox Series X/S, Microsoft Windows
WWE 2K23 Original release date(s): WW: March 14, 2023	Notes: Cover art features John Cena; First title to have one superstar grace every version of cover.
WWE 2K24 Original release date(s): WW: March 8, 2024	Release years by system: 2024— PlayStation 4, PlayStation 5, Xbox One, Xbox Series X/S, Microsoft Windows
WWE 2K24 Original release date(s): WW: March 8, 2024	Notes: Cover art features Cody Rhodes.; Deluxe Edition features Bianca Belair and Rhea Ripley.; Cover art for the collector's 40 Years of Wrestlemania edition features Andre the Giant, Stone Cold Steve Austin, Hulk Hogan, Brock Lesnar, The Undertaker, The Rock, John Cena, Bret Hart, Triple H, Shawn Michaels, Becky Lynch, Roman Reigns, Bianca Belair, and Charlotte Flair.; Cover art for the Bray Wyatt Edition features Bray Wyatt.
WWE 2K25 Original release date(s): WW: March 14, 2025	Release years by system: 2025— PlayStation 4, PlayStation 5, Xbox One, Xbox Series X/S, Microsoft Windows, Nintendo Switch 2, iOS, Android
WWE 2K25 Original release date(s): WW: March 14, 2025	Notes: Cover art features Roman Reigns and Paul Heyman.; The iOS and Android versions were released by Netflix.; This was also the final installment for the WWE video games to be released on the PlayStation 4 and Xbox One platforms.
WWE 2K26 Original release date(s): WW: March 13, 2026	Release years by system: 2026— PlayStation 5, Xbox Series X/S, Microsoft Windows, Nintendo Switch 2
WWE 2K26 Original release date(s): WW: March 13, 2026	Notes: Cover art features CM Punk.; Deluxe Edition features Triple H.; Cover art for the Attitude Era Edition features The Undertaker, Kane, Stone Cold Steve Austin, Shawn Michaels, Triple H, The Rock, Chyna, Kurt Angle, Lita, Trish Stratus, Stephanie McMahon, and the Dudley Boyz.; Cover art for The Monday Night War Edition features Stone Cold Steve Austin, The Rock, The Undertaker, Triple H, and Chyna for the WWE side, and Eric Bischoff, Booker T, Goldberg, Scott Hall, Kevin Nash, and Hollywood Hulk Hogan for the WCW side.

== Spin-offs ==
Game	Details
WWE 2K Original release date(s): WW: July 16, 2015	Release years by system: 2015—Android, iOS
WWE 2K Original release date(s): WW: July 16, 2015	Notes: Mobile-based spin-off of WWE 2K15.; Developed by n-Space and Visual Concepts.
WWE 2K Battlegrounds Original release date(s): WW: September 18, 2020	Release years by system: 2020—PlayStation 4, Xbox One, Microsoft Windows, Nintendo Switch, Stadia
WWE 2K Battlegrounds Original release date(s): WW: September 18, 2020	Notes: Arcade style game replacing WWE 2K21 due to the negative reviews and low sales WWE 2K20 received.; Developed by Saber Interactive.; This is the first (and only) game in the series to be released on Stadia.; This is the first game in the series to support cross-platform play, though only between Xbox One, Microsoft Windows, and Stadia.

== See also ==
- List of WWE personnel
- List of WWE video games
- WWE
- WWE 2K
