= Akari Uchida =

Japanese video game producer

- 内田 明理
- Occupations: Video game producer, Video game designer
- Years active: 2002-present

Akari Uchida (内田 明理, Uchida Akari; born 1969) is a video game producer. He was the former head of Love Plus Production, a video game develop team under Konami, best known as the producer of LovePlus series, a dating sim video game series that player can date with 3 different high school girls. He joined Konami in 1993 and left in March 2015 and will join another Japan video game company, Yuke's officially in October 2015; additionally he will lead a new game development team—Uchida Lab, named by his name. He has received the nickname "father-in-law"(お義父さん) by LovePlus fans.

== Works ==
=== Konami era ===
- Ganbare Goemon: Uchū Kaizoku Akogingu (1996) - Programmer
- Nagano Winter Olympics '98 (1998) - Game Designer
- Dance Dance Revolution (1999) - Programmer

Tokimeki Memorial Girl's Side series

- Tokimeki Memorial Girl's Side (2002) - Game Designer, Scriptwriter, Director
- Tokimeki Memorial Girl's Side: 2nd Kiss (2006) - Game Designer, Scenario Supervisor, Producer
- Tokimeki Memorial Girl's Side: 1st Love (2007)
- Tokimeki Memorial Girl's Side: 2nd Season (2008) - Producer
- Tokimeki Memorial Girl's Side: 1st Love Plus (2009) - Producer
- Tokimeki Memorial Girl's Side: 3rd Story (2010) - Planning, Scenario, Producer
- Tokimeki Memorial Girl's Side Premium 〜3rd Story〜 (2012)

Rumble Roses series

- Rumble Roses (2004) - Producer
- Rumble Roses XX (2006) - Producer

Magician's Quest series

- Tongari Boushi to Mahou no 365 Nichi (Nintendo DS, 2008)
- Tongari Boushi to Mahou no Omise (Nintendo DS, 2010)
- Tongari Boushi to Oshare na Mahou Tsukai (Nintendo DS, 2011)
- Tongari Boushi to Mahou no Machi (Nintendo 3DS, 2012)

LovePlus series

- LovePlus (2009) - Producer, Scenario
- LovePlus + (2010) - Producer, Scenario
- NEW LovePlus (2012) - Senior Producer, Scenario
- LovePlus Collection (2013)
- NEW LovePlus + (2012) - Senior Producer, Scenario
