= Kei Morioka =

Japanese guitarist, composer and arranger

Kei Morioka 森岡 慶
- Also known as: KEI
- Born: May 9, 1968 (age 58)
- Origin: Japan
- Occupations: Guitarist; composer; arranger
- Instrument: Guitar
- Years active: 1987–present

Kei Morioka (Japanese: 森岡 慶, Morioka Kei) is a Japanese guitarist, composer and arranger. His older brother was musician Ken Morioka, who was active in groups including Soft Ballet.

With rock-based guitar performance at the core of his work, Morioka has worked across a range of fields including video game music, anime-related works, idol music and stage music, contributing as a composer, arranger, guitarist and sound creator.

== Biography ==
Morioka began studying piano and solfège at the age of four and started playing guitar at the age of nine. At fifteen, he moved to the United States on his own.

In 1985, he studied at the Dick Grove School of Music in the United States, where he studied jazz-based music theory, improvisation and ensemble performance.

He subsequently attended the Guitar Institute of Technology (GIT) at the Musicians Institute (MI), where he studied practical contemporary guitar performance, including rock music.

At the Musicians Institute graduation ceremony held on March 21, 1987, Morioka was selected as a student performer for the final number of the program, "Bad Girls", appearing under the name Kei Morioka alongside Craig Smack, Mark Jarvis and drummer Matt Laug.

He also appeared in the institute's 1988 yearbook under the spelling Kei Marioka.

While at Musicians Institute, Morioka was also involved in teaching younger musicians alongside his own performing activities. In 2025, the guitar-oriented YouTube channel Guitar Breakdown introduced Morioka as a guitarist who had taught at the Guitar Institute of Technology and discussed studying transcriptions of Morioka's playing, including his picking and phrasing.

American guitarist Paul Hanson referred to Kei Marioka in Example 53 of his 1996 instructional book Shred Guitar: A Complete System for the Rock Improviser, presenting three "diagonal" phrases which he attributed to Morioka's playing.

After returning to Japan, Morioka worked as an instructor in the guitar course at Professional Music School AMVOX, teaching younger musicians. He was listed as a guitar-course instructor in the school's 1998 brochure.

Morioka later expanded his activities beyond guitar performance into video game music, anime-related works, idol music and stage music, also working in composition, arrangement, sound production and mixing.

== Musical activities ==
In video game music, Morioka participated as a music composer on the 2000 PlayStation game WWF SmackDown!, released in Japan as Exciting Pro Wrestling.

The game's match music made extensive use of heavy-metal elements, and a contemporary review noted a change in musical style compared with earlier professional wrestling games.

Morioka also participated in the sequel, WWF SmackDown! 2: Know Your Role, released in Japan as Exciting Pro Wrestling 2, as a composer and musician. The game sold 3.2 million copies and was recognized by Guinness World Records as the best-selling combat sports video game on a single format.

Morioka has also had a long association with the video game audio production company Sound AMS. In 2018, the company described him as a guitarist who had performed on numerous video games including titles in the WWE series, and stated that he had worked with sound producer Momo Michishita for more than twenty years.

Morioka formed the musical unit sWan with vocalist haru and was active in the unit as a guitarist. A profile published by the Tokyo live venue Haretara Sora ni Mame Maite described Morioka as a guitarist who had been active in the United States and characterized sWan's sound as combining pop, rock and bossa nova.

The unit released its first album, Tobitateru Shirushi, on July 2, 2014.

Morioka has also provided compositions and arrangements for artists including Melon Batake a go go, The Grateful a MogAAAz, GARUDA and THE MONSTER A GOGO'S. Uta-Net lists 71 songs arranged by Morioka.

He has also worked on music for stage productions. In 2023, he composed the theme song for ViStar PRODUCE vol.4, Hikimusubi: Tsumugi Musubu wa Yakusoku no Ito.

== Video game works ==
MobyGames groups credits under both Kei Morioka and the Japanese form 森岡 慶 as belonging to the same person and lists Morioka on multiple video game titles.

- WWF SmackDown! (2000, PlayStation) – Music Composers
- WWF Royal Rumble (2000, Dreamcast) – Sound Engineers
- WWF SmackDown! 2: Know Your Role (2000, PlayStation) – Composers & Musicians
- WWF SmackDown! Just Bring It (2001, PlayStation 2) – Sound
- World Fighting (2003, PlayStation 2) – Guitar, credited as 森岡 慶
- WWE SmackDown! vs. Raw (2004, PlayStation 2) – Sound Creators, credited as Kai Morioka
- Rumble Roses (2004, PlayStation 2) – Sound Engineers
- Love Songs ADV Futaba Riho 19-sai: Fuyu (2004, PlayStation 2) – Guitar
- D1 Professional Drift Grand Prix Series (2005, PlayStation 2) – credited under Sound AMS, Inc.
- Rumble Roses XX (2006, Xbox 360) – SFX Design & Build Music
- The Dog Island (2007, Wii / PlayStation 2) – Guitar
- Double D Dodgeball (2008, Xbox 360) – Sound Creators
- Mobile Suit Gundam 00: Gundam Meisters (2008, PlayStation 2) – Sound
- DC Super Hero Girls: Teen Power (2021, Nintendo Switch) – Music
- Full Metal Schoolgirl (2025, Nintendo Switch 2 / PlayStation 5 / PC) – arrangement of "Zenshin Machine Girls"

== Pachislot works ==
- Pachislot Ganbare Goemon 2: Kiteretsu Kaidō Katsugeki (2011) – arrangement of "Ganbare Let's Go!!!"

== Composition and arrangement ==
=== Melon Batake a go go ===
Morioka has served as a sound producer for Melon Batake a go go and has contributed to the group's music as a composer and arranger.

His principal composition and arrangement credits include:

- "Silver Jet to Bokutachi no Monogatari" – composition and arrangement
- "BURNING SOUL" – composition and arrangement
- "Kaizoku QUEEN AMAZONES" – composition and arrangement
- "RUN IDOLS RUN" – composition
- "GO GO MELON THE VICTORY" – composition and arrangement
- "Muteki no IDOL" – composition
- "to IDOLS to US to YOU" – co-composition and co-arrangement with Moritaka Kinoshita

Morioka has also arranged songs including "Adrian: DEAD IDOLS DON'T DEAD", "Ikasu ze IDOL", "Texas Blue", "NO LOOKING BACK", "Aa! IDOL Massainaka!", "Dance Hall", "LIAR", "Maniac", "Sunglass Man", "Zombie Blues", "Saturday Night Fever", "Still Monster Go Go Mansion", "NIGHTMARE BEFORE VAMPIRE" and "Spinuts".

He and Moritaka Kinoshita jointly arranged "ROCKIN' IDOL STOMP" and "Ai $ Senshi".

Morioka also arranged several tracks on the album WHITE MELON, including "Sunglass Man".

=== The Grateful a MogAAAz ===
Morioka has worked as a composer and arranger on releases by The Grateful a MogAAAz.

- "Koroshiya no Lullaby" – composition and arrangement
- "WHAT AM I?" – composition and arrangement
- "I'M A PERSON" – arrangement
- "Jigoku no Sata mo SORE Shidai" – arrangement
- "GYPSY EYES" – arrangement
- "Kimagure ni Maware" – arrangement
- "ALL THROUGH THE NIGHT" – arrangement
- "DEEP DOWN" – arrangement
- "LET'S GO GARAGE" – arrangement
- "RING OF PUNKROCK" – arrangement

=== GARUDA ===
Morioka has worked as a composer and arranger on releases by GARUDA.

- "RUMMBLING RHINO" – composition and arrangement
- "BLOOD OR TEARS" – arrangement

=== THE MONSTER A GOGO'S ===
Morioka has arranged recordings by THE MONSTER A GOGO'S.

- "JOKER" – arrangement
- "MIRRORMAN" – arrangement
- "NASTY BOMB" – arrangement
- "MUTANT ROCK" – arrangement
- "ZOMBEAT" – arrangement
- "FOLSOM PRISON BLUES" – arrangement

=== Dream Club ===
Morioka has arranged songs from the Dream Club series.

- "Itoshiki Hero!" – arrangement
- "Yokohama Rhapsody" Ver.0 – arrangement
- "Koi o Shiteimasu" Ver.0 – arrangement
- "☆Paradise☆" – co-arrangement with Hiroki Matsunaga
- "Yume no Seijaku" – arrangement
- "Watashi no Kokoro no Naka no Taiyō" – arrangement

=== Other works ===
- Kurea Hasumi – "GIVE ME MORE" – composition and arrangement
- ViStar PRODUCE vol.4, Hikimusubi: Tsumugi Musubu wa Yakusoku no Ito (2023) – theme-song composition; lyrics by Tomoyuki Yuguchi and vocals by Mifuki Oshima.

== Recording participation ==
- GO! GO! ELEKI! TEKE-TEKE-TECHNO! (1996) – guitar on "Pipeline", "Walk, Don't Run '64" and "Secret Agent Man".
- Soft Ballet – MENOPAUSE (2003) – guitar as a supporting musician.
- World Fighting (2003, PlayStation 2) – guitar. The game's credits list Morioka under the Japanese name 森岡 慶.
- Ken Morioka – Jade (2005) – guitar as a supporting musician.
- The Dog Island (2007, PlayStation 2 / Wii) – guitar. Morioka is credited as Kei Morioka in both versions.
- PURE SONGS @ DREAM C CLUB (2009) – guitar.
- PURE SONGS 2 @ DREAM C CLUB (2010) – guitar with Motoo Yasufuku; Morioka also arranged "Itoshiki Hero!".
- PURE SONGS ZERO @ DREAM C CLUB (2011) – guitar; Morioka also arranged several tracks.
- PURE SONGS 3 @ DREAM C CLUB Gogo. (2014) – guitar with Motoo Yasufuku and Katsuya Kumamoto; Morioka also arranged "Yume no Seijaku" and "Watashi no Kokoro no Naka no Taiyō".

== Live performances ==
Morioka has participated as a guitarist in the solo activities of his older brother Ken Morioka.

In a 2012 live-event listing published by the Japanese music magazine Rooftop, Morioka was billed as KEI in the lineup "KEN.MORIOKA + KEI + YUKARIE".

== Family ==
Morioka's older brother was musician Ken Morioka, who was active in groups including Soft Ballet.

When Ken Morioka died on June 3, 2016, an announcement published on the official website of minus(-) identified Kei Morioka as Ken Morioka's younger brother and as the family's representative.

In June 2026, marking the tenth anniversary of Ken Morioka's death, Morioka issued a memorial message for his brother. Nikkan Sports described him as Ken Morioka's younger brother and a guitarist.

== Name variations ==
Kei Morioka

This is the romanized form most commonly used in Morioka's video game credits and other professional materials. MobyGames groups credits under Kei Morioka and the Japanese form 森岡 慶 as belonging to the same person.

Kei Marioka

Morioka's name appears as Kei Marioka in the 1988 Musicians Institute yearbook. The same spelling is also used in Paul Hanson's 1996 instructional book Shred Guitar: A Complete System for the Rock Improviser.

Kai Morioka

In the credits for WWE SmackDown! vs. Raw, Morioka is credited as Kai Morioka. MobyGames groups this credit with the same Kei Morioka profile.

KEI

Morioka has also been billed simply as KEI in live performances. A 2012 listing published by Rooftop billed a performance as "KEN.MORIOKA + KEI + YUKARIE".
