= WWF Royal Rumble (2000 video game) =

Professional wrestling game

- Arcade flyer art featuring Stone Cold Steve Austin and The Rock.
- Developers: Sega Software R&D Dept. 1 Yuke's (Dreamcast)
- Publishers: Sega (Arcade); THQ (North America/Europe); Yuke's (Japan)
- Platforms: Arcade, Dreamcast
- Release: Dreamcast: NA: 14 August 2000; EU: 22 September 2000; JP: 26 April 2001; Arcade: NA: November 2000
- Genres: Fighting, sports
- Modes: Single player, multiplayer
- Arcade system: Sega NAOMI

WWF Royal Rumble is a professional wrestling video game released in 2000 for arcades and the Dreamcast. THQ published the title for the Dreamcast while Sega released it for arcades. It is based on the World Wrestling Federation (WWF) professional wrestling promotion and its yearly Royal Rumble event. This game took its influence from the event's 2000 edition. Yuke's, creators of the WWF SmackDown! series, developed Royal Rumble, which had several unique features including support for up to nine wrestlers on the screen simultaneously. The Dreamcast version was subsequently released in Japan by Yuke's on April 26 2001, at a retail price of ¥3,800.

The Dreamcast version received mixed reviews, with critics praising its fast-paced arcade action and multiplayer features, while others criticized its limited roster, lack of gameplay modes and overall depth.

== Gameplay ==
Royal Rumble mode allows for more than eight characters on screen at once, including multiple instances of one wrestler; in this picture there are three Steve Austins.

The game has two modes, Exhibition and Royal Rumble. In Exhibition mode, the player chooses a wrestler along with a partner and wrestles a series of singles matches. The player's partner can interfere on the player's behalf on command. These partner moves can be used any number of times during the match, but must be recharged before they can be used again. The object of each match is to wear down the opponent using various attacks and grappling maneuvers, decreasing their life bar before ending the match by pinfall or knockout.

The available partner attacks vary depending on the wrestler selected, with the Japanese publication Dreamcast Magazine reporting approximately 90 different variations. Successful attacks also build a special gauge, which allows wrestlers to execute their finishing moves. The game additionally features backstage fighting sequences in which wrestlers can interact with their surroundings.

Royal Rumble mode involves a multi-wrestler match in which the player must eliminate a certain number of opponents from the match within a time limit by sending them over the top rope and onto the floor. Eliminating opponents adds more time to the player's clock; eliminating larger wrestlers offers a higher time bonus. Due to size of the game's roster, wrestlers appear multiple times in the same Royal Rumble match.

Each player has a super meter that fills up during the course of the match. When it fills up, the player receives an "S" icon, which can be used to instantly recover from pin attempts in Exhibition mode or re-enter the ring during a Royal Rumble match.

== Reception ==
Reception

Aggregate score
Aggregator	Score
Metacritic	66/100

Review scores
Publication	Score
AllGame	2/5
CNET Gamecenter	7/10
Electronic Gaming Monthly	5/10 (Note: Two critics of Electronic Gaming Monthly gave the Dreamcast version each a score of 5.5/10, and the other gave it 4/10.)
Famitsu	30/40
GameFan	(E.M.) 87% 78% (Note: In GameFan's viewpoint of the Dreamcast version, three critics gave it each a score of 77, 82, and 76.)
GamePro	3.5/5
GameSpot	6.5/10
GameSpy	4/10
IGN	5.2/10
Next Generation	3/5
Maxim	8/10

The Dreamcast version received "average" reviews according to video game review aggregator Metacritic.

One of the biggest criticisms was of the small number of playable characters, which IGN called "paper thin" and GameSpot's Jeff Gerstmann called confining. The game's lack of modes was also criticized. IGN recommended other Japanese Dreamcast wrestling titles such as Toukon Retsuden and Giant Gram over Royal Rumble. The earliest review came from PlanetDreamcast, which gave it a low score of four out of ten over a month before the game was released. Daniel Erickson of NextGen said that the game is neither deep nor revolutionary but overall fun. In Japan, Famitsu gave it a score of 30 out of 40.

European publications offered contrasting assessments of the Dreamcast version. The British magazine Computer and Video Games awarded WWF Royal Rumble five out of five stars, praising its arcade-style action, partner system and wrestling moves. The Spanish publication Revista Oficial Dreamcast gave the game 7 out of 10, commending its character models, accessible controls and multiplayer options, particularly the Royal Rumble mode featuring up to nine wrestlers simultaneously. In contrast, the German magazine MAN!AC awarded it 54%, criticizing its limited roster, lack of gameplay depth and insufficient variety.

According to NPD sales figures reproduced by Blast Processing!, WWF Royal Rumble had sold 228,908 copies in North America by March 2003.
