= Soukaigi =

1998 video game

Soukaigi 双界儀
- Developer: Yuke's
- Publisher: Square
- Director: Nobuhiko Amakawa
- Producer: Yusuke Hirata
- Artist: Natsuki Sumeragi
- Writer: Nobuhiko Amakawa
- Composer: Hiroki Kikuta
- Platform: PlayStation
- Release: JP: 28 May 1998
- Genre: Action role-playing
- Mode: Single-player

Soukaigi 双界儀 (Note: (双界儀; Hiragana: そうかいぎ, Katakana: ソウカイギ, lit. Twin Dimensions)) is a 1998 action role-playing game developed by Yuke's and published by Square for the PlayStation. It was later re-released digitally for the PlayStation Portable, PlayStation 3 and PlayStation Vita. No version of the game was localized. Set in modern-day Japan, Soukaigi follows a group of five people chosen by the gods to save Japan from a supernatural catastrophe. Gameplay has each character navigating levels, fighting monsters and completing required tasks to advance the story.

The game was developed as part of Square's initiative of forming small teams of young developers to create experimental titles for the PlayStation. Director and writer Nobuhiko Amakawa wanted to create a modern Japanese fantasy. Yuke's was allowed total creative freedom by Square, who financed the project with a generous budget which allowed for live music composed by Hiroki Kikuta and full voice acting. Character designs were created by Natsuki Sumeragi. The game met with low sales and mixed reviews in both Japan and the West.

== Premise and gameplay ==
Gameplay screenshot

Soukaigi is an action role-playing game set in a fantastical version of Japan in 1998. The game is divided between gameplay segments and cutscenes used to communicate the narrative. In December 1998, explosions across Japan centered around Mount Fuji kill a significant portion of Japan's population. The explosion sites house magical pillars known as the "Gallan", and ghostly demigods known as "Yorigami" have claimed the now-ruined country. The gods choose five people, each attuned to the elements tied to the Gallan, to save Japan from their influence.

Players take on the role of five different characters as they fight against powerful monsters controlling regions of the land; the main objective in each level is to destroy crystals of concentrated Suiki (negative energy) and gather Ouki (positive energy), the latter acting as experience points to raise a character's statistics (stats). Players control each character in third-person, starting with a pre-determined character and later expanding the available roster. The camera locked behind the player, but can be rotated with the character to explore the environment. Each character has a different innate ability in addition to basic attacks, a jump, a mid-air dash and items which can briefly increase attack power or perform special magical attacks. Enemies in levels are monsters, which manifesting around crystallised Suiki and attack the player after appearing.

Stages range from countryside locations to towns, which allows for platforming areas where players jump between rooftops. Some stages feature areas of water, which kill a character on contact. Areas end with a boss encounter. Before boss encounters and outside levels, players can use gathered Ouki to raise any character's stats; these include health, strength, attack power, and special abilities and upgrades to abilities such as jumping. These are gathered from destroyed crystals in each area. There are three crystal types to find; red, blue and yellow, which are progressively more difficult to destroy. Dying at any point ends the game, forcing players to restart the level.

== Development ==
During the late 1990s, Square launched an initiative to foster talent within the company; small teams of younger developers would work with a smaller budget to create experimental titles for the PlayStation; one of these titles was Soukaigi. Soukaigi was developed by Yuke's, a company best known for their sports titles. Among the production cooperators was Solid, a subsidiary of Square dedicated to working with third-party developers. According to different sources, Yuke's was approached by Square, who were impressed at the technical prowess demonstrated by their wrestling game Power Move Pro Wrestling; or Yuke's approached Square with an ambitious gaming project which required funding and a publisher. The game was produced by Square's Yusuke Hirata, and directed and written by Nobuhiko Amakawa of Yuke's.

Amakawa created the story concept of a fantasy set in modern-day Japan. While games based on Japanese folklore had seen little success at the time, Square allowed Yuke's total creative freedom and Amakawa decided to go ahead with the concept. The characters were designed by artist Natsuki Sumeragi. Enemy designs were handled by Takeshi Tanaka. The various level areas were based on the Japanese regions in which they were set, although they were made more fantastic due to the game's premise. Soukaigi included full voice acting, with several prominent Japanese actors portraying the main cast; Square told Yuke's that they need not be concerned with the casting budget, which was large enough to surprise Yuke's staff. The game featured two and a half hours of real-time cutscenes integrated into gameplay.

=== Music ===
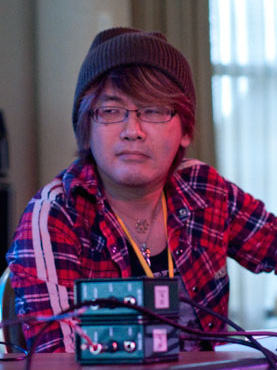
Soundtrack composer, arranger and producer Hiroki Kikuta pictured in 2011.

The music of Soukaigi was composed by Hiroki Kikuta, who had previously scored Secret of Mana and Trials of Mana. Kikuta acted as composer, arranger and producer for the soundtrack. The musical production was handled entirely by Square. The expanded storage capacity of the PlayStation allowed Kikuta to include live orchestral music. Due to the game not being developed by Square, its influences were very different, encouraging Kikuta to experiment with the score. Similar to his work on the Super Famicom Mana games, Kikuta wanted to push the hardware capacities of the PlayStation's sound card when creating his score.

The music budget was ¥30 million. Kikuta composed the music with "different complex styles"; his cited examples were the fusion of in-house music with live orchestra, and combining fusion and folk music. His main inspiration when composing were East European bands such as Värttinä. The track "Quake" used Buddhist chant-inspired lyrics written in Malayan and Thai. The singers performed the lyrics phonetically to create an exotic impression. Recording the music took around a month. Kikuta was able to reserve multiple studios for recording because of the high budget, with his aim being to transform the live performances through computers when transferring them into the game. Conversely, this high studio usage and its toll on the overall budget severely restricted the number of tracks he could create.

Due to his unconventional scoring style, which involved difficult chord transitions, there were some conflicts with the performers. Once he explained his idea, they understood and were able to perform their parts. Kikuta has said that he had different challenges for each of his compositions between Secret of Mana and Soukaigi; with Soukaigi, it was the challenge of recording live with Japanese stage musicians. A remembered incident during recording that impressed Kikuta was guitar soloist Tomohito Aoki performing his part in the track "Fire Wire" with a severe hangover. Around 80% of the soundtrack was recorded live. The ending theme "Lovely Strains" was performed by Kotomi Kyono, with lyrics by Yuki Kitayama.

An official soundtrack album was released on June 11, 1998. It was published by DigiCube and distributed by the music division of Sony under the catalog number SSCX-10017. The album was around 50 minutes long, and included seventeen tracks. Tracks from the game were later released on the Square Vocal Collection (2001), Square Enix Battle Tracks Vol.2 Square 1996～1998 (2010), and Final Fantasy Tribute ~Thanks~ (2012) arrange albums. Dave Valentine of Video Game Music Online gave the album a rating of four out of five stars; Valentine was almost entirely positive about each track and the extensive use of live orchestra. Chris Greening of RPGFan was similarly positive, ranking the album as a must-buy alongside the soundtracks of Xenogears and Parasite Eve due to its strong live elements and different tone from other Square games.

=== Release ===
Soukaigi was first announced at the 1997 Tokyo Game Show. At the time, it was described as Square's first third-person action title. At its announcement, the game was roughly 50% complete. The game's Japanese title translates into English as "Twin Dimensions". Soukaigi was released on 28 May 1998. It has never seen an official Western release. The game was later reissued on the PlayStation Network on August 13, 2008 as one of a series of vintage titles from the PlayStation era. It was later released for PlayStation 3 and PlayStation Vita. During its year of release, Soukaigi sold over 132,000 units and ranks as one of the 100 best-selling games for that year.

Soukaigi received a manga adaptation, written by Ayuki Kirishima and released by Kadokawa Shoten in three tankōbon between May 1998 and January 1999 as part of the publisher's Asuka Comics line. A novelization of the same name was published by Kadokawa Shoten through their Asuka Novel line on 2 June 1998. The novel was written by Hatano Taka, with a cover illustration by Sumeragi. Hatano Taka collaborated closely with Amakawa to ensure the novelization did not stray too far from the original game's plot and themes. New story segments, such as an epilogue, were added to explain the more confusing aspects, but these ended up creating unwanted contradictions that had to be smoothed out between Hatano and Amakawa.

== Reception ==
Reception

Review scores
Publication	Score
Consoles +	92%
Famitsu	34/40
GameSpot	5.6/10
Joypad	5/10
Dengeki PlayStation	70/100, 70/100, 75/100, 80/100
Gamers' Republic	C
Station	62%

Japanese magazine Famitsu was generally positive about the story, characters and music. One reviewer felt that the graphics looked "rough" for the PlayStation title. Western magazine Gamers' Republic was fairly negative about the game, with the reviewer finding that it was only the boss battles and music that kept him playing. GameSpot reviewer James Mielke said the game "fails to live up to its expectations", praising the music and stable frame rate, but finding most other aspects either low-quality or poorly designed. He summarized that the game could not stand up against other similar 3D titles such as Panzer Dragoon Saga.

In a separate feature titled "Games You'll Never Play", GameSpot called Soukaigi "a great idea but a cruddy game", citing a lack of polish and a greater scale than the PlayStation could handle. IGN, in a preview of a nearly-finished version of the game, were scathing about the gameplay, though gave praise to the environment and enemy designs. Japanese websites Inside Games and Dengeki Online both posted retrospectives for the game's 20th anniversary; they each praised the narrative, soundtrack and technical performance, but faulted the gameplay segments and overall graphical quality.
