= The Dog (franchise) =

Japanese franchise

Artlist Collection: The Dog
- The Dog logo since September 2020
- Created by: Artlist

Official website
- www.thedogandfriends.com/en/

Artlist Collection: The Dog (formerly known as Artlist Collection: The Dog and Friends, better known as The Dog) is a media franchise created by Artlist in Japan in 2000. The franchise began as a collection of calendars and postcards of dogs photographed with a fisheye lens. Afterwards, the franchise became so popular that new animals such as cats, pigs, rabbits, ducks, hamsters, and birds were added to the collection.

In 2003, 4Kids Entertainment bought the rights for the franchise outside of Asia. In 2004, to celebrate 25 years of the McDonald's Happy Meal, toys of this franchise were sold as Happy Meals from April 2 to April 29. Select locations featured dog adoption events. They were sold once again the next year, but with "The Cat" plushes.

In 2003, the series introduced its first video game, The Dog Master, which was released exclusively in Japan for the PlayStation and developed by Visit. In 2006, The Dog: Happy Life was released, also exclusively in Japan, which was followed up by a 2007 adventure game, The Dog Island, both developed by Yuke's. In 2009, the series also released a pet simulation game on mobile phones and smart phones. In 2016, they were featured as themes for the Japanese Nintendo 3DS home menu.

From 2003 to 2008, McDonald's sold "The Dog" Happy Meal toys in China, where they were called "BFF Big Head Dog". They were brought back in July 2025, with it becoming popular online due to its nostalgia in the region.
