= Natsuki Sumeragi =

Japanese manga artist

Natsuki Sumeragi (皇名月 or 皇なつき, Sumeragi Natsuki; born 1967-08-21 at Osaka) is a Japanese manga artist. She graduated from Ritsumeikan University with a degree in Japanese literature. She is famous for portraying Chinese and Korean history in her works. She currently lives in Kyoto.

== Works ==
=== Manga ===
- Hananokoe (花情曲)
- Butterfly Lovers (梁山伯と祝英台, Ryosanpaku to Shukueidai)
- Richo angyoki (李朝・暗行記)
- Toukagen kitan (桃花源奇譚)
- An Actor's Journal (燕京伶人抄, Peking reijin shou)
- Koto no kishi no moto (黄土の旗幟のもと)
- An Actor's Journal 2 (燕京伶人抄 弐 女兒情, Peking reijin shou 2)
- Rensen - Hananokoe yowa (恋泉 花情曲余話)
- The Emperor and the Assassin (始皇帝暗殺, Shikoutei ansatsu)
- Yama no sumu kami (山に住む神)
- Delta in the Darkness (黒猫の三角, Kuroneko no sankaku), story by Hiroshi Mori
- Archaic Chain (アルカイック・チェイン)
- Yume Genji Tsurugi no Saimon (夢源氏剣祭文), story by Koike Kazuo
- Mitsubachi to Enrai (蜜蜂と遠雷)

=== Games ===
- Soukaigi (双界儀), character design
- Granado Espada (グラナド・エスパダ), character concept design

=== Illustration Collection ===
- Gashu (画趣)
