= LovePlus =

2009 video game

- Developer: Konami
- Publisher: Konami
- Producer: Akari Uchida
- Platforms: Nintendo DS; LovePlus; LovePlus+; Nintendo 3DS; NEW LovePlus; NEW LovePlus+
- Release: JP: September 3, 2009; JP: June 24, 2010 (LovePlus+); JP: February 14, 2012 (NEW LovePlus); JP: March 27, 2014 (NEW LovePlus+); JP: October 31, 2019 (LovePlus Every)
- Genre: Dating sim
- Mode: Single-player

LovePlus (Japanese: ラブプラス, Hepburn: Rabu Purasu) is a dating sim developed and published by Konami for the Nintendo DS handheld video game console. It was released in Japan in 2009. Several updates and sequels have followed, including one for iOS in 2011. It has not been released outside Japan.

== Characters ==
Protagonist /Player (主人公 / プレイヤー, Shujinkou / Pureiyā)
A second year high school student just transferred to Towano High School. Soon after, he joins the library committee and the tennis club, and gets a part-time job at a family restaurant. He is the only character the player can name in the game, and they can choose to refer in first person as ore (俺) or boku (僕) ("Boku" and "Ore" are both masculine pronouns for "I", with "Ore" being the less polite of the two). In the LovePlus Rinko Days manga, his name is Wataru Aikawa.

Manaka Takane (高嶺 愛花, Takane Manaka)
Voiced by: Saori Hayami
A second-year high school student who goes to the same after-school tennis club as the protagonist. She comes from a well-off family and has lived a sheltered life, having no experience in many "normal" things like eating a hamburger combo, going out with her friends after the club, or watching TV. Her classmates shy away from her perfectionism, which is why she has few friends. Her name echoes a Japanese term for an unattainable girl/woman: 高嶺の花 (takane no hana).

Rinko Kobayakawa (小早川 凛子, Kobayakawa Rinko)
Voiced by: Sakura Tange
A first-year high school student who the protagonist meets after being forced to join the library committee. She constantly wears earphones and has an attitude that keeps people away from her. Rinko's attitude stems from her feeling alienated and unwanted in her home after her father remarried, bringing a new mother and younger brother into the house. "Whenever I am home, the atmosphere darkens", as Rinko described. She wanders the streets after school, avoiding going back to an unwelcoming home. She likes punk rock and fighting games. The character concept was taken from Haruki Murakami's Dance, Dance, Dance character Yuki.

Nene Anegasaki (姉ヶ崎 寧々, Anegasaki Nene)
Voiced by: Yūko Minaguchi
A third-year high school student working part-time in a family restaurant, where the protagonist meets her. She is the dependable big sister from whom everyone asks help. She has a mole under her right eye and likes housework and horror movies. In an early development setting she was meant to be a college student with light makeup. The latter remained part of her appearance during game release. In November 2009, a Japanese man and player of LovePlus "married" this character, provoking widespread media attention.

== LovePlus+ ==
LovePlus+ is the same as the original LovePlus, although with new content, including field trips, fitness modes, sick days, Taisen Puzzle-Dama, capsule toys and more. Almost everything from the original game also makes an appearance in LovePlus+, along with many new ways to interact with the girls. Data can also be transferred from the original game to LovePlus+. Anti-piracy measures have also been upgraded. The game was released in Japan on June 24, 2010.

== LovePlus i ==
LovePlus i is an iOS app that was released on December 12, 2011. Manaka, Rinko, and Nene are sold separately for 600 yen each.

== Manga ==
In 2010, Kodansha launched LovePlus spin-off manga serials starting in April through early May in five different Kodansha magazines: Manaka, Rinko and Nene each have their own storyline.

1. LovePlus Manaka Days by Mikami Akitsu in Monthly Shōnen Rival
2. LovePlus Rinko Days by Kōji Seo in Bessatsu Shōnen Magazine
3. LovePlus Nene Days by Takaki Kugatsu in Monthly Young Magazine
4. LovePlus Girls Talk by Daisuke Sakura in Magazine E-no
5. LovePlus Her Past (ラブプラス カノジョの過去, Rabupurasu Kanojo no Kako) by Hiroaki Wakamiya in good! Afternoon

== Sequels ==
A sequel was released for the Nintendo 3DS on February 14, 2012, titled New LovePlus. An updated version of New LovePlus called New LovePlus+ was released on March 27, 2014.

LovePlus Collection is based on the original game, but is made for mobile phones and uses a card battle system to develop the player's relationship with the girls. It also features a new character, Akira Yukino, a sophomore. It was released as a standalone app at iTunes and Google Play (although the player needs a GREE account to play) on April 18, 2013. A free-to-play mobile game, LovePlus Every, was launched in October 2019 and ended service on 5 August 2020.
