= The Dog Island =

2007 video game

THE DOG Island
- Developer: Yuke's
- Publishers: JP: Yuke's; WW: Ubisoft
- Platforms: Wii, PlayStation 2
- Release: April 26, 2007: Wii; JP: April 26, 2007; AU: March 13, 2008; EU: April 11, 2008; NA: May 6, 2008; PS2; JP: April 26, 2007; AU: April 2008; EU: April 11, 2008; NA: October 14, 2008
- Genre: Adventure
- Mode: Single-player

THE DOG Island (Note: Japanese: The Dog Island ひとつの花の物語, Hepburn: The Dog Island: Hitotsu no Hana no Monogatari; lit. "The Dog Island: The Story of the One Flower") is a 2007 adventure video game for the Wii and PlayStation 2 consoles in which players control a dog and must go on a journey to search for a special flower to aid their sick sibling, which can only be found by achieving their goal to become a "sniff master". The player interacts with various other animals in the game that give hints and information to aid on the quest. The video game is the third video game based on The Dog franchise after The Dog Master and The Dog: Happy Life, and the first released outside of Japan.

== Gameplay ==
THE DOG Island is an adventure game wherein the player controls a dog in exploring and navigating through different environments while completing tasks. The player can walk, run, crawl, and bark, the last of which is used as defense against the hostile enemies populating the area. In the game, several types of enemies are found, including snakes, gorillas, bears, and bats, all of which, except for bats, are able to be stunned by barking behind them; holding the button used to bark eventually produces a howl, which stuns the enemy indefinitely until the player exits the area. Failure to contain an enemy will cause them to attack the player, depleting their HP or causing a poisonous status, which depletes HP over time, or shock, which slows movement. The player starts out with 3 HP, which gets upgraded up to 10 at certain points in the game; losing them all forces the player to start over from the last save point.

The player can sniff and dig for items underground, including fruits, vegetables, and other items, indicated by two circles appearing in the bottom of the screen (blue for plot-related items and yellow for generic things). This ability is mandatory for the tasks, most of which requires the player to search for items; non-plot related items can be recorded in an encyclopedia owned by an NPC, rewarding the player with bones. Additionally, the player can fish and catch insects by successfully beating a short minigame beforehand; again, the animals gained can be exchanged with the NPC for bones. Bones as they are referred to, the game's currency, are also rewarded after task completion, and can be used to buy healing items, accessories, and clothing.

The player can explore 23 locations, one of which is only used for the prologue section and a brief plot-related visit midgame, while another is only visited as part of the end-game dungeon, a point of no return. While most locations contain enemies, there are several that acts as a hub, where there is no enemy and the player can buy items or sleep, which fully replenishes their HP. Sleeping is for free when done in their house in Pupsville; otherwise, the player has to pay a bone. The player can also save through a mailbox and store items in a chest for later use (the game only permits a number of items in the inventory) in the hubs. After clearing a story task, the player can talk with an NPC called Boris, who can deliver the player between certain locations for a bone fee. Boris can be spotted in all hubs and some hostile areas. Additionally, a letter system is featured, where the player can receive and reply to letters as part of the tasks, though this can only be done in Pupsville.

On the Wii, the character is controlled by use of the Wii Remote moving an on-screen cursor around. On the PlayStation 2 version, it is through free movement via the controller.

== Plot ==
The player is a dog who lives with their mother, Mar, and younger sibling, Emilio/Maria (depending on the gender chosen) in Puroro Town. Emilio/Maria is sick with a disease that makes them unable to have much time to play outside; their father, Doluk, had travelled in search of a cure, but he never returned. Nevertheless, Emilio/Maria is rebellious and sneaks out to watch their older sibling as they participate in the town's festival that night, only to collapse from exhaustion after getting overexcited. The player decides to take matters into their own hands by sailing with a crew to The Dog Island to meet with Dr. Potan, a famed doctor; after the local doctor admits that there is nothing that they can do to stop Emilio/Maria's condition from worsening in the meantime. However, on the way there, the ship is a caught in a storm and the player is separated from the others after jumping into the ocean in an act of defiance after the local sea captain El Dorado calls off the mission during the storm.

The player is rescued and wakes up in the company of Amalia, a resident of Pupsville, The Dog Island's main village. They also befriend an anc, creatures normally invisible to dogs, called Petasi, who was exiled by his queen for his mischief; to return to the Anc Land, he will have to raise a tree by doing good deeds. They proceed to meet with Dr. Potan, who eventually agrees to go to Puroro Town with a cure. However, even Dr. Potan's cure is not potent enough to cure Emilio/Maria. Instead, Dr. Potan suggests a search for the Legendary Flower, allegedly capable of healing everything, back in The Dog Island.

The player learns from Obaba, a traditional healer, that the Legendary Flower is well-hidden and can only be found by dogs who are in touch with nature. The player begins learning sniffing from several masters, including Yi Lu, Rode, and finally, the Grand Master Tao, all of whom tell the player that to become a Master, they need to raise the Anc Tree by helping dogs in need. Once the player raises the tree to enough height, Tao tells the player to find a medal in Kunka Ruins, with which they can access Ancient Grove, a sanctuary of flowers that houses the Legendary Flower. Unfortunately, the flower is found wilted.

Thanks to the growth of the Anc Tree, Petasi is allowed to return to the Anc Land, where he goes to with the player. They learn from the Anc Queen that the flower is wilted because the residents of The Dog Island have forgotten to get in touch with nature, which is simultaneously causing the crust that protects their world to break. To strengthen it back, they will have to hold the Star Festival. She sends the player and Petasi to a deeper portion of Kunka Ruins, where the Stone of the Heavens, a regalia of the festival, is stored. After retrieving the stone and battling a skeleton guardian, the player narrowly manages to escape the ruins before proceeding to hold the festival with the island residents using the stone. This act rejuvenates both the crust and the Legendary Flower. Going back home, the player bids Petasi goodbye.

The end credits show the player giving the flower to Dr. Potan, who uses it to cure Emilio/Maria. In a post-credits scene, Doluk returns home and, to the player's surprise, has brought Petasi in tow.

== Reception ==
Reception

Aggregate score
Aggregator	Score	
Aggregator	PS2	Wii
Metacritic	58/100	70/100

Review scores
Publication	Score	
Publication	PS2	Wii
Famitsu	25/40	24/40
GameZone	N/A	7.4/10
IGN	N/A	7/10
NGamer	N/A	64%
PALGN	6.5/10	N/A
PSM3	51%	N/A

The game received "mixed or average reviews" on both platforms according to the review aggregation website Metacritic. IGN described the game as "a seriously odd title", but stated that "it's the overall size and robust feel of the game that actually makes it worth a second look." Regarding the Wii version of the game, "The Dog Island proves a very important point about Wii. There's nothing wrong with casual-centric titles, as long as they're made well." In Japan, Famitsu gave the game a score of 25 out of 40 for the PlayStation 2 version, and 24 out of 40 for the Wii version.
