= WWE SmackDown vs. Raw Online =

Free-to-play online wrestling video game

- The logo for the SmackDown vs. Raw series
- Developer(s): Vertigo Games
- Publisher(s): THQ
- Platform(s): Microsoft Windows
- Release: Cancelled
- Genre(s): Sports
- Mode(s): Single-player, multiplayer

WWE SmackDown vs. Raw Online was a free-to-play professional wrestling video game previously under development by Vertigo Games that was to be published by THQ for Microsoft Windows, specifically for the South Korean market.

== History ==
The project was to be the first SmackDown vs. Raw game ever on PC. It would have marked THQ's fourth game in development exclusively for the growing PC online market. It was promoted as part of the WWE SmackDown vs. Raw series. Though by May 2009 it was renamed WWE Online with ties to the series severed, at the E3 2010 event it was revealed to have been reverted. On February 2, 2011, THQ held its quarterly earnings conference call and announced that the game was cancelled.

== Gameplay ==
With WWE SmackDown. vs. Raw Online, players were to be able to connect with other players online to challenge them to a match, interact, or shop with them, which would have included buying each other's brands and wrestlers. The game was to feature both a single mode and a multiplayer one. The player could play as a WWE wrestler or create an original wrestler in search of fame, respect and virtual wealth, in order to reach the final rating for the Hall of Fame. The player would get points that would be used to unlock features, items and level ups. The player could also purchase additional items, abilities and clothing to improve their character.

The Create-a-Wrestler feature, which has been included in past WWE games, was to be implemented into this game. Players would be able to create their own wrestlers and use them in the game. This would include Create-a-Taunt, Create-a-Moveset, Create-an-Arena, Create-a-Finisher, Create-an-Entrance and a brand new 3D Paint Tool that would allow users to import .JPG, .GIF, .PNG, and .PSD files for use in the game.

== See also ==
- List of video games in the WWE 2K Games series
- WWE 2K
