= Stephanie McMahon =

American businesswoman and professional wrestler (born 1976)

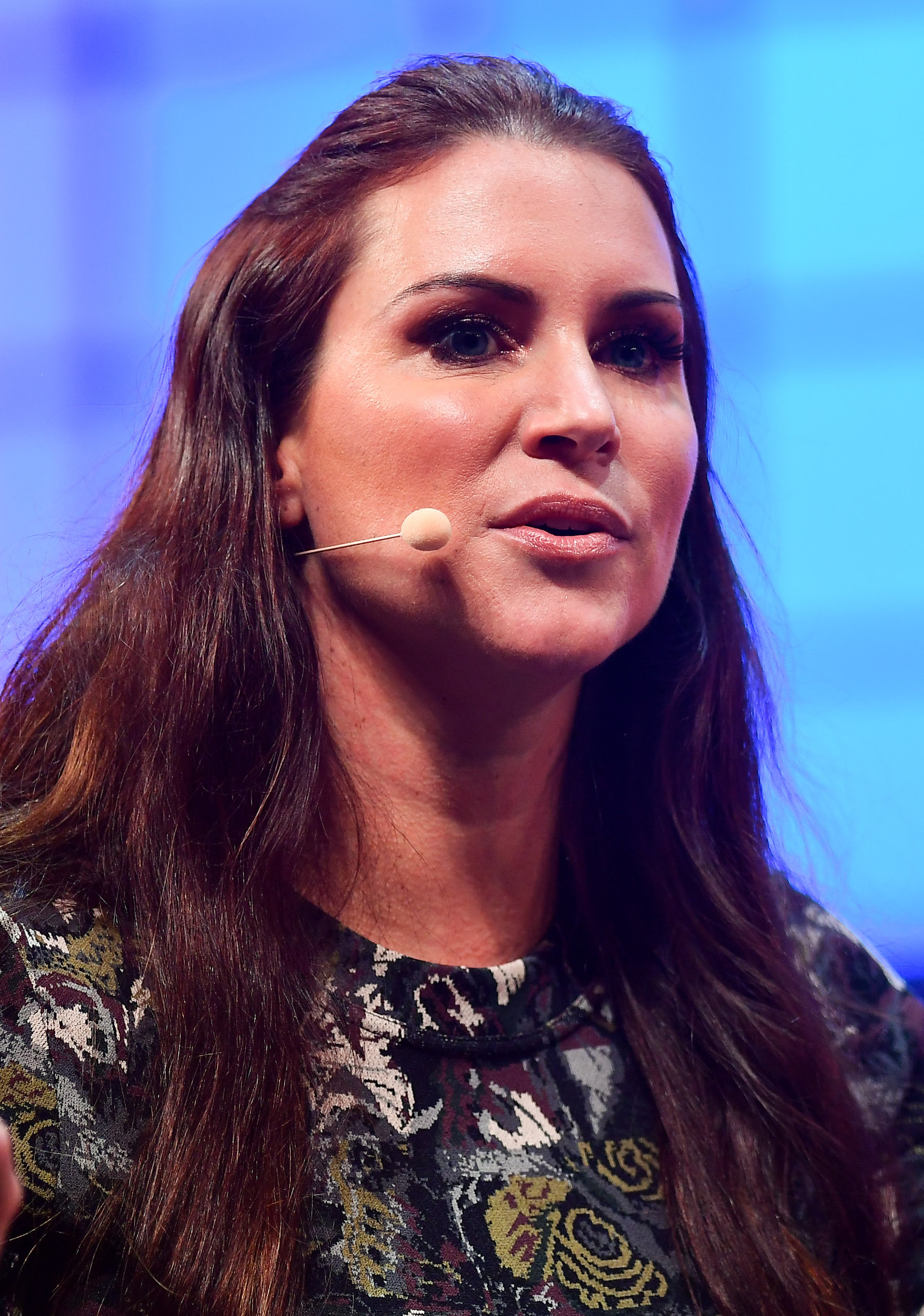
- McMahon in 2018
- Born: Stephanie Marie McMahon; September 24, 1976 (age 50); Hartford, Connecticut, U.S.
- Education: Boston University (BS)
- Occupations: Businesswoman; professional wrestler
- Years active: 1989–present (business); 1998–2018 (wrestling)
- Title: Co-founder of Connor's Cure
- Political party: Republican Party
- Board member of: Ad Council (2020–present); Children's Hospital of Pittsburgh Foundation (2015–present); USO Metropolitan Washington (2011–present); WWE (2015–2023)
- Spouse: Paul Levesque (m. 2003)
- Children: 3
- Parents: Vince McMahon; Linda McMahon
- Family: McMahon
- Professional wrestling career
- Ring names: Stephanie McMahon; Stephanie McMahon-Helmsley
- Billed height: 5 ft 8 in (1.73 m)
- Billed weight: 143 lb (65 kg)
- Billed from: Greenwich, Connecticut
- Debut: June 27, 1998
- Retired: April 8, 2018

Signature
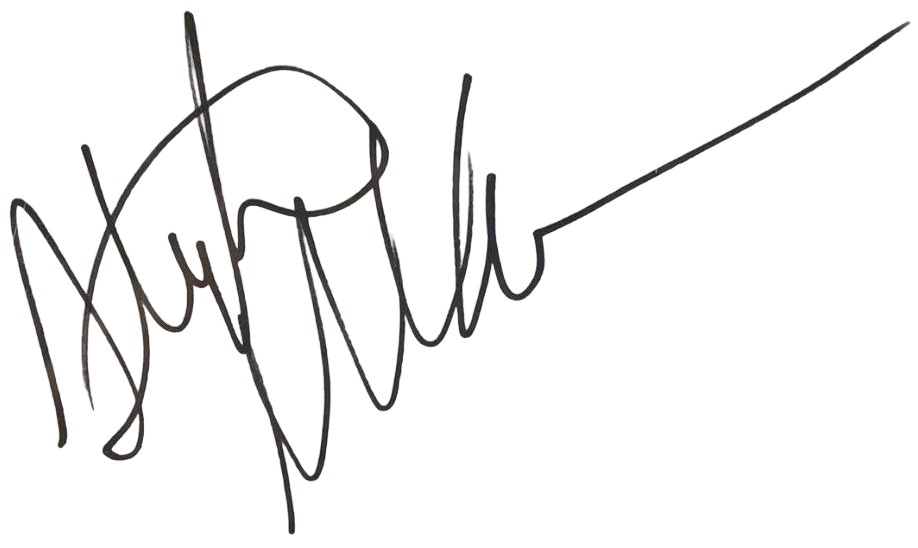

Stephanie Marie McMahon Levesque (/məkˈmæn ləˈvɛk/ mək-MAN lə-VEK; née McMahon; born September 24, 1976) is an American businesswoman and retired professional wrestler. She is known for her various roles within WWE between 1998 and 2023.

The daughter of Vince and Linda McMahon, she is a fourth-generation wrestling promoter as a member of the McMahon family. She began working for WWE at 13, modeling merchandise for catalogs. McMahon began appearing regularly on-air for WWE (then the World Wrestling Federation (WWF) in 1999 as a part of a storyline with The Undertaker. After a brief on-screen relationship with Test, McMahon became engaged to Triple H – whom she married both on-screen and later in real life – which resulted in the McMahon-Helmsley faction storyline.

She held the WWF Women's Championship once. In 2001, she was the on-screen owner of Extreme Championship Wrestling during The Invasion. The following year, she was the general manager of SmackDown, but stopped appearing regularly on television after an "I Quit" match with her father.

After making only sporadic appearances for several years, McMahon began appearing regularly on Raw in 2008 as the franchise general manager before disappearing again. She returned to regular on-air appearances in 2013, this time under the gimmick of an unctuous, judgmental, bullying owner along with on-screen chief operating officer Triple H. As a power couple, they formed the stable The Authority, making often shady decrees they stated were "what's best for business" and indulging in public displays of affection. McMahon wrestled her final in-ring match at WrestleMania 34 in April 2018, after which she continued to focus on executive roles within the company.

McMahon's business career began as an account executive for the WWF offices in New York, before becoming the company's head writer and director of creative writing. In 2006, she was promoted to senior vice president of creative writing. A year later, she became the executive vice president of creative. From 2013 to 2022, McMahon served as the company's chief brand officer. In July 2022, McMahon was briefly named CEO and chairwoman, and later the co-CEO of WWE alongside Nick Khan, following her father's retirement due to accusations of sex trafficking and harassment paying hush money. She resigned from WWE in January 2023 following her father's return to the company.

== Early life ==
Stephanie Marie McMahon was born in Hartford, Connecticut, on September 24, 1976, to professional wrestling promoters Vince and Linda McMahon. She has an older brother, Shane. McMahon and her family are Irish American, and she has expressed pride of her Irish heritage. During a WWE live event in Dublin in 2004, she revealed that her family originally came from County Clare. Her great-grandfather, Jess McMahon, was born to Irish parents who had emigrated from Galway to New York City during the 1870s.

Soon after McMahon's birth, her family moved to Greenwich, Connecticut, where she attended Greenwich Country Day School through her elementary years. She started working for World Wrestling Federation (WWF) at the age of 13 as a model for merchandise catalogs. After graduating from Greenwich High School in 1994, McMahon attended Boston University, graduating in 1998 with a Bachelor of Science degree in communications. She became a full-time WWF employee post-graduation.

== Business career ==
=== World Wrestling Federation/Entertainment/WWE ===
==== Early positions ====
McMahon entered the World Wrestling Federation (WWF) as a model for the sales and merchandise department, and began her business career as an account executive for the WWF offices in New York. In her early years with the company, she did reception work, creative design, television production, and acted as a ring performer. In November 2000, McMahon became head writer of the company, replacing Chris Kreski. After spending time as the director of creative writing, a job she began 2002, she was promoted to Senior Vice President of Creative Writing in 2006.

==== Executive Vice President ====
McMahon was promoted to executive vice president of creative in 2007. She was responsible for overseeing the creative process (storylines) for all television and pay-per-view programming and oversaw all aspects of talent management and branding, live event booking and marketing, and social and digital media properties.

McMahon spearheaded the development of the WWE app, which has been downloaded over 20 million times. She also launched a partnership with the USO metropolitan Washington, the social media company Tout, and a partnership with Yahoo to deliver WWE content. McMahon also led WWE's Creative coalition for anti bullying campaigns.

==== Chief brand officer ====
On December 4, 2013, WWE announced McMahon's promotion to chief brand officer, to lead efforts to further enhance WWE's brand reputation among key stakeholders including advertisers, media, business partners, and investors. She also serves as the lead ambassador for WWE and works with business units to support key growth initiatives. McMahon also leads WWE's targeted youth and moms marketing programs.

McMahon's new position enabled her to spearhead the continued partnership with General Mills' Totino's brand.

On February 5, 2014, McMahon, along with CMO and CRO Michelle Wilson, announced a partnership between WWE and KaBOOM! to build a playground for WWE's annual WrestleMania week in Louisiana.

In 2013, McMahon earned a combined salary of over $775,000 for her corporate role and work as an on-screen talent. She also owns over $77 million in WWE stock.

On April 15, 2014, during WWE's annual Business Partners Summit, McMahon confirmed that a new WWE logo would debut the night after WWE SummerSlam, although it was already appearing on WWE products including the WWE Network and NXT.

On August 5, 2014, at the Needham fireside conference, McMahon, alongside her husband Triple H and WWE Chief strategy and financial officer George Barrios, discussed the creative side of WWE, the WWE Network, and the difference between WWE and UFC.

On May 19, 2022, McMahon tweeted that she would be taking a leave of absence from the majority of her WWE responsibilities. She stated that she was taking time to focus on her family and that she looked forward to returning to the company in the near future.

==== Interim Chairwoman and CEO ====
On June 17, 2022, Vince McMahon stepped down as WWE's chairman and CEO amidst an investigation by WWE's board of directors into reported "hush money" paid to a former employee following an affair. Stephanie McMahon stepped in as interim chair and CEO.

==== Chairwoman and co-CEO ====
On July 22, 2022, Vince McMahon retired from WWE and named his daughter, Stephanie McMahon, the company's new chairwoman and co-CEO alongside Nick Khan. Triple H replaced Vince McMahon as head of WWE Creative. On January 10, 2023, McMahon resigned as co-CEO and from the company following her father's return as executive chairman.

== Professional wrestling career ==
=== World Wrestling Federation/Entertainment/WWE ===
==== McMahon-Helmsley Era (1999–2001) ====
In early 1999, at the suggestion of WWF writer Vince Russo, McMahon debuted as Vince McMahon's innocent and friendly daughter in an on-screen storyline involving Vince and The Undertaker. The Undertaker stalked and abducted McMahon at the end of the April Backlash pay-per-view, which culminated in him almost marrying her in the middle of the ring the next night on Raw, before she was rescued by Stone Cold Steve Austin.

McMahon then began an on-screen relationship with wrestler Test, which led to a rivalry between him and her older brother Shane. After Test defeated Shane at SummerSlam in a "Love Her Or Leave Her Match," McMahon and Test teamed-up for a match on September 20, 1999, with the couple defeating Jeff Jarrett and Debra. The couple were eventually engaged, but during the in-ring ceremony, Triple H showed a video that revealed he had drugged McMahon and taken her to Las Vegas, Nevada, where they were married in a drive-through ceremony. McMahon seemed to abhor Triple H at first, but at the inaugural Armageddon event, after Triple H defeated her father in a No Holds Barred Match, she embraced him and left the ring with him. McMahon confronted Vince the next night on Raw and revealed the wedding was a planned event, which was a revenge plot against her father for the aforementioned kidnappings, thus turning her into a heel character.

In late 1999, with Vince McMahon absent as a result of injuries inflicted upon him by Triple H at the Armageddon pay-per-view, Triple H and McMahon became the on-screen owners of the WWF, a period known as the "McMahon-Helmsley Era" (slightly different from the modern era of "The Authority") and dominated by the McMahon-Helmsley Faction. Triple H held the WWF Championship and McMahon held the WWF Women's Championship after defeating champion Jacqueline with the help of Tori and D-Generation X on the March 28 episode of SmackDown! McMahon successfully defended her title against Lita on SmackDown on June 6 and 16. McMahon reconciled with her father and brother at WrestleMania 2000 when they helped Triple H defend his title against The Rock, leaving Linda McMahon as the only fan-favorite in the McMahon family.

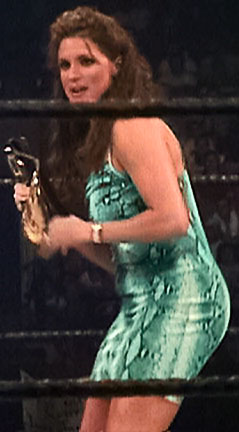
McMahon with the WWF Women's Championship at King of the Ring in 2000

In mid-2000, a love triangle storyline began featuring McMahon, Triple H and Kurt Angle. The storyline continued at Unforgiven when Triple H defeated Angle with a Pedigree following a low blow from McMahon, proving her loyalty to him. McMahon later became Angle's manager and was in his corner when he defeated The Rock for the WWF Championship at No Mercy. The alliance was short-lived, however, as after The Rock performed his Rock Bottom maneuver on McMahon at No Mercy, Triple H attacked Angle, considering it his fault that McMahon was hurt due to her managing Angle at the time. On the August 21, 2000, episode of Raw, McMahon lost the WWF's Women's Championship to Lita despite the interference from Angle and Triple H after special referee, The Rock, performed a spinebuster on McMahon.

The internal disputes between the McMahons led to Linda McMahon being comatose and wheel-chair bound due to the stress of being asked for a divorce by Vince, who took the opportunity to have a public affair with Trish Stratus. McMahon briefly feuded with Stratus, defeating her at No Way Out. Over the next few weeks, Vince made it clear that he favored McMahon over Stratus, allowing McMahon to bully and verbally abuse Stratus. At WrestleMania X-Seven, Shane McMahon defeated Vince in a street fight. During the match, Stratus slapped Vince and chased Stephanie from ringside, apparently upset with Vince's constant misogynistic treatment of her.

==== The Invasion and kayfabe divorce from Triple H (2001–2002) ====
McMahon later revealed that she had purchased Extreme Championship Wrestling (ECW) and intended to bankrupt the WWF (in reality, the ownership of ECW assets at this time was highly disputed), along with her brother Shane, who had become the on-screen owner of World Championship Wrestling (WCW), and the two rosters merged to form a "supergroup" known as The Alliance.

Her team, The Alliance, consisting of her brother Shane, former WCW Champion Booker T, Rob Van Dam, Kurt Angle and Stone Cold Steve Austin was defeated by Team WWF consisting of The Undertaker, Kane, Big Show, Chris Jericho and The Rock at Survivor Series in a five-on-five, Winner Takes All elimination match. The night after The Alliance was defeated, Shane and Stephanie were banished from WWF television. McMahon returned in January 2002 when Triple H made a comeback as a fan-favorite, but the couple began having problems when McMahon began acting like a nagging and clingy wife.

As part of the storyline, the couple "divorced" after McMahon claimed to be pregnant to trick Triple H into renewing their marital vows. Triple H later discovered that she was lying though and left her at the altar during the renewal ceremony. As a result, after Triple H won the Royal Rumble, McMahon appointed herself as the special guest referee in a match between Kurt Angle and Triple H at No Way Out with Triple H's WrestleMania Undisputed WWF Championship shot on the line. Though Angle won due to McMahon's biased officiating, Triple H defeated him the next night to regain his title shot. McMahon then aligned herself with former enemy, Chris Jericho. Despite interference by McMahon, Jericho lost to Triple H at WrestleMania X8 on March 17. On the March 25 episode of Raw, Jericho and McMahon lost to Triple H in a Triple Threat match for the Undisputed WWF Championship, with the stipulation that, if McMahon was pinned, she would be forced to leave the WWF. In the match, McMahon came within a one count of becoming the first female WWE Champion in a pin on Jericho, but was ultimately pinned by Triple H.

==== SmackDown! general manager (2002–2003) ====
On July 18, 2002, McMahon returned to the WWE (formerly WWF until a lawsuit from the World Wildlife Fund) as the general manager of SmackDown! In contrast to her McMahon-Helmsley era villain character, McMahon became a fan favorite, as she began to favor fan-favorite wrestlers and feuded with Raw general manager Eric Bischoff. On the October 31, 2002, episode of SmackDown! McMahon and Bischoff shared a kiss at a Halloween party while McMahon was dressed as a witch and Bischoff was disguised as her father underneath a mask. McMahon was given credit for the return of the WWE United States Championship and for the creation of the WWE Tag Team Championship. She was also credited with signing Hulk Hogan back to SmackDown!, which caused friction between herself and her father.

In the summer of 2003, Vince McMahon began to resent McMahon's attempts to stop him from pursuing an affair with Sable. In a controversial segment of SmackDown!, John Cena requested that Stephanie rip Sable's top off and that he be allowed to slap Stephanie's buttocks; she agreed to it and he slapped her buttocks, after which she went backstage, fought Sable, and ripped Sable's top off briefly exposing Sable's breasts on air. The feud culminated in the controversial first ever father-daughter "I Quit" match at No Mercy. McMahon was accompanied in the match by her mother, the CEO of WWE, Linda McMahon, and Sable accompanied Vince. McMahon lost when Linda, at ringside threw in a towel on her behalf because Vince did not release a choke he had on her with a lead pipe. As a result of losing the match, McMahon was forced to step down as SmackDown! general manager. The storyline was written to remove McMahon from storylines as she was marrying Triple H that week.

==== Sporadic appearances (2005–2007) ====
McMahon returned as a villainess once again on October 3, 2005, for Raw Homecoming, where she confronted Stone Cold Steve Austin and received a Stunner. On October 10, 2005, she, along with her father and, in a surprise twist, her mother, fired Raw announcer Jim Ross.

A visibly pregnant McMahon also returned on the March 6, 2006, episode of Raw, approaching Shawn Michaels backstage and claiming to have abdominal pains. When Michaels left to get her some water, McMahon pulled a bottle out of her brassiere and poured it into Michael's water bottle. The unknown substance caused him to become groggy during his match against Shane later in the night, which he lost. McMahon also appeared at the WWE Hall of Fame induction ceremony on April 1, 2006, and in a backstage vignette with her immediate family at WrestleMania 22.

McMahon returned during a backstage segment in April 2007 at WrestleMania 23, visiting her father before his "Battle of the Billionaires" match. After her father returned to Raw after faking his own death, McMahon publicly revealed that her father had an illegitimate child who was among WWE's roster. On the taped edition of Raw that aired September 3, 2007, McMahon, along with her mother Linda and her brother Shane, made several appearances to confront Mr. McMahon about the child, who was later revealed to be Hornswoggle, who became a fan favorite. On Raw's 15 Year Anniversary episode, she appeared along with Shane in a segment—also involving her husband Triple H and Hornswoggle—which ended with her kissing her real-life husband Triple H, to humiliate her father on Raw.

==== Raw general manager (2008–2009) ====
After the severe injuries sustained by Vince on the June 23, three-hour edition of Raw, Shane appeared to request the Raw Superstars to stand together during what was a "turbulent time.". Shane's plea was ignored, and for the next two weeks, McMahon and Shane urged the superstars to show solidarity. The following week, Shane announced Mike Adamle as the new Raw general manager.

After Adamle stepped down as general manager, McMahon took charge of the brand and reignited her feud by having altercations with Chris Jericho in the following weeks, which involved her firing him (though he was later reinstated). After her father Vince returned, the family began a feud with Randy Orton, who began the storyline by punting Vince in the head. After a few weeks of feuding, Orton and his alliance, The Legacy, punted Shane in the head and performed an RKO on McMahon. Following the attack, he [who?] was chased out of the ring by Triple H. The rivalry between Orton, the Legacy and the McMahons heated up when Orton attacked and kissed Stephanie. Triple H and the Legacy's rivalry continued at WrestleMania 25, where Triple H defended the WWE Championship against Orton. The following month, Orton won the championship at Backlash. After Backlash, McMahon left Raw and took a hiatus from WWE television.

==== Sporadic appearances (2010–2013) ====
McMahon appeared on the November 1 episode of Raw in a pre-taped segment, where she dreamt that Vince awoke from a coma after his doctor, played by actor and one-time WWE employee Freddie Prinze Jr., informed him that his wife Linda had invested millions in her campaign for a senate seat. Vince's heart rate elevated as Prinze informed him of what was "wrong" with WWE since he went into a coma. After beginning to feel better, Vince realized that he had a serious case of "the runs" and when he walked to the bathroom, his backside was covered by campaign signs. McMahon awoke from her dream and asked her husband if Vince was still in a coma, to which Triple H replied "Yeah, he's in a coma; I'm pretty sure he's brain dead." McMahon responded by saying "Thank God," and then laid back down.

McMahon made an appearance as a guest speaker at the WrestleMania XXVII Press Conference. Several months later, she appeared in a backstage segment at SummerSlam to wish CM Punk luck in his match. Upon offering to shake his hand, Punk declined and insulted her: "I would, but ... I know where that hand's been." The following night on Raw, McMahon appeared backstage with CM Punk and threatened him: "... in the end, people always get what they deserve."

On July 23, 2012, McMahon made an appearance on the 1000th episode of Raw where she confronted and then slapped Paul Heyman to convince him to accept a match between Brock Lesnar and Triple H at SummerSlam. On April 6, 2013, McMahon inducted former on-screen rival Trish Stratus into the WWE Hall of Fame.

On June 3, 2013, McMahon made an appearance to reveal her decision not to allow Triple H to compete that night. On the June 17 episode of Raw, McMahon confronted new Divas Champion AJ Lee. On the July 8 episode of Raw, McMahon fired Vickie Guerrero from the position of Raw Managing Supervisor when the WWE Universe voted "Failed" during Guerrero's job evaluation.

==== The Authority (2013–2015) ====
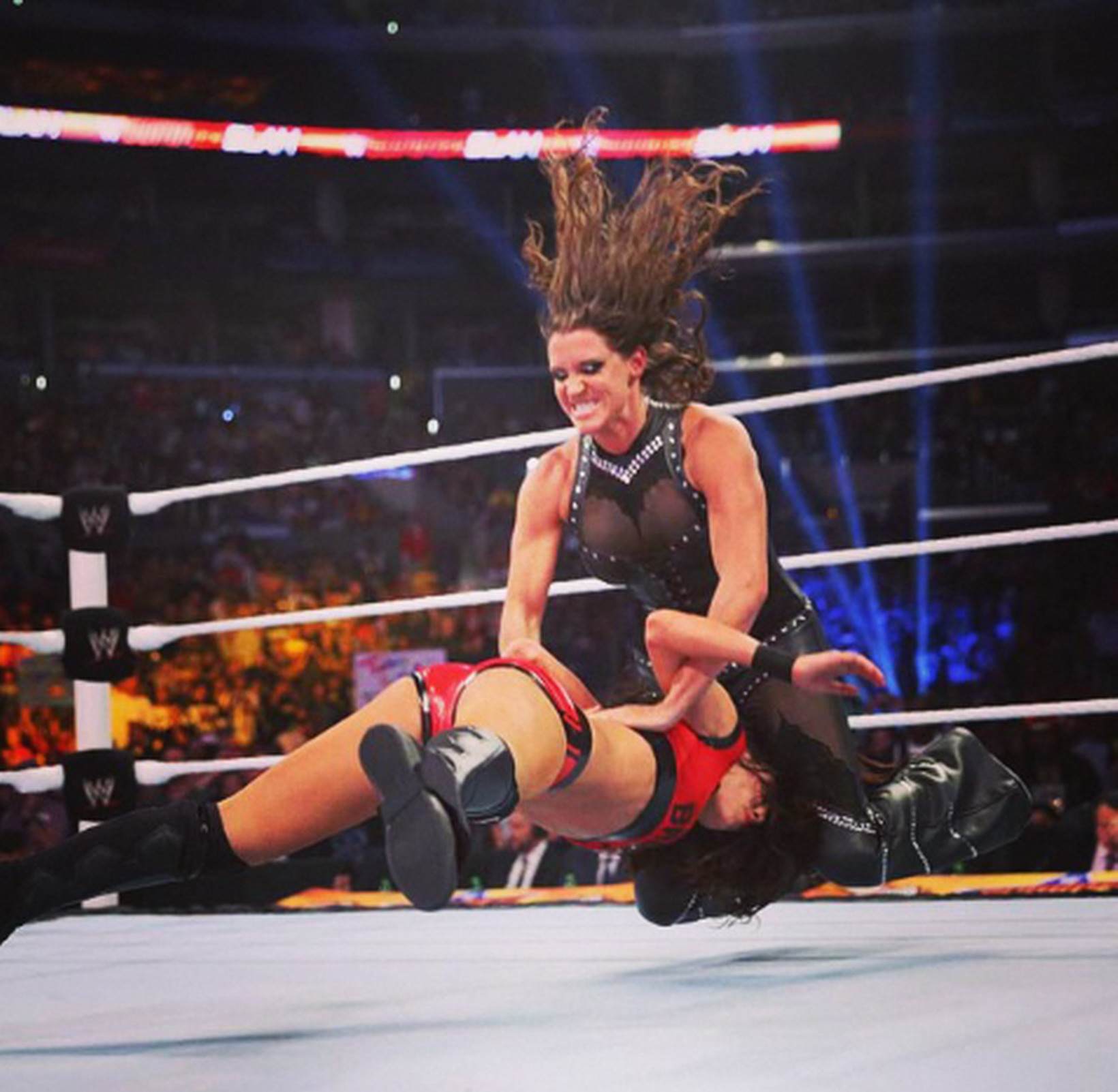
McMahon in 2014

On the August 19, 2013 episode of Raw, McMahon turned heel when she interrupted Daniel Bryan and supported the actions of her husband at SummerSlam the previous night, telling Bryan that he wasn't suitable to be the face of the company. Later in the night McMahon stood beside Triple H and her father as they celebrated Randy Orton's WWE Championship Coronation, during which Daniel Bryan was attacked by The Shield and subsequently by Orton. In November 2013, McMahon signed a three-year performer's contract with the WWE, confirming her as a regular on its programming. She and Triple H continued to rule the company as a controlling "power couple" dubbed The Authority. Swearing that their actions were "best for business", the pair belittled and punished any talent that went against their ideology, and formed a particular vendetta against Daniel Bryan. McMahon was at ringside when Triple H lost to Bryan at WrestleMania XXX.

In June 2014, as part of the ongoing storyline with Bryan, McMahon threatened to fire his wife Brie Bella if Bryan did not relinquish the WWE World Heavyweight Championship, which forced Brie to quit before slapping McMahon in the face. On the June 16 episode of Raw, Roman Reigns spiked the coffee Vickie Guerrero gave to McMahon, causing Stephanie to throw up on Vickie and leave with Triple H to the hospital. Vickie later gave Reigns a chance in the battle royal, which he would win. On the June 23 episode of Raw, Vickie lost in a pudding match against McMahon with her job on the line, after interference by Alicia Fox, Layla and Rosa Mendes. Vickie ultimately lost the match and was fired; however, she got her retribution over McMahon by throwing her into the mud pool. After Brie quit, McMahon put Brie's sister Nikki in several handicap matches as punishment. Brie returned to television on the July 21 episode of Raw, appearing in the crowd leading to a confrontation between the two. McMahon was (kayfabe) arrested and charged with assault and battery, because she slapped Brie, who was not a (kayfabe) WWE employee. The following week, McMahon granted Brie her job back and a match at SummerSlam against her to get Brie to drop the lawsuit. On the August 4 episode of Raw, after their contract signing, McMahon pedigreed both twins. At SummerSlam, Nikki turned on Brie, allowing Stephanie to hit a pedigree on Brie having Stephanie win her first pay per view match in over 10 years.

On the October 27 episode of Raw, after John Cena, top contender for the WWE World Heavyweight Championship, rejected an offer to join the Authority, Triple H announced a Traditional Survivor Series tag team elimination match with a team representing the Authority facing a team captained by Cena. On the November 3 episode of Raw, Vince McMahon announced that if Team Authority loses at Survivor Series, the Authority will be ousted from power. During the match, Triple H tried to get the last member of Team Cena, Dolph Ziggler, eliminated by attacking two referees and placing Seth Rollins (who was also the final member of Team Authority) on top of Ziggler and calling crooked referee Scott Armstrong into the ring to make the count; however, the debuting Sting came out and attacked Armstrong and Triple H, giving Team Cena the win and thus disbanding The Authority. Stephanie and Triple H appeared on the episode of Raw after Survivor Series stating that without them the company would be driven to the ground. They were then escorted out of the arena by the returning Daniel Bryan and only to be insulted by Mr.McMahon for letting him down and the McMahon family before exiting the arena. On the December 29 episode of Raw, The Authority was brought back in power by John Cena, and she and her husband entered and stepped on the entrance ramp celebrating their return with a glass of champagne and a kiss. Stephanie and Triple H then proceeded to fire Erick Rowan, Ryback and Dolph Ziggler.

On the July 13, 2015, episode of Raw, Stephanie interrupted Team Bella (The Bella Twins and Alicia Fox) to introduce Becky Lynch, Charlotte, and then-NXT Women's Champion Sasha Banks, calling for a "revolution" in the WWE Divas division. While Lynch and Charlotte allied with Paige, Banks would ally with Tamina and Naomi, leading to a brawl between the three teams.

On the February 22, 2016, episode of Raw, Mr. McMahon presented the "Vincent J. McMahon Legacy of Excellence" award to Stephanie. Before she could start her acceptance speech, Shane McMahon returned for the first time since 2009 and demanded to gain control of Raw, claiming The Authority was running the company to the ground. Mr. McMahon accepted the offer, only if he won one more match. Shane accepted, and Mr. McMahon announced he would wrestle at WrestleMania 32 against The Undertaker inside Hell in a Cell. On the post-WrestleMania episode of Raw on April 4, Mr. McMahon opened the show to announce that his returning son, Shane, would run Raw for one night only. However, Shane continued to run Raw due to "overwhelming fan support" until the April 25 episode of Raw, when Stephanie returned to announce that Mr. McMahon would decide who'd permanently control Raw at Payback. Mr. McMahon announced that both Stephanie and Shane would run Raw together on a permanent basis, thus disbanding The Authority.

==== Raw Commissioner (2016–2018) ====
On the July 11 episode of Raw, Mr. McMahon announced Stephanie as the commissioner of the Raw brand, while Shane was named commissioner of SmackDown for them to compete against each other in the upcoming reestablished brand extension. The following week on Raw, Stephanie appointed Mick Foley as the Raw general manager. The next week on Raw, Stephanie and Mick Foley announced the WWE Universal Championship would be the main championship on Raw.

On the October 11 episode of SmackDown, Commissioner Shane McMahon and general manager Daniel Bryan challenged Raw to three traditional Survivor Series elimination matches – involving each brand's best five male wrestlers, best five female wrestlers, and best five tag teams, respectively. The following week on Raw, Raw Commissioner Stephanie accepted the challenge. On the November 7 episode of Raw, Stephanie invited both Shane and Bryan to appear on the following week's Raw to address the interpromotional matches, which Shane and Bryan accepted. During this meeting, each commissioner and general manager touted the reasons why their respective brand was better and eventually called out their respective male teams. In the ensuing battle, Roman Reigns and Seth Rollins of Team Raw stood tall at the end. At Survivor Series, Team SmackDown defeated Team Raw, On the March 20 episode of Raw, Foley was fired as Raw general manager for his actions. In April, Stephanie was written out of the storyline after being pushed accidentally through a table at WrestleMania 33 by Triple H, and did not appear on WWE TV for many months. However, McMahon made a one-off appearance after Kevin Owens assaulted her father on the September 12 edition of SmackDown.

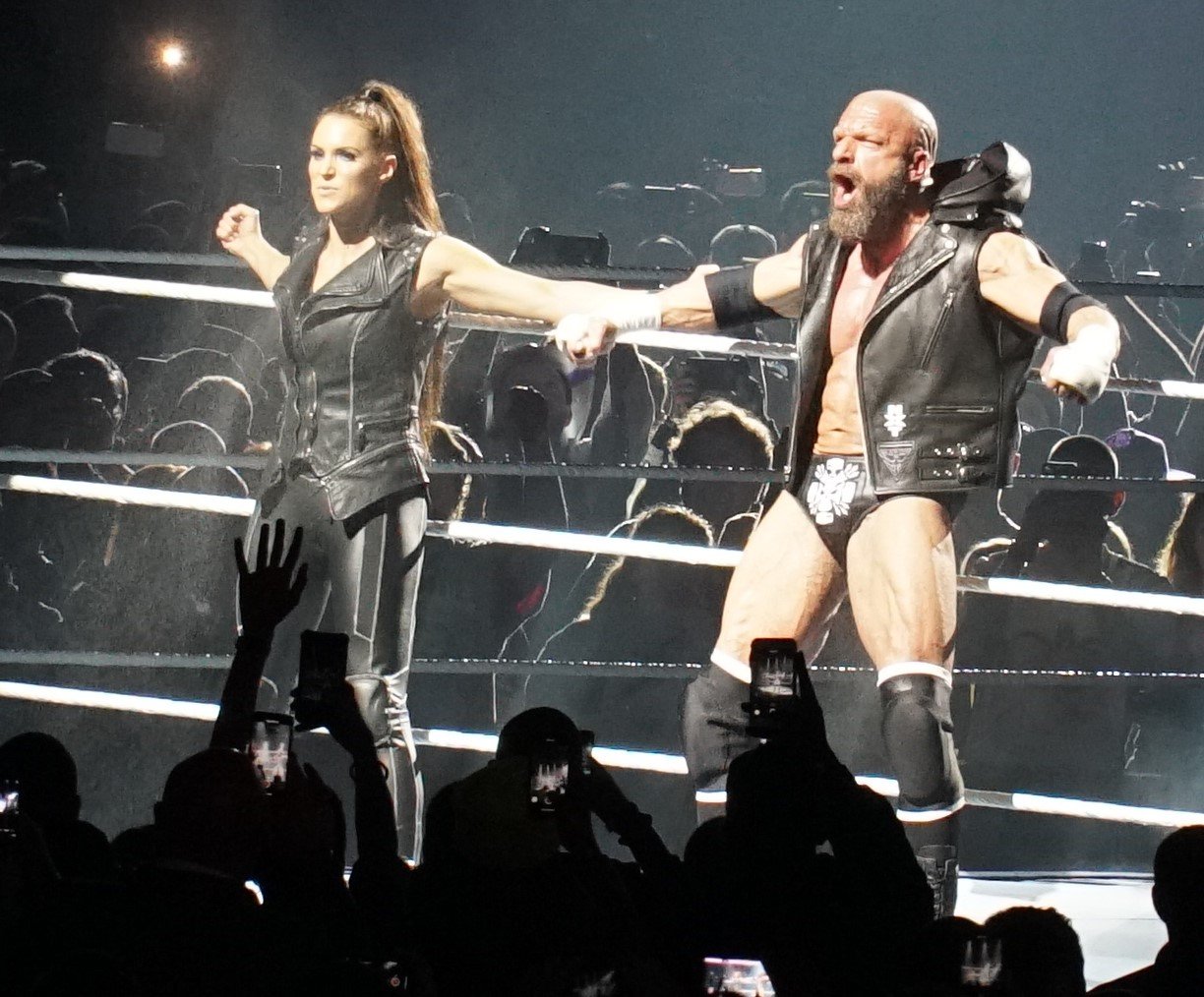
McMahon with her husband Triple H at WrestleMania 34

McMahon returned to Raw on the October 30, 2017, episode, confronting Raw general manager Kurt Angle regarding Shane and the Smackdown roster's attack on the Raw roster at the end of the previous week's Raw, naming him team captain for Raw at the Survivor Series pay-per-view, warning him that if Raw is not victorious over Smackdown at the pay-per-view, she was considering dismissing him from being Raw general manager. On the December 18 episode of Raw, after a six-woman tag team match between the team of Sasha Banks, Bayley, and Mickie James and Absolution (Paige, Mandy Rose, and Sonya Deville) ended in disqualification and a brawl ensued with the rest of the Raw women's roster (Alicia Fox, Asuka, Nia Jax, Dana Brooke, and Raw Women's Champion Alexa Bliss), Raw Commissioner Stephanie came out and the brawl stopped. Stephanie recapped the leaps that women's wrestling had taken the past few years, going from a revolution to the evolution of women's wrestling, including the first-ever women's Hell in a Cell match, the first-ever women's Money in the Bank ladder match, and women main eventing Raw and SmackDown. She then announced the first-ever women's Royal Rumble Match for the 2018 Royal Rumble with the winner receiving a match at WrestleMania 34 for either the Raw Women's Championship or SmackDown Women's Championship.

==== Sporadic appearances (2018–present) ====
Upon the signing of Ronda Rousey, McMahon embarked on a feud with her, leading to a mixed tag-team match at WrestleMania 34 against Rousey and Kurt Angle with her husband, Triple H as her partner. This was McMahon's first match since SummerSlam (2014) and her first-ever WrestleMania match. At the event, her team was defeated when she tapped out to Rousey's armbar. Following this loss, Stephanie would begin making only sporadic appearances on TV.

On the July 23 episode of Raw, McMahon returned to announce a match between Kevin Owens and Braun Strowman at the August 19 SummerSlam Pay Per View. The match was created with a stipulation that if Strowman loses the match in any way, he loses his Money in the Bank contract to Owens. On that same episode, McMahon also announced the upcoming all-women Evolution Pay Per View. On the September 24 edition of Raw, Stephanie returned as a face when she told Baron Corbin about the lack of leadership he had been doing and if he doesn't improve that she would bring back Kurt Angle from vacation. She also returned on the 1000th Episode of SmackDown on Truth TV.

On the November 12 episode of Raw, McMahon returned to rally Team Raw at the Survivor Series and confronted Braun Strowman to make the business proposition that if Team Raw was victorious, he would have a match with Baron Corbin and a Universal Championship rematch against Brock Lesnar.

On April 15, 2019, episode of Raw, McMahon turned heel once again by supporting her brother's actions against The Miz's father, telling fans that Kurt Angle had his last match, telling them to get over it, and insulting the Montreal crowd.

She was then seen as a more neutral character, appearing very sporadically. She announced the draft picks during the 2019 WWE Draft, and introduced the live broadcast of WrestleMania 36. On May 19, 2022, McMahon announced a leave of absence from the company, stating that she wished to spend time with her family. On June 17, 2022, Stephanie McMahon was announced as the interim chairwoman and CEO following an investigation by the board of directors into allegations of sexual misconduct towards her father, Vince McMahon. On July 22, 2022, upon her appointment as the permanent chairwoman of WWE following her father Vince's retirement, she returned on the following episode of SmackDown to thank the fans for their support on social media.

On January 10, 2023, McMahon announced her resignation from WWE upon her father's return as chairman of the company.

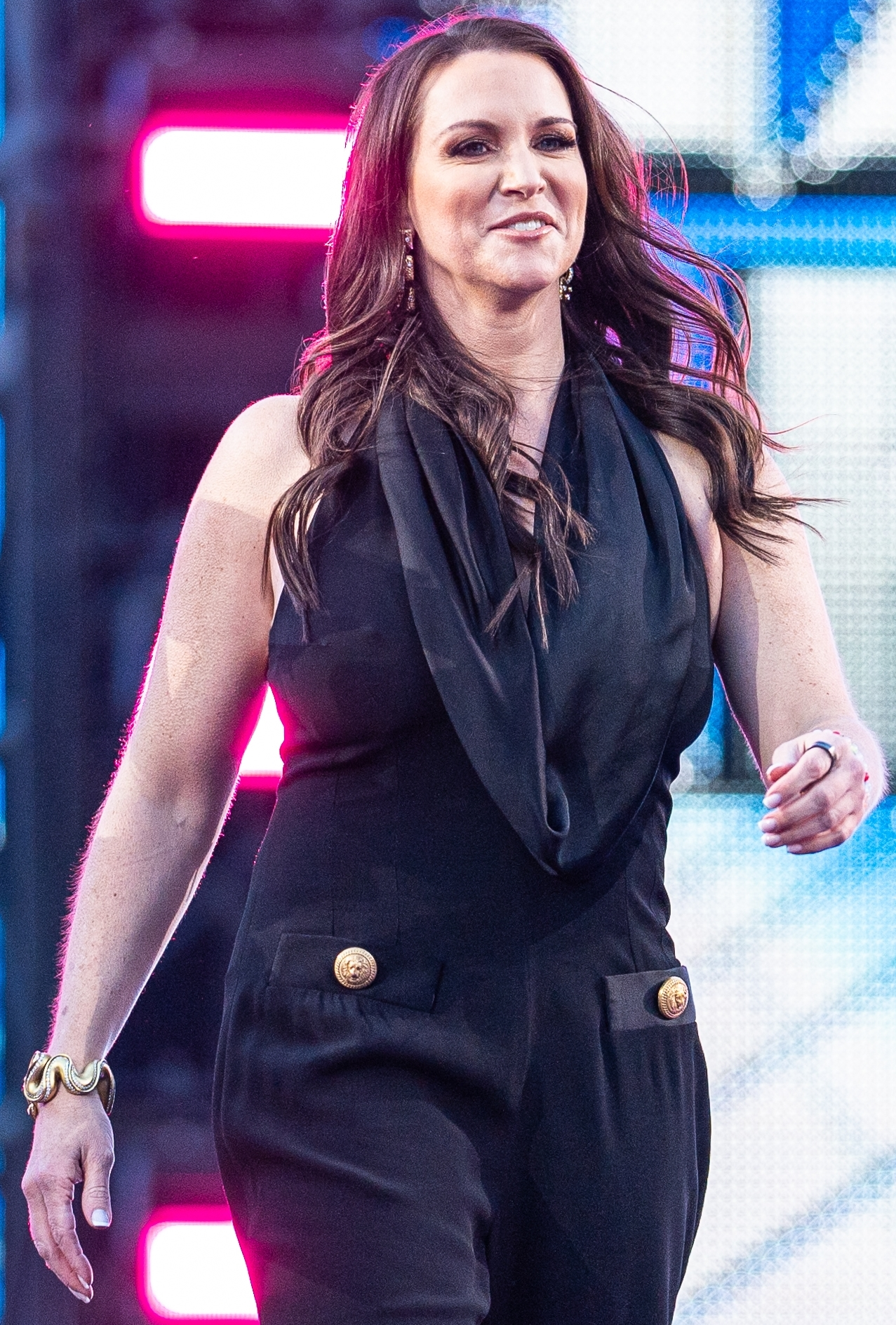
McMahon at WrestleMania XL

At WrestleMania XL, Stephanie made an unannounced return at the start of the show on Night 2 to welcome all fans in attendance. It was her first appearance since her father's resignation as chairman of the newly formed TKO Group Holdings, formed by the merger of the WWE and UFC in September 2023, amidst the controversial sex trafficking scandal involving a former WWE employee. She announced the draft picks during the 2024 WWE Draft in late April 2024. At SummerSlam in August 2024, Stephanie was in attendance among fans at ringside. In the post-event press conference, Triple H confirmed that she is not currently in a position within the company but did not rule out a return. At Evolution 2025, Stephanie was in attendance as Joe Tessitore's co-host for the event.

At Wrestlepalooza 2025, The Undertaker announced Stephanie as the first inductee into the 2026 WWE Hall of Fame. Stephanie was host of Saturday Night's Main Event XLIII as Joe Tessitore was unable to reach the venue due to the January 2026 North American winter storm. She would be inducted into the WWE Hall of Fame in April 2026.

== Other media ==
McMahon has appeared on The Howard Stern Show, Jimmy Kimmel Live!, and Opie and Anthony. In May 2000, Stephanie appeared at the WBCN River Rave on-stage with friend, Cali, to introduce Godsmack and sign autographs in the festival area. In November 2001, McMahon appeared on a special episode of NBC's The Weakest Link where WWF personalities competed against each other for their respective charities. She made it to the final two but lost to Triple H. On August 14, 2005, McMahon and Stacy Keibler appeared on the season five finale of MTV's Punk'd, where she assisted with a prank on Triple H.

On March 28, 2009, McMahon appeared alongside her mother on Business News Network's The Market Morning Show. McMahon has also made several appearances on various ESPN shows. On November 11, 2009, she appeared on an episode of Food Network's Dinner: Impossible alongside wrestler Big Show. In October 2013, Stephanie became the honorary chairperson for the Special Olympics of Connecticut.

McMahon has also appeared in numerous WWE video games which include: WWF WrestleMania 2000, WWF SmackDown!, WWF No Mercy, WWF SmackDown! 2: Know Your Role, WWF SmackDown! Just Bring It, WWE Raw 2, WWE WrestleMania X8, WWE SmackDown! Shut Your Mouth, WWE Crush Hour, WWE WrestleMania XIX, WWE SmackDown! Here Comes The Pain, WWE SmackDown vs. Raw 2007, WWE SmackDown vs. Raw 2008, WWE SmackDown vs. Raw 2009, WWE SmackDown vs. Raw 2011, WWE '13, WWE 2K14, WWE Immortals, WWE 2K16, WWE 2K17, WWE 2K18, WWE 2K19, WWE 2K20, WWE 2K Battlegrounds, WWE 2K22, WWE 2K23, WWE 2K24, WWE 2K25 and WWE 2K26.

McMahon was periodically featured during the first season of the E! television series Total Divas. On December 2, 2014, WWE released the WWE Fit Series, starring McMahon as a trainer in a fitness video designed for women. Triple H starred in a similar video for men titled WWE Power Series.

McMahon has appeared on promotional posters for WWE events such as the Royal Rumble of 2006 and the Elimination Chamber of 2014.

McMahon appeared in a voiceover role as herself in the direct-to-video animated film Scooby-Doo! and WWE: Curse of the Speed Demon.

In May 2016, McMahon announced via Twitter that she was writing her memoir, which was expected in 2020 but was never released.

In 2018, McMahon participated in a celebrity edition of the CBS reality series Undercover Boss, disguised as a new employee just starting out in the WWE business office.

As of 2025, she hosts ESPN+ talk show Stephanie's Places, interviewing WWE wrestlers about their journeys into the franchise. Also in 2025, McMahon launched the podcast What's Your Story? in partnership with WWE and Fanatics.

== Personal life ==
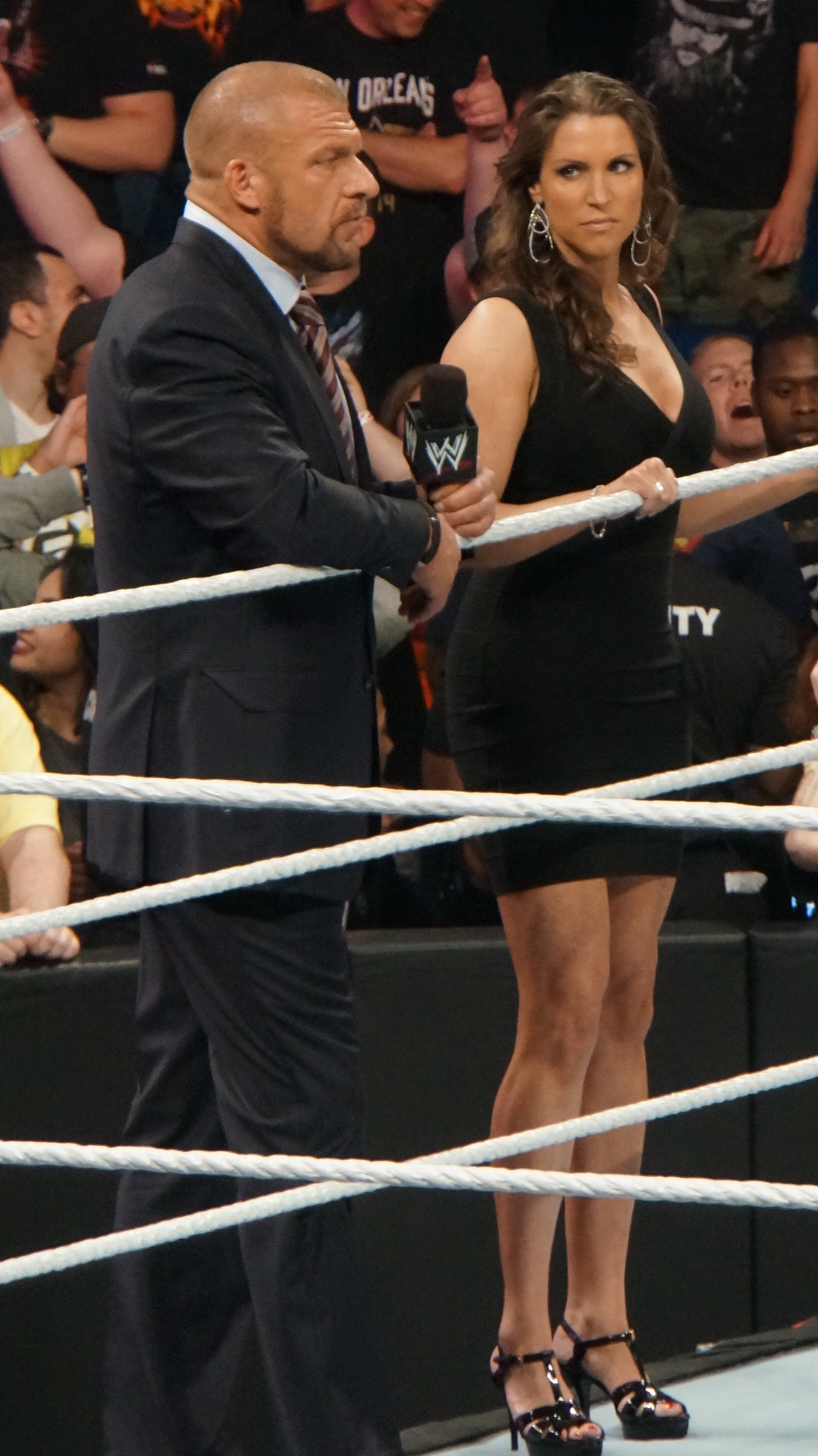
McMahon alongside her husband Triple H on Raw in 2014

McMahon began dating Paul Levesque, better known as Triple H, in 2000 during a scripted, on-screen romance. The couple were engaged on Valentine's Day in 2003 and married on October 25, 2003, in a Catholic ceremony at St. Teresa of Avila Church in Sleepy Hollow, New York. Stephanie took her husband's surname and legally changed her middle name to McMahon. The couple have three children.

McMahon is a Republican. She and Levesque donated $2,700 to former New Jersey governor Chris Christie's 2016 presidential campaign.

== Championships and accomplishments ==
- Pro Wrestling Illustrated
  - PWI Feud of the Year (2002) vs. Eric Bischoff
  - PWI Feud of the Year (2013) vs. Daniel Bryan as part of The Authority
  - PWI Most Hated Wrestler of the Year (2013) as part of The Authority
  - PWI Most Hated Wrestler of the Year (2014) – with Triple H
  - PWI Woman of the Year (2000)
- World Wrestling Federation / WWE
  - WWF Women's Championship (1 time)
  - WWE Hall of Fame (Class of 2026)
  - Slammy Awards (2 times)
    - Insult of the Year (2013) – for insulting Big Show
    - Rivalry of the Year (2014) – The Authority vs. Daniel Bryan
  - Vincent J. McMahon Legacy of Excellence Award (2016)
- Wrestling Observer Newsletter
  - Most Disgusting Promotional Tactic (2001) Comparing Vince McMahon's 1994 steroid indictment with the September 11 attacks in a promo
  - Most Disgusting Promotional Tactic (2003) McMahon family all over WWE products
  - Worst Non-Wrestling Personality (2001–2003)
  - Worst on Interviews (2001–2003)
  - Worst Feud of the Year (2013) – as member of The Authority vs. Big Show

=== Other honors ===
- Four-time Most Powerful Women in Cable honoree by Cable magazine – 2009, 2011, 2012, and 2013
- 2010: Fairfield County Business Journal 40 Under 40 Award
- 2013: Multichannel News Woman to Watch
- 2013: Honorary Chairperson of the Special Olympics of Connecticut.
- 2014: Broadcasting and Cable and Multichannel News "Women in the Game"
- 2014: Eisenhower United States fellow
- 2016: Digital Entertainment Executives to watch
- 2016: Multichannel News TV Wonder Woman
- 2017: Henry Crown Fellow
- 2017: Stuart Scott ENSPIRE Award
- 2019: Honorary Doctorate of Business Administration from Robert Morris University
- 2021: Inducted into the International Sports Hall of Fame

== Job titles ==
- Account executive and receptionist – 1998–2002
- Director, Creative Television – 2002–2006

Responsible for the creative design, plans, and initiatives for WWE television.

- Senior vice-president, Creative Writing – 2006–2007

Responsible for overseeing the creative writing process, development, and management of the World Wrestling Entertainment creative team.

- Executive vice-president, Creative Development and Operations – 2007–2013

Responsible for the creative development for all of WWE television including live and TV events and pay-per-views, as well as event bookings. Stephanie also served as a backstage producer/director.

- Chief brand officer – 2013–2022

Responsible for leading WWE's effort's and brand reputation among key constituencies including investors, media, business partners, and advertisers. As well as marketing mom and kids initiatives.

- Interim chief executive officer and interim Chairwoman – 2022
- Co-chief executive officer and Chairwoman – 2022–2023

== Reception and legacy ==
Over the years, McMahon has been recognized by Forbes in the publication's annual World's Most Influential CMO list, and in 2020 she was named the world's most influential female CMO, earning the No. 2 position overall. McMahon was named a Stuart Scott ENSPIRE Award Honoree at the 2017 ESPN Humanitarian Awards. Additionally, Adweek has included her in their list of the Most Powerful Women in Sports for the past five years and previously chose her as a 2019 Brand Genius honore.

Former WWE wrestler Shelly Martinez who wrestled in WWE under the ring name Ariel praised McMahon stating "Stephanie McMahon was always very straight-forward with me, and I liked it."

Business positions
Preceded by Vince McMahon	Chairwoman of WWE; 2022–2023	Succeeded by Vince McMahon as executive chairman
Preceded by Vince McMahon	CEO of WWE; 2022–2023; With: Nick Khan	Succeeded by Nick Khan
