= WWF SmackDown! (video game) =

2000 professional wrestling video game

- NTSC cover art featuring Chyna, The Rock, Billy Gunn and Mankind
- Developer: Yuke's
- Publishers: WW: THQ; JP: Yuke's
- Director: Toshihiko Kitazawa
- Producer: Sanders Keel
- Designers: Toshihiko Kitazawa; Daisuke Doi; Osamu Hashimoto
- Programmers: Tokuichi Kitaguchi; Shintaro Matsubara; Katsumi Nakagaki
- Artist: Taku Chihaya
- Composers: Masafumi Ogata; Kei Morioka; Rei Shimizu
- Series: SmackDown!
- Platform: PlayStation
- Release: NA: March 2, 2000; EU: April 14, 2000; JP: August 3, 2000
- Genre: Sports
- Modes: Single-player, multiplayer

WWF SmackDown!, known in Japan as Exciting Pro Wrestling (エキサイティングプロレス, Ekisaitingu Puro Resu), is a professional wrestling video game developed by Yuke's and released for the PlayStation by THQ. It is based on the World Wrestling Federation (WWF) and is named after the company's weekly SmackDown! television program. Originally released in North America on March 2, 2000, Europe on April 14, 2000, and Japan on August 3, 2000, the game received a direct sequel released several months later, entitled WWF SmackDown! 2: Know Your Role.

The first WWF game on the PlayStation to be published by THQ, SmackDown! marked the start of a long running series of WWE video games from THQ, then continued by 2K Sports and rebranded as WWE 2K. The game was also re-released under the Greatest Hits budget range.

== Gameplay ==
The game's main story mode contains three main parts, first with the Pre-Season (for created wrestlers), but after ten in-game years of playing the Pre-Season, players are allowed to skip it. By playing and advancing in the season modes players gain rewards such as unlockables or attires, but instead of unlocking new characters, players unlock new body parts to put on new creations, to play as that "unlocked" character. Once players build a creation, they must fight in a Pre-Season year to build their skills and make their alliances. The story mode contains no voice-overs, instead the characters meet each other backstage with mouths that move to no voice and on-screen cutscene text. The game also lacks play-by-play color commentary.

WWF SmackDown! has many match types including Single, Tag Team, Hardcore, Steel Cage and many more. The game features the late 1999 WWF roster following SmackDown!'s premiere, including the then-newcomers The Dudley Boyz.

== Development ==
Yuke's, the developer of SmackDown! had previously created the Toukon Retsuden series of wrestling games in Japan for New Japan Pro-Wrestling. Despite this, the game engine used in SmackDown! is not based on contemporary Toukon Retsuden titles, but rather The Pro Wrestling, a title developed by Yuke's as part of D3 Publisher's Simple series and released several months in Japan beforehand.

== Reception ==
Reception

Aggregate score
Aggregator	Score
GameRankings	87%

Review scores
Publication	Score
AllGame	3.5/5
Electronic Gaming Monthly	8.75/10 (Note: Two critics of Electronic Gaming Monthly gave the game each a score of 9/10, and two others gave it each a score of 8.5/10.)
EP Daily	8/10
Eurogamer	9/10
Famitsu	27/40
Game Informer	9/10
GameFan	90%
GameRevolution	A−
GameSpot	8.7/10
IGN	8.8/10
Next Generation	4/5
Official U.S. PlayStation Magazine	4.5/5

WWF SmackDown! received favorable reviews according to video game review aggregator GameRankings. Daniel Erickson of NextGen was positive to the controls, graphics, and game modes such as Season and Referee mode, but criticized its "shallow" arcade-like quality and create-a-wrestler mode. In Japan, however, Famitsu gave it a score of 27 out of 40.

Lamchop of GamePro called SmackDown better than Acclaim's WWF Attitude in terms of graphics and "speedier" gameplay, but thought that Attitude has its full commentary and character voices than the former. (Note: GamePro gave the game 5/5 for graphics, 3/5 for sound, 4/5 for control, and 4.5/5 for fun factor in one review.) In another review, The D-Pad Destroyer praised the Season mode and called the title "one of the best wrestling games in the history". (Note: GamePro gave the game two 4.5/5 scores for graphics and fun factor, 3.5/5 for sound, and 4/5 for control in another review.)

The game was a bestseller in the UK upon release, and again three months later. It also received a "Platinum" sales award from the Entertainment and Leisure Software Publishers Association (ELSPA), indicating sales of at least 300,000 units in the UK. According to PC Data, WWF SmackDown! sold 980,000 units in 2000.
