= Double D Dodgeball =

2008 video game

- Developer: Yuke's
- Publisher: Yuke's
- Platform: Xbox 360
- Release: WW: 16 July 2008
- Genre: Sports
- Modes: Single-player, multiplayer

Gameplay screenshot

Double D Dodgeball is a sports video game developed and published by Yuke's for Xbox 360. The game was released on 16 July 2008.

== Reception ==
Double D Dodgeball received negative reviews from critics. On Metacritic, the game holds a score of 36/100 based on 15 reviews.
