= WWE Workout Series =

- Starring: Power Series; Triple H NXT wrestlers Fit Series; Stephanie McMahon; NXT women's wrestlers
- Production company: WWE Studios
- Distributed by: Lionsgate Home Entertainment; WWE Home Video
- Release date: December 2, 2014
- Running time: Power Series; 100 minutes Fit Series; 65 minutes
- Country: United States
- Language: English
- Budget: $100,000

WWE Workout Series is a series of fitness workouts by WWE, released on December 2, 2014 on DVD in Region 1. It was designed by Joe DeFranco and based on similar workouts he designed for Paul Levesque (better known as Triple H) and Stephanie McMahon. Unlike other WWE Home Video releases, it had nothing to do with either professional wrestling nor WWE Studios, but simply focused on physical fitness.

== Background ==
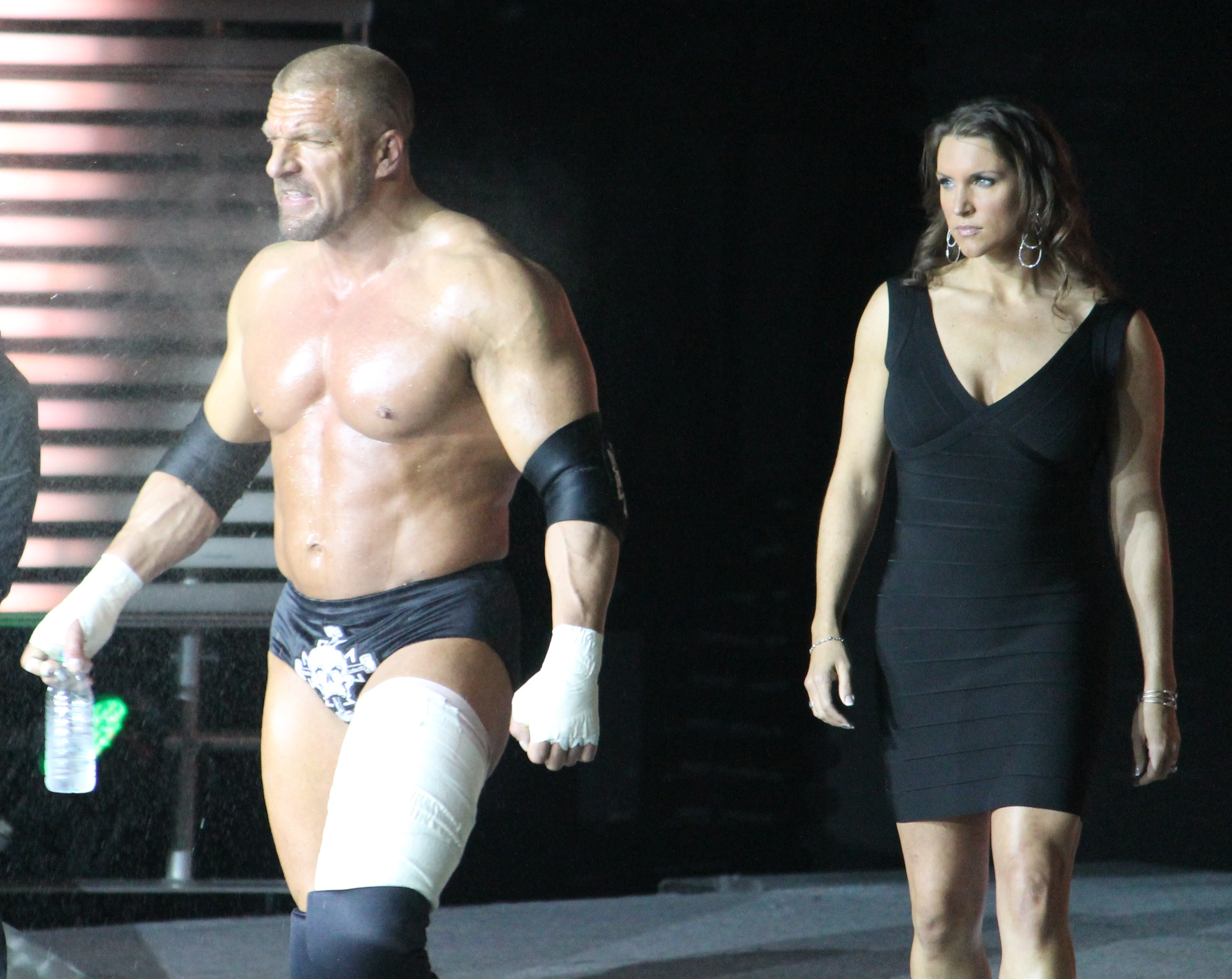
Triple H and Stephanie McMahon

Levesque serves as the trainer for the male-centric WWE Power Series while McMahon serves as the trainer for the female-centric WWE Fit Series. Both Workout Series videos take place at the WWE Performance Center in Orlando, Florida and utilize various talents from NXT.

In their respective Workout Series videos, Levesque and McMahon discuss challenges they were facing (Levesque's in-ring career winding down and McMahon going through three pregnancies) and needing to get back into shape. Both hired renowned trainer Joe DeFranco to get back into peak physical condition and decide to design similar workout plans for the general public. Aside from archival workout clips, DeFranco doesn't appear in the Workout Series videos.

Both Workout Series videos contain a warm-up video and a series of exercises, as well as a calendar for people to follow in order to get the proper fitness.

== Reception ==
The Workout Series have received mixed reviews, with most negative responses coming from wrestling fans who, despite the series having nothing to do with wrestling other than its theme as well as Levesque using his ring name Triple H in the Power Series, believe the series to be kayfabe-based and associated with the heel faction The Authority, of which Levesque and McMahon are a part of on WWE television.

More positive reviews have come from non-wrestling fans, who have stated how Levesque and McMahon both come across as good trainers and are willing to help the people watching get back into shape. Other reviews have also praised how with the exception of dumbbells, the Workout Series doesn't require the purchase of fitness equipment. Caliber Winfield of Renegade Cinema praised the series, saying it is a fantastic set for beginners, although more experienced body builders might find it lacking.
