= Go! Sports Ski =

2007 video game

- Developer(s): Yuke's (Note: Additional work by Japan Studio.)
- Publisher(s): Sony Computer Entertainment
- Platform(s): PlayStation 3
- Release: JP: September 28, 2007; NA: October 4, 2007; PAL: November 1, 2007
- Genre(s): Sports
- Mode(s): Single-player, multiplayer

Go! Sports Ski (Feel Ski in Europe) is a sports video game developed by Yuke's and published by Sony Computer Entertainment for the PlayStation 3. It was only released on PlayStation Network.

== Gameplay ==
For the controls, the game only makes use of the Sixaxis motion sensors. The player can choose between 3 practice modes and a split-screen battle offline, and 2 singleplayer leaderboards time trials and a 4 players battle mode online. These modes can be played on 2 different tracks. The game also has an achievement system in which the player can earn a maximum of 27 emblems that can be displayed in the online records.

On November 19, 2021, Sony Interactive Entertainment Japan announced that the online service for Go! Sports Ski would be terminated on December 24 2021. Offline modes will continue to be accessible.

== Reception ==
Reception

Aggregate score
Aggregator	Score
Metacritic	25/100

Review scores
Publication	Score
Eurogamer	5/10
GameSpot	4/10
IGN	2.1/10

Go! Sports Ski received "generally unfavorable reviews" according to the review aggregation website Metacritic. Austin Shau of GameSpot criticized the game for its "unreliable" Sixaxis controls and the lack of AI opponents to race against in the single-player mode. Chris Roper of IGN criticized the game's control scheme, physics model and the emblems' unlock requirements.
