= The Dog: Happy Life =

2006 video game

- Developer: Alvion
- Publisher: Yuke's
- Platform: PlayStation Portable
- Release: JP: 27 April 2006
- Genre: Life simulation
- Mode: Single-player

The Dog: Happy Life is a pet simulator for the PlayStation Portable. The video game is based on The Dog and Friends franchise by Artlist.

== Information ==
The game features realistic dogs that can be dressed up in accessories and photographed and played with in various ways. It was developed by Yuke's. The Dog: Happy Life is similar and compared to Nintendogs for the Nintendo DS. The game includes a feature that allows the player to take pictures of the virtual dog and share it on other devices like cell phones by transferring it to a PC. The game came out in April 2006 in Japan only. The format of this game is intended for a single player. The game type is considered to be a simulation, and it is strictly made for the PSP console.
