= Rumble Roses =

2004 video game

- European box art
- Developers: Konami Computer Entertainment Tokyo; Yuke's
- Publisher: Konami
- Directors: Hiromi Furuta; Mugio Awano
- Producers: Akari Uchida; Norifumi Hara
- Designers: Shiki Emiya; Hidekazu Tanaka
- Programmer: Toshiyuki Mori
- Artists: Makio Yamanaka; Shiro Kotobuki; Tatsuya Watanabe
- Composers: Akira Yamaoka; Mutsuhiko Izumi; Michiru Yamane
- Platform: PlayStation 2
- Release: NA: 9 November 2004; JP: 17 February 2005; EU: 18 February 2005
- Genres: Sports, fighting
- Modes: Single-player, multiplayer

Rumble Roses (ランブルローズ, Ranburu Rōzu) is a professional wrestling fighting game that was developed by Yuke's and published by Konami for the PlayStation 2 in 2004. The game uses the same engine as Yuke's 2003 release WWE SmackDown! Here Comes the Pain. Rumble Roses was followed by Rumble Roses XX, released for the Xbox 360 in 2006.

Rumble Roses features only female wrestling characters, each with both a good (Face) and bad (Heel) persona for players to choose from; the only limitation is that the good and bad version of the same character cannot fight each other. The game features 11 playable characters, each with two versions of the same character. It received indifferent reviews, with most commending it for the graphics, but being less impressed with the audio quality, gameplay and storyline.

== Gameplay ==
Gameplay screenshot

Rumble Roses features an all-female cast. There are regular matches and mud wrestling matches. There is also a story mode and a watch-only mode where both wrestlers are played by the AI. Each character model is claimed to contain 10,000 polygons, a record number for the PlayStation 2.

Rumble Roses features a heel/face system derived from real-life American professional wrestling. Each character has an alternate side, bringing the total character count up to 22. Most characters start as a face, or good side. Three of them, however (Bloody Shadow, Candy Cane, and Evil Rose), start as the heel or evil side. Alternate forms of each character are unlocked through the Vow System. Vows are specific goals the player must complete during matches, such as not using weapons, performing a Killer Move, or winning within a certain time limit.

The game's unique unlock system allows only one version of each character (either heel or face) to be unlocked for exhibition matches at any time. The characters can still change back and forth, and unlocked characters remain open for story mode and gallery mode. This effectively cuts the roster in half for exhibition mode.

== Plot ==
A mad scientist disguised as a nurse holds an international women's wrestling tournament, and brainwashes and takes DNA samples from the participants to create super soldiers.

== Reception ==
Reception

Aggregate scores
Aggregator	Score
GameRankings	67.06%
Metacritic	66/100

Review scores
Publication	Score
Electronic Gaming Monthly	6.83/10
Famitsu	29/40
Game Informer	7.75/10
GamePro	3.5/5
GameSpot	6.2/10
GameSpy	3.5/5
GameZone	8/10
IGN	7.8/10
Official U.S. PlayStation Magazine	3/5
X-Play	3/5

The game received "average" reviews according to video game review aggregator Metacritic.

Critics generally disliked the audio quality and plot, but praised the graphics. J.M. Vargas's review for PSX Nation said the English voices in the game are "utter and complete garbage". Jeremy Dunham reviewed the game for IGN, giving it 7.8 out of 10 overall: 9 in both Presentation and Graphics, 6.5 in Sound, 7.5 in Gameplay, and 7 in Lasting Appeal. Dunham found the storyline to be lackluster, but enjoyed the game, commenting "it's one of those rare games that manages to capitalize on the whole sex appeal thing without sacrificing the gameplay along with it." In an article for GamerFeed, Chris Buffa said that the "gorgeous women and environments will get your blood pumping" and the "corny dialogue only adds to the game's hilarity." In 2012, FHM included Benikage among the nine "sexiest ninja babes in games" and compared her to Jade Lopez.

== See also ==
- List of licensed wrestling video games
