= Rumble Roses XX =

2006 video game

- North American box art
- Developer: Yuke's
- Publisher: Konami
- Artist: Shiro Kotobuki
- Composers: Sota Fujimori; Norihiko Hibino; Michiru Yamane; Akira Yamaoka
- Platform: Xbox 360
- Release: NA: March 28, 2006; JP: March 30, 2006; EU: May 12, 2006
- Genre: Fighting
- Modes: Single-player, multiplayer

Rumble Roses XX (ランブルローズXX, Ranburu Rōzu XX) is a professional wrestling fighting game developed by Yuke's for the Xbox 360 as the sequel to the 2004 PlayStation 2 game Rumble Roses. The game was released by Konami in 2006.

== Gameplay ==
With the exception of a simple street fighting mode, the bulk of the gameplay focuses on matches which take place in various locales. Matches can be between individual wrestlers, between tag teams of two wrestlers each, or between a wrestler and a team (a more difficult handicap match).

Matches are won either through pinning an opponent or forcing the opponent to tap out with a submission move. Players can break free of these through rapid button presses, although as wrestlers suffer more damage (both overall and to specific body parts), this becomes more difficult.

The general game mechanics involve striking and grappling with foes to inflict damage upon different body parts. As successful strikes and grapples are performed, players fill a finishing move gauge which can be expended to activate special moves. Attacks can also be countered with the correct timing, resulting in humiliation for the opposing character. When humiliation builds up to a certain level, wrestlers become vulnerable to special "H-Moves", which have a high probability of inflicting a knockout. Other special moves activated via the filled gauges include "Killer Moves" and "Lethal Moves", which differ for each wrestler.

Rumble Roses XX supports online Xbox Live gameplay for up to four players, playing as a team or against each other. The online content also allowed the player to upload or download images from the game's photo shoot mode.

A wide array of character customization options are available from within the Customization Mode. These include various unlockable costumes and swimsuits, as well as adjustable sliders which can be used to increase or decrease body and muscle attributes.

The game also includes a Tag Team mode where two players can partake in a tag match. Whenever two specific wrestlers are teamed up, they will have their own special team intro, team name, tag-out sequence, Special Double X move and a special victory pose. There are only three characters in the game that don't have a team partner, Yasha, Becky and Evil Rose.

Unlike the previous game in the series, Rumble Roses XX lacks a story mode.

== Development ==
The animations for Rumble Roses XX were created with a mixture of traditional animation and motion-capture. In an interview for Kotaku at the 2005 Tokyo Game Show, producer Akari Uchida said: "For this game, we've done a lot of motion capture and rendered individual motions for every character. No two characters will be moving the same way".

Uchida also said that they wanted to develop a game for the original Xbox, but the decision was made to develop for the 360 upon learning of its superior technical abilities.

To promote the game, three of its theme songs were made available for karaoke at Joy Sound starting on April 10, 2006. Reiko Hinomoto and her alter ego Rowdy Reiko were included as guest characters in Metal Gear Solid 3: Subsistence.

== Reception ==
Reception

Aggregate score
Aggregator	Score
Metacritic	62/100

Review scores
Publication	Score
Computer Games Magazine	1/5
Electronic Gaming Monthly	5.67/10 (Note: Three critics of Electronic Gaming Monthly gave the game each a score of 7/10, 6.5/10, and 3.5/10.)
Eurogamer	5/10
Famitsu	32/40
Game Informer	5.75/10
GameRevolution	C
GameSpot	6.6/10
GameSpy	2.5/5
GameTrailers	6.9/10
GameZone	6.7/10
Hardcore Gamer	2.75/5
IGN	6.5/10
Official Xbox Magazine (US)	7/10
X-Play	3/5
411Mania	7.3/10

Rumble Roses XX received "mixed" reviews according to video game review aggregator Metacritic. In Japan, Famitsu gave it a score of one nine, two eights, and one seven for a total of 32 out of 40. GamePro said of the game, "This isn't the deepest videogaming experience you can buy for sixty bucks. It's not going to change the genre. It's not going to be the game of the year. It's just something fun to do after killing a few beers." (Note: GamePro gave the game two 4/5 scores for graphics and fun factor, and two 3/5 scores for sound and control.) Edge gave the game six out of ten, saying, "Feisty and unapologetic, it's a game that's happy to break the resolve of those who fail to accept its rules: play casual and compete at leisure."

Although the game was generally unpopular in North America, it was relatively well received in Japan and rereleased in a Platinum Collection edition. It was the fifth best selling Xbox 360 title in Japan from the console's launch in December 2005 to June 2006. By December 2007, the game had dropped to 18th place in Japanese sales.

The character Reiko Hinomoto came in fourth place in a poll that asked 1,500 Japanese gamers to name their favorite Xbox 360 heroine.

== Future ==
In 2006, a pachislot game inspired by the original Rumble Roses game was released. In 2008, a machine based on Rumble Roses XX was released, with a third original machine entitled Rumble Roses 3D being released in 2012.

Konami Mobile developed and released Java spin-off, Rumble Roses: Sexy Pinball, for mobile devices in the United States in September 2006.

In 2018, Rumble Roses XX was made available on Xbox One and via backwards compatibility. It's also playable on the Xbox Series X and Series S upon release in 2020.

== See also ==
- List of licensed wrestling video games
