= Yuke's =

Japanese video game developer

Yuke's Co. Ltd.
- Type: Kabushiki gaisha
- Industry: Video games
- Founded: February 26, 1993; 33 years ago
- Founder: Yukinori Taniguchi
- Headquarters: Osaka, Japan
- Products: WWE 2K series (2000–2018)
- Number of employees: 333 (January 2026)
- Subsidiaries: Fine Co., Ltd.
- Website: yukes.co.jp/en

Yuke's Co. Ltd. is a Japanese video game developer based in Osaka. It was established on February 26, 1993, by Yukinori Taniguchi. The company is best known for developing the WWE video game series, based on the professional wrestling promotion of the same name, until 2018.

== History ==
Founded in 1993, Yuke's was named after founder Yukinori Taniguchi's high school nickname. The first two games that the company developed were the platform game Hermie Hopperhead and the pro wrestling game Toukon Retsuden. The latter title was a best-seller in Japan. Though Activision purchased the rights to publish the game in North America and began localization work, only the first game was localized, becoming Power Move Pro Wrestling with a different roster of wrestlers. In November 1999, Yuke's established Fine Co., Ltd. as a wholly owned subsidiary focused on online systems and mobile game development.

Beginning in 2000, Yuke's began to develop wrestling games for THQ and Jakks Pacific based on the World Wrestling Federation (WWF; now WWE). They were recommended to THQ by Aki, who had developed their own line of wrestling games. From 2005 to 2012, Yuke's owned 54% of New Japan Pro-Wrestling, the top professional wrestling promotion in Japan.

In August 2019, then-series publisher 2K Games announced it had moved WWE game development to California-based studio Visual Concepts. Earlier that year, Yuke's had revealed its frustration over what it had been able to achieve with recent WWE 2K games and suggested that its relationship with publisher 2K Sports was partly responsible. Producer Hiromi Furuta revealed that Yuke's had established a new development team tasked with creating a rival wrestling IP, with the intention of reinvigorating its staff. On November 10, 2020, All Elite Wrestling (AEW) announced an upcoming console game developed by Yuke's, led by Def Jam Vendetta and WWF No Mercy director, Hideyuki "Geta" Iwashita; this game would later go on to become AEW Fight Forever. Yuke's acquired Aquaplus from Pole to Win in August 2025.

=== Exciting Pro Wrestling controversy ===
Instead of THQ and Jakks Pacific, Yuke's published seven WWF/WWE games in Japan, starting with WWF SmackDown! in 2000 and finishing with WWE SmackDown! vs. Raw 2006 in 2005. These games were renamed to "Exciting Pro Wrestling 0-7" and released for PlayStation consoles. On October 18, 2006, WWE sued THQ and Jakks Pacific over alleged improper sales of WWE video games in Japan, and other countries in Asia, concerning that both parties were sub-licensing publication rights to Yuke's, which they were not allowed to do. As a result of this, THQ formed a new division in Japan, and WWE SmackDown vs. Raw 2007 was released in Japan in 2006 directly by THQ and Jakks Pacific, instead of Yuke's. This satisfied WWE, and the lawsuit was thrown out.

== Games developed ==
These are the list of games that the company developed.

| Year | Title | Publisher(s) | Platform(s) |
|---|---|---|---|
| 1995 | New Japan Pro-Wrestling: Toukon Retsuden | Tomy | PlayStation |
| 1995 | Hermie Hopperhead: Scrap Panic | SCEI | PlayStation |
| 1996 | New Japan Pro-Wrestling: Toukon Retsuden 2 | Tomy | PlayStation |
| 1997 | Ucchannanchan no Honō no Challenger: Denryū Iraira Bō | Hudson Soft | Nintendo 64 |
| 1998 | New Japan Pro-Wrestling: Toukon Road Brave Spirits | Hudson Soft | Nintendo 64 |
| 1998 | New Japan Pro-Wrestling: Toukon Retsuden 3 | Tomy | PlayStation |
| 1998 | Soukaigi | SquareSoft | PlayStation |
| 1998 | New Japan Pro-Wrestling: Toukon Road 2 - The Next Generation | Hudson Soft | Nintendo 64 |
| 1999 | Evil Zone | Titus Software | PlayStation |
| 1999 | Last Legion UX | Hudson Soft | Nintendo 64 |
| 1999 | New Japan Pro-Wrestling: Toukon Retsuden 4 | Tomy | Dreamcast |
| 1999 | The Pro Wrestling | D3 Publisher | PlayStation |
| 1999 | Sword of the Berserk: Guts' Rage | ASCII Corporation | Dreamcast |
| 2000 | WWF SmackDown! | THQ | PlayStation |
| 2000 | WWF Royal Rumble | THQ | Arcade, Dreamcast |
| 2000 | WWF SmackDown! 2: Know Your Role | THQ | PlayStation |
| 2000 | The Pro Wrestling 2 | D3 Publisher | PlayStation |
| 2001 | WWF SmackDown! Just Bring It | THQ | PlayStation 2 |
| 2002 | EOE: Eve of Extinction | Eidos Interactive | PlayStation 2 |
| 2002 | Edit Racing | D3 Publisher | PlayStation 2 |
| 2002 | WWE WrestleMania X8 | THQ | GameCube |
| 2002 | WWE SmackDown! Shut Your Mouth | THQ | PlayStation 2 |
| 2003 | WWE WrestleMania XIX | THQ | GameCube |
| 2003 | WWE SmackDown! Here Comes the Pain | THQ | PlayStation 2 |
| 2004 | Online Pro Wrestling | Yuke's | PlayStation 2 |
| 2004 | WWE Day of Reckoning | THQ | GameCube |
| 2004 | Berserk: Millennium Falcon Hen Seima Senki no Shō | Sammy Corporation | PlayStation 2 |
| 2004 | WWE SmackDown! vs. Raw | THQ | PlayStation 2 |
| 2004 | Rumble Roses | Konami | PlayStation 2 |
| 2005 | D1 Grand Prix | Yuke's | PlayStation 2 |
| 2005 | WWE Day of Reckoning 2 | THQ | GameCube |
| 2005 | D1 Grand Prix 2005 | Yuke's | PlayStation 2 |
| 2005 | WWE SmackDown! vs. Raw 2006 | THQ | PlayStation 2, PlayStation Portable |
| 2005 | Wrestle Kingdom | Yuke's | PlayStation 2, Xbox 360 |
| 2006 | The Dog: Happy Life | Yuke's | PlayStation Portable |
| 2006 | Rumble Roses XX | Konami | Xbox 360 |
| 2006 | WWE SmackDown vs. Raw 2007 | THQ | PlayStation 2, PlayStation Portable, Xbox 360 |
| 2007 | The Dog Island | Ubisoft | PlayStation 2, Wii |
| 2007 | Wrestle Kingdom 2 | Yuke's | PlayStation 2 |
| 2007 | Go! Sports Ski | SCEI | PlayStation 3 |
| 2007 | Neves | Atlus | Nintendo DS |
| 2007 | WWE SmackDown vs. Raw 2008 | THQ | PlayStation 2, PlayStation 3, PlayStation Portable, Wii, Xbox 360 |
| 2007 | Petz: Dogz 2 and Catz 2 | Ubisoft | PlayStation 2, Wii |
| 2007 | Soukou Kihei Votoms | Bandai Namco Entertainment | PlayStation 2 |
| 2008 | Double D Dodgeball | Yuke's | Xbox 360 |
| 2008 | Mobile Suit Gundam 00: Gundam Meisters | Bandai Namco Entertainment | PlayStation 2 |
| 2008 | Neverland Card Battles | Idea Factory | PlayStation Portable |
| 2008 | WWE SmackDown vs. Raw 2009 | THQ | PlayStation 2, PlayStation 3, PlayStation Portable, Wii, Xbox 360 |
| 2009 | WWE Legends of WrestleMania | THQ | PlayStation 3, Xbox 360, iOS |
| 2009 | UFC 2009 Undisputed | THQ | PlayStation 3, Xbox 360 |
| 2009 | WWE SmackDown vs. Raw 2010 | THQ | Nintendo DS, PlayStation 2, PlayStation 3, PlayStation Portable, Wii, Xbox 360 |
| 2010 | UFC Undisputed 2010 | THQ | PlayStation 3, PlayStation Portable, Xbox 360 |
| 2010 | WWE SmackDown vs. Raw 2011 | THQ | PlayStation 2, PlayStation 3, PlayStation Portable, Wii, Xbox 360 |
| 2011 | Real Steel | Yuke's | PlayStation 3, Xbox 360 |
| 2011 | WWE '12 | THQ | PlayStation 3, Wii, Xbox 360 |
| 2012 | UFC Undisputed 3 | THQ | PlayStation 3, Xbox 360 |
| 2012 | WWE '13 | THQ | PlayStation 3, Wii, Xbox 360 |
| 2013 | Pacific Rim | Yuke's | Xbox 360, PlayStation 3 |
| 2013 | WWE 2K14 | 2K | PlayStation 3, Xbox 360 |
| 2014 | WWE 2K15 | 2K | Microsoft Windows, PlayStation 3, PlayStation 4, Xbox 360, Xbox One |
| 2015 | WWE 2K16 | 2K | Microsoft Windows, PlayStation 3, PlayStation 4, Xbox 360, Xbox One |
| 2016 | WWE 2K17 | 2K | Microsoft Windows, PlayStation 3, PlayStation 4, Xbox 360, Xbox One |
| 2017 | WWE 2K18 | 2K | Microsoft Windows, Nintendo Switch, PlayStation 4, Xbox One |
| 2018 | WWE 2K19 | 2K | Microsoft Windows, PlayStation 4, Xbox One |
| 2019 | Earth Defense Force: Iron Rain | D3 Publisher | Microsoft Windows, PlayStation 4 |
| 2020 | Earth Defense Force: World Brothers | D3 Publisher | Microsoft Windows, Nintendo Switch, PlayStation 4 |
| 2023 | AEW Fight Forever | THQ Nordic | Nintendo Switch, Microsoft Windows, PlayStation 4, PlayStation 5, Xbox One, Xbox Series X/S |
| 2024 | Earth Defense Force: World Brothers 2 | D3 Publisher | Nintendo Switch, PlayStation 4, PlayStation 5 |
| 2025 | Double Dragon Revive | Arc System Works | Microsoft Windows, PlayStation 4, PlayStation 5, Xbox One, Xbox Series X/S |
| 2025 | Full Metal Schoolgirl | D3 Publisher | Microsoft Windows, Nintendo Switch 2, PlayStation 5 |
