= Power Move Pro Wrestling =

1995 video game

- North American cover art
- Developer: Yuke's
- Publishers: JP: Tomy; NA/EU: Activision
- Producer: Larry Galka
- Designer: Mark Volpe
- Artist: Derek Friesenborg
- Writer: Lorraine Suzuki
- Composer: Jason Slater
- Platform: PlayStation
- Release: JP: 29 September 1995; NA: 14 November 1996; EU: 20 December 1996
- Genres: Fighting, sports
- Modes: Single-player, multiplayer

Power Move Pro Wrestling (NJPW 闘魂列伝 "Toukon Retsuden" or "Fighting Spirit Legend" in Japan) is a video game developed by Yuke's Co., Ltd. and published by Tomy for the PlayStation.

== Gameplay ==
Power Move Pro Wrestling is a professional wrestling game featuring 12 wrestlers. The original Japanese version of the game was originally a New Japan Pro-Wrestling licensed video game; due to the limited popularity of the promotion outside the country, an original roster of wrestlers was created for Power Move Pro Wrestling while retaining NJPW wrestler move sets.

== Reception ==
Reception

Review score
Publication	Score
Dengeki PlayStation	80/100, 90/100, 80/100, 95/100

Next Generation reviewed the PlayStation version of the game, rating it four stars out of five, and wrote that "if there was a game that screamed for a WWF license and a US release, this is the one". The same magazine again reviewed the game and gave it three stars out of five, and wrote that "overall, the impact is somewhat less than what we'd hoped for from a U.S. port, but Power Move Wrestling is still a solid game and an enjoyable distraction".

== Reviews ==
- GamePro (Jan, 1997)
- GameSpot - Dec 01, 1996
- Game Revolution - Jan, 1997
- NowGamer - Dec 20, 1996

== See also ==
- List of licensed wrestling video games
- List of fighting games
