= Dwayne Johnson filmography =

Performances by American actor

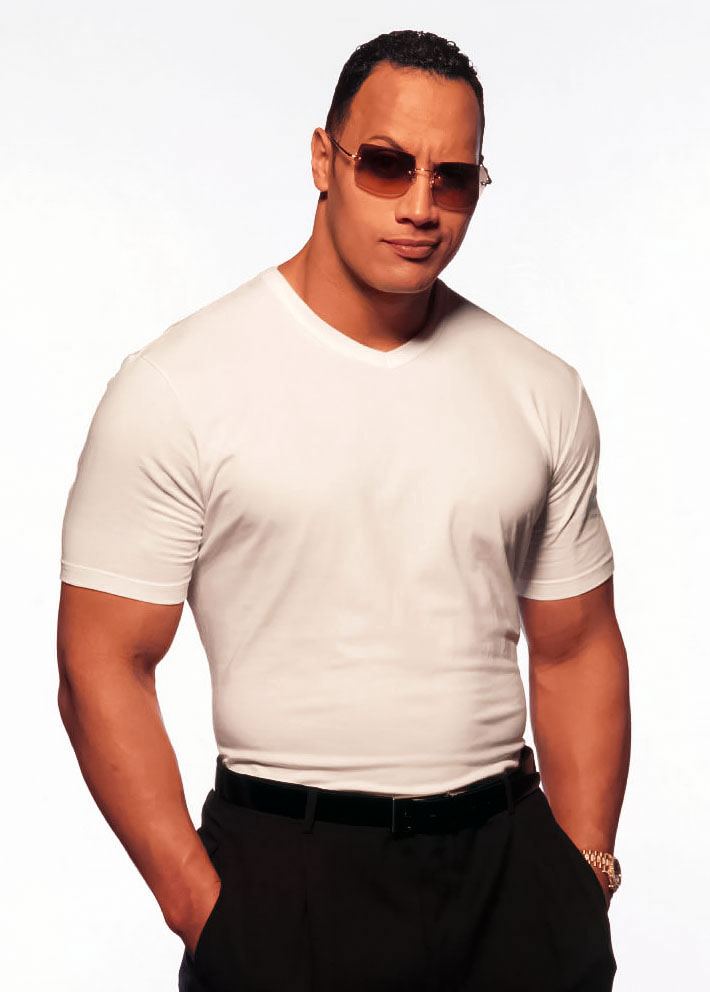
Johnson in 2001

American actor and professional wrestler Dwayne Johnson, also known by his ring name The Rock, is one of the highest-paid and highest-grossing actors of all time. His films have grossed over $3.5 billion in North America and over $12.5 billion worldwide.

Johnson had his first acting role in 1999, when he appeared on the popular sitcom That '70s Show, portraying his real-life father, Rocky Johnson, in the episode titled "That Wrestling Show". He made his first film appearance in The Mummy Returns (2001) and reprised his role from that film for his first leading role in the spin-off The Scorpion King (2002). He has since starred in numerous other successful films, including The Rundown (2003), Walking Tall (2004), Doom (2005), Southland Tales (2007), The Game Plan (2007), Get Smart (2008), Race to Witch Mountain (2009), Tooth Fairy (2010), You Again (2010), Journey 2: The Mysterious Island (2012), G.I. Joe: Retaliation (2013), Pain & Gain (2013), Hercules (2014), San Andreas (2015), Central Intelligence (2016), Moana (2016), Rampage (2018), Skyscraper (2018), and Jungle Cruise (2021).

Johnson's most commercially successful role is as Luke Hobbs in the Fast & Furious franchise; he first appeared as the character in Fast Five (2011) and is credited with breathing new life into the franchise, catapulting it into one of the highest-grossing movie franchises in history. He starred in the sequels Fast & Furious 6 (2013), Furious 7 (2015), and The Fate of the Furious (2017), as well as his own spin-off film Hobbs & Shaw (2019) and a cameo in Fast X (2023). Another notable franchise starring Johnson is Jumanji, with the films Jumanji: Welcome to the Jungle (2017) and Jumanji: The Next Level (2019). He also provided the voice of Maui in the Disney animated films Moana (2016) and Moana 2 (2024), as well as portraying Maui in the live-action Moana (2026).

Johnson has also ventured into television, starring in the HBO series Ballers (2015–2019), which ended its first season as HBO's most-watched comedy in six years.

The filmography does not include his professional wrestling appearances in any form of media.

== Film ==
Year	Title	Role	Notes	Ref.
2001	The Mummy Returns	Mathayus / The Scorpion King		
2001	Longshot	Mugger	Cameo	
2002	The Scorpion King	Mathayus / The Scorpion King	First lead role	
2003	The Rundown	Beck		
2004	Walking Tall	Chris Vaughn, Jr.		
2005	Be Cool	Elliot Wilhelm		
2005	Doom	Sgt. Asher "Sarge" Mahonin	Credited as The Rock	
2006	Southland Tales	Boxer Santaros / Jericho Cane		
2006	Gridiron Gang	Sean Porter		
2007	The Game Plan	Joe		
2007	Reno 911!: Miami	Agent Rick "The Condor" Smith	Uncredited cameo	
2008	Get Smart	Agent 23		
2009	Race to Witch Mountain	Jack Bruno		
2009	Planet 51	Charles T. Baker	Voice role	
2010	Tooth Fairy	Derek Thompson		
2010	Why Did I Get Married Too?	Daniel Franklin	Uncredited cameo	
2010	The Other Guys	Det. Christopher Danson		
2010	You Again	Air Marshal	Cameo	
2010	Faster	James "Jimmy" Cullen / Driver		
2011	Fast Five	Lucas "Luke" Hobbs		
2012	Journey 2: The Mysterious Island	Hank Parsons		
2013	Snitch	John Matthews	Also producer	
2013	G.I. Joe: Retaliation	Marvin F. Hinton / Roadblock		
2013	Pain & Gain	Paul Doyle		
2013	Fast & Furious 6	Lucas "Luke" Hobbs		
2013	Empire State	Det. James Ransome	Direct-to-video film	
2014	Hercules	Hercules		
2014	Lennon or McCartney	Himself	Documentary	
2015	Furious 7	Lucas "Luke" Hobbs		
2015	San Andreas	Raymond "Ray" Gaines		
2016	Central Intelligence	Robbie Weirdicht / Bob Stone		
2016	Moana	Maui	Voice role	
2017	The Fate of the Furious	Lucas "Luke" Hobbs		
2017	Baywatch	Lt. Mitch Buchannon	Also executive producer	
2017	Rock and a Hard Place	Himself	Also executive producer; documentary	
2017	Jumanji: Welcome to the Jungle	Dr. Xander "Smolder" Bravestone	Also executive producer	
2018	Rampage	Davis Okoye	Also executive producer	
2018	Skyscraper	Will Sawyer	Also producer	
2019	Fighting with My Family	Himself	Cameo; also producer	
2019	Shazam!	Black Adam	Likeness cameo; also executive producer	
2019	Fast & Furious Presents: Hobbs & Shaw	Lucas "Luke" Hobbs	Also producer	
2019	Jumanji: The Next Level	Dr. Xander "Smolder" Bravestone and Johnathan Bravestone	Also producer	
2021	Jungle Cruise	Francisco Lopez de Heredia / Frank Wolff	Also producer	
2021	Free Guy	Bank Robber #2	Voice cameo	
2021	Red Notice	John Hartley	Also producer	
2022	DC League of Super-Pets	Krypto, Anubis and Black Adam	Voice role; also producer	
2022	Black Adam	Teth-Adam / Black Adam	Also producer	
2023	Fast X	Lucas "Luke" Hobbs	Uncredited cameo; mid-credits scene	
2023	Once Upon a Studio	Maui	Voice role; short film	
2024	Red One	Callum "Cal" Drift	Also producer	
2024	Moana 2	Maui	Voice role; also executive producer; contributed to the film's soundtrack	
2025	The Smashing Machine	Mark Kerr	Also producer	
2025	Zootopia 2	Zeke	Voice cameo	
2026	Moana	Maui	Also producer; contributed to the film's soundtrack	
2026	Jumanji: Open World †	Dr. Xander "Smolder" Bravestone	Post-production; also producer	
2027	Lizard Music †	Chicken Man	Post-production; also producer	

Key
†	Denotes films that have not yet been released

== Television ==
Year	Title	Role	Notes	Ref.
1999	That '70s Show	Rocky Johnson	Episode: "That Wrestling Show"	
1999	The Net	Brody	Episode: "Last Man Standing"	
2000	Star Trek: Voyager	The Champion	Episode: "Tsunkatse"	
2000–2017	Saturday Night Live	Himself	Host; 5 episodes	
2007	Cory in the House	Himself	Episode: "Never the Dwayne Shall Meet"	
2007	Hannah Montana	Himself	Episode: "Don't Stop Til You Get the Phone"	
2009	Wizards of Waverly Place	Himself	Episode: "Art Teacher"	
2009	2009 Kids' Choice Awards	Himself	Host; TV special	
2010	Family Guy	Himself	Episode: "Big Man on Hippocampus"	
2010	Transformers: Prime	Cliffjumper	Voice role; episode: "Darkness Rising, Part 1"	
2013	The Hero	Himself	Host; also executive producer	
2014–2015	Wake Up Call	Himself	Host; also creator and executive producer	
2015	Lip Sync Battle	Himself	Episode: "Dwayne Johnson vs. Jimmy Fallon"	
2015–2019	Ballers	Spencer Strasmore	47 episodes; also executive producer	
2016	2016 MTV Movie Awards	Himself	Co-host; TV special	
2017	Lifeline	Himself	Episode: "In 33 Days You’ll Die"; also executive producer	
2019–2020	The Titan Games	Himself	Host; also creator and executive producer	
2021	Behind the Attraction	Himself	Episode: "Jungle Cruise"; also executive producer	
2021–2023	Young Rock	Himself	Narrator; also creator and executive producer	

== Video games ==
=== WWE video games ===
Year	Title	Cover Athlete	Notes
1998	WWF War Zone	No	
1999	WWF Attitude	Yes	
1999	WWF WrestleMania 2000	Yes	
2000	WWF SmackDown!	Yes	
2000	WWF Royal Rumble	Yes	
2000	WWF No Mercy	Yes	
2000	WWF SmackDown! 2: Know Your Role	Yes	
2001	WWF With Authority!	Yes	
2001	WWF Betrayal	Yes	
2001	WWF Road to WrestleMania	Yes	
2001	WWF SmackDown! Just Bring It	Yes	
2002	WWF Raw	Yes	
2002	WWE WrestleMania X8	Yes	
2002	WWE Road to WrestleMania X8	No	
2002	WWE SmackDown! Shut Your Mouth	No	
2003	WWE Crush Hour	Yes	
2003	WWE WrestleMania XIX	Yes	
2003	WWE Raw 2	No	
2003	WWE SmackDown! Here Comes the Pain	Yes	
2004	WWE Day of Reckoning	No	
2004	WWE SmackDown! vs. Raw	No	
2005	WWE Day of Reckoning 2	No	
2005	WWE SmackDown! vs. Raw 2006	No	
2006	WWE SmackDown! vs. Raw 2007	No	
2007	WWE SmackDown! vs. Raw 2008	No	
2009	WWE SmackDown vs. Raw 2010	No	
2009	WWE Legends of WrestleMania	Yes	
2010	WWE SmackDown vs. Raw 2011	Yes	
2011	WWE All Stars	Yes	
2011	WWE '12	No	
2012	WWE '13	No	
2013	WWE 2K14	Yes	
2014	WWE 2K15	No	
2015	WWE Immortals	Yes	
2015	WWE 2K16	No	
2016	WWE 2K17	No	
2017	WWE 2K18	No	
2018	WWE 2K19	No	
2019	WWE 2K20	No	
2020	WWE 2K Battlegrounds	Yes	
2022	WWE 2K22	No	
2023	WWE 2K23	No	
2024	WWE 2K24	No	
2025	WWE 2K25	No	
2026	WWE 2K26	Yes	

=== Other video games ===
Year	Title	Voice role	Notes	Ref.
2002	The Scorpion King: Rise of the Akkadian	Mathayus (Scorpion King)		
2006	SpyHunter: Nowhere to Run	Alex Decker	Also motion capture	
2021–present	Fortnite Battle Royale	The Foundation, Teth-Adam / Black Adam	Also likeness	

== Music videos ==
Year	Title	Artist(s)	Role	Notes	Ref.
2000	"Know Your Role"	Method Man	Himself		
2000	"It Doesn't Matter"	Wyclef Jean	Himself		
2011	"Dwayne "The Rock" Johnson WWE Entrance Video"	Jim Johnston	Himself		
2016	"You're Welcome (From "Moana")"	Himself	Maui		
2017	"Jumanji, Jumanji"		Nick Jonas and Jack Black		
2020	"The Man"	Taylor Swift	Tyler Swift	Voice; cameo	
2021	"Face Off"	Tech N9ne, Joey Cool, King Iso, and himself	Himself		
