= WWE SmackDown (disambiguation) =

WWE SmackDown is a professional wrestling television program.

== Championships ==
- WWE Women's Championship
- WWE Tag Team Championship
- WWE SmackDown Championship also known as the WWE Championship

== Video games ==
- WWF SmackDown! (video game)
- WWF SmackDown! 2: Know Your Role
- WWF SmackDown! Just Bring It
- WWE SmackDown! Shut Your Mouth
- WWE SmackDown! Here Comes the Pain
- WWE SmackDown! vs. Raw
- WWE SmackDown! vs. Raw 2006
- WWE SmackDown vs. Raw 2007
- WWE SmackDown vs. Raw 2008
- WWE SmackDown vs. Raw 2009
- WWE SmackDown vs. Raw 2010
- WWE SmackDown vs. Raw 2011
- WWE SmackDown vs. Raw Online

== Other ==
- SmackDown (WWE brand) a brand within the WWE
- WWE SmackDown roster the roster of those within the SmackDown brand
  - List of WWE SmackDown on-air personalities
  - List of WWE SmackDown guest stars
- History of WWE SmackDown
