= WWE Raw (disambiguation) =

WWE Raw is a professional wrestling television program. WWE Raw or WWF Raw may also refer to:

== Championships ==
- WWE Raw Women's Championship
- WWE Raw Tag Team Championship
- WWE Raw Championship also known as the WWE Universal Championship

== Television ==
- List of WWE Raw special episodes
  - WWE Raw 25 Years
  - WWE Raw 1000
- WWE Raw Diva Search

== Video games ==
- WWF Raw (1994 video game)
- WWE Raw 2
- WWF Raw (2002 video game)
- WWE SmackDown! vs. Raw
- WWE SmackDown! vs. Raw 2006
- WWE SmackDown vs. Raw 2007
- WWE SmackDown vs. Raw 2008
- WWE SmackDown vs. Raw 2009
- WWE SmackDown vs. Raw 2010
- WWE SmackDown vs. Raw 2011
- WWE SmackDown vs. Raw Online

== Other ==
- Raw (WWE brand) a brand within the WWE
- WWE Raw roster the roster of those within the Raw brand
  - List of WWE Raw guest stars
- History of WWE Raw
