= WWE 2K (video game) =

2015 professional wrestling video game

- Android app icon featuring John Cena, as shown in the cover of WWE 2K15
- Developers: Visual Concepts n-space
- Publisher: 2K
- Series: WWE 2K
- Platforms: Android, iOS
- Release: WW: April 16, 2015
- Genres: Fighting, Sports

WWE 2K is a professional wrestling video game developed by Visual Concepts and n-Space for iOS and Android on April 16, 2015. It is the first and only mobile video game to be published under the WWE 2K brand. It was based on its console counterpart, WWE 2K15, which was released six months prior.

== Gameplay ==
WWE 2K was a simulation-style wrestling game which featured a tutorial mode, career mode, superstar creation suite, unlockable rewards, and the ability to play live multiplayer matches. It featured a limited roster of Raw and SmackDown superstars, as well as WWE Legends, notably Hulk Hogan, Sting, Triple H, The Undertaker and John Cena. There were only three different match types (singles, steel cage, and no disqualification), and four arenas (Raw, SmackDown, Main Event, and Superstars). Three months later, in June 2015, an update was rolled out in order to improve both the in-game controls and responsiveness.

== Reception ==
Nick Tylwalk of Gamezebo rated the game 3.5/5 stars and he praised the controls, the multiplayer feature and stated there is "plenty of WWE authenticity in graphics and audio", but the negatives of the game are the fact it 'leaves you wanting more' and the game is slow and imprecise in the gameplay. Bryan Vore of Game Informer criticised the game's in-ring combat options, limited match types, career mode and stated that "WWE 2K is a bare-bones, yet mechanically functional mobile title".
