= WWE 2K =

Video game series

- Genre: Sports (professional wrestling)
- Developers: Yuke's (2000–2018); Visual Concepts (2019–present); Shiver Entertainment (2025–present via Nintendo Switch 2 version)
- Publishers: THQ (2000–2012); 2K (2013–present)
- Platforms: Android iOS; Microsoft Windows; Mobile; PlayStation; PlayStation 2 PlayStation 3 PlayStation 4 PlayStation 5 PlayStation Portable; Stadia; Wii; Nintendo DS; Nintendo Switch; Nintendo Switch 2 Xbox 360; Xbox One; Xbox Series X/S
- First release: WWF SmackDown! March 2, 2000
- Latest release: WWE 2K26; March 13, 2026
- Parent series: List of WWE video games

WWE 2K, formerly released as WWF SmackDown!, WWE SmackDown!, WWE SmackDown! vs. Raw, WWE SmackDown vs. Raw, WWE, and Exciting Pro Wrestling in Japan, is a series of professional wrestling sports simulation video games that launched in 2000. The premise of the series is to emulate professional wrestling, specifically that of WWE, formerly known as the World Wrestling Federation (WWF). The series began with WWF SmackDown! on the original PlayStation and has continued as an annual release (with the exception of 2021). It was originally exclusive to PlayStation platforms until 2006's WWE SmackDown vs. Raw 2007, which expanded the series to other platforms. In 2013, the series was rebranded as WWE 2K, beginning with WWE 2K14.

The games were originally published by THQ and developed by Yuke's under the WWF SmackDown! name—in 2002, the WWF was renamed to WWE. Beginning with WWE SmackDown! vs. Raw in 2004, the series changed its name to WWE SmackDown vs. Raw and then simply WWE with 2011's WWE '12. 2K, previously under the 2K Sports sub-label, took over as publisher following THQ's bankruptcy beginning with 2013's WWE 2K14, changing the series to WWE 2K, and the series was co-developed with Visual Concepts until Yuke's departure in 2018. Visual Concepts would take over lead development of the series beginning with WWE 2K20 in 2019. Due to major technical issues with that installment, the main series took a two-year hiatus with a spin-off, WWE 2K Battlegrounds, released in 2020 before the next main installment, WWE 2K22, released in 2022.

== History and development ==
Release timeline THQ-published games in light green 2K-published games in dark green
2000	WWF SmackDown!
2000	WWF SmackDown! 2: Know Your Role
2001	WWF SmackDown! Just Bring It
2002	WWE SmackDown! Shut Your Mouth
2003	WWE SmackDown! Here Comes the Pain
2004	WWE SmackDown! vs. Raw
2005	WWE SmackDown! vs. Raw 2006
2006	WWE SmackDown vs. Raw 2007
2007	WWE SmackDown vs. Raw 2008
2008	WWE SmackDown vs. Raw 2009
2009	WWE SmackDown vs. Raw 2010
2010	WWE SmackDown vs. Raw 2011
2011	WWE '12
2012	WWE '13
2013	WWE 2K14
2014	WWE 2K15
2015	WWE 2K; WWE 2K16
2016	WWE 2K17
2017	WWE 2K18
2018	WWE 2K19
2019	WWE 2K20
2020	WWE 2K Battlegrounds
2021
2022	WWE 2K22
2023	WWE 2K23
2024	WWE 2K24
2025	WWE 2K25
2026	WWE 2K26

The first game, WWF SmackDown!, was developed by Yuke's, published by THQ, and released on March 2, 2000; this arrangement would continue until 2012. The series was originally named after one of WWE's weekly television programs, SmackDown, and was initially exclusive to Sony's PlayStation 1 and PlayStation 2. The series engine was originally based on the one used by the Japanese Toukon Retsuden, which was also developed by Yuke's.

The series rebranded with 2004's WWE SmackDown! vs. Raw, following the introduction of the brand extension, which saw WWE's roster divided between the SmackDown and Raw brands; the latter named after WWE's two flagship programs, Monday Night Raw and Friday Night SmackDown. After using subtitles in previous installments, voice overs were introduced to the game's "Season Mode". With the exception of 2003's WWE SmackDown! Here Comes the Pain, pre-recorded commentary by WWE commentators has been included in each game since the release of WWF SmackDown! Just Bring It in 2001.

Yuke's studios in Yokohama, Japan, worked with WWE writers to create storylines for the "Season" modes of each game since 2005's WWE SmackDown! vs. Raw 2006. Up until the release of SmackDown! vs. Raw 2006, Yuke's had released previous entries of the series in Japan under the title of Exciting Pro Wrestling. That year, THQ took over as the Japanese publisher and rebranded the Exciting Pro Wrestling series under the licensed name.

2006's WWE SmackDown vs. Raw 2007 was the first game in the series to be released for multiple game consoles. The series continued to expand to various seventh-generation consoles, handhelds, and mobile devices. Yuke's revealed they had to port their original game codes that make up each game mode and graphic designs to a new game engine that supported the new consoles. When new features are added to future games, the developers had to create new gaming codes for these features. The developers also had to test the game for any errors. While there were no errors, the game received a lot of reports for overheating in the earlier releases.

The series relaunched in 2011 with the release of WWE '12; however, after THQ's bankruptcy, liquidation, and eventual dissolution in January 2013, publishing rights for the WWE video games were acquired by Take-Two Interactive. Take-Two confirmed the acquisition in February, saying that it would also retain the services of Yuke's and the THQ staff that worked on the WWE series. 2013's WWE 2K14 was the first game to be released under the 2K Sports branding. In 2015, a mobile-only spin-off was released for Android and iOS. 2K's license of the series extended in early 2016. 2018's WWE 2K19 was the last game in the series to be developed by Yuke's.

2019's WWE 2K20 was the first game in the series to be developed solely by Visual Concepts, who had worked with Yuke's on previous games under the WWE 2K banner. The game received generally negative reviews for various changes seen as a regression from 2K19, and for numerous bugs and technical issues upon its launch. The series went on a two-year hiatus in response, with WWE 2K Battlegrounds released in 2020 as a replacement for a previously planned WWE 2K21 game. WWE 2K22, the twenty-second installment of the series, was released in March 2022 to a generally more favourable reception than its predecessor. WWE 2K23, the twenty-third installment of the series, was released in March 2023 surpassing the expectations preceded by 2K22.

== Gameplay ==
The first game in the series, WWF SmackDown!, had a clear cut system for moves such as combining an arrow key with the circle button for grappling and moves and combining an arrow key with the X button for striking moves. Most of the later games, from WWF SmackDown! 2: Know Your Role to WWE SmackDown vs. Raw 2006 used the aforementioned control scheme. With WWE SmackDown vs Raw 2007 new game mechanics were introduced, in which a new control scheme altered the grappling system of the game, called "Ultimate Control moves". Unlike the previous games, where the player pressed two buttons to perform a grapple or an attack, players were able to place their opponents into a grapple position and then choose to perform a move by moving the directional buttons of their system's controller. For example, the player could place their opponent in a suplex grappling position and then either perform a normal suplex or an inverted suplex slam.

Before the release of WWE SmackDown vs. Raw 2008, in order for players to force a character to submit, they had to tap buttons to move a marker towards the end of the meter labeled "Submit", and the only way for opponents to escape was for them to move the meter towards "Escape". Included with the release of WWE SmackDown vs. Raw 2008 was a new submission system, in which the player had to move the analog sticks of their system's controller in different directions to force the opponent to submit, while the opponent could do the same to escape the submission hold.

Every game in the SmackDown vs. Raw series used to have the amount of damage inflicted to the player's chosen character, measured with a meter on the HUD, where a design of a male figure presented the damage. As a move was performed against a character, the affected area of the body flashed—the more damage that is done to that specific body part, the more likely it is for the character to submit. Colors were used to represent the amount of damage done to a specific body area; yellow represented minimal damage, orange represented moderate damage, and red represented maximum damage.

Included with the release of WWE SmackDown! vs. Raw was the option of fighting "dirty" or "clean". When players select "dirty", the player character is booed by the audience in the game; conversely, the "clean" character is cheered by the audience. With the "dirty" or "clean" option comes the inclusion of performing a special maneuver when playing. Players using a "dirty" character must direct them into building up their "dirty" meter by performing "dirty" tactics, such as attacking the referee or taking the pad off the ring's turnbuckle. Unlike performing dirty tactics, "clean" characters build their meters by performing "clean" tactics, such as an aerial technique or performing a taunt. When "dirty" character' meters build up, they are able to perform a signature low blow; likewise, "clean" characters can perform their signature move at double its normal damage.

With the release of WWE SmackDown! vs. Raw 2006 was the inclusion of a stamina system, which was a measure of the characters' stamina. The stamina system was measured by a meter on the HUD; the meter decreased when performing a variety of moves. The meter increases when the player does nothing with the character or holds down a selected button that increased the stamina, which varied depending on the player's system. When the character's stamina was low, the wrestler reacted by moving slower when performing moves, walking, and running. If the meter decreased completely, they fell to the ground until the meter increased. This system is disabled by default for WWE SmackDown vs. Raw 2008 and was disabled until 2K took over the series, bringing in a similar system with WWE 2K16.

The weak/strong grapple system from the past games was removed from WWE '12 onwards. Characters now perform different moves based on their opponent's current physical state. Players now have a window of opportunity to attack while still in a downed state and can also interrupt moves and Royal Rumble eliminations with attacks. Similarly, the pinning meter from the past games has been reworked to make it more difficult to kick out as a wrestler takes more damage. The game's artificial intelligence has also been adjusted to prevent players from overusing the same move. In addition, the ability to store finishing moves has returned. "Dynamic Comebacks" gives players on the verge of losing the opportunity to successfully hit a combination of moves to gain two finishing moves. New "wake up taunts" bring a downed opponent to their feet for a finishing move (such as pounding on the ground before RKO finishing maneuver). Players also have the ability to target specific limbs during matches and perform submissions through a "Breaking Point" submission minigame.

=== Story modes ===
In the WWE SmackDown vs. Raw series, the player was able to choose a character from a roster and compete in an arcade-like feature called season mode. In season mode, players direct their characters through different career obstacles through a year of WWE programming to gain respect by other wrestlers and popularity among the fans. Like storylines from WWE, the characters in the WWE SmackDown vs. Raw series season mode are involved in storylines that affect their career mode in some way. Beginning with the release of WWE SmackDown! Shut Your Mouth, the WWE Brand Extension has been included in season mode, and characters are exclusive to one brand of WWE. A result of this feature is that the player's character may only wrestle others and compete for championships from the same brand on which they are a part of. In season mode, the player's character has the ability to earn and wrestle for a variety of championships based on actual WWE championships. When characters win championships, their respect and popularity increase, which also increases their involvement in main event matches. As the character's respect and popularity increases through the year of WWE programming, it becomes more likely for the player to achieve the main goal in season mode, which is to earn a World Heavyweight Championship or WWE Championship match at WrestleMania, the WWE's flagship pay-per-view event and the final stage in season mode. After the final stage, season modes begins again with the same character chosen before, though the player has the option of switching characters. They are then a part of the WWE Draft Lottery and assigned to a brand.

=== Exhibition mode ===
A screenshot of a ladder match featuring Jeff Hardy and Kurt Angle in WWF SmackDown! 2: Know Your Role

Other than the season mode, every game features an exhibition mode, where different professional wrestling match types are available. Basic matches included in every game are "one-on-one" matches, where a player chooses one character to wrestle another bot operated or human operated character, or tag team matches, where a pair of characters team together to face another team, Mixed Gender Tag Team matches have been removed in WWE 2K18. These basic matches may also expand into six-man tag team matches or non-elimination type matches, which include four or more characters. Besides basic matches, hardcore based matches are also included, such as the Steel Cage match, which has been included in every game, the Ladder match, the Elimination Chamber, which was first included with the release of WWE SmackDown! Here Comes the Pain, and ECW Extreme Rules matches, which is basic hardcore wrestling based on the ECW brand of WWE (which first appeared with the release of WWE SmackDown vs. Raw 2008). Also included in every game is the Royal Rumble match, which is based on WWE's actual Royal Rumble match, in which a player chooses to compete as one character, and must wrestle against twenty-nine other characters.

=== Online gameplay ===
Starting with the release of WWE SmackDown! vs. Raw, online gameplay was made available through PlayStation 2's Sony Network Adapter. Online gameplay was kept at a minimum, as online players only had two game modes to compete in: one-on-one and a strip match, in which a player competes as any female wrestler in WWE and strips the opposition of her clothes, until she is left with only her undergarments. When WWE SmackDown! vs. Raw 2006 was released, the online gameplay was changed, and players were able to compete in more match types, defend the created championships, and compete with up to four players in each match. With the release of WWE SmackDown vs. Raw 2008 on the Xbox 360 console (PlayStation 3 would not see this feature until WWE SmackDown vs. Raw 2009), players were able to select music from their system's hard disk drive into the video game, where the music can be used in character' ring entrances.

=== Roster ===
Every game in the WWE series includes a roster of characters, "superstars" and "divas", based on people who perform for WWE. Every year, WWE acquires new people and releases old ones. As a result, every time a WWE SmackDown vs. Raw game is released, the new characters are added into the game and the old are removed from the game to reflect the changes in the actual WWE. From the release of WWF SmackDown! to the release of WWF SmackDown! Just Bring It, characters were not divided into brands. In 2002, the WWE split its roster into two brands of wrestling, called Raw and SmackDown!, which were named after WWE's television shows. The WWE Brand Extension was first featured in WWE SmackDown! Shut Your Mouth. In 2006, WWE launched a new brand, called ECW, which was named after the original Extreme Championship Wrestling promotion. The new ECW brand was first featured in WWE SmackDown vs. Raw 2008.

WWE holds an annual draft lottery, in which WWE characters switch brands. The games in production when the draft occurs include the changes that take place in the draft. For example, when WWE SmackDown vs. Raw 2008 was in production during June 2007, the 2007 WWE Draft took place, and the draft changes were included in the video game. Another brand of wrestling included in the series is the legends program, which was first included with the release of WWE SmackDown! Here Comes the Pain. Popular WWE alumni or members of the WWE Hall of Fame have been included since then under the legends program. This was featured up until the release of WWE SmackDown vs. Raw 2008, as alumni and Hall of Fame members were not featured in WWE SmackDown vs. Raw 2009 due to production of WWE Legends of WrestleMania. WWE SmackDown vs. Raw 2009 was also the first game to feature characters as downloadable content (DLC).

WWE '12 has 56 wrestlers and 78 by DLC, WWE '13 with 84 and 107 by DLC, WWE 2K14 with 82 and 103 by DLC, WWE 2K15 with 76 and 113 with DLC, WWE 2K (Mobile) with 19, WWE 2K16 with 133 including DLC giving this title "the highest character roster in the video game's history" with 165. WWE 2K17 carries 145 for the physical disc versions for PS3 and Xbox 360; 150 for the NXT Edition made for PS4 and Xbox One with DLC at 172. WWE 2K18 contains 197 for the standard version (202 via Deluxe and Collector's Edition) with DLC announced at a later date. An update on the WWE 2K18 roster revealed on September 25, 2017, the final roster is 220 (197 on disc virtually reading 204 by attires counted). WWE 2K19 has 217 characters on disc (224 via Woo Edition) and 236 with DLC counted as final. WWE 2K20 has 217 characters on disc (221 via SmackDown 20th Anniversary Edition) with DLC yet to be finalized.

WWE 2K22 has 173 in its base roster with the DLC pushing the expanded character list to 214. WWE 2K23 has 221 on the internal base roster with 25 others for DLC given an immense total of 246 (surpassing the WWE 2K16 roster by double the portion) but 30 less than WWE 2K20, which had 276. WWE 2K24 base number is at 265 at launch (331 at post launch). WWE 2K24 introduces the persona card method via MyFaction, which attributed to the roster number. WWE 2K25 was set at 363 at launch and broke the 400 wrestler mark via MyFaction, reaching 436, at the time having the record for the largest roster in a WWE 2K game. WWE 2K26 has since beaten the record with 472, and with DLC 512. WWE 2K25 was the first title in the series to supersede over 100 women wrestlers in any wrestling game developed and the second since WWE 2K20 to allow MyCareer (MyRise) characters join the playable roster.

=== Create mode ===
The series features a create-a-superstar mode, where players are able to create their own wrestler, including their move set and ring entrances. The feature was introduced when WWF SmackDown! was released in 2000. As new games were released, the mode was altered; the first change came with the release of WWF SmackDown! 2: Know Your Role, which featured a mode in which wrestler taunts could be created and customized. This was further modified in WWE SmackDown! Shut Your Mouth, which enabled players to create the walking style of a wrestler. With the release of WWE SmackDown! vs. RAW 2006, the game first featured the ability for players to make an entrance for the created character. The feature was expanded with the release of WWE SmackDown vs. Raw 2007, as players could place pyrotechnics and special effects in any part of the character's entrance.

== Cover stars ==
Game	Standard edition cover stars	Released
Attitude Era (1997–2001)
WWF SmackDown!	The Rock, Chyna, Billy Gunn, and Mankind	2000
WWF SmackDown! 2: Know Your Role	The Rock, Chris Jericho, Triple H, and The Undertaker	2000
WWF SmackDown! Just Bring It	The Rock, Spike Dudley, Triple H, and Kurt Angle	2001
Ruthless Aggression era (2002–2008)
WWE SmackDown! Shut Your Mouth	Kurt Angle, Brock Lesnar, Triple H, Chris Jericho, and Booker T	2002
WWE SmackDown! Here Comes The Pain	Brock Lesnar, Rey Mysterio, Matt Hardy, The Undertaker, John Cena, and Torrie Wilson	2003
WWE SmackDown! vs. Raw	Vince McMahon	2004
WWE SmackDown! vs. Raw 2006	Batista and John Cena	2005
WWE SmackDown vs. Raw 2007	Rey Mysterio, John Cena, Torrie Wilson, Triple H, and Batista	2006
WWE SmackDown vs. Raw 2008	John Cena, The Undertaker, and Bobby Lashley	2007
PG Era (2008–2014)
WWE SmackDown vs. Raw 2009	D-Generation X (Triple H and Shawn Michaels)	2008
WWE SmackDown vs. Raw 2010	Edge, The Undertaker, John Cena, Randy Orton, and Rey Mysterio	2009
WWE SmackDown vs. Raw 2011	Big Show, John Cena, and The Miz	2010
WWE '12	Randy Orton	2011
WWE '13	CM Punk	2012
WWE 2K14	The Rock	2013
Reality Era (2014–2016)
WWE 2K15	John Cena	2014
WWE 2K16	"Stone Cold" Steve Austin	2015
New Era (2016–2021)
WWE 2K17	Brock Lesnar	2016
WWE 2K18	Seth Rollins	2017
WWE 2K19	AJ Styles	2018
WWE 2K20	Becky Lynch and Roman Reigns	2019
Post-COVID-19 period (2021–2023)
WWE 2K22	Rey Mysterio	2022
WWE 2K23	John Cena	2023
TKO ownership period (2023–present)
WWE 2K24	Cody Rhodes	2024
WWE 2K25	Roman Reigns and Paul Heyman	2025
WWE 2K26	CM Punk	2026
WWE 2K27	TBD	2027

== Reception ==
Aggregate review scores
Game	Metacritic
WWF SmackDown!	(PS1) 86% (Note: GameRankings score)
WWF SmackDown! 2: Know Your Role	(PS1) 90/100
WWF SmackDown! Just Bring It	(PS2) 76/100
WWE SmackDown! Shut Your Mouth	(PS2) 82/100
WWE SmackDown! Here Comes the Pain	(PS2) 85/100
WWE SmackDown! vs. Raw	(PS2) 80/100
WWE SmackDown! vs. Raw 2006	(PS2) 84/100 (PSP) 81/100
WWE SmackDown vs. Raw 2007	(PS2) 80/100 (PSP) 78/100 (X360) 81/100
WWE SmackDown vs. Raw 2008	(NDS) 61/100 (PS2) 71/100 (PS3) 74/100 (PSP) 68/100 (Wii) 59/100 (X360) 71/100
WWE SmackDown vs. Raw 2009	(NDS) 58/100 (PS2) 78/100 (PS3) 78/100 (PSP) 72/100 (Wii) 79/100 (X360) 79/100
WWE SmackDown vs. Raw 2010	(NDS) 75/100 (PS3) 81/100 (Wii) 78/100 (X360) 80/100
WWE SmackDown vs. Raw 2011	(PS3) 74/100 (Wii) 72/100 (X360) 75/100
WWE '12	(PS3) 72/100 (Wii) 74/100 (X360) 71/100
WWE '13	(PS3) 76/100 (Wii) 74/100 (X360) 78/100
WWE 2K14	(PS3) 74/100 (X360) 75/100
WWE 2K15	(PC) 70/100 (PS3) 55/100 (PS4) 62/100 (X360) 50/100 (XONE) 56/100
WWE 2K16	(PC) 74/100 (PS4) 73/100 (XONE) 72/100
WWE 2K	(iOS) 73/100
WWE 2K17	(PC) 61/100 (PS4) 69/100 (XONE) 68/100
WWE 2K18	(NS) 35/100 (PC) 64/100 (PS4) 66/100 (XONE) 67/100
WWE 2K19	(PS4) 77/100 (XONE) 77/100
WWE 2K20	(PC) 43/100 (PS4) 43/100 (XONE) 45/100
WWE 2K Battlegrounds	(NS) 56/100 (PS4) 60/100 (XONE) 58/100
WWE 2K22	(PC) 72/100 (PS4) 76/100 (PS5) 77/100 (XSX) 78/100
WWE 2K23	(PC) 79/100 (PS5) 82/100 (XBXS) 81/100
WWE 2K24	(PC) 78/100 (PS5): 81/100 (XSXS): 83/100
WWE 2K25	(PC) 83/100 (PS5): 80/100 (XSXS): 84/100
WWE 2K26	(PC) 82/100 (PS5): 80/100 (XSXS): 79/100

The original WWF SmackDown! sold over 975,000 units for the PlayStation, and selling over one million copies in the United States. By 2003, the series had sold more than 4.7 million units for the PlayStation and PlayStation 2 in the United States. The series as a whole initially received generally positive reviews; however, overall reception began to decline in the late 2000s, as later games were criticized for their lack of innovations or improvements from previous installments.
