= WWE '12 =

2011 video game

- Cover artwork featuring Randy Orton
- Developer: Yuke's
- Publisher: THQ
- Series: WWE
- Platforms: PlayStation 3 Wii; Xbox 360
- Release: NA: November 22, 2011; EU: November 25, 2011; JP: January 26, 2012 (PS3 only)
- Genre: Sports
- Modes: Single-player, multiplayer

WWE '12 is a professional wrestling video game developed by Yuke's and published by THQ for the PlayStation 3, Wii, and Xbox 360. It was released on November 22, 2011, in North America, November 25 in Europe, and on January 26, 2012, in Japan. A Europe-exclusive WWE '12 WrestleMania Edition was released on May 25, 2012.

The thirteenth overall installment in the WWE series, WWE '12 is the successor to WWE SmackDown vs. Raw 2011, and first game in the series to be developed exclusively for the seventh generation of home consoles.

The game was succeeded by WWE '13.

== Gameplay ==
=== Exhibition Mode ===
The weak/strong grapple system from the past games has been removed. Characters now perform different moves based on their opponent's current physical state. Players now have a window of opportunity to attack while still in a downed state and can also interrupt moves and Royal Rumble eliminations with attacks. Similarly, the pinning meter from the past games has been reworked to make it more difficult to kick out as a wrestler takes more damage. The game's artificial intelligence has also been adjusted to prevent players from overusing the same move. In addition, the ability to store finishing moves has returned. A new feature called "Dynamic Comebacks" gives players on the verge of losing the opportunity to successfully hit a combination of moves to gain two finishing moves. New "wake up taunts" bring a downed opponent to their feet for a finishing move (such as Randy Orton pounding on the ground before his RKO finishing maneuver). Players also have the ability to target specific limbs during matches and perform submissions through a new "Breaking Point" submission minigame, named and branded after the 2009 one-off submission-themed pay-per-view of the same name.

=== WWE Universe ===
"WWE Universe", the mode in which players participate in matches and storylines that are booked automatically, returned from the previous year with additional cutscenes. Changed from the previous iteration, the mode allows for players to create a title match on any given date rather than exclusively on pay-per views. Although the ability to change rosters manually is available, the game features a two-week WWE draft event. Storylines that are made can be changed and revamped by including another superstar or diva or by interfering in matches, with some storylines allowing rivalries to turn into alliances and vice versa. The player is also given the option to change SmackDown and Raw into their own original or cancelled WWE shows, though changes are limited for Superstars and shows must remain on the same calendar date. The mode is also improved to strengthen the line of division between exhibition and universe mode, with the former no longer affecting universe mode stats and with the latter's match card being forced to be complete before advancing on to an event, unless the matches are simulated through the Universe Calendar. The mode also allows for players to injure other superstars through uses of multiple finishers or weapon shots. Superstar momentum has also been furthered, with superstars on winning and losing streaks attributes rising and falling respectively.

=== Road to WrestleMania ===
The "Road to WrestleMania", the mode in which players participate in a pre-scripted storyline featuring actual WWE wrestler voices also returned. Instead of choosing one of a number of different stories lasting three months each, the mode in WWE '12 consists of a single storyline taking place over eighteen months of WWE programming and encompassing two WrestleMania events (WrestleMania XXVI and WrestleMania XXVII). The mode is split into three acts, the first of which sees the player assuming the role of the villainous Sheamus. The second act is centered around the heroic Triple H and the final act features the player taking control of a created superstar named Jacob Cass (voiced by then-TNA wrestler Austin Aries). The game also includes creation modes for superstars, entrances, finishing moves, storylines, highlight reels, and introduced for the first time create-a-arena where the player can add color to the ring, aprons, turnbuckle, mat, change to steel or normal barricades and add custom logos. With future games having career showcases instead of storyline driven modes, WWE '12 is the final entry in the series to feature the "Road to WrestleMania" mode.

=== Roster ===
WWE '12 marks the video game debuts of 13 superstars.

== Development and release ==
There are noticeable differences in the appearance of the wrestlers in WWE '12 as opposed to SmackDown vs. Raw 2011. In this case, Randy Orton is wearing different attire and his hair has grown back.

WWE '12 was first announced on June 1, 2011 with the slogan, "Bigger, Badder, Better", which was the slogan of WrestleMania III. THQ promoted a new animation system dubbed "Predator Technology". The "Predator Technology" makes the wrestlers in the game look more realistic. In addition to allowing players to interrupt moves, attack animations such as John Cena's Five Knuckle Shuffle and Booker T's scissor kick no longer warp players to the center of the ring. More realistic ring rope physics have also been added, with ropes moving as characters are slammed to the mat. The developers have also made efforts to prevent the collision detection problems that have affected the series in the past. On July 28, 2011, it was announced that those who pre-ordered the game would be able to play as The Rock and also receive alternate attires for The Miz. On August 13, 2011, Jerry Lawler was announced as downloadable content (DLC). Total Nonstop Action Wrestling performer Austin Aries voiced the main character of Jacob Cass in the Road to WrestleMania mode.

On October 26, 2011, THQ revealed that the first DLC pack would consist of Shawn Michaels, Jerry Lawler, Jim Ross, Michael Cole, alternate attires for The Road Warriors, and tag team attires for Christian and Edge. The next day, information regarding the Divas DLC pack was released, announcing new playable characters including Trish Stratus, Kharma, Nikki and Brie Bella, Vickie Guerrero and Alicia Fox. It was also announced that Alicia Fox would be free DLC. The third DLC pack would include Batista, Brodus Clay, Randy Savage and Mick Foley. Released alongside the third DLC Pack was what THQ called "Make Good DLC", a masked version of Kane. The item was available free for the first two weeks to make good for the game's many technical issues. Some Xbox 360 users experienced a glitch with the Kane download in which they were forced to pay for the content, although the money was later refunded.

== Reception ==
Reception

Aggregate scores
Aggregator	Score
GameRankings	80.00% (1 review) (Wii); 75.44% (34 reviews) (X360); 71.81% (21 reviews) (PS3)
Metacritic	71/100 (52 reviews) (X360); 72/100 (28 reviews) (PS3); 74/100 (6 reviews) (Wii)

Review scores
Publication	Score
Computer and Video Games	6.7/10
G4	5/5 (Xbox 360); 5/5 (Wii); 5/5 (PS3)
Game Informer	5.5/10 (PS3); 5.5/10 (Xbox 360)
GamePro	3.5/5
GameSpot	6/10
GamesRadar+	8/10
GameTrailers	6.3/10 (Xbox 360)
IGN	9/10 (PS3); 9/10 (Xbox 360)
Nintendo Power	6.5/10
Official Nintendo Magazine	80%
Official Xbox Magazine (UK)	7/10
Official Xbox Magazine (US)	8.5/10
PALGN	8/10 (PS3)
Play	50/100 (PS3)
VideoGamer.com	6/10 (PS3); 6/10 (Xbox 360)

The Xbox 360 and PlayStation 3 versions of WWE '12 received generally positive reviews. IGN gave the game a 9.0 out of 10, stating that the gameplay changes are "breathing new life into its core mechanics". This makes WWE '12 one of IGN's highest rated wrestling game ever. Mike D'Alonzo of G4 called it "the best wrestling game ever made". However, Andy Hartup of Computer and Video Games gave the game a 6.7 out of 10 and wrote that the game "offers little more than some new gloss painted over an old product". Game Informer's Dan Ryckert echoed the sentiment, stating, "Thanks to a severely downgraded story mode and a lack of substantial improvements, this is the weakest WWE title in years."
