= WWE SmackDown vs. Raw 2009 =

2008 professional wrestling video game

- Cover art featuring D-Generation X (Triple H and Shawn Michaels)
- Developers: Yuke's; Tose (Nintendo DS)
- Publisher: THQ
- Series: SmackDown vs. Raw
- Platforms: Nintendo DS; PlayStation 2 PlayStation 3 PlayStation Portable; Wii; Xbox 360
- Release: AU: November 6, 2008; EU: November 7, 2008; NA: November 9, 2008; JP: January 22, 2009 (PS3)
- Genre: Sports
- Modes: Single player, multiplayer, multiplayer online

WWE SmackDown vs. Raw 2009 (also known as WWE SmackDown vs. Raw 2009 featuring ECW) is a professional wrestling video game developed by Yuke's and published by THQ for the PlayStation 2, PlayStation 3, PlayStation Portable, Wii, and Xbox 360 video game consoles, with TOSE overseeing development for the Nintendo DS version. The game was first released on November 9, 2008, in North America. It is the tenth overall installment in the video game series based on the World Wrestling Entertainment (WWE) promotion, and the fifth game under the SmackDown vs. Raw name, named after the promotion's Raw and SmackDown brands. It is the sequel to 2007's SmackDown vs. Raw 2008 and the second of three games to feature the promotion's ECW brand. It was the first game in the series to be released during the PG Era.

2009 introduced the Inferno match, a revamped tag team match, and four new game modes: "Create-a-Finisher", "Road to WrestleMania", "Career", and multiplayer season.

The game was succeeded by WWE SmackDown vs. Raw 2010.

== Road to WrestleMania ==
The Road to WrestleMania mode debuted in this game, replacing the popular Season mode from previous games. It was then featured in every new game in the series, before it was removed for WWE '13. This mode allows the player to play through personalized storylines for John Cena, Triple H, The Undertaker, Chris Jericho, CM Punk, and a tag team storyline for Batista and Rey Mysterio.

== Gameplay ==
=== Match gameplay ===
One of the game's most prominent features is the enhanced tag team match. Additions in the match include new ways of tagging the player's tag team partner such as the hot tag, which can help save the player in the match if they are in trouble, and the forced blind tag, where the illegal partner can tag his or herself into the ring. The legal player's tag team partner has more of a part to play in this match and will aid the player by holding an opponent on the ropes while on the apron (pictured), and pulling down the ropes for an opponent who is dashing towards them, sending them out of the ring. Teams will now share their own momentum meter, attributes and double team finishers.

Tag teams are a major focus in this game with a reworked tag team match and co-operative season mode.

SmackDown vs. Raw 2009 is the first WWE video game to include the Inferno match, a match where the player has to set their opponent on fire. It is similar to the real life match which takes place with the ring surrounded by fire coming from gas fed pipes. To win the player must increase the temperature of the ring by performing more devastating moves. As soon as the temperature reaches 500°F (or in the EU version 300°C), the player can then begin to set their opponent on fire. To set a person on fire, the player raises the temperature to the maximum and drags the person towards the ropes, provided that the opponent is badly injured. However, this match is not available for the Nintendo DS or Wii.

Several matches absent in previous games also returned to the series. The backstage brawl, where players can battle in either the locker room or the backstage "Gorilla position" with a variety of weapons at their disposal, returned and replaced the parking lot brawl match featured in the last game. The Gauntlet match is a newly featured match selection in the SmackDown vs. Raw 2009 series where one superstar takes on three others one immediately after the other. The General Manager mode and Create-A-Championship were removed from this version.

Both the Wii and DS versions now include new match types, such as the Steel Cage and Ladder match, with the DS version also featuring tables and TLC matches.

Fighting styles, a major feature from the previous version, were removed. Some abilities used there were kept and enhanced with each wrestler possessing six out of twenty different abilities that would aid the player in specific areas. New to the game is the inclusion of signature moves, moves secondary in importance next to their finishing moves. When in full momentum, the players can choose to store a signature move instead of performing a finishing move which they can perform later.

A new semi-auto targeting system was implemented into the game, which will generally automatically target a particular wrestler the player wants to attack but can also be controlled in-game by the player.

Japanese company TOSE took over from Amaze Entertainment in development for the Nintendo DS version. Unlike the previous year's game whose gameplay was focused exclusively on the handheld's stylus, this year's edition instead uses by default the D-pad for movement and the left shoulder button for finishing moves. The DS version's gameplay is now similar to that from the other consoles with full movement control around the ring for the wrestler and a stamina meter to build up for a finishing move. Grappling, attacks and submissions would still be controlled by the stylus.

=== Game modes ===
Road to WrestleMania: In this new mode, players can choose from five superstars to play as in single-player storylines: Triple H, CM Punk, The Undertaker, John Cena, or Chris Jericho. The storylines featured in the mode are tailor-made to fit the chosen wrestler's character with each cutscene made exclusively for the wrestler.

- As part of the game's new emphasis on tag teams, a co-operative storyline was also included in the mode, in which players can take the parts of Rey Mysterio or Batista. For the first time the Wii version also includes the Road to WrestleMania mode, replacing their equivalent Main Event mode in the previous edition.

Career Mode: Unlike the Road to WrestleMania mode, all superstars and divas featured in the game are eligible to play including wrestlers created by the player in Create-A-Superstar mode. The main aim of this mode is for the player to fight their way up the rankings for a particular title of their choice, in match types that they can also choose. After each match, the player's character is awarded attribute points based on the style of wrestling the player used.

Nintendo DS: Fully inspired by the TOSE-developed game, Dragon Quest Heroes: Rocket Slime, the Nintendo DS version has an RPG element to their season mode. Players will be able to roam around the arena, improve their characters through the training room or WWE Shop and interact with superstars to start feuds. The player is given missions to complete in order to become a champion. Created wrestlers will be eligible to use this career mode.

=== Create modes ===
The series features a new Create Mode: The Create-A-Finisher feature. In it, the player has the ability to chain a selection of up to 10 out of over 500 animations to make unique finishing moves along with the choice to speed up or slow down the animations. Created finishers are limited to moves starting with both wrestlers standing face-to-face The Create-A-Finisher feature is not available on the Wii or DS versions of the game.

The other major new addition to the game's create modes is the "Highlight Reel", where players can record the last 30 seconds of an ongoing match, and edit the clips together afterwards with custom camera angles and added visual and sound effects. Players can save up to 20 files and can upload them for online users to see, and custom reels can be used as an entrance movie for a created superstar. The mode is featured only on PlayStation 3 and Xbox 360. Both Create-A-Finisher and Highlight Reel have replaced the Create-A-Belt feature, which was taken out due to its lack of support from fans.

The Create-A-Superstar mode is in the major consoles, but now features physics-based clothing items that will sway around realistically such as loose clothing and necklaces. About 70% of the parts in the mode are now 3D with about 25 to 30% of the mode featuring new content. For the first time, the Nintendo DS version features a limited version of the Create-A-Superstar mode.

A roster editor has also been introduced to change the wrestler's brand, face/heel disposition and titles for exhibition matches. The game's Create-A-Stable mode has also been incorporated into the editor under the Team Management name.

The Create-An-Entrance mode has now been extended to feature created entrances for tag teams. The Wii version features a Create-An-Entrance mode like the other versions except a limited created entrance for tag teams. Instead, utilizing the Wii Remote and nunchuk, it features interactive entrances and victory celebrations, such as posing or beating down an opponent post-match. Successful poses during the player's entrance give them more momentum and bonuses at the start of the match.

=== Online features ===
The Wii version included online gameplay as well as rankings. Voice chat functionality is present in PlayStation 3 and Xbox 360 versions. Also, if a tattoo is used on a created superstar, he/she will be prohibited from playing online. Online play is not available for the PlayStation 2 version.

== Development ==
The in-game commentary in the major console versions feature three announcing teams like the previous version but is considered to have a more play-by-play aspect this time. According to THQ, loading times for the game have been reduced by 50%, affecting such areas as wrestler entrances.

=== Soundtrack ===
The soundtrack consists of a mixture of entrance theme songs used by the wrestlers (many of which are composed by WWE's music director Jim Johnston) and the following licensed songs.

Artist	Song
Bloodsimple	"Dead Man Walking"
Burn Halo	"Save Me"
Disturbed	"Perfect Insanity"
Egypt Central	"Taking You Down"
Egypt Central	"You Make Me Sick"
The Exies	"Lay Your Money Down"
Murs	"SWC"
P.O.D.	"Addicted"
Steriogram	"Get Up"
SiX	"Better Than Mine"

The players can also give any wrestler their own entrance music from any audio file saved on console's hard drive, although this feature is restricted to the Xbox 360 and PlayStation 3 versions of the game, as the other consoles have no capability to save MP3s or other format sound files, and this is not the first game to include the feature on Xbox 360 and PlayStation 3, as the previous game, WWE SmackDown vs. Raw 2008 was the first game for both systems to allow the feature.

P.O.D. contributed with two of their songs, "Addicted" and "Booyaka 619", featured in the game's soundtrack.

== Marketing and release ==
The contents of the collector's edition for the PlayStation 3 in North America

Production of the game was officially announced in March 2008 by IGN and THQ. IGN released their first video game trailer and screenshots for SmackDown vs. Raw 2009. The trailer featured The Hardys (Matt and Jeff) in a tag team match against Randy Orton and Mr. Kennedy at the SummerSlam pay-per-view and the new tag team match features were explained. A commercial for the game was released in October, starring Triple H along with John Cena, Batista, Big Show, Hornswoggle, Lilian Garcia and Kelly Kelly.

A demo for the game was released in October for the PlayStation 3 console, featuring the singles and tag team matches with Jeff Hardy, Matt Hardy, Shawn Michaels and Triple H as playable characters.

As with the previous game, a special collector's edition of SmackDown vs. Raw 2009 for the PlayStation 3 was released, which includes the game, special steel cage packaging, and a Blu-ray Disc featuring matches from Raw and SmackDown shows as well as a behind-the-scenes documentary on the making of the game. This release was exclusive to the North American region.

A similar collector's edition was released in European regions, which features a special plastic ring, which has the same dimensions as a Blu-ray case. It also has the same Blu-ray disc as the North American release included in this package.

The game had a marketing budget of $5 million.

== Reception ==
Reception

Aggregate scores
Aggregator	Score					
Aggregator	DS	PS2	PS3	PSP	Wii	Xbox 360
GameRankings	56.76%	77.44%	78.14%	72.90%	78.28%	79.38%
Metacritic	58/100	78/100	78/100	72/100	79/100	79/100

Review scores
Publication	Score					
Publication	DS	PS2	PS3	PSP	Wii	Xbox 360
Destructoid	N/A	N/A	8/10	N/A	N/A	8/10
Game Informer	N/A	N/A	8.5/10	N/A	N/A	8.5/10
GamePro	N/A	N/A	N/A	N/A	N/A	4/5
GameRevolution	N/A	N/A	B	N/A	N/A	B
GameSpot	N/A	7.5/10	7.5/10	N/A	7.5/10	7.5/10
GameSpy	N/A	N/A	4/5	N/A	N/A	4/5
GameTrailers	N/A	N/A	N/A	N/A	N/A	8/10
GameZone	6.8/10	7/10	7.5/10	7.5/10	7.7/10	8.5/10
Giant Bomb	N/A	N/A	2/5	N/A	N/A	2/5
IGN	7.5/10	7/10	7.8/10	6.5/10	7.8/10	7.9/10
Nintendo Power	4/10	N/A	N/A	N/A	8/10	N/A
Official Xbox Magazine (US)	N/A	N/A	N/A	N/A	N/A	8.5/10
PlayStation: The Official Magazine	N/A	N/A	4.5/5	N/A	N/A	N/A

The game has received generally mixed to positive reviews from gaming critics. GameRankings and Metacritic gave it a score of 79.38% and 79 out of 100 for the Xbox 360 version; 78.28% and 79 out of 100 for the Wii version; 78.14% and 78 out of 100 for the PlayStation 3 version; 77.44% and 78 out of 100 for the PlayStation 2 version; 72.90% and 72 out of 100 for the PSP version; 60% for the Mobile version; and 56.76% and 58 out of 100 for the DS version.

Critics generally praised the Road to WrestleMania. IGN was, however, more critical of the game, calling the gameplay "noticeably stale" from previous games and citing the Highlight Reel and Create-A-Finisher modes as limited. GameSpot gave the console versions 7.5 out of 10, lauding the game's graphics and the large number of moves, match types, single player modes and improved AI. Some aspects of the game's presentation were criticized, particularly movement animations, clipping issues and weak sound effects. While the reception for the Nintendo DS version was varied between critics, both IGN and GamesMaster criticized its touch-screen control scheme, suggesting that button-based control would have been more ideal.

During the 12th Annual Interactive Achievement Awards, the Academy of Interactive Arts & Sciences nominated SmackDown vs. Raw 2009 for "Fighting Game of the Year".

== See also ==
- List of licensed wrestling video games
- List of fighting games
- List of video games in the WWE 2K Games series
- WWE 2K
