= WWE 2K14 =

2013 wrestling video game

- Cover art featuring The Rock
- Developer: Yuke's
- Publisher: 2K
- Director: Taku Chihaya
- Producer: Hiromi Furuta
- Designers: Takuro Yamamori; Takayoshi Akasaka
- Programmers: Reiji Sato; Koji Hayashi; Junichi Taguchi
- Series: WWE 2K
- Platforms: PlayStation 3 Xbox 360
- Release: NA: October 29, 2013; JP: October 30, 2013; AU: October 31, 2013; EU: November 1, 2013; IND: November 1, 2013
- Genre: Sports
- Modes: Single-player, multiplayer

WWE 2K14 is a professional wrestling video game developed by Yuke's and published by 2K for the PlayStation 3 and Xbox 360. It was released on October 29, 2013, in North America, October 30, 2013, in Japan, October 31, 2013, in Australia, and November 1, 2013, in Europe and India. The game's box art features The Rock as the cover athlete. It received generally mixed-to-positive reviews.

Succeeding 2012's WWE '13, 2K14 is the first game in the WWE 2K series, and is the first game to be published after Take-Two Interactive gained the license for WWE video games from THQ in a bankruptcy filing. It was also the last video game to use WWE's "scratch" logo that first appeared in the Attitude Era.

The game is succeeded by WWE 2K15 in 2014.

== Gameplay ==
2K14 is primarily an update of WWE '13, featuring various changes to modes and mechanics, along with several new features.

=== Exhibition ===
Improvements have been made to the navigation system, allowing for more fluid walking, running, and dragging motions. Characters also move faster than previously; before running, characters display "starting up" animations, to prevent players from spamming running attacks. All chain reversals now result in offensive attacks, to make for quicker matches by avoiding continuous reversal stalemates. Catapult finishers can now be used offensively. Some characters can launch an opponent into the air and catch them for a catch finisher. Seven new "OMG!" moments have been added, allowing certain finishers to be done on two opponents, and players to interact with the arena environment. The nearfall system has been improved with more than two counts. A "Slobberknocker Mode", adapted from "The Streak" mode, had been added as a gauntlet match.

=== Create Suite ===
"Create-a-Superstar" now features expanded character save slots for up to 100 created superstars. The mode also introduces the ability to use existing superstars as a template for new custom variants. "Create-a-Championship" has been expanded after being limited in WWE '13.

== Story modes ==
=== 30 Years of WrestleMania ===
WWE 2K14 features a single-player campaign called "The 30 Years of WrestleMania", which recreates nearly three decades of WWE history. Similar to WWE '13's "Attitude Era mode", "30 Years of WrestleMania" spans 45 matches centered around various Superstars, alternate gimmicks, and the use of classic WWE footage across every Wrestlemania event up unto WrestleMania 29. The storylines distinctly follow characters who were involved in memorable WrestleMania matches.

In "Wrestlemania mode", matches have primary objectives that are required to be completed and bonus historical objectives to recreate iconic moments. In some cases, the player will follow a guided sequence of inputs as a quick-time, rather than freely control their character. Storylines cover five 'era's of WWE's history;

"Hulkamania Runs Wild", which focuses on Hulk Hogan in early WrestleMania events during the Golden Age of Wrestling, such as Hogan's iconic match with André the Giant at WrestleMania III or his encounter with Ultimate Warrior at WrestleMania VI.

"The New Generation" chapter showcases the rise of Bret Hart and Shawn Michaels in the mid-1990s, featuring Hart's win over Yokozuna at WrestleMania X and the Iron Man match between Hart and Michaels at WrestleMania XII.

The "Attitude Era" chapter brings back storylines featured in WWE '13's "Attitude Era" mode alongside new storylines, such as The Undertaker versus Kane, with Paul Bearer by his side, at WrestleMania XIV to a no disqualification match between "Stone Cold" Steve Austin and The Rock for the WWE Championship at WrestleMania X-Seven.

The "Ruthless Aggression" chapter focuses on the departure of The Rock, lessened focus on Triple H and rise of John Cena, from The Rock versus Hulk Hogan at WrestleMania X8 to a triple threat match between John Cena, Triple H and Randy Orton for the WWE Championship at WrestleMania XXIV.

The final "Universe Era" chapter focuses on the rise of Randy Orton and the returns of The Rock and Brock Lesnar, from a triple threat match between Edge, John Cena and The Big Show for the World Heavyweight Championship at WrestleMania 25 to a rematch of the "Once in a Lifetime" match at WrestleMania XXVIII between The Rock and John Cena for the WWE Championship at WrestleMania 29.

=== "The Streak" ===
The game has a mode that focuses on The Undertaker's WrestleMania winning streak of 21 matches (at the time of the game's release) from WrestleMania VII, where he defeated Jimmy Snuka, to WrestleMania XXIX, where he defeated CM Punk, before being defeated for the first time by Brock Lesnar at WrestleMania XXX. As The Undertaker, the player can battle waves of opponents attempting to break the streak. The player can also select any wrestler from the roster and challenge The Undertaker at any WrestleMania arena. The difficulty level is higher than in any previous WWE game; The Undertaker can chokeslam the player if they are grabbed by the head, submit the player with the Hell's Gate when The Undertaker is grounded, and teleport behind the player once in an animation previously reserved for when The Undertaker interferes in a match with a finisher stored.

=== WWE Universe ===
"WWE Universe" is overhauled, carrying over features from previous games, while introducing new features of its own. The player can customize existing WWE Shows, bring back retired series, or create their own original shows. They can choose the superstars participating in these shows and the titles featured on them. The ability to choose the status of a WWE Superstar, whether assigned to one show, several, a legend, or a free agent is also available.

A new feature introduced is the Rivalry Manager. Corroborating with an updated statistics tracker, "Rivalry Manager" can track all rivalries as well divide storylines into periods based on dates, during which period the rivalry will continue depending on in-ring decisions. Previous "Universe" storylines from earlier games have been revamped to use the "Rivalry Manager".

== Marketing and release ==
Casey Collins, WWE Executive Vice President of Consumer Products, revealed on June 4 at the WWE Global Business Partner Summit, that The Rock would be featured on the cover of WWE 2K14. The official cover and trailer were revealed on the June 24 episode of WWE Raw.

In July, Ultimate Warrior was announced as a pre-order exclusive playable character. On August 1, 2K Games announced a special "Phenom Edition" which included Undertaker-themed extras, including the "American Badass" gimmick as a playable character.

== Reception ==
Reception

Aggregate score
Aggregator	Score
Metacritic	(X360) 75/100 (PS3) 74/100

Review scores
Publication	Score
Game Informer	8/10
GameSpot	6/10
IGN	8.7/10

WWE 2K14 received generally mixed-to-positive reviews, with the Xbox 360 version receiving "generally favorable" reviews", while the PS3 version received "mixed or average" reviews from critics, according to review aggregator Metacritic which gave the Xbox 360 version a score of 75/100 based on 42 reviews and the PlayStation 3 version a score of 74/100 based on 21 reviews.

IGN gave the game an 8.7 out of 10 saying "It still lacks the brains to deliver competent AI and commentators, but WWE 2K14 has more than enough brawn to make up for it. 30 Years of Wrestlemania provides the strongest campaign backbone the series has had in a long time, the in-ring action is faster and more fluid than it's been in years, and thanks to WWE 2K14's continually expanding creation suite, we're swimming in more options than we ever knew we wanted. It is indeed "time to play the game". GameSpot rated the game a 6 out of 10, saying that the game was clunky, stating "It's a shame the wrestling isn't up to par in WWE 2K14 because the elements surrounding it are so interesting... For anyone who grew up loving professional wrestling, be prepared to be swept away in a tide of nostalgia. If only the core action could have been as compelling." Game Informer gave the game an 8/10, highlighting "The 30 Years of WrestleMania" campaign as "great to play through so many good memories".

== See also ==
- List of licensed wrestling video games
- List of fighting games
- List of video games in the WWE 2K Games series
- WWE 2K
