= WWE '13 =

2012 wrestling video game

- Cover artwork featuring CM Punk
- Developer: Yuke's
- Publishers: THQ; 2K
- Series: WWE
- Platforms: PlayStation 3 Wii; Xbox 360
- Release: THQ: NA: October 30, 2012; AU: November 1, 2012; EU: November 2, 2012
- Genre: Sports
- Modes: Single-player, multiplayer

WWE '13 is a professional wrestling video game developed by Yuke's and published by THQ for the PlayStation 3, Xbox 360 and Wii. It was released on October 30, 2012, in North America and November 2, 2012, in United Kingdom. It is the fourteenth overall installment in the WWE series, the sequel to WWE '12, and the last installment to be released on a Nintendo console until WWE 2K18 for the Nintendo Switch in 2017. It was also the last WWE-licensed game to be published by THQ before the company's demise in January 2013, ending their relationship with WWE after 14 years.

WWE '13 focuses on the promotion's Attitude Era, replacing "Road to WrestleMania" with a new "Attitude Era" mode where the player plays through six different storylines inspired from that time period. In addition to an updated "Predator Technology engine", the game adds in a new audio system called "WWE Live". The game is said to be the second phase of a "Revolution" in WWE video games, with cover athlete CM Punk taking charge.

Following its release, the game received positive reviews from critics and was nominated for the Spike Video Game Award for Best Individual Sports Game.

WWE '13 was succeeded by WWE 2K14 in 2013.

== Gameplay ==
=== Mechanics ===
WWE '13 runs on the second major revision of Predator Technology, introduced in WWE '12. This revision allows for more fluid animations, and improves on weight detection system, contextual animations, and automatic attack homing, to ensure that the character always strikes toward opponents. The contextual animation system has been refined to ensure that it dynamically swaps out moves to make sure that the game is using the appropriate move animations at any given time and state. The weight detection system makes it so that small superstars such as Rey Mysterio are unable to lift larger wrestlers such as the Big Show.

The game's new homing system is designed so that when doing high-flying moves, a player will hit the intended target with better precision. The homing system also tracks tables so that they will be better detected when doing grapples on a ladder in TLC and Ladder matches. This feature allows for environmental moves such as ring breaks, barricade breaks, announce table breaks, and catching (mid-air) finishers to be possible.

The audio system has been improved, with remastered sound effects and crowd reactions. Online servers have been enhanced to allow players to test out creations before downloading them into the game.

The "Special Referee" match type returns from its last appearance in WWE SmackDown vs. Raw 2007.

== Story Modes ==
=== Attitude Era Mode ===
The game's "Attitude Era" mode feature 35 superstars and over 60 cutscenes that detail aspects of the Era. To fill in the gaps and storylines necessary to understand a feud or match's context, THQ worked with WWE editors to produce 20 video packages. The "Monday Night War" with World Championship Wrestling (WCW), a major element of the era, is given a nod through the way of a rating chart that follows the player as they progress throughout the mode. Smaller details, such as entrances, arenas and television graphics from the time period have also been recreated.

Players have the option to recreate several moments from the Attitude Era, allowing them to unlock over 100 items. Commentary from Jerry Lawler and Jim Ross, who were WWE's main commentary team during the period, are present, with re-recorded commentary along with archived audio in certain points during in-game cutscenes. Though Lawler is present in Exhibition and Universe modes alongside Michael Cole, Ross' commentary is only featured in "Attitude Era" mode.

"Attitude Era" mode features various storylines and moments played out over a two-year season of 65 matches from Shawn Michaels versus Mankind at Raw at the start of the "Rise of DX" chapter to a no disqualification match between The Rock and Stone Cold Steve Austin for the WWE Championship at WrestleMania XV at the end of the "WrestleMania XV" chapter. These matches are divided into chapters of varying lengths, each focusing on certain WWE Superstars. Such characters include "Stone Cold" Steve Austin, The Rock, D-Generation X, The Undertaker, Mick Foley, Kane and Bret Hart. "Off Script" is an epilogue set between WCW's 2001 bankruptcy and acquisition, into the "Ruthless Aggression" era, from Kane versus Vader at Over the Edge 1998 to Lita versus Trish Stratus at Raw. It features The Godfather, Vader, Chris Jericho, Edge & Christian (Edge and Christian), Lita, Trish Stratus, Eddie Guerrero and The Acolytes (as The APA),.

=== Universe Mode ===
The Universe Mode was developed with assistance from Paul Heyman. New additions include the ability to use created arenas and stadiums on any given show. Each recurring show, divided into major and minor, can have their theme, roster, belt, and arenas adjusted. However, only "major" shows are allowed to have belts assigned to them. The option to create a pay-per-view has also returned, and players get the option to choose which rosters are able to participate in the PPV, and what theme or match type is consistent throughout the event. Players can delete shows entirely, add new shows, or move shows around on any day of the week.

Statistics and rankings are also once again included, the former of which divides ranks into tracking record holders, historical information, the period of time a title was held, and the number of times a title was held. Titles are again divided into minor, major, tag-team, and divas. Scenarios also play out differently, with the game giving the player options to lead out to a branching storyline based on decisions made within the match. This allows players to choose how to attack during cutscenes, not to attack, and gives the option to break up tag teams and alliances. This allows for over 200 new storyline possibilities. Finally, the option to turn injuries on and off is also present.

== Downloadable content ==
On October 3, THQ announced the downloadable content for WWE '13, with three packs to be released over the course of three months. Each superstar will be available for 80 Microsoft Points or $0.99 on the PlayStation Network to buy separately and with the Accelerator Boost, Championship Belt Pack and Moves Pack for 160 Microsoft Points or $1.99 on PSN each. Fan Axxess returns, where, all the packs are included at a one time cost of 1600 Microsoft Points or $19.99 on PSN. Players who get the Axxess will get Diamond Dallas Page and Goldust playable characters exclusively.

- The first pack, the "Attitude Era" Superstars Pack, includes Rikishi, Scotty 2 Hotty, Grandmaster Sexay, Gangrel and Val Venis playable characters as well as the Accelerator Boost, which allows players to unlock all unlockable content straight away and change superstar attributes.
- The second pack, the WWE Superstars Pack, includes Tensai, Ryback, Drew McIntyre, Yoshi Tatsu, AJ Lee and Natalya playable characters, a Championship Title Pack, which includes 10 championship belts from WWE, WCW, ECW and AWA, with the pack also including an alternative attire for The Undertaker free of charge.
- The final pack, You're Welcome in Five Different Languages Pack, includes Damien Sandow, Antonio Cesaro, The Usos (Jimmy and Jey), Brian Pillman and Chainsaw Charlie playable characters, as well as 20 new moves, with the pack also including Layla as a playable character free of charge.

== Marketing and release ==
On the May 28, 2012 episode of Raw SuperShow, during a segment featuring John Laurinaitis and CM Punk, Laurinaitis revealed the release date of the game would be October 30, 2012, while Punk revealed the official cover art for WWE '13. On June 19, THQ then confirmed that Mike Tyson will be available in the pre-orders of WWE '13. The full roster was revealed at SummerSlam Axxess. Days later, a trailer detailing the Attitude Era Mode was revealed.

On July 16, 2012, THQ announced that there would be a Collector's Edition of WWE '13, which is available by pre-order for the PlayStation 3 and Xbox 360 in North America, and Europe. Also, pre-orders for the PlayStation 3 included Disc 3 of "Stone Cold Steve Austin: The Bottom Line on the Most Popular Superstar of All Time". Pre-orders for the Xbox 360 included Disc 4.

During an interview with his friend Colt Cabana on the Art of Wrestling podcast released on October 24, 2012, CM Punk revealed that he was not WWE's choice to be on the cover of WWE '13 (according to Punk, Sheamus was WWE's choice for the cover) and that THQ had chosen him in spite of WWE's objection. CM Punk described the situation as follows (transcribed from podcast):

The company [WWE] still has the guys that they want in the limelight that they want to kind of shove down people's throats. And I've obviously come to terms with the fact that I will never be that guy…They just kept throwing, you know, a certain somebody at them [THQ]. No, no, this is the guy that we want. Not Punk…not Punk.

— CM Punk

Paul Heyman, who was involved in the development of the game, corroborated CM Punk's account in an interview with New York Post:

I've known since day one WWE does not consider CM Punk to be the poster boy for this company so this decision was made by THQ against WWE's wishes to put CM Punk on the cover.

— Paul Heyman

== Reception ==
Reception

Aggregate score
Aggregator	Score	
Aggregator	PS3	Xbox 360
Metacritic	76/100	78/100

Review scores
Publication	Score	
Publication	PS3	Xbox 360
Electronic Gaming Monthly		9/10
Eurogamer	9/10	
G4		3/5
Game Informer	9/10	9/10
GameRevolution		4/5
GameTrailers		8.5/10
IGN		8.4/10
Official Xbox Magazine (UK)		8/10
Official Xbox Magazine (US)		8/10

WWE '13 received "generally favorable" reviews from critics, according to review aggregator Metacritic.

IGN gave the game an 8.4 out of 10, praising the Attitude Era Mode, but panning the commentary, stating that aside from a few moments in Attitude Era Mode, "WWE '13 feels like you're listening to a couple of guys reading generic statements off of cue cards." They also dislike the new camera angles and audio samples of crowd sound saying that "they ruin the feel of an entire match".

Midlife Gamer gave the game 9/10, stating "The new Attitude Era is a welcome addition to the single-player campaign and the Universe mode is as good as always." and that "the sheer variety of wrestlers you are given to control during the entirety of the (Attitude Era) mode makes this a refreshing change to the series. They also stated that although WWE '13 has "the largest ever roster in a WWE game...a lot of the characters are various interpretations of the same person"

On November 16, 2012, THQ announced that it had received a nomination for Best Individual Sports Game at the 2012 Spike Video Game Awards. It lost to EA's SSX.

== See also ==
- List of licensed wrestling video games
- List of fighting games
- List of video games in the WWE 2K Games series
- WWE 2K
