= WWE SmackDown! Here Comes the Pain =

2003 professional wrestling video game

- North American cover art featuring Brock Lesnar, Torrie Wilson, Matt Hardy, Rey Mysterio, John Cena and The Undertaker.
- Developer: Yuke's
- Publishers: WW: THQ; JP: Yuke's
- Director: Taka Chihaya
- Producer: Norifumi Hara
- Designers: Yasushi Funakoshi; Sensho Mori; Hironobu Kama
- Programmer: Sumiaki Kawasaki
- Writer: Kenzy Nakamura
- Composer: Momo Michishita
- Series: SmackDown!
- Platform: PlayStation 2
- Release: NA: October 27, 2003; EU: November 7, 2003; JP: January 29, 2004
- Genre: Sports
- Modes: Single-player, multiplayer

WWE SmackDown! Here Comes the Pain (known as Exciting Pro Wrestling 5 in Japan) is a professional wrestling video game developed by Yuke's and published by THQ for PlayStation 2 in North America on October 27, 2003, Europe on November 7, 2003, and Japan on January 29, 2004. It is the sequel to WWE SmackDown! Shut Your Mouth and the fifth and final game in the WWE SmackDown! series based on World Wrestling Entertainment (WWE).

Here Comes the Pain received positive reviews. The game would be succeeded by WWE SmackDown! vs. Raw in 2004.

== Gameplay ==
The games introduced a more advanced and extensive grappling system, while still retaining the series' fast gameplay.

Alongside a new grappling system, body damage displays and submission meters (for both the person applying the move and the person breaking out of the move), as well as the ability to break the submission hold when grabbing the ropes, and individual character attributes that consisted of statistics (such as strength, endurance, and speed) were all introduced to the series for the first time. Here Comes the Pain also marks the first time the Elimination Chamber and the Bra and Panties Match would be featured in a wrestling game.

Alongside a playable roster of over 50 Superstars who were active members of the WWE roster at the time of the game's release, legends were introduced for the first time in the series, which included wrestlers such as Jimmy "Superfly" Snuka and "Rowdy" Roddy Piper, as well as former iterations of current wrestlers, such as The Undertaker with his original "Deadman" gimmick. It also marks the final time that The Rock and Stone Cold Steve Austin would appear in a WWE game as non-legends, and is the first WWE game to feature future mainstays John Cena, Batista, and Rey Mysterio as playable characters. It is also the first game to depict Kane without his mask.

Additional updates were also made to Season Mode, with decisions being made on a new menu screen in the locker room, while players could enter the General Manager's room to ask for title shots and brand switches, as well as having the opportunity to talk to various wrestlers appear backstage. There are multiple titles to go after depending on if the players go to SmackDown! or Raw.

== Development ==
Early beta versions of the game featured Jeff Hardy, Hulk Hogan (along with his alter-ego Mr. America and his 1980s appearance) and Ultimate Warrior. However, Hogan and Hardy were removed from the game when they left WWE, and Warrior was ultimately omitted due to legal issues. Data for other omitted wrestlers, including Al Snow, Spike Dudley, Billy Kidman, Billy Gunn, William Regal, Bradshaw, Molly Holly and 3-Minute Warning remains on the final disc, with none of them having any finished character models. The concept of having multiple versions of Hogan in one game was finally realized with his inclusion in the release of WWE SmackDown! vs. Raw 2006.

== Reception ==
Reception

Aggregate score
Aggregator	Score
Metacritic	85/100

Review scores
Publication	Score
Electronic Gaming Monthly	7.5/10
Eurogamer	9/10
Famitsu	29/40
Game Informer	8.5/10
GamePro	4/5
GameSpot	9/10
GameSpy	4/5
GameZone	9.2/10
IGN	9.1/10
Official U.S. PlayStation Magazine	3.5/5

WWE SmackDown! Here Comes the Pain received a "Platinum" sales award from the Entertainment and Leisure Software Publishers Association (ELSPA), indicating sales of at least 300,000 copies in the United Kingdom.

The game received "generally favorable" reviews from critics, according to review aggregator Metacritic.

IGN praised gameplay mechanics, graphics, career mode, and create-a-character feature, and called it one of the best games in the wrestler genre. GameSpot was also positive despite saying that it lacks an innovation. Eurogamer said that the game has a "superb" blend of traditional and wrestling-specific fight mechanics. GMR commended the game's submission moves due to its logical location-based damage system and said that the wrestlers are accurately presented.

Other reviews were more mixed. Official U.S. PlayStation Magazine commented that the game tried to accommodate both sides by combining quick action with the technical elements of wrestling, but that it almost succeeds in it. In Japan, Famitsu gave it a score of 29 out of 40.

=== Accolades ===
Distributor:	Category:	Result:
1st British Academy Video Games Awards	Sports Game	Nominated
2003 Spike Video Game Awards	Best Sports Game	Nominated
2003 Spike Video Game Awards	Best Fighting Game	Won
7th Annual Interactive Achievement Awards	Console Fighting Game of the Year	Nominated

== See also ==
- Rumble Roses - an all-female wrestling game by Konami that uses the same game engine.
