= WWE SmackDown vs. Raw 2011 =

2010 professional wrestling video game

- NTSC cover art featuring Big Show, John Cena and The Miz (Note: These three wrestlers are featured as the cover stars in the United States, Australia, New Zealand, Singapore, Hong Kong, Taiwan and India versions of the game. In all other regions, The Undertaker appears on the cover alongside two other wrestlers that vary on the region. In Europe and Japan, Randy Orton and Sheamus appear. For Canada, Canadian-hailing wrestlers Bret Hart and Edge appear. For Latin America and South Korea, Rey Mysterio and Triple H appear.)
- Developer: Yuke's
- Publisher: THQ
- Designers: Kenzy Nakamura; Naoto Ueno
- Writer: Justin Leeper
- Series: SmackDown vs. Raw
- Platforms: PlayStation 2 PlayStation 3 PlayStation Portable; Wii; PlayStation 4
- Release: NA: October 26, 2010; AU: October 28, 2010; EU: October 29, 2010; JP: February 3, 2011 (PS3, X360)
- Genre: Sports
- Modes: Single-player, multiplayer

WWE SmackDown vs. Raw 2011 is a professional wrestling video game developed by Yuke's and published by THQ for the PlayStation 2, PlayStation 3, PlayStation Portable, Xbox 360, and Wii systems. The game was released worldwide in October 2010, with the PS3 and Xbox 360 versions for Japan in February 2011.

The game is the twelfth overall installment in the series, the successor to SmackDown vs. Raw 2010, as well as the seventh and last game to be released under the SmackDown vs. Raw name, which is based on the WWE professional wrestling promotion and its Raw and SmackDown brands.

SmackDown vs. Raw 2011 was succeeded by WWE '12.

== Gameplay ==
John Cena, Randy Orton, Rey Mysterio, and Drew McIntyre in a TLC Match. The Tables, Ladders and Chairs match features new ways to use and break objects.

One of the main changes in the game is the incorporation of a new physics system that allows objects to be used more realistically, such as objects involved in the Tables, Ladders, and Chairs match. Tables now break differently depending on the impact placed upon them. Inside and outside the ring, ladders can now be rested onto the ring ropes and be broken in half. For the first time since the original WWE SmackDown! vs. Raw game, chairs can be thrown at the player's opponents.

The Hell in a Cell match was revamped with expanded cell walls, weapons underneath the ring, steel steps near the poles, and the removal of the cell door. In addition, new ways to exit the cell were introduced, such as barreling through the cage wall. This game was also the last to feature Batista and Shawn Michaels as non-legends or unlockables until the release of later installments of the game.

=== WWE Universe ===
The game's new "WWE Universe" builds storylines, and integrates cut scenes and rivalries between wrestlers based on the matches that are wrestled. These cut scenes appear randomly before, during, and after the match. The game features more than 100 cutscenes to push storylines, which can revolve around alliances, rivalries and titles, forward. The game reacts to the players actions and depending on the goal of the player's superstar, original or created, puts them in one of, or several, the top ten contenders lists for a specific title. However, one can only get into the contendership list depending on their rivalries, alliances, match types and most importantly, win–loss ratio.

=== Road to WrestleMania ===
Road to WrestleMania mode has been modified to include new features such as backstage roaming, mini-quests, and further interaction with other Superstars. Playable storylines involve Rey Mysterio, John Cena, Christian, and Chris Jericho. Along with that is the new storyline in which players choose Kofi Kingston, John Morrison, Dolph Ziggler, R-Truth, or a created superstar in a quest to end The Undertaker's undefeated WrestleMania Streak. Like previous iterations, the game features several storylines starting during the card leading to the Royal Rumble, a time period dubbed the Road to WrestleMania (WrestleMania XXVI).

=== Create modes ===
The Create A Superstar mode now includes pre-loaded attribute points for created superstars, while in Create A Finisher mode, a new finisher position is the "Corner", in which finishers can be created in corner position (Cannot be used during the Royal Rumble match). Also attributes such as speed and trajectory can now be modified by single increments rather than 25% increments. The number of available created finishers has been expanded to 130 as well. Online mode also returns – each new copy of the game contains an Online Pass allowing one user to play the game online for free. Players who rent or purchase the game used will obtain a trial of Online Pass.

A new feature called "Match Creator" allows players to create new match types. In addition, Story Designer mode now has new cutscenes, usable sound clips from announcers and wrestler entrance music, support for up to fifteen created superstars, 'branching' story paths depending on which character won the match and the ability to include championship belts in cutscenes and event triggers based on a wrestler reaching a certain state.

== Development ==
WWE SmackDown vs. Raw 2011 was first announced along with WWE All Stars at E3 in June 2010 by THQ. A playable demo was featured at E3 with Randy Orton, The Undertaker, Chris Jericho, and The Miz as playable characters.

Special editions of the game featuring The Undertaker, Bret Hart and Randy Orton were released in PAL regions, each offering exclusive in-game content, an art book and DVD relating to each wrestler. Various retailers offered in-game bonuses include a playable Bret Hart, The Undertaker's alternate Ministry of Darkness attire, three alternate outfits for Randy Orton and the WWE Tribute to the Troops arena.

Three downloadable content packs were released. The first pack, "Online Axxess" was available at release and added playable character Chris Masters, Halloween-themed attires for Kelly Kelly and Rey Mysterio and online multiplayer mode. The second pack was released in North America and United Kingdom on December 21, 2010. This pack contained the playable characters British Bulldog, Lex Luger, Layla and Nexus members Wade Barrett, David Otunga, and Justin Gabriel along with alternate attires for Shad Gaspard and Shawn Michaels and the NXT Arena. The third pack included alternate attires for John Cena, The Undertaker, Sheamus and CM Punk as well as the WCW Nitro Arena. THQ has offered players a package deal called "Fan Axxess" to purchase the last two content packs beforehand.

Bret Hart was made available as a downloadable character for the Xbox 360 and PlayStation 3 versions in January 2011. He had previously been excluded from THQ's "Fan Axxess" package.

== Reception ==
Reception

Aggregate scores
Aggregator	Score				
Aggregator	PS2	PS3	PSP	Wii	Xbox 360
GameRankings	80%	77.47%	60%	74%	76.84%
Metacritic	80/100	74/100	62/100	72/100	75/100

Review scores
Publication	Score				
Publication	PS2	PS3	PSP	Wii	Xbox 360
Game Informer	N/A	8/10	N/A	N/A	8/10
GameRevolution	N/A	B+	N/A	N/A	B+
GameSpot	N/A	7/10	N/A	N/A	7/10
GameTrailers	N/A	N/A	N/A	N/A	7/10
GameZone	N/A	4.5/10	N/A	6.5/10	4.5/10
Giant Bomb	N/A	N/A	N/A	N/A	2/5
IGN	8/10	8/10	N/A	7.5/10	8/10
Nintendo Power	N/A	N/A	N/A	7.5/10	N/A
Official Xbox Magazine (US)	N/A	N/A	N/A	N/A	6.5/10
PlayStation: The Official Magazine	N/A	6/10	N/A	N/A	N/A
The Daily Telegraph	N/A	7/10	N/A	N/A	7/10
The Guardian	N/A	N/A	N/A	N/A	4/5

The game was met with positive to mixed reception upon release. GameRankings and Metacritic gave it a score of 80% and 80 out of 100 for the PlayStation 2 version; 77.47% and 74 out of 100 for the PlayStation 3 version; 76.84% and 75 out of 100 for the Xbox 360 version; 74% and 72 out of 100 for the Wii version; and 60% and 62 out of 100 for the PSP version.

Greg Miller of IGN gave the PS3 and Xbox 360 versions of the game an eight out of ten. He praised the game's Universe Mode and the wrestler animations, but criticized the limitations of Road to WrestleMania mode and the inaccurate commentary. In addition, he stated that the grappling system could be frustrating at times. Miller gave the Wii version of the game a 7.5 out of ten, however. He mentioned the same criticisms from the PS3 and Xbox 360 versions, but also criticized the graphics. GameSpot's Chris Watters rated the PS3 and X360 versions seven out of ten, lauding the game's customization options, while finding fault with the game's collision detection and the lag during online multiplayer games. He also claimed that the series was starting to "show its age".

GameZone's William Haley criticized the PS3 and Xbox 360 versions for not progressing much beyond their predecessors, claiming that the game targeted the "lowest common denominator". He called the WWE Universe feature, online multiplayer mode and creation tools "compelling", but also wrote that "the foundation upon which they are built is so decrepit that it completely invalidates the meager value this game has to offer".

By September 2012, the game had sold 3.5 million copies.

== See also ==
- List of licensed wrestling video games
- List of fighting games
