= WWE SmackDown! Shut Your Mouth =

2002 professional wrestling video game

- NTSC cover art featuring Kurt Angle, Brock Lesnar, Triple H, Chris Jericho and Booker T (Note: The PAL-region cover art features The Rock and "Hollywood" Hulk Hogan.)
- Developer: Yuke's
- Publishers: WW: THQ; JP: Yuke's
- Director: Taka Chihaya
- Producers: Norifumi Hara; Nick Wlodyka; Sanders Keel
- Designers: Kenzy Nakamura; Osamu Hashimoto
- Programmer: Katsumi Nakagaki
- Artists: Taka Chihaya; Masamichi Ito
- Composer: Momo Michishita
- Series: SmackDown!
- Platform: PlayStation 2
- Release: NA: November 13, 2002; EU: November 15, 2002; JP: February 26, 2003
- Genre: Sports
- Modes: Single-player, multiplayer

WWE SmackDown! Shut Your Mouth (known as Exciting Pro Wrestling 4 in Japan) is a 2002 professional wrestling video game released for the PlayStation 2 by THQ and developed by Yuke's. It is the fourth game in the WWE SmackDown! video game series, based on the professional wrestling promotion World Wrestling Entertainment (WWE), and the sequel to WWF SmackDown! Just Bring It. It is also the first game in the series to be released under the "WWE" banner, and the first game that was released during the WWE Ruthless Aggression era. The game was released in North America on November 13, 2002, Europe on November 15, 2002, and Japan on February 26, 2003.

The game was succeeded by WWE SmackDown! Here Comes the Pain released in 2003.

== Gameplay ==
Season mode was lengthened to two in-game years and features the Brand Extension featuring Ric Flair's Raw and Vince McMahon's SmackDown!. For the first time, only WWE superstars could participate in Season mode. Players compete exclusively on the show they are drafted to for the first few months of year one, consisting of four Raw or SmackDown! events, plus a monthly pay-per-view (PPV) event. If the player's character is a created superstar, or if the original superstar has a rating lower than 60, they will instead begin their season on Sunday Night HEAT. Eventually, the player will be booked on the two major television shows, appearing on two Raw and two SmackDown! shows and the PPV event. One of the featured storylines is based on the WWE debut of the nWo of early 2002, which in-game, includes Hollywood Hulk Hogan, Kevin Nash, and X-Pac (replacing Scott Hall, who had been fired from WWE following the "Plane Ride from Hell" incident).

Like its predecessor Just Bring It, Shut Your Mouth's championships cannot be contended for in Exhibition mode and can only be defended in Season mode. All of the major titles at the time of the game’s development, with the exception of the WWE Women's Championship, are included in the game: WWE Undisputed, Intercontinental, European, Tag Team, Cruiserweight, and Hardcore championships. Various unlockables such as alternate attires for characters, extra movesets, and arenas can be unlocked throughout Season mode.

Televised and pay-per-view events are televised from the SmackDown! Arena, the exterior of which is based on the design of Madison Square Garden. Although Jim Ross announces a different city at the start of each event, the exteriors remain the same. Notable areas are a New York City Subway stop named SmackDown! Station, Times Square, and The World. The game features several arenas based on the various pay-per-views held by WWE in 2001 and 2002, in addition to the game’s original Armageddon arena (As an Armageddon event was not held in 2001). There are also arenas based on the Raw, SmackDown!, and Heat weekly shows. certain arenas, players could make their wrestlers scale the TitanTron and jump off of it. For example, a player could have Rob Van Dam climb to the top of the fist in the SmackDown! arena, and perform a Five Star Frog Splash. In addition, The Undertaker's signature motorcycle could be ridden in some matches and backstage areas. Create-A-Superstar mode gives the player freedom to manipulate any part of the superstar's body. It also offers over 58 move sets from a combination of superstars in WWE not featured in the game or working in different promotions.

This is the first WWE game to feature superstars on different brands, Raw and SmackDown!. In this game, all the superstars, including champions are eligible to be drafted on both brands, with the exception of the WWE Undisputed Champion, who is available on both brands, so long as he is the reigning champion. This also marks the first WWE video game appearances of Billy Kidman, Brock Lesnar, Chuck Palumbo, Diamond Dallas Page, Jazz, Maven, Randy Orton, Rico, Stacy Keibler, Lance Storm, Kevin Nash and Torrie Wilson.

== Development ==
Shut Your Mouth received a major graphical overhaul during its development, with superstar models being updated to include realistic facial features. Fully animated entrances for each character are also featured, with the superstar's signature entrance video playing on the TitanTron, while their respective themes playing in the arena. The title belts are also displayed in the entrances in realistic fashion (e.g. The Rock carrying the title belt to the ring and raising it above his head).

For superstar entrances, most of the themes used in the televised and house shows were incorporated into the game. Along with the in-house music from Jim Johnston, remakes of Johnston's originals from bands such as Breaking Point (for Rob Van Dam), Boy Hits Car (for Lita), Cypress Hill (for Tazz), Our Lady Peace (for Chris Benoit), and Saliva (for The Dudley Boyz) were also featured. However, Maven, Stacy Keibler, Tajiri, Randy Orton, and The Hardy Boyz do not have their correct themes (although an instrumental version of Maven's actual entrance theme is included on the game disc). Jim Ross and Jerry Lawler provide sporadic play-by-play commentary, while ring announcer Howard Finkel provided his voice for match introductions and superstar entrances.

== Reception ==
Reception

Aggregate score
Aggregator	Score
Metacritic	82/100

Review scores
Publication	Score
Electronic Gaming Monthly	7.33/10
Eurogamer	8/10
Game Informer	7.5/10
GamePro	4/5
GameSpot	8.9/10
GameSpy	4.5/5
GameZone	8.8/10
IGN	8.2/10
Official U.S. PlayStation Magazine	2.5/5
X-Play	4/5
BBC Sport	87%

By July 2006, the game had sold 1.1 million copies and earned $50 million in the United States. Next Generation ranked it as the 44th highest-selling game launched for the PlayStation 2, Xbox or GameCube between January 2003 and July 2006 in that country. Combined console sales of WWE games released in the 2000s reached 8 million units in the United States by July 2006. It also received a "Platinum" sales award from the Entertainment and Leisure Software Publishers Association (ELSPA), indicating sales of at least 300,000 copies in the United Kingdom.

The game received "generally favorable" reviews, according to video game review aggregator Metacritic. GameSpot named it the second-best PlayStation 2 game of November 2002. It was a runner-up for GameSpot's annual "Best Graphics (Technical) on PlayStation 2" award, which went to Ratchet & Clank.
