= WWE SmackDown vs. Raw 2010 =

2009 professional wrestling video game

- Cover art featuring Edge, The Undertaker, John Cena, Randy Orton and Rey Mysterio
- Developers: Yuke's; Tose (Nintendo DS)
- Publisher: THQ
- Series: SmackDown vs. Raw
- Platforms: Nintendo DS; PlayStation 2; PlayStation 3; PlayStation Portable; Wii; Xbox 360; iOS
- Release: Nintendo DS, PlayStation 2, PlayStation 3, PlayStation Portable, Wii & Xbox 360: NA: October 20, 2009; AU: October 22, 2009; EU: October 23, 2009; JP: January 28, 2010 (PS3, X360); iOS: WW: December 23, 2009
- Genre: Sports
- Modes: Single-player, multiplayer

WWE SmackDown vs. Raw 2010 (also known as WWE SmackDown vs. Raw 2010 featuring ECW) is a professional wrestling video game developed by Yuke's and published by THQ for the PlayStation 2, PlayStation 3, PlayStation Portable, Wii, Nintendo DS, Xbox 360, and iOS. It was released worldwide in October 2009, with the PS3 and Xbox 360 versions for Japan in January 2010. TOSE oversaw the development for the Nintendo DS version, which was the last installment to be released for the handheld. 2010 was also the first installment to be released as an iPhone app, launching on App Store on December 23 the same year.

SmackDown vs. Raw 2010 is the eleventh overall installment in the video game series based on the professional wrestling promotion World Wrestling Entertainment (WWE), the successor to 2008's SmackDown vs. Raw 2009, and the sixth game under the SmackDown vs. Raw name; named after the promotion's SmackDown and Raw brands. It was also the third and final game to feature the promotion's ECW brand before its dissolution in February 2010.

The game adds several new features focused around customization, such as a Story Designer that allows players to create their own storylines, "Road to Wrestlemania", an expansion on the "Create-a-Finisher" mode to include aerial techniques. New additions exclusive to the PlayStation 3 and Xbox 360 versions are the customization of attire colors in a mode called "Superstar Threads", a revamped "Create-a-Superstar" mode, and a paint tool for creating logos to use on their created characters.

The game was succeeded by WWE SmackDown vs. Raw 2011.

== Gameplay ==
=== Create modes ===
A screenshot of the game's new WWE Story Designer mode, here demonstrating the mode's scenario design function

"Create modes" have received a complete overhaul from past years' editions. The game introduces the "WWE Story Designer" mode, where the player can now design storylines for WWE's weekly shows and pay-per-view events with storylines, scenarios, and matches of their creations using a variety of preset options. There are over 100 different animations and 25 different locations to design each scene. Subtitles can be written in through a controller or through a USB keyboard. The player can now control how long the storylines goes on, how many WWE Superstars or Divas are involved, and what takes place in the storylines. The match-making feature allows the player to set a match type, set a stipulation, and set any winning conditions. In addition to using created superstars, the player may also integrate actual WWE superstars and Divas into their created storylines, scenarios, or matches. On the Xbox 360 and PlayStation 3 versions, each storyline can feature up to 500 segments including 450 matches and 50 scenarios, while the Wii, PlayStation 2 and PlayStation Portable versions have a limit of 55 segments. Created wrestlers are limited in the PS3 and Xbox 360 versions to ten appearances in the mode.

The "Create-a-Superstar" mode in the Xbox 360 and PlayStation 3 versions now feature three-dimensional apparel that moves realistically with each movement. A new point system has been implemented where each item is given a point value and the player is able to attach up to 48 points of items. For each created wrestler, the player can create up to three alternate attires for them. The mode also features an additional "Paint Tool" in which players can create their own design that they can use as to use as a logo or a tattoo for their created wrestler. The Xbox 360 and the PlayStation 3 versions also introduce a new mode called "Superstar Threads", in which the player can create three alternate attires for existing wrestlers in the game by customizing the colors of their attire. This mode is not available for the PS2, PSP and Wii versions of the game.

Unlocking abilities for a created superstar has been made easier, as players no longer have to assign points or take the created superstar into a career mode specifically to improve their attributes. Instead, attributes can be increased in all modes of the game, including regular exhibition matches as well as the "Create-a-Superstar" story in the "Road to Wrestlemania" mode. The maximum threshold is extended by 5 points in one or two categories, depending on how the player performed in the match. Available attribute points are determined by what happens in each match. There are 21 unlockable abilities, which are easier to unlock that in previous years. This time, players are required to build up certain attributes to unlock the option of certain skills. These can be assigned in "Create-A-Moveset" mode, and include new skills such as "Fired Up", "Pull Back Attacks", "Exploder Turnbuckle Attack", and others. "Create-a-Finisher" has also been reworked, with the mode expanded to include aerial techniques. The player is also able to adjust the jumping trajectory and speed of the maneuver.

The Xbox 360 and PlayStation 3 versions are able to share created wrestlers, moves, and shows online with other players. The player can also rate other creations online in terms of quality. A new addition to the previous year's "Highlight Reel" mode is a compilation of the match's highlights will be listed after each match. The player can subsequently choose to watch or save any of these highlights. Players are also able to convert their "Highlight Reels" into entrance movies for their created wrestlers. The PlayStation 3 versions enables uploads of "Highlight Reels" directly onto YouTube.

A new addition to the game this year is the "WWE Rivals" option, which allows the player to set superstars' allies and enemies. The feature can be used to the player's advantage or disadvantage in exhibition matches with the interference option on. If a superstar is set as an enemy, then that enemy may appear during the peak of a match. The enemy has a number of choices including standing by the ring and breaking up pinfalls, using his or her finisher, or coming in with a weapon. Allies work in a similar fashion. The intensity of the rivalry or alliance can be changed by changing the position of where the certain superstars are slotted.

=== Match gameplay ===
SmackDown vs. Raw 2010 features new additions to match gameplay. A new feature that has been added is the "THQ Training Facility", a tutorial option. The player is able to choose a superstar, their non-player character opponent (or they may choose to play with another player), the match type, and the game or match settings. During the match, various pop-ups will appear with different instructions on how to perform actions, such as the grapples or maneuvers available to be performed.

For the first time since WWE SmackDown vs. Raw 2007, the game features four strong grapples, with players now also able to switch between each grapples. Other new move positions include moves involving superstars standing on the ring's apron and a change in ground grapples with side grapple moves and separate moves for opponents depending whether they are on their stomach or back. All diving attacks were reanimated to look more realistic.

The game features a revamped HUD that cuts down the on-screen information. The momentum meter now appears as a small halo underneath each superstar, while HUD icons and information relevant to the match are displayed around the superstar. On-screen body damage meters are now replaced by visual cues from superstars indicating where they are damaged. The game also adopts the "pinfall kickout mechanism" used in the WWE Legends of WrestleMania video game, in which the player can either hold a face button or button mash to fill up a meter for kicking out of a pinfall attempt. A new reversal system replaces the old two-button system from previous games. The new single-button reversal system makes timing a competitive skill, with the player given only one chance to press the reversal key when the icon appears.

One of the new minigames in the revamped Royal Rumble match, featuring Randy Orton and John Cena

New match stipulations include the Championship Scramble match that was first introduced at WWE's 2008 Unforgiven event. Another new match type is the mixed tag team match.

The Royal Rumble match has been revamped. As well as eliminating opponents off the apron like in the previous games, the player can now eliminate other wrestlers in the match by using the ring ropes and the turnbuckles. Eliminations in the match are done either by mini-games in these areas or by the player using finishing moves to eliminate other wrestlers. Finishing moves can also save wrestlers from elimination. On the home consoles version, the number of different backstage areas in the Backstage Brawl match has been increased to five areas, or 14 backstage areas in the DS version. With the exception of the First Blood match, the Hell in a Cell match, the Elimination Chamber match and the Royal Rumble match, Divas are now able to participate in all other the match types However, apart from the mixed tag team match, intergender match-ups are no longer allowed.

==== Nintendo versions ====
The Wii version of the game has also been reworked, with the motion gameplay and control scheme having been modified similar to that of the PlayStation 3 and Xbox 360 versions. The player now has more control options, including the use of the GameCube controller, Wii Remote, and the Wii Classic Controller. The Wii version also includes many of the features found on the PlayStation 3 and Xbox 360 versions, including the create-a-finisher mode for the first time, but the game does not include online support.

The DS version introduces the Ambulance match for the first time. . Gameplay can now be seen from an elevated camera, in addition, the maneuvers are now also controlled by using the device's buttons instead of touch screen. 2010 features an increase in speed, unlike past games.

A new feature to the DS version is a collectible card system. The player is able to collect cards that feature power-ups that may be activated in the ring such as calling in a wrestler to interfere in the match, or that feature unlockables such as create-a-superstar parts and match types.

=== Game modes ===
The Road to WrestleMania features six new stories starring various WWE wrestlers. The mode introduces a Diva-based story involving Mickie James, and a story specifically for one of the player's created wrestlers. This year's co-operative storyline, titled "Brand Warfare", features Triple H and John Cena. The remaining three stories involve Edge, Shawn Michaels, and Randy Orton respectively. Road to WrestleMania also includes storylines that branch out through interactive cutscenes before and during WrestleMania 25.

The DS version also features a revamped story mode in which the player will participate in various storylines. Along the way, the player has to compete in matches, in addition to being able to improve a created wrestler's statistics, nursing the wounds suffered by the player's wrestler, or visiting WWE Chairman Mr. McMahon's office.

== Roster ==
Stone Cold Steve Austin character model

WWE SmackDown vs. Raw 2010 features 67 in-game superstars and divas on each console, with the debuts of 13 new superstars to the series. The Nintendo DS version features 30 superstars, and the Mobile version features 11 superstars. The majority of the roster was revealed on September 16 during a live webcast hosted by GameSpot, featuring The Miz, Eve Torres and Howard Finkel as guests. The roster in the 2010 edition is split into six classifications: Raw, SmackDown, ECW, WCW, legends, and free agents. Like the previous game, players can choose to change the character's classification in a roster editor called Superstar Management.

An extra character, Stone Cold Steve Austin, was also featured as downloadable content on the PlayStation 3 and Xbox 360 versions. The character could be downloaded by a code obtained when purchased at GameStop, EB Games or Game.

== Development ==
The first announcement for the game was made in May 2009, when during an earnings call with investors, THQ declared their intent to release the next installment in the series later in the year. The game's development was officially revealed at E3 2009 by WWE, Yuke's, and THQ.

For the first time in the series, WWE SmackDown vs. Raw 2010 implements the Havok game engine. The software was used in the game to improve collision detection. In a podcast with IGN, THQ game designer Bryan Williams said Havok was slowly implemented into the series with this year's game only focusing on small areas such as collisions between wrestlers and the ring ropes as well as collisions between themselves, with later installments incorporating Havok more. Consideration for the use of Havok in the series was previously announced by THQ in March 2009 during Havok's presentation at the Game Developers Conference in Austin, Texas.

The game also saw some graphical improvements within the series, with blood from the cuts on wrestlers' heads now smearing on any wrestlers that contact the wound. Wrestler's chests will also turn red after taking numerous chops.

=== Game developers ===
Aaron Lambert, animator
Paul Alexiou, visual effects artist
Robert G. Goodwin, cinematography, and also held this role for the SmackDown vs. Raw 2011 version too.
Anthony Passaniti, cinematography / animator
Wyatt Lavasseur, animator
Tyrone Evans Clark, 3D artist
Trevor Stafford, musician, band member of Adelitas Way.
Cory Ledesma, game director (Senior Creative Manager)
Emma Anzai, musician, band member of You're Going Down.
Troy Reynolds, Studio Lead: House of Moves
Tatsuya Watanabe, game designer
Jonathan Okui, assistant director
Cy Platt, assistant cutscene director, and voice actor for the character John Cena.
Justin Leeper, cutscene director / writer, and also wrote for SmackDown vs. Raw 2011.
Raymond Padilla, screenplay
Ian Morris, screenplay

=== Soundtrack ===
The game's soundtrack features eight licensed songs from Adelitas Way, Lions, Lynyrd Skynyrd, The Parlor Mob, Sick Puppies, Skillet and Trivium. Several songs have been used by WWE as theme songs for their PPVs ("You're Going Down" for Extreme Rules, "Still Unbroken" for Breaking Point, "Monster" for Hell in a Cell (2009), and "Hero" for the 2010 Royal Rumble) and shows ("Invincible", which was the theme song to WWE Superstars).

Artist	Song
Lions	"Start Movin'"
Lynyrd Skynyrd	"Still Unbroken"
The Parlor Mob	"Hard Times"
Sick Puppies	"You're Going Down"
Trivium	"Down From The Sky"
Adelitas Way	"Invincible"
Skillet	"Hero"
Skillet	"Monster"

=== Marketing and release ===
The game was promoted under the tagline "It's Your World Now", referring to the new customization features available to the player. The first video of gameplay footage was revealed on the August 11 edition of Late Night with Jimmy Fallon during an interview with wrestler Triple H, showing a match between Triple H and a created Jimmy Fallon.

A trailer announcing and promoting the game's new customization features was released on August 20 at GameSpot. This was a change from the previous years of the series in which features were announced earlier in a month like April. The reasoning for this was to build up anticipation and excitement in a shorter period with more information about the game, as well as preventing any overlap with the promotion over WWE Legends of WrestleMania, a video game that was also developed by Yuke's.

A television commercial for the game was later released in October, starring Kelly Kelly, Kofi Kingston, and John Cena, and featuring the song "Step Up (I'm On It)" by Maylene & The Sons of Disaster.

The game was featured on the No. 18 & the No.20 cars of Kyle Busch & Joey Logano at the Nationwide Series Race at Texas.

Certain stores also featured special bonuses bundled with the game when pre-ordered. GameStop, EB Games and Game gave away codes that would enable the player to download a Stone Cold Steve Austin character for free. Other stores gave away cheat codes to unlock certain superstars and arenas such as The Rock when purchased at Play.com, and two backstage areas, Vince McMahon's office, and the Dirt Sheet studio, if the game was preordered at Amazon.co.uk. If the game was preordered at HMV, players got a free Rey Mysterio DVD.

The game was originally slated to have an American release date of November 10, 2009, but the release date was subsequently moved forward to October 20. A playable demo for the game was made available for attendees of WWE's SummerSlam Axxess fan convention on August 22 and 23. Unlike previous years, there was not a wide release of the demo.

== Reception ==
Reception

Aggregate score
Aggregator	Score						
Aggregator	DS	iOS	PS2	PS3	PSP	Wii	Xbox 360
Metacritic	75/100	42/100	N/A	81/100	N/A	78/100	80/100

Review scores
Publication	Score						
Publication	DS	iOS	PS2	PS3	PSP	Wii	Xbox 360
Game Informer	N/A	N/A	N/A	8.25/10	N/A	N/A	8.25/10
GamePro	N/A	N/A	N/A	4.5/5	N/A	N/A	4.5/5
GameRevolution	N/A	N/A	N/A	B	N/A	N/A	B
GameSpot	N/A	N/A	N/A	7.5/10	N/A	7/10	7.5/10
GameSpy	N/A	N/A	N/A	3.5/5	N/A	N/A	3.5/5
GameTrailers	N/A	N/A	N/A	N/A	N/A	N/A	8.3/10
GameZone	N/A	N/A	N/A	N/A	N/A	N/A	8.1/10
Giant Bomb	N/A	N/A	N/A	3/5	N/A	N/A	3/5
IGN	7.9/10	2.5/10	8/10	8.5/10	7.2/10	8/10	8.5/10
Official Nintendo Magazine	N/A	N/A	N/A	N/A	N/A	83%	N/A
Official Xbox Magazine (US)	N/A	N/A	N/A	N/A	N/A	N/A	7.5/10
TouchArcade	N/A	3/5	N/A	N/A	N/A	N/A	N/A
The A.V. Club	N/A	N/A	N/A	N/A	N/A	N/A	B+
The Daily Telegraph	N/A	N/A	N/A	7/10	N/A	N/A	7/10

WWE SmackDown vs. Raw 2010 was met with mostly positive reception from numerous video game publications. The majority of positive reviews were for the Xbox 360 and PlayStation 3 versions. GamesMaster magazine rated the Xbox 360 version with 90%, giving it the publication's GamesMaster Gold Award, calling it a "true return to form for the evergreen series". Oliver Hurley from the PlayStation Official Magazine rated the PS3 version an 8 out of 10, mentioning that while gameplay was "much the same as ever" and that it lacked the "punching power" seen in UFC 2009 Undisputed (also produced by THQ and Yuke's), the game's create modes "makes this the deepest, most playable WWE game yet". IGN reviewer Greg Miller rated both the Xbox 360 and PS3 versions an 8.5 out of 10, mentioning that while the game "still stumbles" in areas and that it "might not be the greatest wrestling game of all time", the improvement in gameplay, presentation and create modes makes this wrestling game "the best the world's seen in years". Both 1UP.com and VideoGamer.com declared WWE SmackDown vs. Raw 2010 the best game in the series to date, with the former calling it "ultimate wrestling gamer's sandbox".

The game has also received some criticism. Game Revolution's Nick Tan questioned the game's tagline with restrictions in the Story Designer and create-a-superstar modes, and instead declared it as "Your World Now. Some Restrictions Apply". The UK version of Official Xbox Magazine was heavily critical of the game, rating it 6 out of 10 and criticizing the lack of any progress made towards the game's engine as well as the loading times.

As well as the Xbox 360 and PS3 versions, IGN also reviewed the PS2, PSP, Wii, Nintendo DS and iPhone versions. Greg Miller gave the PS2 and Wii versions 8 out 10, praising the gameplay and additional content featured in the PS2 version as well as calling the Wii version the best game of the series on that console. However, Miller criticized the lack of online support on the Wii and commented that the tweaks to the game did not "play as well on the PSP as they played on the PS3" and that the "whole experience still feels stiff". Reviewer Mark Bozon also commented on the Wii version, calling the switch to buttons a "win/lose situation", with the sacrifice of the Wii-exclusive features in the previous two games has helped the core game get stronger, of which he approved. On the Nintendo DS version, Bozon mentioned that while the game was sluggish in gameplay and that superstars movesets were lacking in areas, the switch to button controls "paid off" and it was "closer to the No Mercy system than ever before". Miller gave the iPhone version a score of 2.5 out of 10 and called it "a pretty shallow experience" filled with basic menus and "ugly" visuals.

== See also ==
- List of fighting games
- List of licensed wrestling video games
- List of video games in the WWE Games series
