= WWE SmackDown! vs. Raw 2006 =

2005 professional wrestling video game

- Cover art featuring Batista and John Cena
- Developer: Yuke's
- Publishers: WW: THQ; JP: Yuke's
- Directors: Dylan Miklashek; Nick Wlodyka
- Producer: Hiromi Furuta
- Designers: Kentaro Arai; Kenzy Nakamura; Cory Ledesma; Devin Knudsen
- Programmers: Tomoyuki Ishige; Katsumi Nakagaki
- Writer: Bryan Stratton
- Series: SmackDown vs. Raw
- Platforms: PlayStation 2; PlayStation Portable
- Release: PlayStation 2: EU: November 11, 2005; NA: November 14, 2005; JP: February 2, 2006; PlayStation Portable: US: December 13, 2005; EU: December 16, 2005; JP: October 12, 2006
- Genre: Sports (fighting)
- Modes: Single-player, multiplayer

WWE SmackDown! vs. Raw 2006 (also known as Exciting Pro Wrestling 7 in Japan) is a professional wrestling video game developed by Yuke's and published by THQ that was released on the PlayStation 2 in Europe on November 11, 2005, North America on November 14, 2005, and Japan on February 2, 2006, and the PlayStation Portable in the United States on December 13, 2005, Europe on December 16, 2005, and Japan on October 12, 2006. It is part of the WWE SmackDown vs. Raw video game series based on the professional wrestling promotion World Wrestling Entertainment (WWE), and is the successor to the 2004 game of the same name. SmackDown! vs. Raw 2006 was also the first game in the series to be released on PlayStation Portable and the last game in the SmackDown!/SmackDown! vs. Raw series that was PlayStation exclusive.

The main focus of SmackDown! vs. Raw 2006 is to bring more realism and authenticity to the series with many new features, breaking away from the arcade-like gameplay of earlier installments. The game sees the additions of the new Buried Alive and Fulfill Your Fantasy matches, and the inclusion of two new modes in General Manager and Create-An-Entrance.

SmackDown! vs. Raw 2006 went on to become best selling game for the PlayStation 2 console out of the entire series. A steelbook version of the game was released exclusively in Australia. The game was succeeded by WWE SmackDown vs. Raw 2007.

== Gameplay ==
=== Match gameplay ===
A new momentum bar was introduced to determine the flow of the match, replacing the old clean/dirty and SmackDown! meters. If the player chooses their wrestler to fight clean, he/she will be portrayed as a face. If they choose to fight dirty, he/she will be portrayed as a heel. The player also has to keep an eye on their stamina bar, which drains as the wrestler fights; the more elaborate the offense, the more tired the wrestler will be. The player must regenerate their stamina bar to prevent becoming completely exhausted and unable to perform. However, this is an optional feature and can be easily removed in the game's options menu. Each character also has a new stamina attribute, meaning those with a low stamina rating will tire out more easily. Also included is a new Hardcore attribute, allowing those rated high to inflict more damage to their opponent with weapons.

Grapples have been vastly improved, with each character having more specialized grapple types than the previous game's unchangeable group of four grapples. Each character has choice of three out of seven grapples: Power, Speed, Technical, Brawler, Martial Arts, Luchadore, and Old School. Each character also has a Clean/Dirty grapple category and a Submission grapple category, bringing the total number of grapples to five. A new powerful version of the Irish whip has been included, giving more offense to the opponent, but at the price of draining more stamina.

The game includes The Great American Bash 2004, Vengeance 2004, SummerSlam 2004, Unforgiven 2004, No Mercy 2004, Taboo Tuesday 2004, Survivor Series 2004, Armageddon 2004, New Year's Revolution 2005, Royal Rumble 2005, No Way Out 2005, WrestleMania 21, Backlash 2005, Judgment Day 2005, and ECW One Night Stand 2005 PPV arenas, as well as the WrestleMania IX arena. There are also arenas based on each WWE television show (Raw, SmackDown!, Heat, and Velocity).

The arena crowd has also been graphically improved, with fully 3D characters replacing the mixture of 3D and 2D characters seen in the previous games.

=== Roster ===
WWE SmackDown! vs. Raw 2006 features the video game debuts of 20 superstars, as well as the returns of Hulk Hogan (in his 1980s, nWo "Hollywood", and 2000s versions) and Stone Cold Steve Austin; both men had been left out from the previous game (and in Hogan's case, WWE SmackDown! Here Comes the Pain) due to their respective sabbaticals from the company.

=== Match types ===
WWE SmackDown! vs. Raw 2006 includes an improved steel cage match, now allowing the player to escape through the cage's door. The Bra and Panties match has been replaced by a Fulfill Your Fantasy match, which is based on the costume-based diva match that occurred at the Taboo Tuesday pay-per-view event. Unlike the real event which is more battle royal–based, this version involves divas stripping their opponents to their bra and panties, spanking each other and hitting each other with pillows instead. In addition, in Exhibition and in General Manager mode, this match can only take place in the SummerSlam arena.

The Buried Alive match, a feature requested by players for several years, finally makes its debut. The gameplay of the "Buried Alive" match is actually more reminiscent of a heavily improved casket match from WWF SmackDown! 2: Know Your Role, in that the player had to trap their opponent in a casket to show a cut scene of the burial. Backstage fights are also improved and now include random people (referees, officials, and WWE personnel), who can be interacted with. In total, 100 different match types are available.

=== Game modes ===
The series' trademark Season mode lasts for two in-game years, one for the Raw brand and one for the SmackDown! brand. The objective of the mode is to win both brands' two main championships, the WWE Championship (Raw) and the World Heavyweight Championship (SmackDown!). The mode features 100 different motion-captured cinematic cut scenes, real-time storytelling, and improved voice acting. Players have a choice of five original voices for created superstars. A new 3D customizable locker room is also included.

In contrast to the game's predecessor, some of the in-game legends also have voice-overs and are made playable in Season mode. In an interview, THQ designer Bryan Williams confirmed that only 32 superstars (which included Stone Cold Steve Austin, Mankind, and Hulk Hogan) could be used in season mode. Some of the standard characters in the game cannot be used in Season mode. These wrestlers include Steven Richards, Ric Flair, and Eugene.

General Manager mode, which could be compared to the Extreme Warfare games and Final Fire Pro Wrestling's Management of the Ring mode, is included for the first time. In this mode, the player takes the role of General Manager for either the SmackDown! or Raw brand. Players begin by picking one of the two brands, followed by a choice of simulating or participating in a draft, where a player can pick a total of 20 Superstars. The player then allocates the championships before beginning the season. This mode goes into depth, with e-mail capabilities, the ability to book matches and statistics of how the fans reacted to the show, among other features. When WrestleMania rolls around, the General Manager of the Year is awarded, along with some unlockable features.

As in the previous game, online play is available for those with a Sony Network Adapter. The title belts (including Create-A-Belt creations) can be defended online via a "virtual WWE Championship" with career leader boards and a permanent ID system that tracks all user stats. Players are also able to trade wrestlers created in the Create-A-Superstar mode with each other online. All arenas are also available for online play, including the unlockable WrestleMania IX Arena.

=== Create modes ===
The game sports a variety of create modes. Create-A-Belt is a returning feature, with players now able to create Tag Team belts. Along with the created belts is the inclusion of title belts used in WWE during 2005, the WWE, World Heavyweight, Intercontinental, United States, WWE Tag Team, World Tag Team, Women's, and Cruiserweight championships. Ted DiBiase's Million Dollar Championship and the WWE Hardcore Championship can also be won and defended in the game. The game also allows the player to defend and challenge for any of the titles in the game in Exhibition mode, a feature which was missing in previous games (after Smackdown 2: Know Your Role).

The Create-A-Superstar mode is much the same as the previous installments in this series. SmackDown! vs. Raw 2006 adds a few new features, such as new items in the makeup category to give the player's created superstar more realistic facial features (such as wrinkles, a cleft chin, acne, and scars). Also included are new shirts and pants, which, while unchangeable in color, look more realistic (as opposed to the "painted on" look of shirts from previous games).

The Create-A-Move-Set mode, removed a lot of moves but added some new ones.

The Create-A-Stable mode has five pre-made stables such as La Résistance. This mode gives players a chance to make wrestler groups of 2-5 wrestlers, give a name to the stable, create an entrance (but not as advanced as in the Create-An-Entrance mode) for the stable, and customize their teamwork attributes, deciding how well they perform as a team in the ring.

The game also includes a new Create-An-Entrance mode, allowing the player to customize a wrestler's entrance, down to details such as pyrotechnics, arena lighting, and camera angles. The one-minute limit for all entrances that was enforced in previous games is now abolished. However, it received some criticism in comparison to sister game WWE Day of Reckoning 2 which had more options, no loading times, and was easier to use.

=== PlayStation Portable exclusive features ===
For the first time in the SmackDown! series, a game is also available on the PlayStation Portable (PSP). Although it is very similar to the PS2 version, there are special features that are exclusive to this version that the PS2 version did not bear. Because of this, to unlock the full features of each game, USB connectivity between the PS2 and PSP is needed.

Jake "The Snake" Roberts is an exclusive PSP Legend and can only be played in the PS2 version by connecting the PSP to the PS2. However, before the PSP game was released, cheat devices were discovered that allowed Roberts to be unlocked. Other notable differences between the PS2 and PSP versions include the lack of in-ring commentary and the inclusion of voiceovers from the more popular wrestlers. The only major problem seen by most gamers were the game's loading times, which were described as "abysmally long" by GameSpy. They were so long that there was a warning about the load times when a created superstar is chosen for a match.

The PSP version includes some features that were not included in the PS2 version. These features include three exclusive minigames that are playable from the start. All of these minigames offer single-player and multiplayer modes. In multiplayer mode, players can make use of PSP's Wi-Fi functionality. Each mode allows up to four players to join in and play over a local connection.

The first minigame, WWE Game Show, tests the knowledge of wrestling fans by offering 500 multi-layered wrestling questions. The WWE Game Show covers every wrestling topic imaginable including costumes, trends, music, finishers, styles, history, feuds, and more. Most questions include excerpts of songs and have players guess the tune or players are shown a video clip and must guess the match the clip is from. The questions range from easy to extremely difficult. Other minigames include a poker game and Eugene's airplane game in which the player navigates Eugene around the ring in the fastest time.

== Reception ==
Reception

Aggregate score
Aggregator	Score	
Aggregator	PS2	PSP
Metacritic	84/100	81/100

Review scores
Publication	Score	
Publication	PS2	PSP
Electronic Gaming Monthly	7.17/10	N/A
Eurogamer	7/10	8/10
Famitsu	31/40	N/A
Game Informer	8.75/10	8/10
GamePro	2.5/5	3.5/5
GameRevolution	B+	B
GameSpot	8.9/10	8.5/10
GameSpy	4.5/5	4/5
GameTrailers	8.5/10	N/A
GameZone	9.3/10	8.9/10
IGN	9.2/10	8.7/10
Official U.S. PlayStation Magazine	3/5	4/5
Detroit Free Press	4/4	N/A

The game received "generally favorable" reviews on both platforms, according to review aggregator Metacritic.

The game was praised by some critics for its depth of content. A GameSpot reviewer mentioned that the large number of content makes it an easy choice for any wrestling enthusiast, and called it the best wrestling game available for the system. Comparisons with the game and the highly acclaimed Nintendo 64 game WWF No Mercy were made, with some reviewers putting the game on par with No Mercy. An IGN reviewer commented that "there's no other wrestling game since No Mercy that offers this much replay, value, or depth". In Japan, Famitsu gave the PlayStation 2 version a score of three eights and one seven for a total of 31 out of 40.

However, there were some complaints for the game's limitations of game modes. Critics such as X-Play's reviewer felt that the General Manager mode "does not go as far as it should--no underhanded options--but it's a great start", while an eToychest reviewer said that the Season mode is a welcome addition in the gameplay, but noticed the lack of replayability due to the limit placed on possible story arcs.

From the game's release up until December 2006, the game sold 3.3 million copies. The PlayStation 2 version received a "Platinum" sales award from the Entertainment and Leisure Software Publishers Association (ELSPA), indicating sales of at least 300,000 copies in the United Kingdom. In October 2006, the game was added to Sony's Greatest Hits collection.

The Academy of Interactive Arts & Sciences nominated WWE SmackDown! vs. Raw 2006 for "Fighting Game of the Year" at the 10th Annual Interactive Achievement Awards.

== See also ==
- List of licensed wrestling video games
- List of fighting games
- List of video games in the WWE 2K Games series
