= WWE SmackDown vs. Raw 2008 =

2007 professional wrestling video game

- Cover art featuring John Cena, The Undertaker and Bobby Lashley
- Developers: Yuke's; Amaze Entertainment (DS)
- Publisher: THQ
- Director: Toshihiko Kitazawa
- Designers: Hidekazu Tanaka; Naoto Ueno
- Programmers: Kouji Hayashi; Reiji Sato; Tsukasa Kato; Youichi Sada
- Writers: Bryan Stratton; Justin Leeper; Jim Comeau; Jonathan London
- Series: SmackDown vs. Raw
- Platforms: PlayStation 2; Wii; Xbox 360; PlayStation 3; PlayStation Portable; Nintendo DS
- Release: Nintendo DS, PlayStation 2, Wii & Xbox 360: EU: November 9, 2007; NA: November 13, 2007; AU: November 15, 2007; JP: February 14, 2008 (PS2, Wii, X360); PlayStation 3 & PlayStation Portable: EU: November 9, 2007; NA: November 13, 2007; AU: November 22, 2007; JP: February 14, 2008 (PS3)
- Genre: Sports
- Modes: Single-player, multiplayer, multiplayer online

WWE SmackDown vs. Raw 2008 (also known as WWE SmackDown vs. Raw 2008 featuring ECW) is a professional wrestling video game published by THQ in November 2007, and developed by Yuke's for the PlayStation 2, PlayStation 3, Xbox 360, Wii, and PlayStation Portable video game consoles, with Amaze Entertainment overseeing development for the Nintendo DS version.

SmackDown vs. Raw 2008 is the ninth overall installment of the video game series based on the professional wrestling promotion World Wrestling Entertainment (WWE), the fourth game in the SmackDown vs. Raw series, the sequel to 2006's SmackDown vs. Raw 2007, and the first WWE game to feature the promotion's ECW brand.

The game was succeeded by WWE SmackDown vs. Raw 2009.

== Gameplay ==
Each wrestler now has two fighting style categories, one primary and one secondary. Each fighting style has its advantages and disadvantages in each particular match type. There are eight styles altogether: high-flyer, hardcore, submission, powerhouse, showman, brawler, dirty and technical. In addition, creative manager of THQ Cory Ledesma said early in production that he planned on having numerous wrestler animations redone.

A new "struggle submission system" has been introduced, incorporating more analog control into the game. The player executing the submission can now decide how much pressure is applied by moving the analog stick in a particular direction. Similarly, the player locked in a submission hold will have to power out also by using the analog stick.

The game features the revived ECW brand, and it takes its place alongside the established Raw and SmackDown! brands. The official box art features the ECW logo prominently. The game's ECW branding has expanded the number of weapons available under the ring during gameplay. New weapons such as guitars are available and tables and barbed wire bats can be set on fire. Despite the inclusion of the brand, the franchise kept its SmackDown! vs. Raw name, although an early logo included "ECW Invasion" in the title. It had been changed, however, to "Featuring ECW".

The game features several arenas where WWE held events in 2006 and 2007. There are also arenas based on each WWE television show.

=== Modes ===
Elijah Burke making his ring entrance

The game allows several different game modes to be played, each with different goals and options. The Season and General Manager Modes of previous games have been merged into the new "WWE 24/7" mode, which takes its name from WWE's video on-demand service. Players can choose to play one of the game's included superstars or create a superstar, or as a general manager of one of the brands. Playing as a wrestler, the goal is to take that wrestler and achieve "legend" status. In order to do so, the player has to win matches, then team with and feud with other wrestlers, and gain popularity. At the same time, they must choose whether to train, exercise, relax, or take part in other activities when not wrestling, all with their own positive and negative effects. The player could only choose to be either on the Smackdown brand or the Raw brand, as the ECW brand was excluded.

Playing as a general manager is similar to the previous General Manager modes in the series, in which one has to choose a brand and act as its General Manager (Jonathan Coachman for Raw, Theodore Long for SmackDown!, Tommy Dreamer for ECW), draft a roster and make decisions to make it the most popular brand of the three. The General Manager is allowed to make staffing decisions, schedule workouts and events. This was also the last game in the series to have a General Manager mode until WWE 2K22. There is also an all-new "Tournament Mode", which allows the player to control a superstar through the various stages of the WWE tournament, such as Beat The Clock Sprint and King of the Ring, as well as Money in the Bank tournament. The game also allows the players to create their own tournament. This feature is excluded from the Nintendo DS and mobile versions. Like previous games in the series, the game also allows players to challenge for and defend championships. The game includes championships used by the WWE in 2007, bringing back the branded championships from the previous game and for the first time, the ECW Championship.

== Fighting style system ==
The game featured the Fighting Style System which would not appear in later games until the release of WWE 2K18, where the system has returned. With each style, the character would adopt a series of preset abilities. Depending on primary ability, they would also be able to perform a unique move that can only be activated if the player has a stored finisher icon.

The fighting styles were Powerhouse, Showman, Hardcore, Dirty, Brawler, High-Flyer, Submission and Technical. This system was highly criticized as these pre-setting gave some wrestlers abilities which they cannot actually use, or stopped them from using common moves. For example, Carlito and Chavo Guerrero did not have the ability to perform any of their springboard attacks, and Mr. McMahon was as strong as some of the larger characters in the game. Also, the choice of fighting styles limited the variety of moves available in create-a-moveset.

Wrestlers with the powerhouse fighting style can break out of a pin attempt with just one button press, unless they had sustained a large amount of arm damage. They could also do a powerful Irish Whip (later named a 'Hammer Throw'), which could cause damage if the opponent hit the corner turnbuckles. A player (regardless of weight) could be sent reeling over the top rope with the force of this move. Their special ability was called 'Rampage', a temporary adrenaline rush in which their grapple moves could not be reversed or blocked.

Technical wrestlers automatically reversed all quick grapple moves until they had taken a good deal of arm damage. They also had the ability to perform diving attacks onto opponents outside of the ring. Their special ability was an adrenaline rush that allowed them to counter every attack for a limited time.

Showman is one of the more common kinds. Performing taunts or dives from higher positions cause a faster rise in momentum. They also have 2 special abilities. One allows them to perform one of their opponent's taunts, and if uninterrupted, the opponent is unable to gain any momentum for a limited time. They can alternatively copy their opponent's finishing move if in the correct position to do so. However, the copied move is weaker than the original.

The most common kind is the Brawler. Brawlers can sit on a downed opponent and punch their opponent's head repeatedly. They also have a special combination of 3 to 5 strikes. If the first strike connects, the defending wrestler is not able to block, avoid or counter the remainder of the strikes in the combination. Their special ability is called 'Wreck Shop', a limited adrenaline rush in which all opponent strikes are countered and all strikes become unblockable.

High-flyers can perform springboard diving attacks to opponents inside or outside of the ring. Instead of countering or side-stepping attacks, they perform an evasive roll. Their special ability is a possum pin. After recovering from being knocked down, a high-flyer can remain on the ground. If the attacker attempts a grapple move, the defending wrestler will go for a pin attempt which is difficult to break out of. However, if the opponent attempts a strike, then the pin attempt is lost.

Submission wrestlers can break out of Struggle Submissions with ease. They can also force an opponent to submit to any Struggle Submission, even if it is not a finisher or signature move.

Dirty wrestlers, like Chavo Guerrero, can perform dirty moves, which boost their momentum faster. They can also remove turnbuckle covers and use weapons to build momentum. They can also use the referee as a human shield, making themselves immune to all attacks. When they release the referee, they shove him into the opponent. This is difficult to avoid and momentarily stuns the opponent and the referee. Their special move involves an eye-poke and a low blow which causes a lot of damage to the head and torso.

Hardcore wrestlers get momentum bonuses for using weapons. They can also perform grapple moves while holding a weapon. If they try to use a steel chair with full momentum, they automatically perform the Steel Chair DDT. If they are caused to bleed, they instantly get full momentum. Their special move can only be performed with a steel chair in hand. They strike themselves in the face repeated until they bleed. While this causes full momentum, it also causes critical head damage.

== Development ==
The game had a marketing budget of $11 million.

Kane wrestles Rey Mysterio. This was an early screenshot; Rey Mysterio's attire was changed from white to black during development.

=== PlayStation 2 ===
Graphics and gameplay are similar to the previous years in the SvR series. It also includes the new 24/7 mode which includes Become a Legend or GM Mode where the players can also train superstars and gain them popularity.

=== Xbox 360 and PlayStation 3 ===
The Xbox 360 has the custom soundtrack feature which people can import their own music in superstars entrances. However, the PS3 has a first person view in entrances where people can control where the superstar looks with the Sixaxis controller.

The PS3 version also had a special "Collector's Edition" which came with a DVD detailing the game, a Kelly Kelly trading card, and a booklet featuring various superstars signature moves.

The Xbox 360 version also had special "High Flyer" and "Dirty" Editions which came with Special Edition Slipcase, "I'm a High Flyer" or "I Fight Dirty" T-shirts, 1 page Kelly Kelly calendar, 8 Numbered Limited Edition "Fighting Styles" Postcards, and a "Create a Superstar" Mini Guide.

=== Wii ===
Instead of featuring 24/7 mode, it features Main Event Mode where the players can play as a created superstar and rise to the top. The Wii version of the game features only chairs as the exclusive weapons. Also the Wii version only has 5 match types such as Singles Match, Hardcore Match, Tag Team Match, Triple Threat Match and Knockout Match.

=== PSP ===
The game has the same graphics as the previous games in the SvR PSP ports, but Slaughter, Eddie Guerrero and Jim Neidhart are PSP exclusive unlockable Legends.

=== Matches ===
This would be the last game to feature the Buried Alive Match, as it would not appear in its sequel SmackDown vs. Raw 2009, or any other games to follow until WWE 2K16 (only in the 2K Showcase).

== Reception ==
Reception

Aggregate scores
| Aggregator | Score | | | | | |
| Aggregator | DS | PS2 | PS3 | PSP | Wii | Xbox 360 |
|---|---|---|---|---|---|---|
| GameRankings | 61.64% | 73.60% | 71.72% | 66.20% | 59.14% | 70.47% |
| Metacritic | 61/100 | 71/100 | 74/100 | 68/100 | 59/100 | 71/100 |

Review scores
| Publication | Score | | | | | |
| Publication | DS | PS2 | PS3 | PSP | Wii | Xbox 360 |
|---|---|---|---|---|---|---|
| Electronic Gaming Monthly | | | | | | 6.83/10 |
| Eurogamer | | | | | | 6/10 |
| Game Informer | | | 8/10 | | | 8/10 |
| GamePro | | | 4.5/5 | | | 4.5/5 |
| GameRevolution | | C | C | | | C |
| GameSpot | 6.5/10 | 6.5/10 | 6.5/10 | | 4.5/10 | 6.5/10 |
| GameSpy | 3/5 | | 3/5 | | | 3/5 |
| GameTrailers | | | 7.4/10 | | | 7.4/10 |
| GameZone | 7/10 | 7/10 | 7.5/10 | 6.5/10 | 7.5/10 | 7/10 |
| IGN | 7/10 | 6.8/10 | 7.5/10 | 6.5/10 | 7.5/10 | 7.8/10 |
| Nintendo Power | | | | | 6.5/10 | |
| Official Xbox Magazine (US) | | | | | | 8.5/10 |
| PlayStation: The Official Magazine | | 8.5/10 | 9/10 | | | |

Smackdown vs. Raw 2008 received "mixed or average" reviews upon release. GameRankings and Metacritic gave it a score of 73.60% and 71 out of 100 for the PlayStation 2 version; 71.72% and 74 out of 100 for the PlayStation 3 version; 70.47% and 71 out of 100 for the Xbox 360 version; 66.20% and 68 out of 100 for the PSP version; 61.64% and 61 out of 100 for the DS version; 59.14% and 59 out of 100 for the Wii version; and 55% for the Mobile version.

For the Mobile version, GameZone gave 5.5 out of 10, while IGN gave the score four out of ten. Both reviewers were critical to its mechanics, but considered its visuals as decent.

The PlayStation 2 version of WWE SmackDown vs. Raw 2008 received a "Platinum" sales award from the Entertainment and Leisure Software Publishers Association (ELSPA), indicating sales of at least 300,000 copies in the United Kingdom. The game had shipped 6 million units across all platforms by March 2008.

== See also ==
- List of licensed wrestling video games
- List of fighting games
- List of video games in the WWE 2K Games series
- WWE 2K
