= WWE SmackDown! vs. Raw =

2004 professional wrestling video game

- Box art for the game, featuring Vince McMahon
- Developer: Yuke's
- Publishers: WW: THQ; JP: Yuke's
- Director: Taka Chihaya
- Designers: Osamu Hashimoto; Kentaro Arai
- Programmer: Tomoyuki Ishige
- Writers: Andy Abramovici; Bryan Stratton
- Series: SmackDown vs. Raw
- Platform: PlayStation 2
- Release: NA: November 2, 2004; EU: November 12, 2004; JP: February 3, 2005
- Genre: Sports
- Modes: Single-player, multiplayer

WWE SmackDown! vs. Raw (also known as Exciting Pro Wrestling 6 in Japan) is a professional wrestling video game developed by Yuke's and published by THQ for the PlayStation 2 in North America on November 2, 2004, Europe on November 12, 2004, and Japan on February 3, 2005. It is the sixth installment of professional wrestling promotion World Wrestling Entertainment (WWE)'s video game series, the sequel to 2003's WWE SmackDown! Here Comes the Pain, and the first game to be released under the SmackDown! vs. Raw title. The game series was rebranded after the introduction of the brand extension which divided WWE's roster into two brands, the latter brand in the game's title being named after WWE's weekly Monday Night Raw program.

WWE SmackDown! vs. Raw was succeeded by WWE SmackDown! vs. Raw 2006.

== Gameplay ==
Screenshot of the new Parking Lot Brawl featuring Eddie Guerrero and John Cena

The game is largely similar to its predecessor, but adds some key features.

Several new gameplay features are introduced, including pre-match and mid-match minigames. The pre-match mini-games are randomly chosen before every singles match and include a test of strength, a stare down, and a shoving match. Several mid-match mini-games include the chop battle, and a spanking mini-game for female wrestlers in bra and panties matches. The meter mechanic from the chop battles are retained, but the player must perfectly time the button press three consecutive times to win.

The ability to sustain a submission till the count of 5 once a rope break had been reached was also implemented. The game features several arenas based on pay-per-views held by WWE in 2003 and 2004, as well as arenas based on each weekly WWE television show.

Also added to the game was the Clean/Dirty system, which influenced each wrestler's tactics. Players can choose if the wrestler is clean, dirty or neutral. A clean or dirty wrestler has a unique meter that can be filled up by performing special clean/dirty actions or moves.

WWE SmackDown! vs. Raw also includes a redone WWE PPV (Pay-Per-View) mode from its past games where the player can play sample PPVs based on real life match cards from 2004, or create a PPV of their own by booking matches and choosing match types with any superstar, legend or created superstar in the game. Created championships could also be waged in the created PPVs. Before playing the PPV, the game would show a generic highlight reel featuring two of the superstars in the main event of the show. Play-by-play commentary was also improved, with the commentary beginning to improve and sync up with the matches more.

The game also featured an all-new Create-a-Championship mode, in which the player can create and defend the title in their created PPVs. The game also includes the Create-A-Wrestler mode from previous games where the created superstar's movesets, attributes, entrances, and brand could be customized. The create mode was improved from the previous game. Stables could also be created featuring any wrestler and entrances could also be customized.

A new Challenge mode provides gamers with opportunities to challenge themselves at different difficulty levels. In addition, several challenges put gamers in memorable matches from the past and beating these challenges will help unlock alternate attires and arenas.

SmackDown! vs. Raw was also the first installment in the series to feature an online mode, but only Single or Bra & Panties matches can be played.

== Reception ==
Reception

Aggregate score
Aggregator	Score
Metacritic	80/100

Review scores
Publication	Score
Electronic Gaming Monthly	7.67/10
Eurogamer	7/10
Game Informer	8.5/10
GameSpot	8.1/10
GameSpy	4/5
GameZone	8.7/10
IGN	8.4/10
Official U.S. PlayStation Magazine	3.5/5
VideoGamer.com	7/10
X-Play	4/5
Detroit Free Press	3/4

The game has a score of 80/100 on review aggregator Metacritic, indicating "generally favorable reviews".

The game received a "Platinum" sales award from the Entertainment and Leisure Software Publishers Association (ELSPA), indicating sales of at least 300,000 copies in the United Kingdom.

=== Accolades ===
Distributor:	Category:	Result:
2004 Spike Video Game Awards	Best Fighting Game	Nominated
9th Annual Interactive Achievement Awards	Fighting Game of the Year	Nominated

== See also ==
- List of professional wrestling video games
- List of fighting games
- List of WWE 2K Games video games
