= WWE SmackDown vs. Raw 2007 =

2006 professional wrestling video game

- NTSC cover art featuring (clockwise from top left) Rey Mysterio, John Cena, Torrie Wilson, Triple H and Batista (Note: The PAL-region cover art solely features Triple H.)
- Developer: Yuke's
- Publisher: THQ
- Series: SmackDown vs. Raw
- Platforms: PlayStation 2; Xbox 360; PlayStation Portable
- Release: PlayStation 2 & Xbox 360: EU: November 10, 2006; US: November 14, 2006; AU: November 16, 2006; JP: January 25, 2007; PlayStation Portable: NA: December 6, 2006; EU: December 15, 2006; AU: December 23, 2006; JP: February 22, 2007
- Genre: Sports
- Modes: Single-player, multiplayer

WWE SmackDown vs. Raw 2007 is a professional wrestling video game developed by Yuke's and published by THQ in 2006. It is the third game under the WWE SmackDown vs Raw name, the eighth game overall in the video game series based on the World Wrestling Entertainment (WWE) professional wrestling promotion, and is the successor to 2005's WWE SmackDown! vs. Raw 2006. The game was released worldwide in November 2006 for PlayStation 2 and Xbox 360, and a month later for PlayStation Portable. The Xbox 360 version was the first game in the series to be published on a seventh-generation video game console. A PlayStation 3 version was also planned as a launch title but was later canceled.

New features introduced included an analog control system, interactive hotspots, and fighting within the arena crowd. The game also included several improvements on the previous game's existing match types and modes.

SmackDown vs. Raw 2007 was succeeded by WWE SmackDown vs. Raw 2008.

== Gameplay ==
=== Match gameplay ===
The game presents a realistic fighting experience with a new analog control grappling system, enabling the player to throw and pick up their opponent anywhere they want, in contrast to previous preset animations. In the new system, grappling moves are now affected by analog control, in contrast to the button-based system from preceding games. Much like the previous game, one can also move around the ring by analog control instead of using the D-pad. An option to switch to the previous control layout is also possible. The chain reversal system has also been improved and now involves grapples as well as strikes.

The Category 1 and Category 2 movesets are determined by weight-class now, so lighter wrestlers have access to martial arts or luchador move-sets, while heavier wrestlers have access to more power moves. In addition, a wrestler can only lift up or hurt with certain strikes, wrestlers one weight class heavier than them or less.

The game features several arenas that WWE held events at in 2005 and 2006. There are also arenas based on each WWE television show.

A lot more interactivity in the arenas is also present such as fighting within the crowd. Signs and objects from the crowd can be used to beat down the opponent. One major feature is the inclusion of environmental "hotspots" such as the ring ropes, steel steps and scaffolding which players can interact with. The PlayStation 2 version however has a restriction on crowd fighting and interaction for specific match types.

The graphics have also improved with each superstar consisting of 20,000 polygons for the Xbox 360 compared to the total of 5,000 from the PlayStation 2 version of the previous game. Sweat from the wrestlers has now been included in the Xbox 360 version of the game. The game's audio system has been overhauled and features new sound effects in Dolby 5.1 as well as the inclusion of new crowd chants and grunting from the wrestlers.

=== Season Mode ===
WWE SmackDown vs RAW 2007 includes 'season mode', allowing you to step into the shoes of a select group of wrestlers and control them as they navigate storylines. There are unique storylines for both the SmackDown and RAW brands. The game mode features voice acting from WWE talent, both in and out of the ring. Some of these voiced talent include: The Undertaker, Shawn Michaels, Kane, & Kurt Angle

While superstars who are assigned to either the SmackDown or RAW brand are locked to their brand for the beginning of Season Mode, superstars assigned to the 'legend' brand will be able to choose whether to start with the SmackDown or RAW route. Each Season Mode path culminates with a match at WrestleMania.

Season Mode also introduces "trophies". Trophies are earned by winning matches at Pay-Per-View Events, and reward the player by allowing them to purchase legend superstars, championship belts, and attires to use in exhibition mode. Players also are rewarded money (used for purchasing unlockable cosmetics from the in-game shop) for completing matches, with a larger sum of money being awarded in a match resulting in a win.

=== Create modes ===
For the Create-A-Superstar mode, singer Lemmy's face is put in the game as a template.

The Create-An-Entrance mode has been improved with a new preview mode. As well as instantaneous previews of the entrances when the player makes a change, one can also specifically set the timing for camera angles, pyrotechnics and other effects. Despite the Xbox 360's hard drive and MP3 capability, the game is unable to recognize any music the player may have saved onto the console's hard drive, unlike previous WWE games for the original Xbox, which allowed players to set custom entrance music.

There is also a Create-A-Stable mode, which allows the player to make a tag-team, alliance, or a stable with up to five members. This also allows the player to come out in the same entrance as their teammates, unlike many other WWE games.

Inspired by John Cena's custom spinner championship belts, the ability to create belts with spinning centerpieces in the returning Create-A-Championship mode is now possible. The player also has the ability to manually spin these belts during an entrance. The championship belts from the previous game are included in this game in addition to created belts. These include the belts used by WWE in 2006: the WWE, World Heavyweight, Intercontinental, United States, World Tag Team, WWE Tag Team, Women's and Cruiserweight championships. Stone Cold Steve Austin's "Smoking Skull" belt and the nWo's version of the WCW World Heavyweight Championship joined Ted DiBiase's Million Dollar Championship and the WWE Hardcore Championship as classic belts that can also be won and defended in the game.

=== Roster ===
Name	Overall	Brand
Bam Bam Bigelow	85	Legends
Batista	89	SmackDown
Big Show	84	RAW
Bobby Lashley	87	SmackDown
Booker T	87	SmackDown
Bret Hart	92	Legends
Cactus Jack	91	Legends
Candice Michelle	52	RAW
Carlito	86	RAW
Chavo Guerrero	82	RAW
Chris Benoit	90	SmackDown
Chris Masters	87	RAW
Daivari	81	RAW
Dude Love	88	Legends
Dusty Rhodes	85	Legends
Eddie Guerrero	90	Legends
Edge	90	RAW
Finlay	85	SmackDown
Gregory Helms	82	SmackDown
Hardcore Holly	84	SmackDown
Hulk Hogan	93	Legends
JBL	85	SmackDown
Jerry Lawler	84	Legends
Jillian Hall	51	SmackDown
Jim Neidhart	84	Legends
Joey Mercury	82	SmackDown
John Cena	90	RAW
Johnny Nitro	86	SmackDown
Kane	86	RAW
Ken Kennedy	84	SmackDown
Kid Kash	84	SmackDown
Kurt Angle	95	RAW
Lance Cade	79	RAW
Lita	65	RAW
Mankind	91	Legends
Mark Henry	82	SmackDown
Matt Hardy	84	SmackDown
Melina	60	SmackDown
Mick Foley	88	RAW
Mickie James	65	RAW
Mr. Perfect	86	Legends
Paul Burchill	82	SmackDown
Psicosis	81	SmackDown
Randy Orton	88	SmackDown
Rey Mysterio	90	SmackDown
Ric Flair	87	RAW
Rob Van Dam	89	RAW
Roddy Piper	89	Legends
Shane McMahon	85	Legends
Shawn Michaels	91	RAW
Shelton Benjamin	87	RAW
Snitsky	79	RAW
Steve Austin	91	Legends
Super Crazy	82	SmackDown
Tazz	88	Legends
The Boogeyman	85	SmackDown
The Great Khali	81	SmackDown
The Rock	91	Legends
Torrie Wilson	57	RAW
Trevor Murdoch	77	RAW
Triple H	94	RAW
Trish Stratus	69	RAW
Umaga	83	RAW
Undertaker	89	SmackDown
Viscera	79	RAW
Vito	81	SmackDown
William Regal	82	SmackDown

== Release ==
The official demo for WWE SmackDown vs. Raw 2007 was released on the Xbox Live Marketplace in September 2006, containing a No-DQ match between Triple H and Kane.

Like the previous game, the game was released on the PlayStation 2 and the PlayStation Portable. While the series has traditionally been exclusive to the PlayStation series of consoles, this game was released on Xbox 360 after a series of lackluster wrestling games THQ released on the original Xbox. This is the first time a game in the SmackDown! series is featured in two different console generations. A SteelBook version of the PlayStation 2 release was available exclusively in Australia.

A PlayStation 3 version was also planned but was eventually cancelled. The developers publicly announced that they would rather concentrate their efforts on other game systems. The next installment, SmackDown vs. Raw 2008 was released for the PlayStation 3 and all future WWE games for the following 10 years have been released for the console. However, the PlayStation 2 version can be played on any PlayStation 3 models with PlayStation 2 backwards compatibility support. There was also consideration over releasing the game on the Wii as the game's developers were waiting to learn more about the system, but during a video interview, creative manager Cory Ledesma revealed that there were no plans for it to be released on the Wii.

A special edition version for the Xbox 360 was sold for a limited time at EB Games and GameStop. This version featured the game in an aluminum case along with a bonus disc from The History of the WWE Championship DVD boxset and a copy of The Ultimate WWE Trivia Book.

The Japanese releases of the game was released by then-recently established Japanese branch of THQ, rather than Yuke's themselves, following legal issues relating to Yuke's self-publication of WWE games in Japan. As a result, the Exciting Pro Wrestling subtitle for that region was retired.

== Reception ==
Reception

Aggregate score
Aggregator	Score		
Aggregator	PS2	PSP	Xbox 360
Metacritic	80/100	78/100	81/100

Review scores
Publication	Score		
Publication	PS2	PSP	Xbox 360
Electronic Gaming Monthly	7.5/10	N/A	7.5/10
Eurogamer	N/A	N/A	7/10
Famitsu	N/A	24/40	29/40
Game Informer	8.75/10	N/A	8.75/10
GamePro	N/A	N/A	4.25/5
GameSpot	8.1/10	7.9/10	8.1/10
GameSpy	4/5	N/A	4/5
GameTrailers	N/A	N/A	8/10
GameZone	8.2/10	8.5/10	8/10
IGN	8/10	7.8/10	8/10
Official U.S. PlayStation Magazine	7/10	N/A	N/A
Official Xbox Magazine (US)	N/A	N/A	8.5/10
Detroit Free Press	N/A	N/A	3/4

SmackDown vs. Raw 2007 received highly positive reviews upon release. According to video game review aggregator Metacritic, the game received favorable reviews on all platforms. In Japan, Famitsu gave it a score of one eight and three sevens for the Xbox 360 version, and one five, one seven and two sixes for the PSP version.

The game received praise for presentation and the high amount of content, but was criticized for collision detection issues (such as wrestlers being able to superplex another off an ladder without climbing it, making the Money in the Bank match extremely difficult), and glitches (particularly on the PS2 version for incorrect commentary and ring announcing).

The PlayStation 2 version of SmackDown vs. Raw 2007 received a "Platinum" sales award from the Entertainment and Leisure Software Publishers Association (ELSPA), indicating sales of over 300,000 copies in the United Kingdom.

== See also ==
- List of licensed wrestling video games
- List of fighting games
- List of video games in the WWE 2K Games series
- WWE 2K
