= 2022 Knox County, Tennessee mayoral election =

Mayoral Election of Knox County

2022 Knox County mayoral election
- August 4, 2022
- Turnout: 18.07% ▼8.24 pp
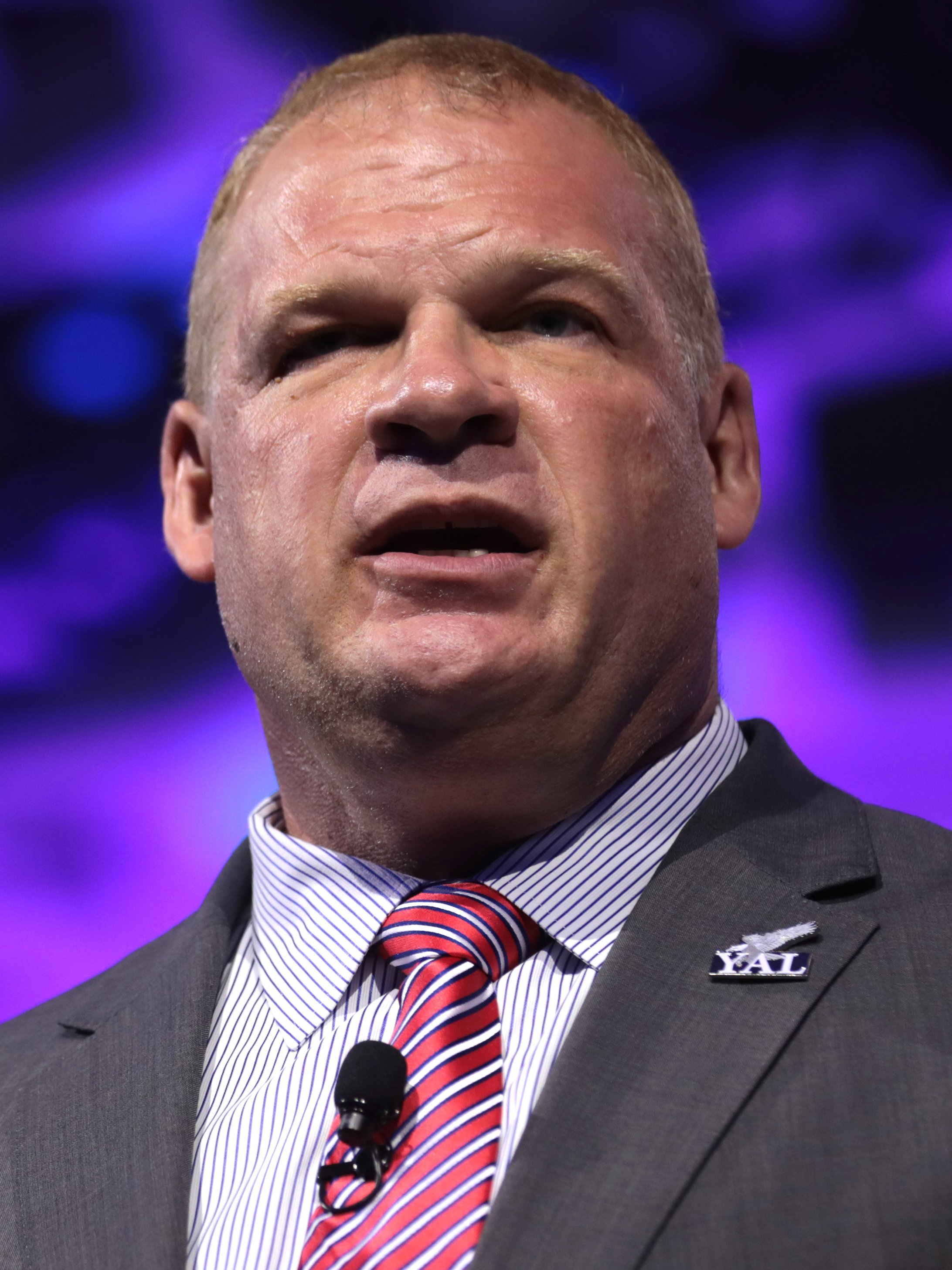

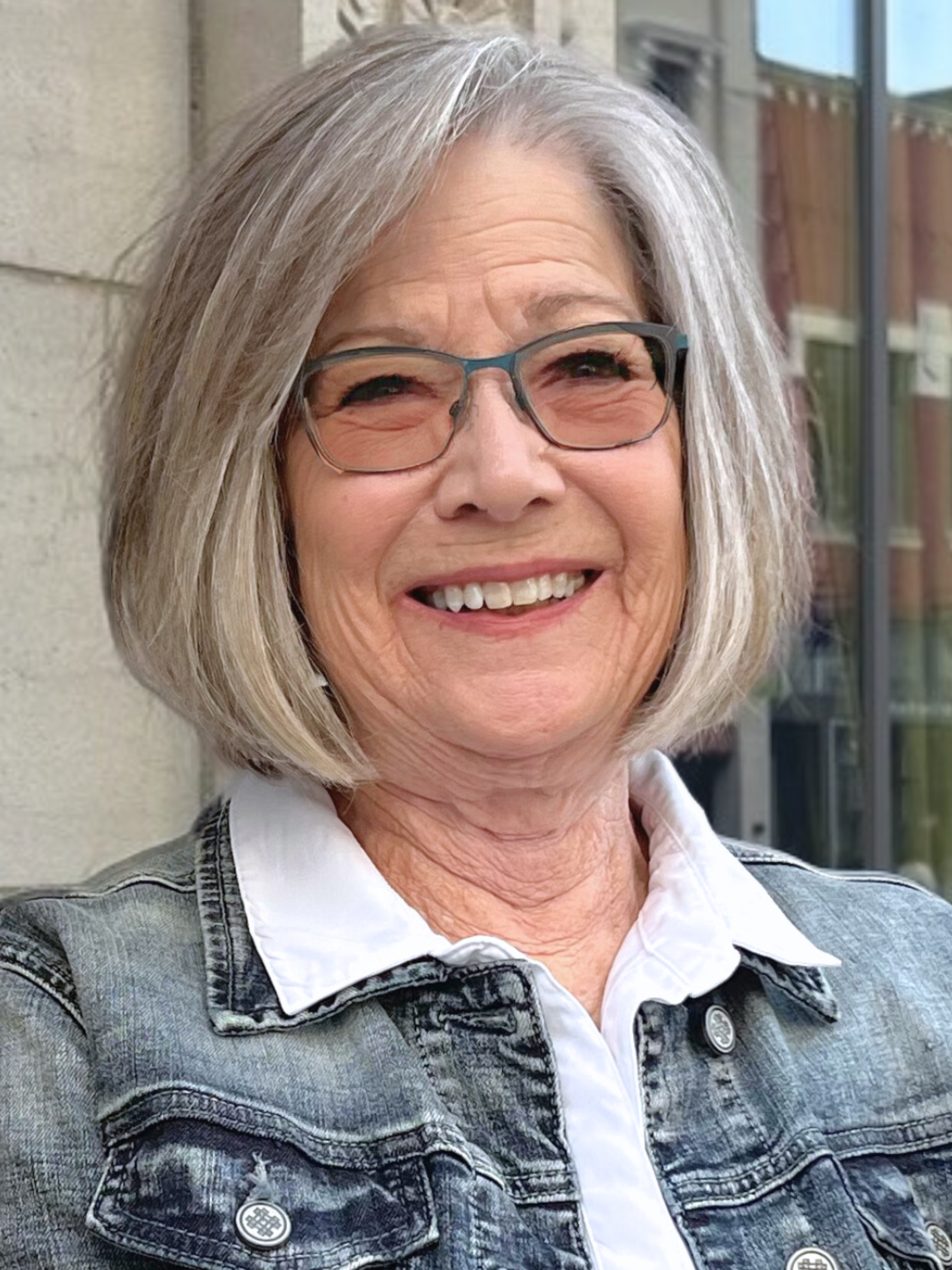
Candidate	Glenn Jacobs	Debbie Helsley
Party	Republican	Democratic
Popular vote	30,306	24,520
Percentage	55.28%	44.72%
- Jacobs: 50–60% 60–70% 70–80% 80–90% Helsley: 50–60% 60–70% 70–80% 80–90% >90% No data
Mayor before election
Glenn Jacobs
Republican
Elected Mayor
Glenn Jacobs
Republican

An election was held on August 4, 2022, to determine the mayor of Knox County, Tennessee. The election was held concurrently with primary elections for various state offices, including the gubernatorial primaries. Incumbent Republican mayor Glenn Jacobs won re-election with 55.3% of the vote, defeating Democratic nominee Debbie Helsley.

As mayor, Jacobs branded himself as a libertarian and opposed COVID-19 restrictions like mask mandates.

Jacobs massively underperformed compared to his win in 2018, underperforming the most in the city of Knoxville. Voter turnout was extremely low, with only 18.1% of registered voters turning out. Jacob's massive underperformance and the lower voter turnout is mainly due to the fact that Republican Governor Bill Lee ran unopposed in his primary election and his Democratic challenger had a competitive primary. In 2018, local races saw higher voter turnout because all of the primary elections were contested that year.

== Republican primary ==
=== Candidates ===
- Glenn Jacobs, incumbent mayor and professional wrestler better known as 'Kane'

Republican primary results
Party	Candidate	Votes	%
Republican	Glenn Jacobs (incumbent)	24,687	100.00%
Total votes		24,687	100.00%

== Democratic primary ==
=== Candidates ===
Nominee

- Debbie Helsley, communications worker, and labor union leader

Eliminated in primary

- Bob Fischer, retired delivery driver and activist
- Tyler Givens, engineer and contractor

Democratic primary results
Party	Candidate	Votes	%
Democratic	Debbie Helsley	5,921	74.20%
Democratic	Tyler Givens	1,397	17.51%
Democratic	Bob Fischer	662	8.30%
Total votes		7,980	100.00%

== General election ==
General election results
Party	Candidate	Votes	%
Republican	Glenn Jacobs	30,306	55.28%
Democratic	Debbie Helsley	24,520	44.72%
Write-in	Tracy A. Clough (write-in)	1	0.00%
Total votes		54,827	100.00%

== See also ==
- 2022 Tennessee elections
- 2022 Hamilton County, Tennessee, mayoral election
- 2022 Shelby County, Tennessee, mayoral election
