= Kane (wrestler) =

American professional wrestler and politician (born 1967)

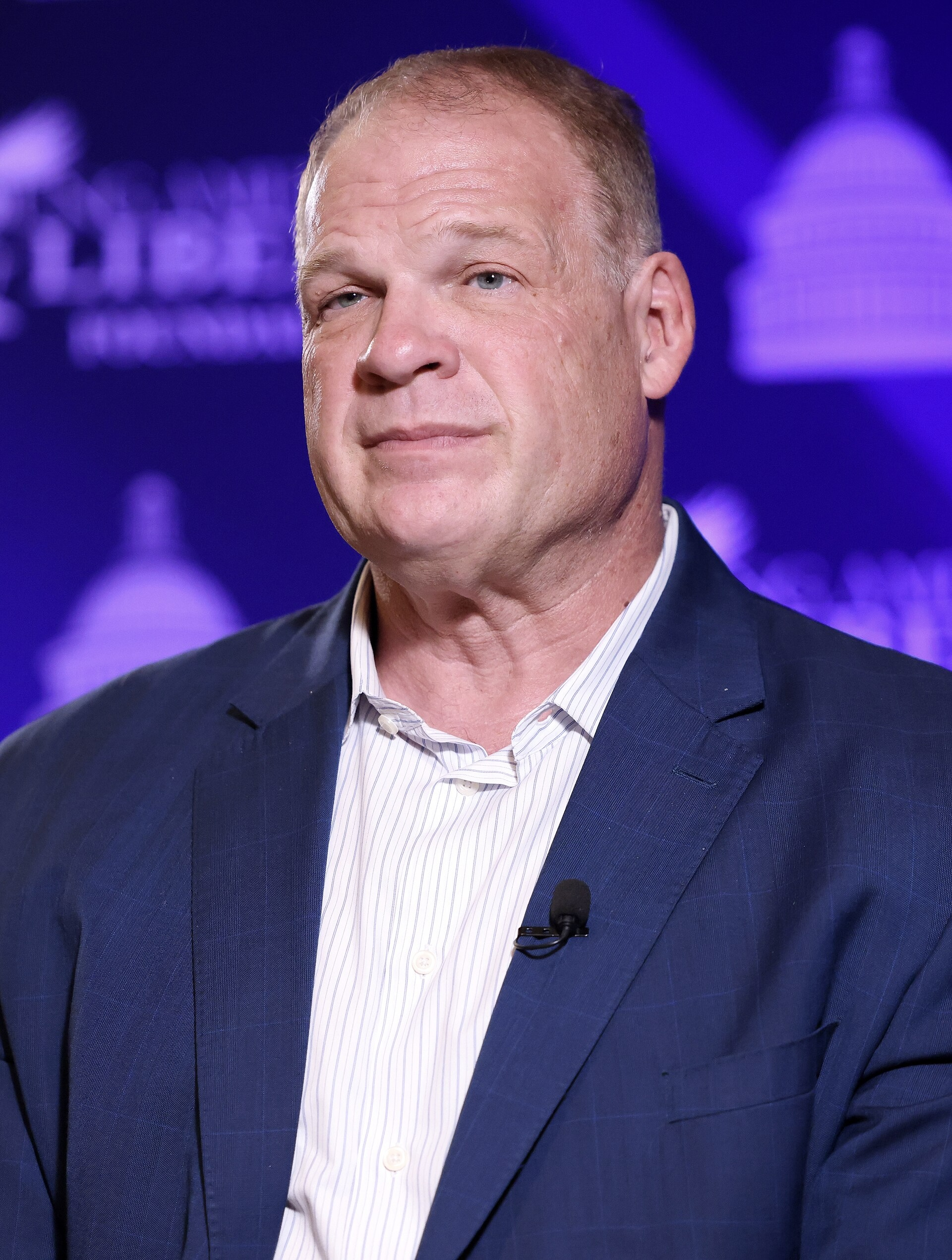
- Jacobs in 2024

Mayor of Knox County
- In office September 1, 2018 – September 1, 2026
- Preceded by: Tim Burchett
- Succeeded by: Betsy Henderson

Personal details
- Born: Glenn Thomas Jacobs; April 26, 1967 (age 59) Torrejón de Ardoz, Spain
- Citizenship: United States
- Party: Republican
- Spouse: Crystal Goins (m. 1995)
- Children: 2
- Education: Northeast Missouri State University (BA)
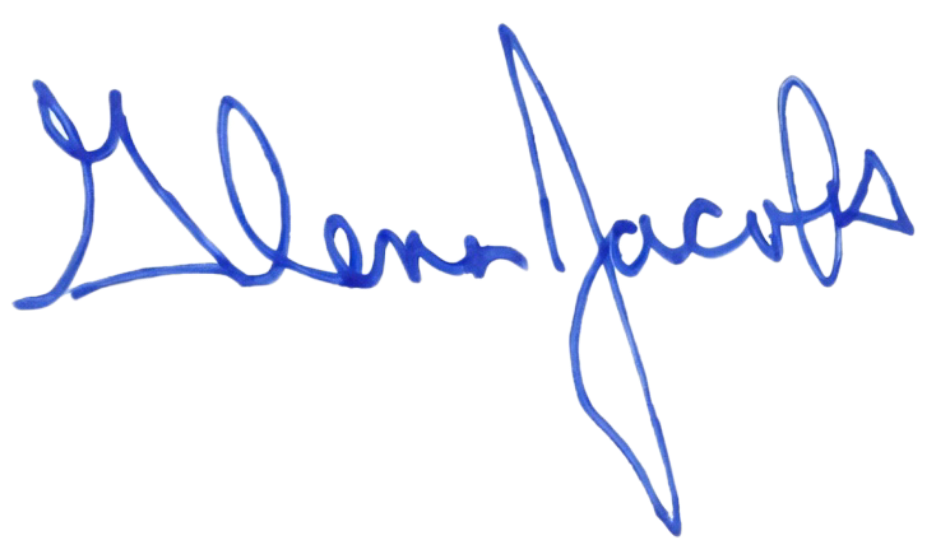
- Signature
- Website: Campaign website
- Professional wrestling career
- Ring names: Angus King; Bruiser Mastino; The Christmas Creature; Diesel; Doomsday; Glenn Jacobs; Isaac Yankem, DDS; Kane; Spartacus; Unabomb; Mike Unabomb
- Billed height: 7 ft 0 in (213 cm)
- Billed weight: 323 lb (147 kg)
- Billed from: Decatur, Illinois (as Isaac Yankem, DDS)
- Trained by: Dean Malenko; Jeff Bradley; Ray Candy
- Debut: 1992

YouTube information
- Channel: Knox County Mayor Glenn Jacobs
- Years active: 2019–present
- Subscribers: 23.9 thousand
- Views: 1.29 million
- Last updated: June 23, 2026

Glenn Thomas Jacobs (born April 26, 1967), also known by his ring name Kane, is an American politician, actor, and professional wrestler. He rose to fame in WWE, where he holds the record for most matches (including dark matches and house shows) in WWE history. He served as the mayor of Knox County, Tennessee, from 2018 to 2026.

Jacobs began his professional wrestling career on the independent circuit in 1992, wrestling in promotions such as Smoky Mountain Wrestling and the United States Wrestling Association before joining the World Wrestling Federation (WWF, now WWE) in 1995. He played various characters until 1997, when he was repackaged as the masked wrestler Kane, a horror-themed personification of fire and the juggernaut younger half-brother of the Undertaker and son of Paul Bearer.

Kane alternatively feuded and teamed with the Undertaker, the latter as the Brothers of Destruction. Following his WWF debut, he remained a pivotal component of the company's Attitude Era of the late 1990s and early 2000s, defeating top star Stone Cold Steve Austin for the WWF Championship in his first pay-per-view (PPV) main event at King of the Ring in June 1998. He continued to headline PPV cards over the next 20 years, with more PPV appearances than any other performer in WWF/WWE history besides Randy Orton.

In WWE, Kane won numerous championships; he is a three-time world champion (having held the WWF Championship, ECW Championship and World Heavyweight Championship once each), a 12-time world tag team champion (having held the World Tag Team Championship, WCW Tag Team Championship and WWE Tag Team Championship), and a WWE Grand Slam Champion. Kane currently also holds several records at the Royal Rumble, including the record for the most appearances in a Royal Rumble match at 20, the quickest elimination of another competitor at 1.9 seconds and the highest cumulative total eliminations at 46, a record held since the 2015 Royal Rumble match. Kane was inducted into the WWE Hall of Fame in 2021.

A long-term supporter of libertarian political causes, Jacobs sought and won the mayoral seat of Knox County, Tennessee, in 2018 and was re-elected in 2022. Jacobs also made numerous appearances in film and on television, including the lead role in the 2006 WWE Studios production See No Evil and its 2014 sequel.

== Early life ==
Jacobs was born on April 26, 1967, in the Spanish town of Torrejón de Ardoz, to a United States Air Force family that was stationed in Spain at the time of his birth. He grew up in the United States near St. Louis, Missouri, and attended high school in Bowling Green, Missouri, where he excelled in football and basketball.

Jacobs went on to earn a degree in English literature at Northeast Missouri State University, where he played both basketball and football. As a center for the Northeast Missouri State Bulldogs basketball program, he was named honorable-mention all-conference twice. Jacobs became a guard on the football team after his basketball eligibility expired, but suffered a knee injury before the 1990 season that limited him to seven games. Eric Holm, the head football coach for the Bulldogs, described Jacobs as a "diamond in the rough who lacks experience," while NFL draft information coordinator Dave Thomas felt his size made him a better prospect if he switched to defensive line. After not being selected in the 1991 NFL draft, Jacobs attended the Chicago Bears' rookie camp as an undrafted free agent but failed his physical.

== Professional wrestling career ==
=== Early career (1992–1995) ===
Jacobs was trained by Dean Malenko, Ray Candy, and Jeff Bradley. He debuted in 1992 under the ring name "Angus King" for the Central States Wrestling Association in Hannibal, Missouri, which was owned and run by his childhood friend Mark Morton. In December 1992, he joined the United States Wrestling Association (USWA) in Memphis, Tennessee, appearing as the "Christmas Creature," an "evil Christmas character" who wore a garish costume (made by Jacobs' mother) featuring a green mask, candy cane-striped sleeves, and tinsel. The Christmas Creature unsuccessfully challenged Jerry Lawler for the USWA Unified World Heavyweight Championship before leaving the USWA later that month.

In March 1993, Jacobs made a one-off appearance with World Championship Wrestling, losing to Sting on an episode of WCW Saturday Night filmed in Macon, Georgia, under the ring name Bruiser Mastino. Later that year, he relocated to Tampa, Florida, in order to further his training. During his time in Florida, he wrestled a handful of matches for the International Championship Wrestling Alliance as "Sid Powers". After leaving Florida, he returned to the USWA as "Doomsday." On October 10, 1993, he wrestled in a dark match for the World Wrestling Federation under his real name, defeating Mike Bell at a WWF Superstars taping in Burlington, Vermont. In December 1993, he wrestled in Japan for Pro Wrestling Fujiwara Gumi under his real name.

In 1994, Jacobs began wrestling for Tri-State Wrestling promotion in Central City, Kentucky, and the Indianapolis-based Championship Wrestling as Doomsday, as well as making a handful of further appearances with Pro Wrestling Fujiwara Gumi in Japan. In May 1994, he relocated to Puerto Rico to wrestle for the World Wrestling Council as Doomsday, where he feuded with Invader 1. In November and December 1994, Jacobs wrestled for the Catch Wrestling Association in Germany as "Spartacus", competing in its Catch Cup tournament.

=== Smoky Mountain Wrestling (1995) ===
In January 1995, Jacobs was hired by Jim Cornette for his Smoky Mountain Wrestling (SMW) promotion in Morristown, Tennessee, where he was named "Unabomb" (a reference to the Unabomber). He briefly teamed with Eddie Gilbert before forming a tag team with Al Snow named the Dynamic Duo and beginning a feud with the Rock 'n' Roll Express. In April 1995, at the Bluegrass Brawl III event, the Dynamic Duo defeated the Rock 'n' Roll Express in a coal miner's glove match for the SMW Tag Team Championship (Jacobs' first championship). They held the titles until July 1995, when they lost to the Thugs. Later that month, the feud between the Dynamic Duo and the Rock 'n' Roll Express culminated in a street fight at Summer Blast 1995, with the Rock 'n' Roll Express victorious. On August 4, 1995, at the Superbowl of Wrestling event, Jacobs lost to World Wrestling Federation wrestler The Undertaker, who was making a special appearance with SMW. He made his final appearance with SMW at the following month's Fire on the Mountain 1995 event, with the Thugs defeating the Dynamic Duo in a loser leaves town match.

=== World Wrestling Federation / World Wrestling Entertainment / WWE ===
==== Early years and Fake Diesel (1995–1997) ====
Jacobs appeared with WWE (then the World Wrestling Federation or WWF) as "Mike Unabomb" at the February 20, 1995 Monday Night Raw taping, defeating Reno Riggins in a dark match. He wrestled intermittently as Unabomb through August.

Jacobs made his first television appearance with the company as "Isaac Yankem, DDS", Jerry Lawler's private dentist, in a vignette on the June 26, 1995, episode of Raw. Placing emphasis on Jacobs' imposing height and weight, Yankem was portrayed as a monstrous figure whom Lawler had hired for the purpose of ridding the WWF of his long-time nemesis, Bret Hart. The character's in-ring debut occurred at a Superstars taping on August 15, where Jacobs lost to Hart by count-out. At that month's SummerSlam event, Yankem was disqualified when he hung Hart by twisting him in the top and middle ropes by his neck. He lost to Hart in a steel cage match in the main event of the October 16 episode of Raw and finally in a tag team match against Hart and Hakushi, in which he was partnered with Lawler on November 6. After his initial run with Hart, Jacobs was part of an unsuccessful team in an elimination match at November's Survivor Series and participated in the 1996 Royal Rumble match in January. The remainder of Yankem's televised run through April included losses to The Undertaker, Jake Roberts, Marc Mero, and Ultimate Warrior. In April 1996, Jacobs was part of the "WWF Champions" tour of Germany. He was used on a series of live events in Kuwait in May as part of the Kuwait Cup tour. In May 1996 at In Your House 8: Beware of Dog, he lost to Bob Holly in a dark match. In September 1996, he took part in a WWF tour of South Africa, after which the Yankem gimmick was retired.

In September 1996, play-by-play announcer Jim Ross introduced Jacobs as Diesel, and Rick Bognar as Razor Ramon, as part of a heavily criticized storyline mocking the departure of former employees Kevin Nash and Scott Hall respectively, while attempting to portray Ross as a disgruntled employee. The pair competed primarily as a tag team, losing a WWF Tag Team Championship match to titleholders Owen Hart and The British Bulldog at December's In Your House 12: It's Time. As Diesel, he lost to The Undertaker via disqualification in the main event of the December 22 edition of WWF Superstars of Wrestling and defeated Marc Mero on WWF Shotgun Saturday Night on January 11, 1997. Diesel and Ramon last appeared on television at the 1997 Royal Rumble, where Jacobs was the third-to-last participant. Jacobs continued to work sporadic live events as Diesel through April. He competed in the 1997 Kuwait Cup, but was eliminated by Davey Boy Smith in the first round.

In May 1997, Jacobs and Razor Ramon went to Mexico to work for Lucha Libre AAA Worldwide. On June 24, 1997, Jacobs lost to Razor Ramon in a Loser Leaves Town match at USWA. In July 1997, Jacobs briefly returned to the United States Wrestling Association as Doomsday, winning the USWA Heavyweight Championship from Spellbinder. He then dropped the title to Steven Dunn on September 6.

==== Emergence of Kane; WWF Champion (1997–1998) ====
In April 1997, the WWF "slowly and meticulously" began building up to the debut of Jacobs's new character Kane, a horror-themed juggernaut and hellish personification of everything relating to fire. The character's theme and persona is rooted in malevolent acts of arson by his older half-brother, The Undertaker, that occurred during their youth. Rounding out his "Hellfire and Brimstone" gimmick, Kane was combined with the Inferno match, a specialty match personalized to him.

At In Your House 14: Revenge of the 'Taker on April 20, The Undertaker launched a fireball into the face of his former manager, Paul Bearer, who had previously had his protégé Mankind do the same to The Undertaker prior to the event. On the May 12 edition of Raw, Mankind reintroduced Bearer, who attempted to reunite with Undertaker because of his status as WWF Champion. This was all following a long period of mutual hostility between the two. After The Undertaker's adamant refusals, Bearer used the ultimatum of revealing The Undertaker's "deepest, darkest secret" to the world in order to coerce him into being his protégé. The Undertaker begrudgingly acceded to Bearer's wishes for a few months but eventually lost his patience with Bearer's abrasive management of him and rejected all association with him. Bearer responded by publicly revealing that his long-lost brother, Kane (later revealed as Bearer's illegitimate son and the Undertaker's half-brother), was coming to the WWF to challenge him. In sharing this news, Bearer disclosed that The Undertaker had started a fire at his family's funeral home, in effect murdering his family. Kane, who The Undertaker thought long dead from the incident, was left physically and mentally scarred. Undertaker claimed Kane, a pyromaniac, started the fire and could not possibly have survived (in October 1998 Undertaker confessed to purposely burning down the home in attempt to murder Kane).

Kane debuted at Badd Blood: In Your House on October 5, using The Undertaker's signature tombstone piledriver to cost him the victory in the first Hell in a Cell match against Shawn Michaels. In keeping with the notion that Kane had been burned and scarred by the fire—and to conceal Jacobs's identity—the character wore a mask, sported long hair, and wore red and black ring attire that almost covered his entire body. Kane and The Undertaker feuded with one another over the following year, during which time their history vis-à-vis one another was expounded. Jacobs won his first match as Kane against Mankind at Survivor Series on November 9. The Undertaker initially refused to face him and adamantly so while Kane humiliated him, The Undertaker claiming he had promised his parents he would never do harm to his own "flesh and blood." After what was thought to be a brief partnership, Kane betrayed The Undertaker by costing him the WWF Championship, Kane interfering in The Undertaker's title match against Shawn Michaels at the Royal Rumble on January 18, 1998. After the match, Kane locked The Undertaker in a casket and set it on fire. After a couple months of absence, The Undertaker resurrected on an episode of Raw is War, in which he was reproduced from a coffin that was struck by lightning, in this moment furiously challenging Kane.

The Undertaker defeated Kane at WrestleMania XIV on March 29. After the match, Kane and Paul Bearer attacked The Undertaker, hitting him with a steel chair and then giving a Tombstone Piledriver. On April 4, they faced each other again at Mayhem in Manchester, where the Undertaker defeated Kane again. They continued to feud until Unforgiven: In Your House on April 26, when The Undertaker defeated Kane in the first ever Inferno match. In this match, Bearer tried to help Kane by attacking Undertaker, but as Kane was retreating backstage, Vader forced Kane back towards the ring, and The Undertaker attacked them both by jumping over the ring ropes surrounded by fire before setting Kane's right arm on fire. At Over the Edge: In Your House on May 31, Kane defeated Vader in a Mask vs. Mask match.

On the June 1 episode of Raw Is War, Kane defeated The Undertaker to become the number one contender to the WWF Championship. At the King of the Ring on June 28, Kane defeated Stone Cold Steve Austin in a First Blood match following interferences by Mankind and The Undertaker to win the WWF Championship. Kane lost the title back to Austin the following night on Raw Is War.

==== The Brothers of Destruction (1998–2001) ====
In June, Kane formed a tag team with Mankind, with whom he won the WWF Tag Team Championship twice that summer. After dissension between the partners saw their second reign end at SummerSlam on August 30, Kane broke away from Mankind and allied with The Undertaker, with the duo being known as the Brothers of Destruction. At Breakdown: In Your House on September 27, Kane, The Undertaker, and Stone Cold Steve Austin competed in a triple threat match for Austin's WWF Championship; Kane and The Undertaker were prohibited from pinning each other, so they pinned Austin at the same time. The half-brothers fought one another for the vacant WWF Championship at Judgment Day: In Your House on October 18, with the match ending in a no contest when special guest referee Austin counted a double pinfall and declared himself the winner; during the match, The Undertaker betrayed Kane for Paul Bearer, turning Kane face. At Rock Bottom: In Your House on December 13, Kane interfered in the Buried Alive match between Austin and The Undertaker, attacking The Undertaker and costing him the match. As a result, The Corporation had Kane committed to an insane asylum. In December, Kane joined The Corporation to stay out of the insane asylum. During this time, Kane aligned himself with Chyna and feuded with Triple H. At WrestleMania XV on March 28, 1999, Kane was betrayed by Chyna and thrown out of The Corporation.

Kane then formed a tag team with X-Pac and acquired a girlfriend, Tori. While teaming with X-Pac, Kane evolved from being mute to aided speech through an electrolarynx to speaking unaided. He also became associated with D-Generation X (DX), the faction of which X-Pac was a member. His first unaided words were the DX slogan "suck it". The duo won the WWF Tag Team Championship twice. The tag team broke apart when X-Pac turned on Kane and rejoined DX. Kane and X-Pac then engaged in a lengthy feud against each other, which was exacerbated in early 2000, when Tori betrayed Kane and joined X-Pac and DX, leading to Kane briefly reuniting with Paul Bearer. With Bearer once again by his side, Kane proceeded to terrorize DX at every opportunity he could, once forcing the group to send Rikishi after Kane to stop him. The former partners' feud eventually ended at WrestleMania 2000 on April 2, where Kane teamed with Rikishi to defeat X-Pac and Road Dogg.

Kane returned on the May 29 episode of Raw is War, when he helped The Undertaker and The Rock fight off the McMahon-Helmsley Faction. His involvement in this feud culminated in a main event match at King of the Ring on June 25 against Vince and Shane McMahon, and then-champion Triple H. The Undertaker and Kane's rivalry resurfaced during the match, but they patched their relationship up soon after. Kane later turned heel by assaulting The Undertaker, leading to a match between the two at SummerSlam on August 27. The match ended when The Undertaker removed Kane's mask, causing him to flee the ring, covering his exposed face. Kane stayed in contention for the WWF Championship for the remainder of the year and ended 2000 in a feud with Chris Jericho; Kane defeated him at Survivor Series on November 19 and again at Rebellion on December 2, but he ultimately lost to Jericho in a Last Man Standing match at Armageddon on December 10.

Kane turned face once again by reforming his alliance with The Undertaker immediately after the Royal Rumble on January 21, 2001, in which he eliminated 11 wrestlers and was the runner-up, after being eliminated by Stone Cold Steve Austin. Kane competed for the Hardcore Championship, defeating Raven for the title at WrestleMania X-Seven on April 1 in a triple threat match that also featured Big Show, later losing the title to Rhyno on the April 19 episode of SmackDown!. Kane and The Undertaker began teaming as The Brothers of Destruction, and in the course of the year they feuded with Edge and Christian, Rikishi and Haku, and The Two-Man Power Trip. At Judgment Day on May 20, Kane defeated Triple H in a Chain match to win the Intercontinental Championship. Kane lost the title to Albert on the June 28 episode of SmackDown! following interference from Diamond Dallas Page. During The Invasion, Kane and The Undertaker feuded with Page and Kanyon after Page began stalking The Undertaker's wife Sara. The feud culminated at SummerSlam on August 19, where they defeated Page and Kanyon in a steel cage match, resulting in them holding both the WWF Tag Team and the WCW Tag Team Championships. Kane and The Undertaker defeated KroniK at Unforgiven on September 23 to retain the WCW Tag Team Championship and both participated in the ten-man Winner-Takes-All match at Survivor Series on November 18 as members of the victorious Team WWF.

==== Unmasking (2002–2004) ====
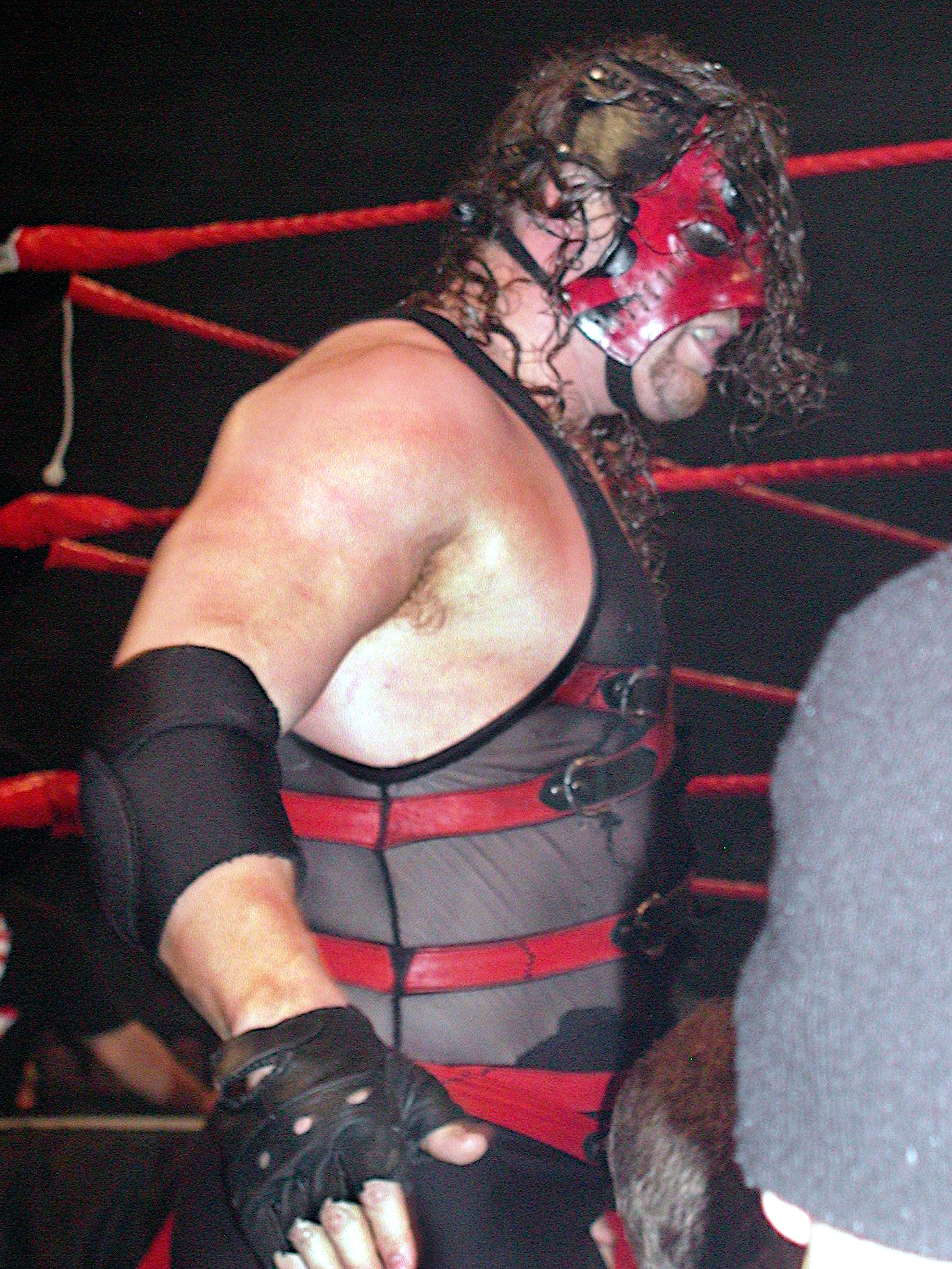
Kane in 2003, wearing his half mask weeks before his unmasking on Raw

On March 25, 2002, the WWF was divided into two brands, Raw and SmackDown!, with Kane being drafted to Raw. Kane shortly feuded with the New World Order (nWo) and began acting human by talking through his mask and referring to his fans as "Kanenites". Kane returned to the renamed WWE as part of the Raw roster in August, with a new outfit and half-mask where his facial hair was shown. On the September 23 episode of Raw, Kane and The Hurricane won the WWE Tag Team Championship after defeating The Un-Americans (Lance Storm and Christian). The following week on Raw, Kane won the Intercontinental Championship from Chris Jericho, despite interference from Triple H and Ric Flair. On the October 7 episode of Raw, Kane successfully single-handedly defended the World Tag Team Championship in a four-team Tables, Ladders, and Chairs match, as The Hurricane had been attacked earlier that evening by Triple H and Ric Flair and was unable to compete. That match was later nominated as WWE's 2002 "Match of the Year". Kane and The Hurricane lost the World Tag Team Championship to Chris Jericho and Christian the following week on Raw.

Also in October, Kane began feuding with Triple H, leading to a match at No Mercy on October 20 in which both Kane's Intercontinental Championship and Triple H's World Heavyweight Championship were at stake. In the weeks preceding the match, Triple H claimed that, several years earlier, Kane had an unrequited relationship with a woman named Katie Vick. He claimed that after Vick was killed in a car crash, Kane had sex with her. Triple H later threatened to show video footage of Kane committing the act in question. The footage that finally aired showed Triple H (dressed as Kane) simulating mock sex with a mannequin in a casket; Kane's tag team partner The Hurricane responded the following week by showing a video of Triple H (rather, someone wearing a Triple H series of masks) getting an enema. The angle was very unpopular with fans, and was de-emphasised before the title match. Triple H defeated Kane at No Mercy, due to Triple H and Flair cheating, unifying the two titles. On the October 28 episode of Raw, Kane defeated Triple H in a non-title Casket match to end their feud. At Survivor Series on November 17, Kane participated in the first-ever Elimination Chamber match for the World Heavyweight Championship, which was won by Shawn Michaels.

Kane then formed a tag team with Rob Van Dam, with the duo eventually winning the World Tag Team Championship from Chief Morley and Lance Storm in a triple threat elimination match (also involving the Dudley Boyz) on the March 31, 2003, episode of Raw. After they lost their World Tag Team Championship to La Résistance at Bad Blood on June 15, Triple H offered Kane a spot in his stable Evolution. Raw co-general manager Stone Cold Steve Austin offered Kane the opportunity to face Triple H for the World Heavyweight Championship if he rejected Triple H's offer. Co-general manager Eric Bischoff insisted that if Kane lost the match, he would unmask. Kane accepted Austin's offer and challenged Triple H the following week in Madison Square Garden. Triple H won the match following interference from his stablemates, and on the June 23 episode of Raw, Kane removed his mask and chokeslammed Van Dam, turning heel in the process. The unmasking rendered Kane emotionally unstable, and in an interview with Jim Ross on the July 14 episode of Raw, Kane attacked Ross and set him on fire. He later attacked Linda McMahon on the Raw stage the following week. This action sparked a feud between Kane and Shane McMahon, Linda's son, with Kane defeating Shane in a last man standing match at Unforgiven on September 21 and an ambulance match at Survivor Series on November 16. At Survivor Series, Kane also interfered in a Buried Alive match between Vince McMahon and The Undertaker, helping McMahon bury The Undertaker and win the match. On January 25, 2004, Kane took part in the Royal Rumble match; he was eliminated when he heard the bell toll from The Undertaker's entrance music, distracting and distressing Kane, and enabling Booker T to eliminate him. Over the following weeks, Kane repeatedly insisted that The Undertaker was "dead", only to be met with various paranormal incidents such as a rainstorm localized over the ring in which he stood. The Undertaker finally returned at WrestleMania XX on March 14 (again sporting his "Deadman" persona) with Paul Bearer at his side, defeating Kane.

==== Storyline with Lita (2004–2005) ====
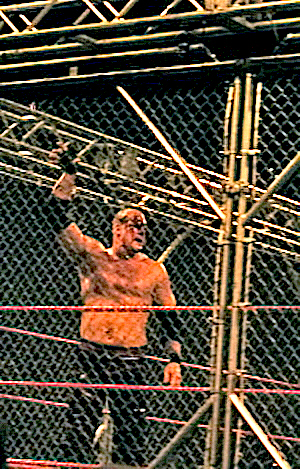
A bloodied Kane in a steel cage match against Edge

After losing at WrestleMania XX, Kane fell in love with Lita, but was spurned. This led to him kidnapping Lita in May, and on the same night, Kane won a 20-man battle royal for a World Heavyweight Championship match against Chris Benoit at Bad Blood on June 13. Six days before Bad Blood in a handicap tag team match between Kane and La Resistance against Edge and Benoit, Kane pinned Benoit, then lost to him at Bad Blood. Lita later announced that she was pregnant, with Matt Hardy her then-boyfriend both on- and off-screen, assuming that he was the child's father. On the June 21 episode of Raw, Kane claimed that he was the father. The next week, he explained that he had impregnated Lita to continue his legacy and justified an attack on Shawn Michaels a week earlier by claiming that Michaels had stood in the way of him winning the World Heavyweight Championship. To appease Kane, General Manager Eric Bischoff gave Kane a rematch with Benoit, instructing Benoit that he could only win by submission, whereas Kane could win the title by any means. Kane again lost to Benoit, and following the match, Lita came to the ring and low-blowed Kane, who initially went to chokeslam her in revenge, but stopped when he realized that she was trying to force him to cause her to miscarry their child.

Kane and Matt Hardy faced one another in a "Till Death Do Us Part" match at SummerSlam on August 15, with Lita obliged to wed the victor. Kane defeated Hardy at SummerSlam, and "married" Lita on the August 23 episode of Raw. Although he was attacked by Hardy during the ceremony, he gained the upper hand and ultimately chokeslammed Hardy off the stage. A week after the wedding, General Manager Eric Bischoff gave Kane and Lita the wedding gift of choosing any match that Kane wanted at Unforgiven on September 12. Shawn Michaels was chosen and defeated Kane in a no-disqualification match at Unforgiven. The next night, on the September 13 episode of Raw, Kane accidentally fell on Lita during a match with the debuting Gene Snitsky, who hit him on the back with a steel chair, ostensibly causing Lita to miscarry. Kane turned face by seeking revenge against Snitsky for causing the death of his child but lost to Snitsky in a steel chain match (which was selected by the fans) at Taboo Tuesday on October 19. Kane was sidelined for several months after Snitsky crushed his larynx with a chair during the match. This storyline gave Jacobs time to complete his role in the film, See No Evil.

Kane returned by defeating Snitsky at New Year's Revolution on January 9, 2005. Kane and Lita reconciled with one another and began antagonizing Lita's rival Trish Stratus. This led to a match between Kane and Stratus' hired bodyguard Viscera at Backlash on May 1 that was won by Kane. Lita later turned on Kane and started an on-screen relationship with her real-life boyfriend at the time Edge. This led to a feud between Kane and Edge, whom Kane defeated at Vengeance on June 26 despite interference from Snitsky. The feud ended when Edge defeated Kane in a Stretcher match on the July 25 episode of Raw.

==== Teaming with Big Show (2005–2006) ====
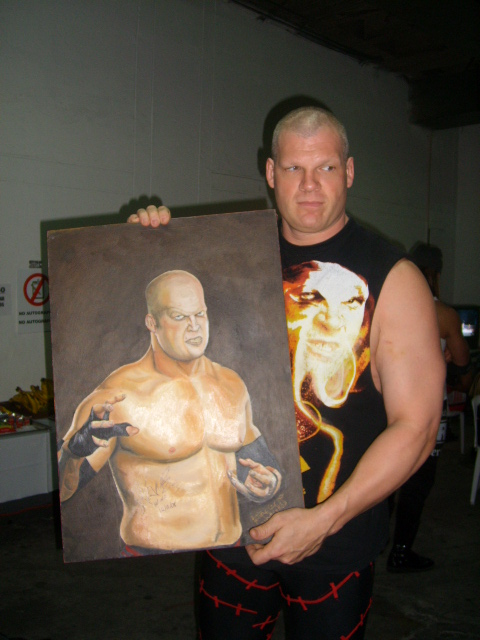
Kane with a portrait done by a fan

Kane returned to WWE television on the October 17 episode of Raw, winning an 18-man battle royal. As a result of his victory, he, along with Big Show and Shawn Michaels, was featured in an Internet poll to decide who would receive a shot at the WWE Championship at Taboo Tuesday on November 1. In the weeks before Taboo Tuesday, Kane and Big Show teamed together on several occasions. The poll was won by Michaels, and Kane and Big Show teamed together to face Lance Cade and Trevor Murdoch, defeating them for the World Tag Team Championship. The duo successfully retained their championship throughout the remainder of 2005, during which time they engaged in an inter-promotional feud with members of the SmackDown! brand. On the December 12 episode of Raw, Kane defeated Triple H in an Elimination Chamber qualifying match, then Kane participated in the Elimination Chamber match for the WWE Championship at New Year's Revolution on January 8, 2006, but he was eliminated by Carlito and Chris Masters. He and Big Show feuded with Carlito and Masters throughout early 2006, culminating in a successful title defense at WrestleMania 22 on April 2. The following evening, Kane and the Big Show lost the World Tag Team Championship to Spirit Squad members Kenny and Mikey. One week later, Kane and Big Show faced Spirit Squad members Johnny and Nicky in a rematch for the title, but were disqualified after Kane "snapped", ostensibly due to "voices in his head".

In subsequent weeks, Kane began attacking anyone who mentioned the date May 19. During the match between Kane and Big Show at Backlash on April 30, Kane's voice began echoing throughout the arena saying "May 19th", "It's happening again" and "They're all going to know", leaving Kane visibly shaken. Big Show then struck Kane with a chair, resulting in a no contest. On May 19, Kane appeared on SmackDown! as John "Bradshaw" Layfield (JBL)'s hand-picked opponent for Rey Mysterio. After the aforementioned voices and mask video began playing, Kane chokeslammed JBL and Mysterio, before leaving the ring. On the following episode of Raw, he claimed that May 19 was the date on which his mother and adopted family were killed in a fire. The voices continued to the May 29 episode of Raw, when Kane was confronted by the source of the voice, an impostor Kane; wearing Kane's old mask and ring attire, he chokeslammed Kane during his match against Shelton Benjamin for the Intercontinental Championship. Kane and the look-alike continued to fight one another in subsequent weeks, leading to a match between the two being scheduled for Vengeance on June 25, in which the real Kane lost to the impostor. On the June 26 episode of Raw, Kane threw the impostor out of the arena and removed his mask, saying "I believe that this is mine". Kane was absent from WWE television for two months thereafter as he toured Europe to promote See No Evil.

Kane returned at SummerSlam on August 20, attacking Umaga, who was interfering in the D-Generation-X versus Mr. McMahon and Shane McMahon tag team match. Upon his return, he faced his former partner Big Show for the ECW World Championship in a losing effort. Soon after, Kane would engage in a major feud with Umaga that concluded on the October 9 episode of Raw in a Loser Leaves Raw match, which he lost.

==== Brothers of Destruction reunion (2006–2007) ====
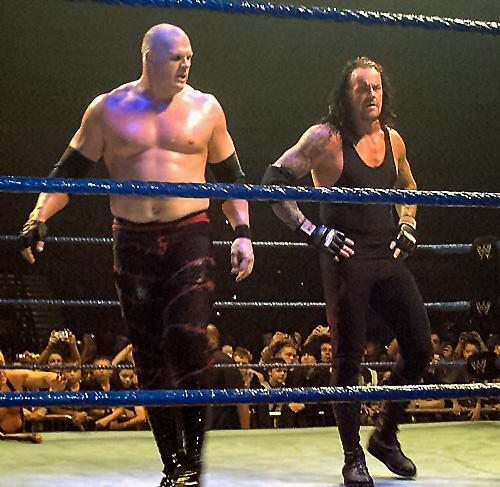
Kane was reunited with The Undertaker when he returned to SmackDown! in 2006

On the October 13 episode of SmackDown!, Kane moved to the SmackDown! brand. On the November 3 episode of SmackDown!, Kane reunited with The Undertaker as The Brothers of Destruction to defeat Montel Vontavious Porter (MVP) and Mr. Kennedy. Kane continued a feud with MVP competing in several gimmick matches. The result of the feud was an Inferno match at Armageddon on December 17; Kane won by setting MVP's back on fire which resulted in first degree burns. On the January 26, 2007, episode of SmackDown!, Kane was involved in a six-man elimination over-the-top-rope battle royal, with King Booker, MVP, The Miz, Chris Benoit, and Finlay. This match went to a no-contest as The Undertaker interrupted after Kane had been eliminated and punished by the remaining opponents.

At the Royal Rumble on January 28, Kane eliminated King Booker, who re-entered the ring and eliminated him. On the February 2 episode of SmackDown!, while receiving the key to the city in his hometown of Houston, King Booker was attacked by Kane starting a feud between the two. At No Way Out on February 18, Kane defeated King Booker. On the February 23 episode of SmackDown!, Kane lost to King Booker in a Falls Count Anywhere Money in the Bank Qualifying match after interference from The Great Khali, sparking a feud between the two. Kane started to walk around with a hook, similar to the hook he used as Jacob Goodnight in See No Evil. At WrestleMania 23 on April 1, Kane lost to Khali. During the match, in homage to Hulk Hogan slamming André the Giant twenty years earlier at WrestleMania III, Kane picked up Khali for the first time and body-slammed him to the mat.

After WrestleMania, he began to feud with William Regal and Dave Taylor. The Boogeyman then joined the feud, teaming up with Kane. On the May 4 episode of SmackDown!, Kane competed in a number one contender's match for the United States Championship against MVP. Kane lost due to interference by Regal and Taylor. On the May 25 episode of SmackDown!, Kane competed in a fatal four-way number one contender's match for the World Heavyweight Championship which was won by Batista. Kane then entered a short feud with Mark Henry, losing to him in a Lumberjack match at One Night Stand on June 3 due to interference from lumberjacks Kenny Dykstra and Chavo Guerrero and then took a short hiatus. On the July 6 episode of SmackDown!, General Manager Theodore Long announced that Kane would face Edge for the World Heavyweight Championship at The Great American Bash on July 22. After Edge was attacked and injured by Kane and the title was vacated, Batista faced Kane in a number one contender's match on the July 20 episode of SmackDown!. During the match, new World Heavyweight Champion The Great Khali interfered by attacking Batista; the match was ruled a no-contest and both men were ruled the number one contenders and were scheduled to face Khali in a triple threat match at The Great American Bash. Khali retained the title after pinning Kane for the win at The Great American Bash. Kane later teamed up with Batista on the August 18 Saturday Night's Main Event to defeat Khali and Finlay. Kane then entered a storyline with Finlay, which led to a match at SummerSlam on August 26, which Kane won after chokeslamming Finlay. They continued to feud, which included Kane losing to Finlay in a number one contender's tournament on the August 31 episode of SmackDown! after interference from Hornswoggle.

Kane then made an appearance on the October 16 episode of ECW as the hand-chosen partner of ECW Champion CM Punk, helping him defeat John Morrison, The Miz, and Big Daddy V in a three-on-two handicap match. In retaliation, Big Daddy V attacked Kane on the October 19 episode of SmackDown!, igniting a feud between the two. The two continued to battle in the following weeks. Kane was voted to face the defending champion MVP for his United States Championship at Cyber Sunday on October 28, which Kane won by countout and thus did not win the title. After this, he continued to feud with Big Daddy V, with the two ending up on opposite teams at Survivor Series on November 18, where Kane's team won. Big Daddy V eventually began to team with Mark Henry, while Kane teamed with CM Punk. The feud concluded at Armageddon on December 16, where Kane and Punk lost to Big Daddy V and Henry after Big Daddy V pinned Punk.

==== ECW Champion (2008–2009) ====
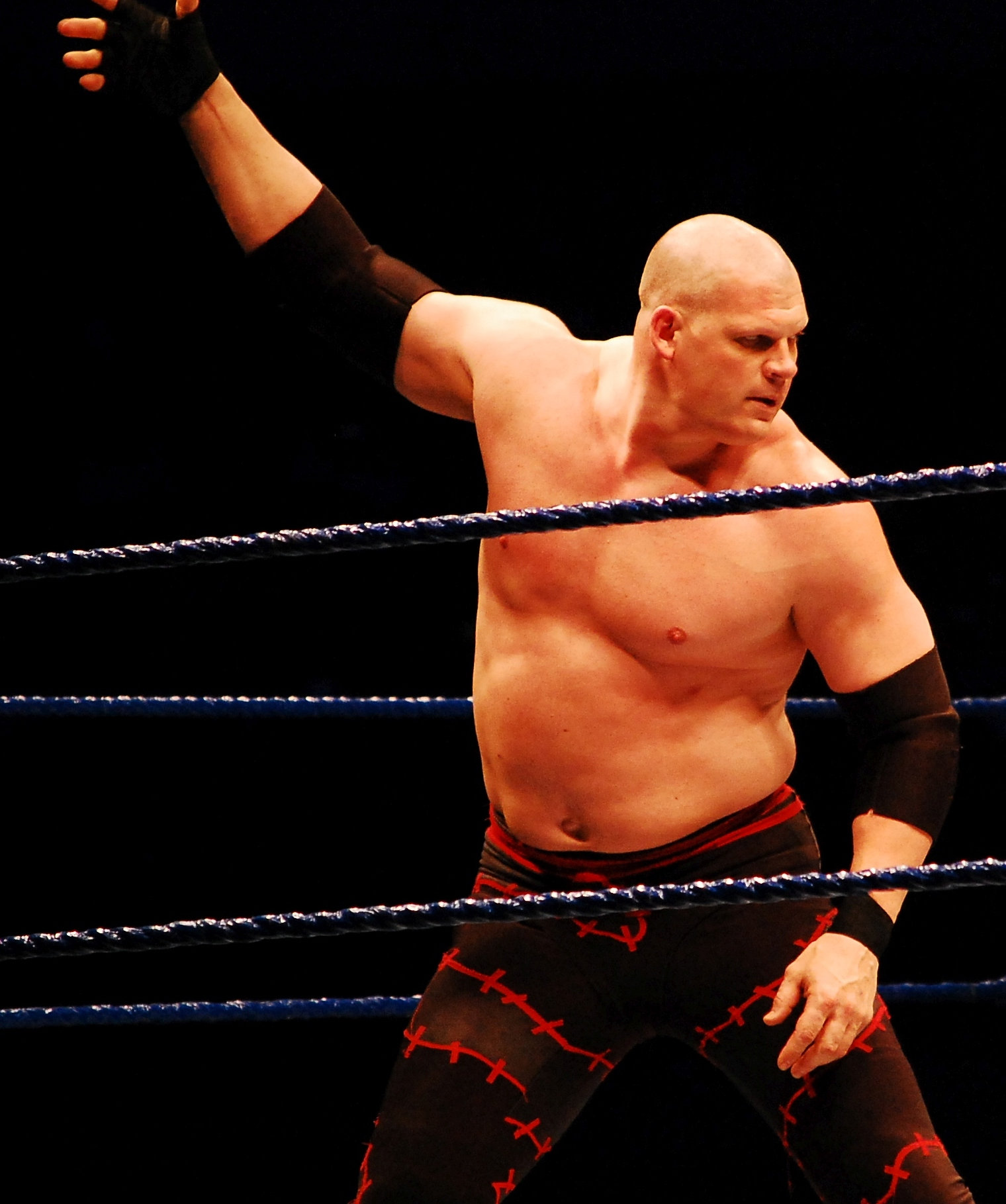
Kane preparing for a chokeslam at a WWE Live Event in February 2008.

In a battle royal before WrestleMania XXIV on March 30, 2008, Kane won by last eliminating former rival Mark Henry, earning a match for the ECW Championship against Chavo Guerrero later that night. Kane defeated Guerrero in the second fastest WrestleMania match with a record-setting eleven seconds to win the ECW Championship. Shortly after winning the championship, Kane officially joined the ECW brand. At Backlash on April 27, Kane successfully defended the ECW Championship against Guerrero. He then continued teaming with CM Punk to earn a WWE Tag Team Championship match at Judgment Day on May 18, which they lost to John Morrison and The Miz. On the June 23 episode of Raw, as part of the 2008 WWE Draft, Kane was drafted to the Raw brand, making the ECW Championship exclusive to Raw. Kane lost the ECW Championship to Mark Henry at Night of Champions on June 29 in a triple threat match that also involved Big Show.

On the July 7 episode of Raw, Kane lost a number one contender's fatal four-way match to Batista (Batista would advance to the World Heavyweight Championship match at The Great American Bash on July 20), leading him to attack commentators Michael Cole and Jerry Lawler, thus turning heel in the process. At The Great American Bash, Kane interfered and attacked both the champion CM Punk and the challenger Batista, causing the match to end in a double disqualification. In September, Kane began a feud with Rey Mysterio that lasted through Survivor Series on November 23. On the March 2, 2009, episode of Raw, Kane pinned Mike Knox in a triple threat match, also involving Rey Mysterio, to earn a spot in the Money in the Bank ladder match at WrestleMania 25 on April 5, a match ultimately won by CM Punk. During the 2009 draft Kane beat The Brian Kendrick for a draft pick and, later in the night, was drafted to the SmackDown brand. There, Kane feuded with CM Punk and defeated him at Backlash on April 26. He then took a break to tour India and also heal injuries, returning at The Bash on June 28 to assist Dolph Ziggler in his match with The Great Khali by hitting Khali with a steel chair, allowing Ziggler to win. This started a feud with Khali, whom he defeated at SummerSlam on August 23 and in a Singapore Cane match at Breaking Point on September 13. Alongside Chris Jericho, Kane was co-captain for the victorious Team SmackDown at Bragging Rights on October 25. On the October 30 episode of SmackDown, Kane then unsuccessfully challenged Jericho in a number one contender's match for an opportunity to face World Heavyweight Champion The Undertaker and Big Show in a triple threat match at Survivor Series on November 22. In November, Kane reunited with The Undertaker to feud with Big Show and Jericho, thus turning face.

==== World Heavyweight Champion (2010–2011) ====
At WrestleMania XXVI on March 28, 2010, during the Money in the Bank ladder match, Kane was unsuccessful in claiming the briefcase as Jack Swagger won the match. Over the next few months, Kane was involved in sporadic singles matches on episodes of SmackDown, including a loss to CM Punk in May in a qualifying match for the World Heavyweight Championship match for the Fatal 4-Way pay-per-view event on June 20. On the June 4 episode of SmackDown, Kane stated he had found his brother The Undertaker in a "vegetative state" over Memorial Day weekend and vowed revenge on whoever was responsible. Due to Undertaker's injury, a battle royal was held to determine his replacement for Fatal 4-Way, which Rey Mysterio won by last eliminating Kane. Mysterio would go on to win the match at Fatal 4-Way. Kane participated in the SmackDown Money in the Bank ladder match at the first Money in the Bank pay-per-view on July 18. He won the match, and cashed in his Money in the Bank contract later that night, defeating Rey Mysterio (who had just defeated Jack Swagger) to win the World Heavyweight Championship, thus making Kane the first wrestler in WWE history to win the WWE Championship, the ECW Championship, and the World Heavyweight Championship. He became the first wrestler to cash in the Money in the Bank contract on the same night it was won and also holds the record for the fastest cash in at 47 minutes. On the next SmackDown on July 23, Kane accused Mysterio of putting The Undertaker in a vegetative state; Mysterio countered the accusations, claiming that Kane himself was the perpetrator. At SummerSlam on August 15, Kane retained the World Heavyweight Championship against Mysterio, and following their match, The Undertaker appeared. Kane was revealed as The Undertaker's attacker, thus turning heel once again and reigniting their feud. He successfully defended the World Heavyweight Championship against The Undertaker in a No Holds Barred match at Night of Champions on September 19. On the following episode of SmackDown, a casket was brought to ringside by druids to reveal the return of Paul Bearer, supporting The Undertaker. At Hell in a Cell on October 3, Bearer turned on The Undertaker and allied himself with Kane, who retained the World Heavyweight Championship in a Hell in a Cell match with Bearer's help. At Bragging Rights on October 24, Kane defeated The Undertaker in a Buried Alive match after help from The Nexus to retain the World Heavyweight Championship once again, thus ending their feud.

Kane then rekindled his feud with Edge, who on the October 29 episode of SmackDown was named the new challenger to Kane's World Heavyweight Championship at Survivor Series on November 21. On the November 12 episode of SmackDown, Edge kidnapped Bearer and started to play mind games with Kane, trying to psychologically wear him down before their title match. At Survivor Series, Kane retained his title after the referee determined the match a draw due to both men pinning each other at the same time. As Edge still had Bearer in his captivity, Kane agreed to a rematch at the TLC: Tables, Ladders & Chairs pay-per-view on December 19. On the December 3 episode of SmackDown, Edge defeated Kane in a non-title match to win the right to determine the stipulation for the title match; Edge chose a Tables, Ladders and Chairs match before leaving Kane with a Paul Bearer lookalike and driving away with the genuine Bearer strapped to the back of a truck. The following week, Kane accidentally injured Bearer, believing it to be another hoax by Edge, and Bearer was written out of the storyline. The week after, Kane rampaged into the stadium to hunt down Edge hoping to get back at him but the two were nearly restrained by the entire Smackdown roster. At TLC, Kane lost the World Heavyweight Championship to Edge in a four-way Tables, Ladders and Chairs match also involving Mysterio and Alberto Del Rio. Kane received his rematch for the World Heavyweight Championship on the January 7, 2011, episode of SmackDown in a Last Man Standing match, but was unsuccessful.

Kane competed in the Royal Rumble match on January 30, the largest Royal Rumble match in history, and was the 40th and final person to enter the match, but was eliminated by Rey Mysterio. Kane then competed in the Elimination Chamber match for the World Heavyweight Championship at Elimination Chamber on February 20, eliminating Drew McIntyre and Big Show before being eliminated by Edge. The following month, Kane reunited with the Big Show against a common enemy, The Corre, thus turning face once again in the process. Kane and Big Show began challenging them for the tag team titles and saving other wrestlers from their attacks. At WrestleMania XXVII on April 3, Big Show and Kane teamed with Santino Marella and Kofi Kingston to beat The Corre. The next week, a rematch took place under two out of three falls rules, which Kane's team won. On the April 22 episode of SmackDown, the duo defeated Corre members Justin Gabriel and Heath Slater to win the WWE Tag Team Championship, their second championship as a team. Big Show and Kane then started feuding with the New Nexus. After defending the titles against CM Punk and Mason Ryan at Over the Limit on May 22, Kane and Big Show lost the championship to Michael McGillicutty and David Otunga the following night on Raw. The team disbanded after the match, as Big Show suffered an injury. Kane participated in the second annual SmackDown Money in the Bank ladder match at Money in the Bank on July 17, but the match was won by Daniel Bryan. On the July 22 episode of SmackDown after losing a street fight to Randy Orton, Kane was attacked by Mark Henry, who injured his leg with a steel chair. WWE reported the attack had fractured Kane's fibula, likely to sideline him for five months.

==== Remasking (2011–2012) ====
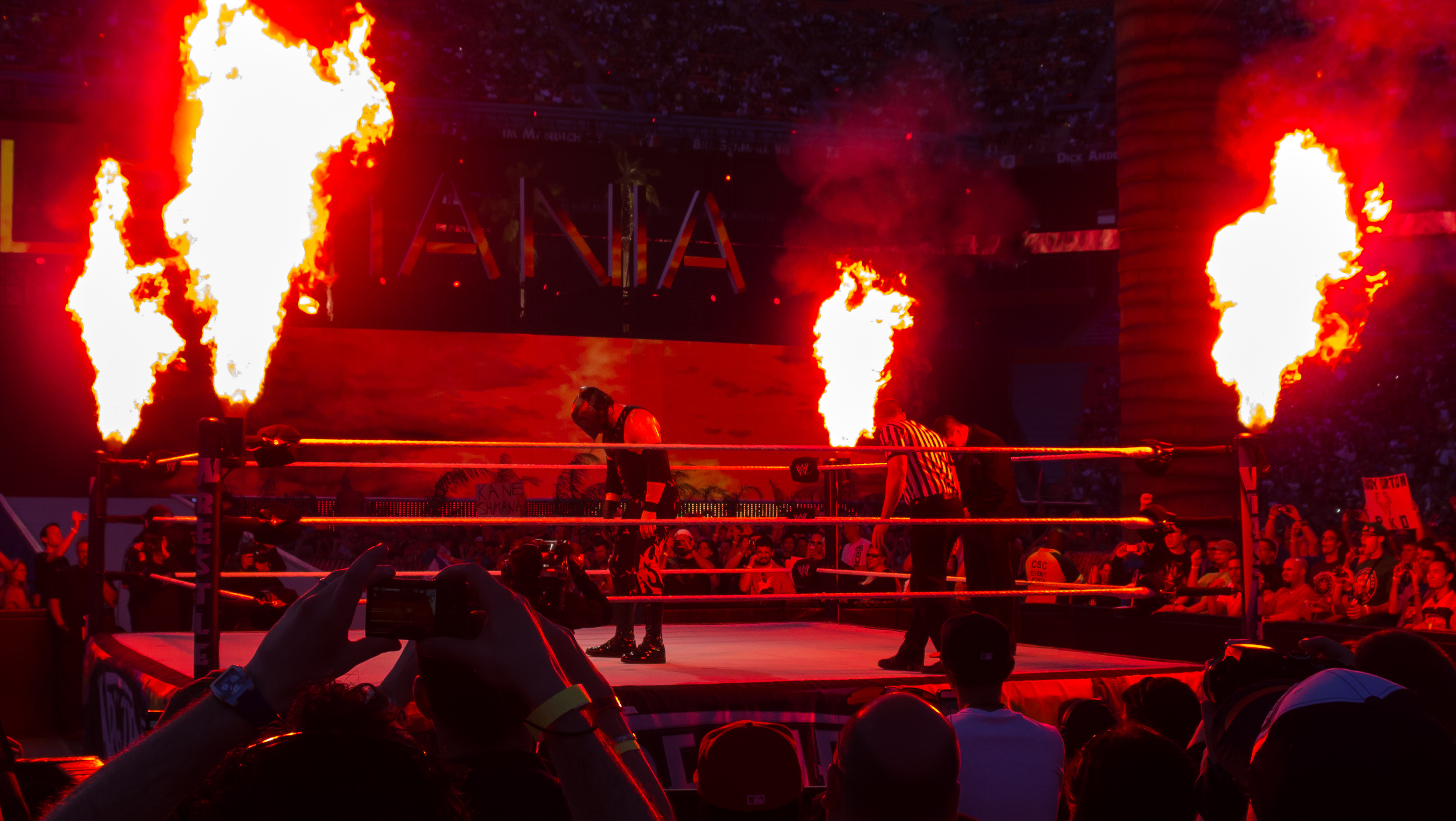
Kane performing his signature fire pyro at WrestleMania XXVIII in April 2012.

Beginning in November, WWE began airing vignettes featuring Kane and a burning red mask and ending with the words "Kane Resurrected" appearing on screen. Kane returned on the December 12 episode of Raw SuperShow wearing a metallic mask and new ring attire inspired by the incisions of a postmortem human body after an autopsy. He interrupted the main event between Mark Henry and John Cena, attacking Cena before removing the metallic mask to reveal a new red mask and turning heel once again. Kane continued to attack Cena in the following weeks, claiming he wanted Cena to "embrace the hate" from Cena's detractors, rather than try to "Rise Above Hate", as Cena's T-shirt proclaimed. Kane also attacked and injured Cena's ally Zack Ryder. Kane and Cena fought to a double countout at the Royal Rumble on January 29, 2012. After the match, Kane attacked Ryder with a Tombstone Piledriver and then he chokeslammed Cena. On February 19 at Elimination Chamber, Cena defeated Kane in an Ambulance match to end the feud. In March, Kane initiated a feud with Randy Orton by attacking him. Kane later explained that he needed to feel like a monster again, and believed that defeating Orton would allow him to do that. Orton retaliated in the following weeks, leading to a match at WrestleMania XXVIII on April 1, which Kane won. In a rematch on the following SmackDown, Orton defeated Kane in a No Disqualification match. After Kane attacked Orton and his father, "Cowboy" Bob Orton, the pair faced off at Extreme Rules on April 29, in a Falls Count Anywhere match, which Orton won by utilizing a steel chair. At the Over the Limit preshow on May 20, Kane defeated Zack Ryder.

==== Team Hell No (2012–2013) ====
Kane then engaged in a three-way feud with WWE Champion CM Punk and Daniel Bryan after Bryan interfered in a non-title match between Kane and Punk to frame Punk for attacking Kane with a steel chair. On the June 1 episode of SmackDown, a WWE Championship match between Kane and Punk ended in a double disqualification after Bryan attacked both men. On the June 4 episode of Raw SuperShow, Kane beat CM Punk in a non-title match. Meanwhile, Bryan's jilted ex-girlfriend AJ Lee turned her affections to both Punk and Kane. The feud culminated in a triple threat match at No Way Out on June 17, where Punk retained the WWE Championship after AJ distracted Kane. On the 1000th episode of Raw on July 23, Kane turned face once again when he was saved by his brother The Undertaker from an attack by Jinder Mahal, Drew McIntyre, Tyler Reks, Curt Hawkins, Hunico and Camacho. At SummerSlam on August 19, Kane was defeated by Bryan.

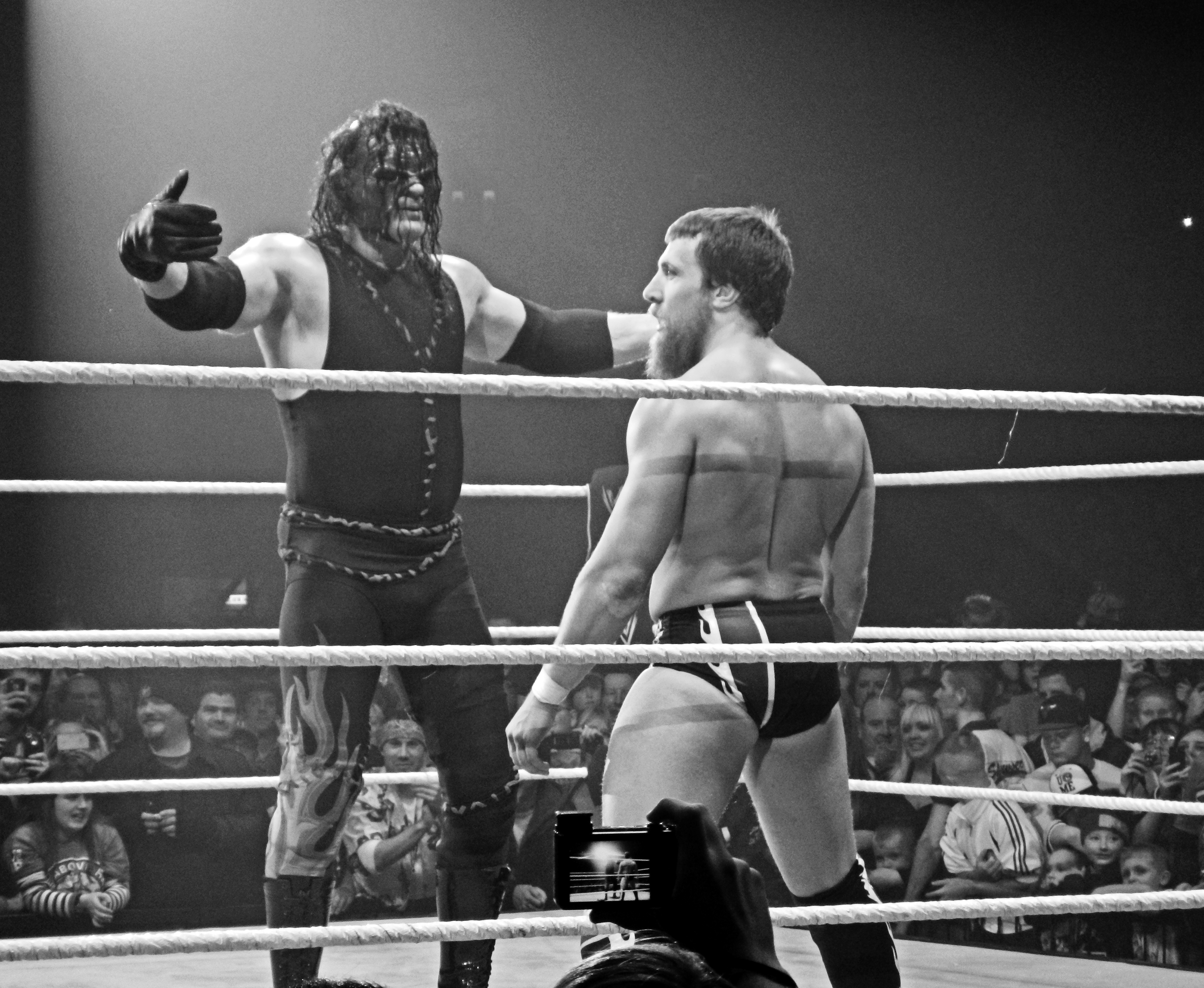
Kane offering to "hug it out" with Daniel Bryan

As a result of Bryan and Kane's issues, AJ enrolled them in anger management classes hosted by Dr. Shelby and they were later forced to compete in a "Hug it Out" match. At the arrangement of Dr. Shelby and AJ, the two adversaries formed a team whose constant infighting during matches inadvertently resulted in them defeating The Prime Time Players (Titus O'Neil and Darren Young) to become the number one contenders to the WWE Tag Team Championship, and defeating champions Kofi Kingston and R-Truth to win the titles at Night of Champions on September 16. Kane and Bryan made their first successful title defense the following night on Raw, defeating the former champions in a rematch. The following week on Raw, "Team Hell No" was chosen as the official team name via a Twitter poll. Team Hell No entered a feud with Team Rhodes Scholars (Cody Rhodes and Damien Sandow), and successfully defended the championship against them on multiple occasions (including at Hell in a Cell on October 28 and the November 14 episode of Main Event). On the November 26 episode of Raw, both Kane and Bryan were assaulted by The Shield (Dean Ambrose, Seth Rollins, and Roman Reigns). Team Hell No allied with Ryback to face The Shield, but lost a Tables, Ladders, and Chairs match at TLC: Tables, Ladders & Chairs on December 16. Further successful title defenses against Team Rhodes Scholars and 3 MB (Drew McIntyre and Heath Slater) followed throughout December and January 2013. On the February 11 episode of Raw, Kane defeated Dolph Ziggler to earn the final spot in the number one contender Elimination Chamber match for the World Heavyweight Championship, but was the second man eliminated from the match at the Elimination Chamber pay-per-view on February 17. On April 7 at WrestleMania 29, Team Hell No defeated Dolph Ziggler and Big E Langston in another successful title defense. Following WrestleMania, Team Hell No rekindled their rivalry with The Shield after they saved The Undertaker from The Shield. On the April 22 episode of Raw, Team Hell No and The Undertaker were defeated by the Shield in a six-man tag team match. Kane and Bryan then faced members of the stable in both tag team and singles competition, but were mainly unsuccessful. On May 19 at Extreme Rules, Kane and Bryan lost the WWE Tag Team Championship to Shield members Seth Rollins and Roman Reigns, ending their reign at 245 days. Team Hell No lost their WWE Tag Team Championship rematch against Reigns and Rollins on the May 27 episode of Raw. On the June 14 episode of SmackDown, Kane, Bryan and Randy Orton ended the Shield's unpinned/unsubmitted streak in televised six-man tag matches. Kane unsuccessfully challenged Dean Ambrose for the United States Championship at Payback on June 16 and the following night on Raw.

On the July 8 episode of Raw, Kane beat Christian in a Money in the Bank qualifying match, then he was attacked and injured by the debuting Wyatt Family, removing him from his scheduled match at Money in the Bank on July 14. Kane returned three weeks later, losing to Bryan. Following the match, he was attacked again by The Wyatt Family, setting up a Ring of Fire match at SummerSlam on August 18 against Bray Wyatt. Kane lost the match, following interference from Erick Rowan and Luke Harper, and after another attack, he was carried out of the arena by The Wyatt Family. The storyline was put in place to allow Jacobs time off to film See No Evil 2.

==== The Authority (2013–2015) ====
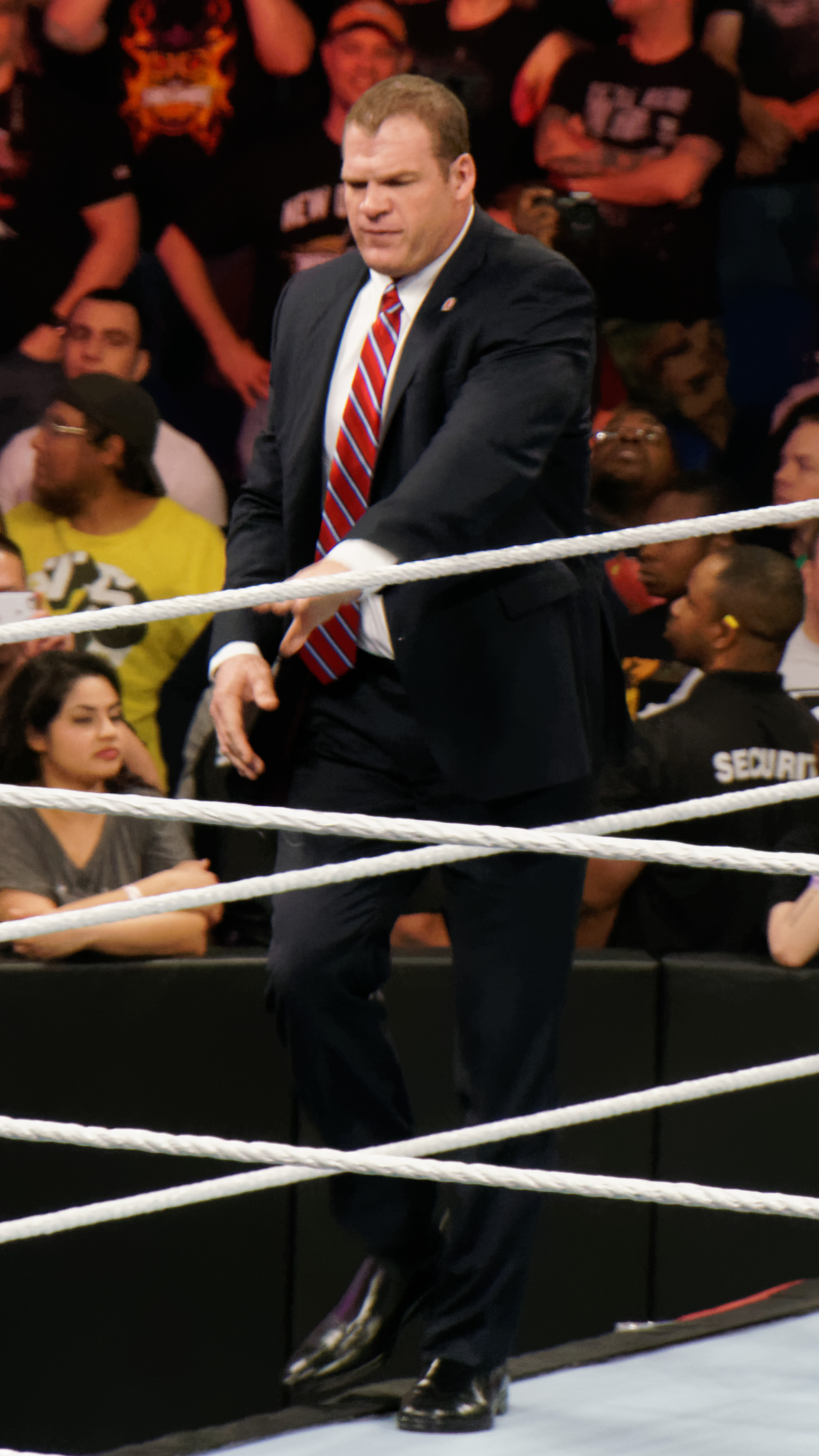
Kane as The Authority's Director of Operations in 2014

Following a two-month hiatus, Kane returned at Hell in a Cell on October 27, attacking both The Wyatt Family and The Miz. The next night on Raw, Kane pledged allegiance to Stephanie McMahon by handing her his mask, and reinforced his loyalty the next week by aiding members of The Authority, turning heel in the process. As part of his character change, he appeared unmasked and wore a suit and tie to fit in with the corporate ideology of The Authority, and was given a fictional role as "Director of Operations". When appearing in a suit and tie Kane was referred to as "Corporate Kane." Kane participated in the Royal Rumble match at the Royal Rumble on January 26, 2014, and was eliminated by CM Punk. He reappeared later during the match, eliminating Punk to tie the record for most eliminations in the Royal Rumble match; his 13-year-old record for most eliminations in a single Rumble was broken by Roman Reigns. Kane then involved himself in The Authority's feud with Daniel Bryan, which included Kane booking himself in a match with Bryan on the February 17 episode of Raw and interfering in the WWE World Heavyweight Championship Elimination Chamber match at Elimination Chamber on February 23 (where Randy Orton was defending his championship against Bryan, John Cena, Sheamus, Cesaro, and Christian.)

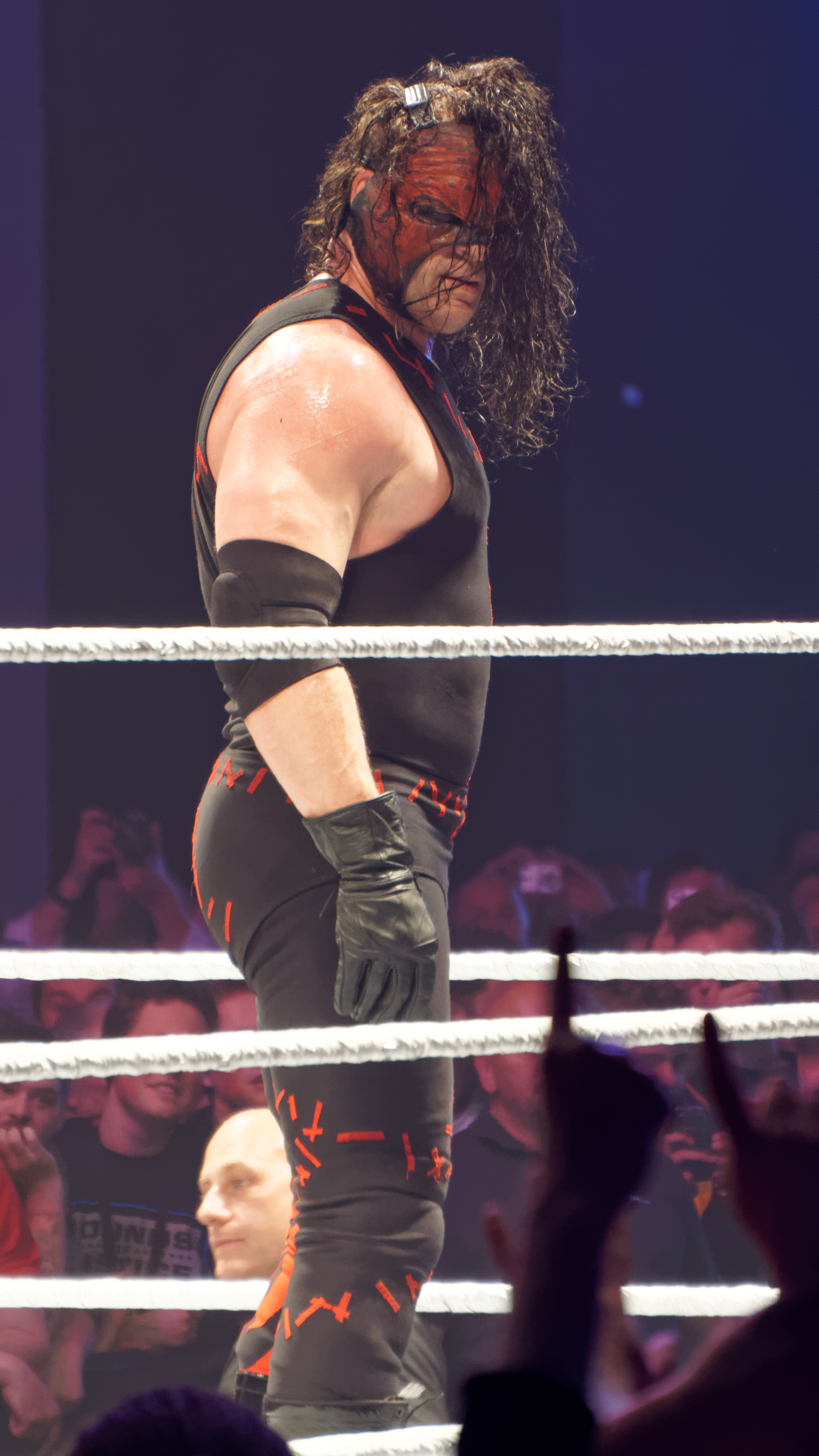
Kane after his second remasking in 2014

Following WrestleMania XXX on April 6, after Kane and The New Age Outlaws lost to The Shield, Kane was berated by Stephanie McMahon and told to find the "Big Red Monster" that he was before. He returned to his masked self that same week, attacking Big Show following the April 15 episode of Main Event. On the April 21 episode of Raw, Stephanie McMahon announced Kane as the number one contender to the WWE World Heavyweight Championship at Extreme Rules on May 4, prompting Kane to attack champion Daniel Bryan and his wife Brie Bella. Kane lost his title match to Bryan at Extreme Rules. At Money in the Bank on June 29, Kane helped Seth Rollins win his Money in the Bank contract, and then he competed in a WWE World Heavyweight Championship ladder match, which was won by John Cena. At Battleground on July 20, Kane competed in a WWE World Heavyweight Championship fatal four-way match against John Cena, Randy Orton, and Roman Reigns, but Cena retained the title. On the July 28 episode of Raw, Kane was scheduled to face Roman Reigns, but Kane and Randy Orton attacked Reigns before the match began.

On the August 4 episode of Raw, after Kane lost to Roman Reigns in a Last Man Standing match, he relinquished his mask and gave it to Stephanie McMahon. The following week on Raw, Kane resumed his role as The Authority's Director of Operations. At Survivor Series on November 23, Kane was part of Team Authority in the main event, and was eliminated by Dolph Ziggler, who ultimately won the match for Team Cena. After Survivor Series, he began feuding with Ryback, which led to a chairs match between the two at TLC: Tables, Ladders & Chairs on December 14, where Ryback emerged victorious. At the Royal Rumble on January 25, 2015, Kane eliminated four superstars, thus surpassing the record for most overall eliminations in the Royal Rumble match. At Fastlane on February 22, Kane, Big Show, and Seth Rollins defeated Dolph Ziggler, Erick Rowan, and Ryback, after Kane pinned Ziggler. Kane participated in the 2nd Annual André the Giant Memorial Battle Royal at WrestleMania 31 on March 29, and was eliminated by Cesaro. At Extreme Rules on April 26, Kane served as the "gatekeeper" for the WWE World Heavyweight Championship Steel Cage match between Seth Rollins and Randy Orton, which Rollins won by escaping the cage. At Payback on May 17, Kane secured his role as Director of Operations by helping Rollins retain his title in a fatal four-way match against Dean Ambrose, Randy Orton, and Roman Reigns. At Money in the Bank on June 14, Kane participated in the Money in the Bank ladder match, which was won by Sheamus. On the July 13 episode of Raw, Kane was injured by Brock Lesnar, who smashed his ankle with the steel ring steps. Following the attack, Rollins berated Kane and kicked his injured ankle. Kane returned at Night of Champions on September 20 with his mask as his "Demon" persona, preventing Sheamus from cashing in his Money in the Bank contract and attacking Seth Rollins, thus turning face in the process. Kane appeared as both his "Demon" and "Corporate" personas and continued his feud with Rollins, defeating him in a lumberjack match on the October 12 episode of Raw. "Demon" Kane lost his WWE World Heavyweight Championship match against Rollins at Hell in a Cell on October 25, and as per the stipulation, "Corporate" Kane was fired from his role as The Authority's Director of Operations.

==== Tag team reunions (2015–2020) ====
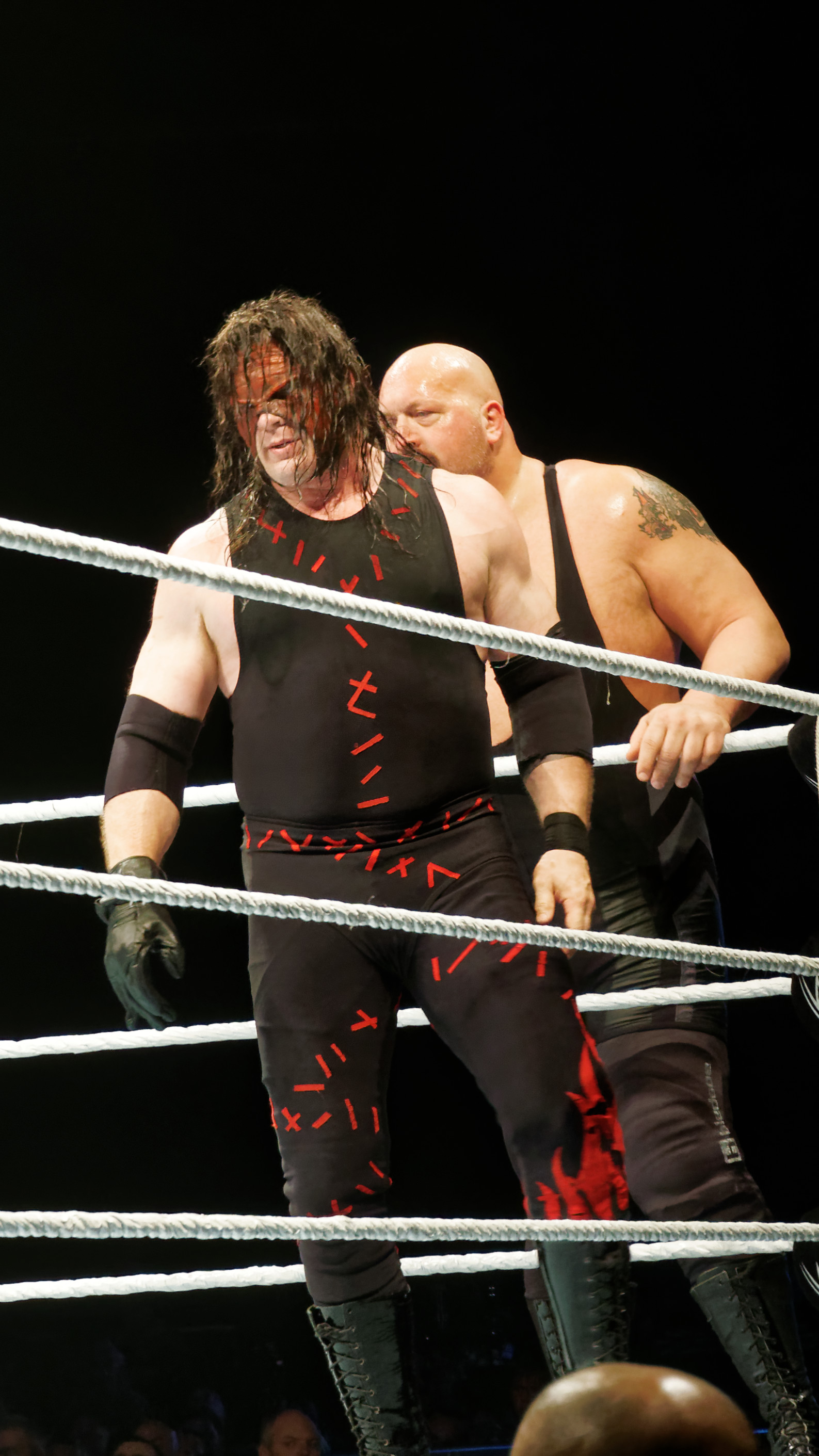
Kane reformed his alliance with Big Show during a feud with The Wyatt Family in 2016

Following Hell in a Cell, Kane reunited with The Undertaker to feud with The Wyatt Family. At Survivor Series on November 22, The Brothers of Destruction defeated Bray Wyatt and Luke Harper in a tag team match. Kane was the seventh entrant in the Royal Rumble match on January 24, 2016, and was eliminated by Braun Strowman. At Fastlane on February 21, Kane teamed up with Big Show and Ryback to defeat The Wyatt Family. At WrestleMania 32 on April 3, Kane participated in the André the Giant Memorial Battle Royal, and was the runner-up, being eliminated by eventual winner Baron Corbin. On July 19 at the 2016 WWE draft, Kane was drafted to the SmackDown brand. At Backlash on September 11, Kane defeated Bray Wyatt following interference by Randy Orton. At Survivor Series on November 20, Kane defeated Luke Harper on the kick-off show. A rematch between the two was made on the November 29 episode of SmackDown Live, in which Kane was once again victorious.

On the October 16, 2017, episode of Raw, after ten months of inactivity, Kane made a surprise return when he came from under the ring to attack Roman Reigns, costing him a Steel Cage match against Braun Strowman and joining The Miz's team at TLC: Tables, Ladders & Chairs on October 22, thus moving to the Raw brand and turning heel in the process. At TLC, Kane, The Miz, Strowman, and The Bar were originally scheduled to compete in a 5-on-3 handicap TLC match against The Shield, but Reigns was sidelined due to real-life illness. Donning the signature Shield ring attire, Kurt Angle took Reigns' place in the match as an honorary member of The Shield alongside Seth Rollins and Dean Ambrose. Kane, Miz, Strowman and The Bar lost the match after Kane, Miz and The Bar betrayed Strowman. After defeating the likes of Finn Bálor and Seth Rollins, Kane engaged in a feud with Strowman. On the December 11 episode of Raw, Kane and Strowman fought to a double countout in a match to determine the number one contender to Brock Lesnar's Universal Championship. At the Royal Rumble on January 28, 2018, Lesnar retained his title in a triple threat match against both Kane and Strowman. Kane was written off television after losing a Last Man Standing match against Strowman the following night on Raw. He returned on the March 19 episode of Raw and chokeslammed John Cena after Cena called out The Undertaker. The following week on Raw, Kane lost to Cena in a no disqualification match. At WrestleMania 34 on April 8, Kane participated in the André the Giant Memorial Battle Royal, and lasted until the final four but was ultimately unsuccessful.

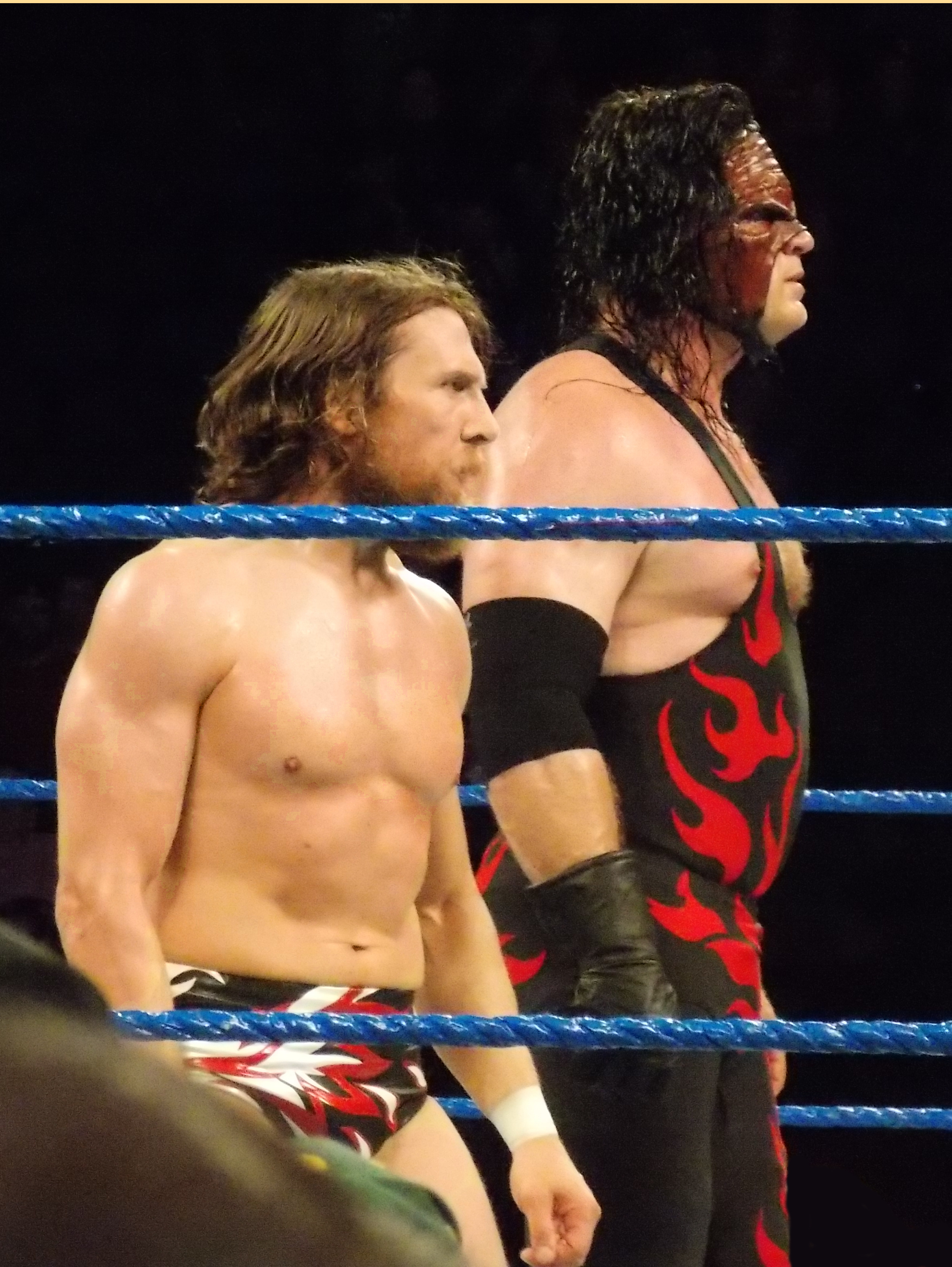
Kane and Bryan during their second reunion in 2018

Kane returned as a face on the June 26 episode of SmackDown Live and saved Daniel Bryan from SmackDown Tag Team Champions The Bludgeon Brothers, thus reuniting Team Hell No. At Extreme Rules on July 15, Team Hell No lost to The Bludgeon Brothers in a SmackDown Tag Team Championship match after Kane was attacked by his opponents backstage.

Kane made his return on the October 1 episode of Raw and reunited with The Undertaker to feud with Triple H and Shawn Michaels. At Super Show-Down in Melbourne, Australia on October 6, The Undertaker was defeated by Triple H following interference by Michaels. After the match, Kane and The Undertaker attacked Michaels and Triple H, setting up a tag team match between The Brothers of Destruction and D-Generation X (DX) at Crown Jewel on November 2. At Crown Jewel, despite dominating most of the match, the Brothers of Destruction lost to DX after Triple H pinned Kane.

On the September 16, 2019, episode of Raw, Kane returned after a hiatus of nearly a year this time under his real name, and he pinned R-Truth to capture the 24/7 Championship, his only championship won under his real name, but dropped the title back to R-Truth. Later that night, his Kane persona reemerged and saved Universal Champion Seth Rollins from The O.C. (AJ Styles, Luke Gallows, and Karl Anderson) and Raw Tag Team Champions Dolph Ziggler and Robert Roode, but was subsequently attacked by "The Fiend" Bray Wyatt. Kane returned on the January 17, 2020, episode of SmackDown, where he was interrupted by The Fiend, but Daniel Bryan would attack The Fiend with a running knee and the two would subsequently have a brief reunion afterwards. At Survivor Series on November 22, he made an appearance during The Undertaker's retirement ceremony.

==== WWE Hall of Famer (2021–present) ====
At Royal Rumble on January 31, 2021, Kane appeared as a surprise entrant in the Royal Rumble match, eliminating Dolph Ziggler and Ricochet before being eliminated by Damian Priest. On March 24, 2021, it was announced that Kane would be inducted into the WWE Hall of Fame as part of the class of 2021. Kane's induction was completed on April 1, 2021. On September 17, prior to SmackDown, Kane presented Bianca Belair with a proclamation from the Tennessee Senate. He later appeared during SmackDown during in-ring celebrations. Kane attended the 2022 WWE Hall of Fame in recognition of The Undertaker headlining the ceremony. On the April 25, 2022, episode of Raw, Kane made brief cameo appearances in two separate backstage segments involving Bianca Belair and Randy Orton. Kane made a surprise appearance at the 2022 SummerSlam event announcing the shows attendance, then delivered his signature ring pyro before leaving the ring.

== Professional wrestling style and persona ==
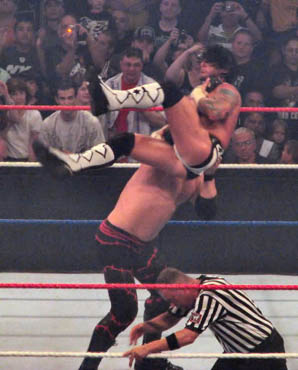
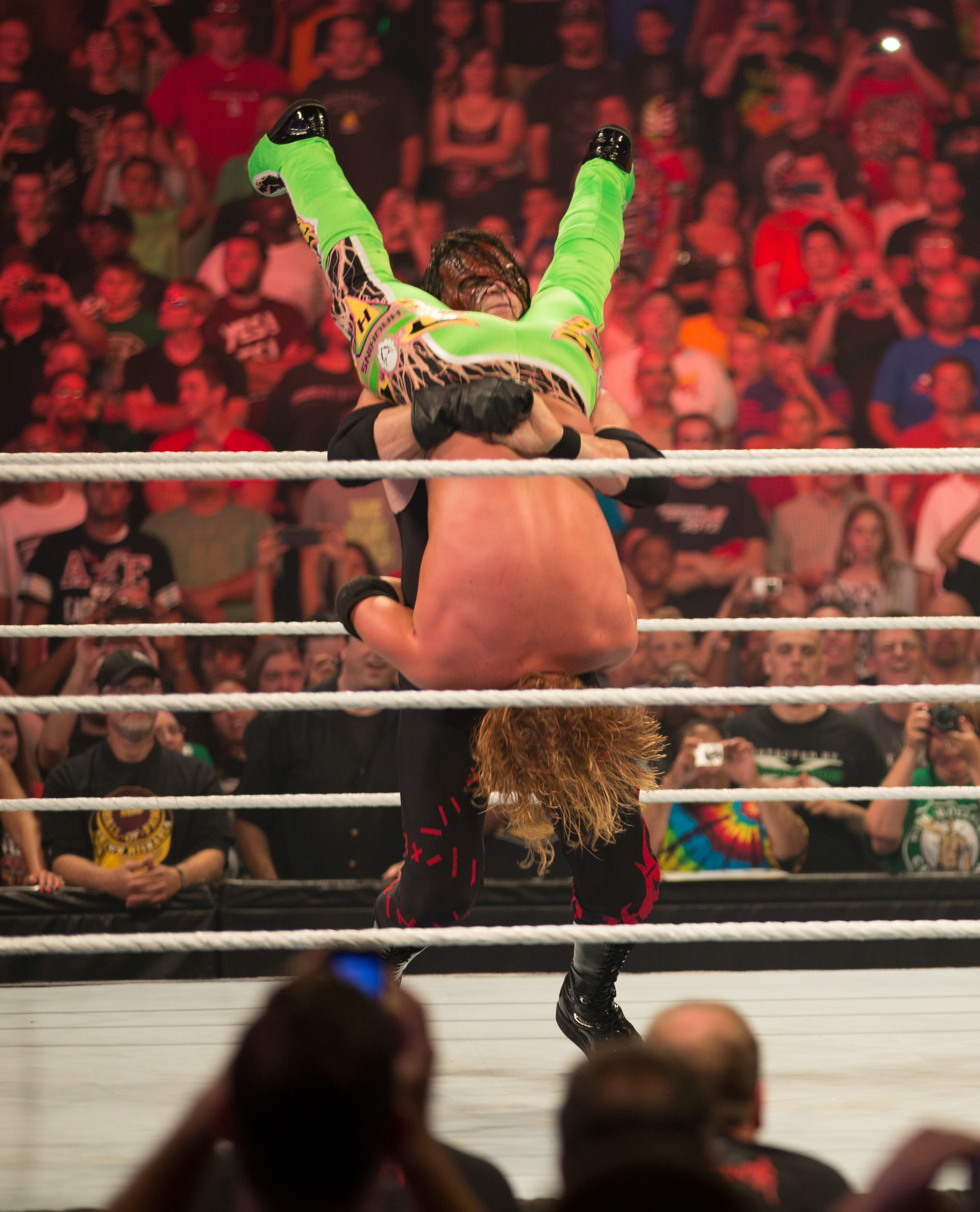
Kane performing his finishing moves, the chokeslam (left, 2008) and the Tombstone Piledriver (right, 2012)

Upon his debut in the WWF, Jacobs portrayed a dental hygienist named Dr. Isaac Yankem; during this time he used a snap DDT as his finishing move. He later portrayed the Diesel character popularized by Kevin Nash following Nash's departure to WCW in 1996; during this time he used a release powerbomb.

Upon his repackaging as Kane in 1997, Jacobs proceeded to utilize the chokeslam and the tombstone piledriver as finishers, taking after his older half-brother in storyline, The Undertaker. In 2001, Jacobs adopted a falling powerbomb as a finisher, reminiscent of The Undertaker's "Last Ride". He was nicknamed "The Big Red Machine", "The (Devil's Favorite) Demon", and "The (Big Red) Monster" to emphasize his monstrous/demonic persona. His character wore a full mask before replacing it with a half mask in 2002. Kane appeared unmasked from 2003 until 2011 when he returned with a new half mask. Under his time in The Authority, Kane relinquished his mask and wore a suit and tie in a persona known as "Corporate Kane" where he also wrestled in dark slacks with elbow pads, though he later reverted to his attire and mask. In 2012, a WWE article ranked him as the 41st best wrestling villain in history.

In 2019, Jacobs altered his "Big Red Machine" nickname into "Big Red Mayor" when doing a Twitter AMA.

== Legacy ==
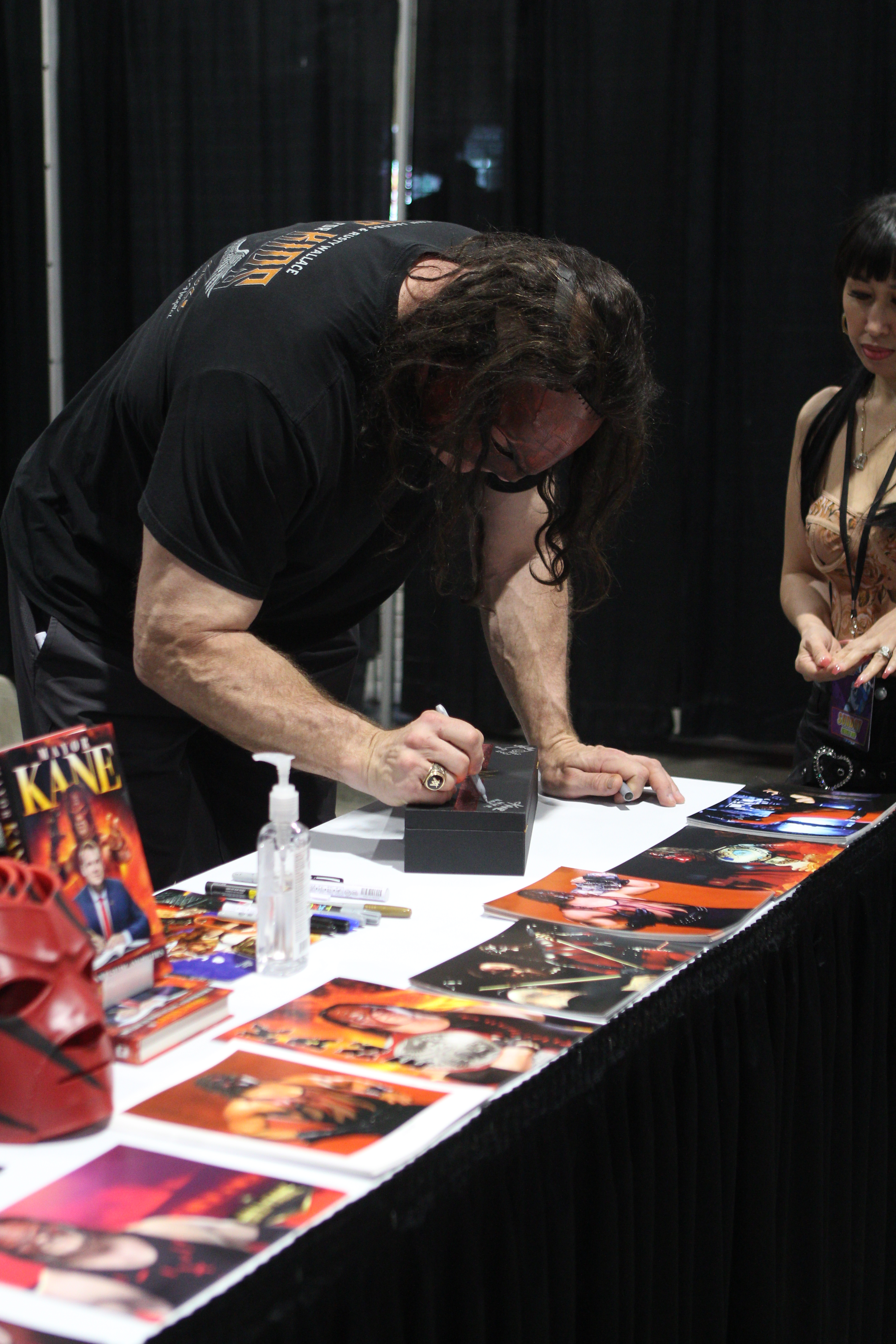
Kane signing autographs for fans in 2025

Many WWE wrestlers have described Kane as one the best wrestlers of all time. Veteran wrestler Ric Flair described Kane as "the best in the world", while Big Show dubbed him "the best big man ever".

Following the announcement of Kane entering the WWE Hall of Fame, many wrestlers paid tribute to Kane calling him "one of the greatest in and out of the ring" and a "true leader". Booker T described Kane as a “good worker” and someone who was always willing to go the extra mile and could be used on any show. The Undertaker stated during an episode of the Six Feet Under podcast that if he were to start a wrestling promotion, the first person he would pick would be Kane. Undertaker observed: If I was to start a wrestling company and I had to pick my first guy, I would pick Kane. One, he can work with anybody. Two, he knows exactly what his gimmick is, he knows what his gimmick isn't. Three, he's going to do business. And four, he's a human being that people wish their kids to be. I mean, so you have all of those things with him. You have pretty much the total package."

In 2011, Bleacher Report included Kane on their list of the 100 greatest wrestlers of all time calling him "a great performer." Similarly Sports Illustrated also included him on their 2016, list of the 101 greatest wrestlers of all time. In the WWE’s official list of the 30 best big men of all time Kane ranked at number 4 being dubbed "the most adaptable big man that ever was."

Kane holds several records at the Royal Rumble, including the record for the most appearances in a Royal Rumble match at 20, the quickest elimination of another competitor at 1.9 seconds and the highest cumulative total eliminations at 46, a record he has held since the 2015 Royal Rumble. Kane also still holds the record for the shortest Money in the Bank cash-in in history, where he cashed in on Rey Mysterio just 50 minutes after winning the contract at the 2010 event. This also made Kane the first male wrestler to ever to cash-in on the same night.

== Political career ==
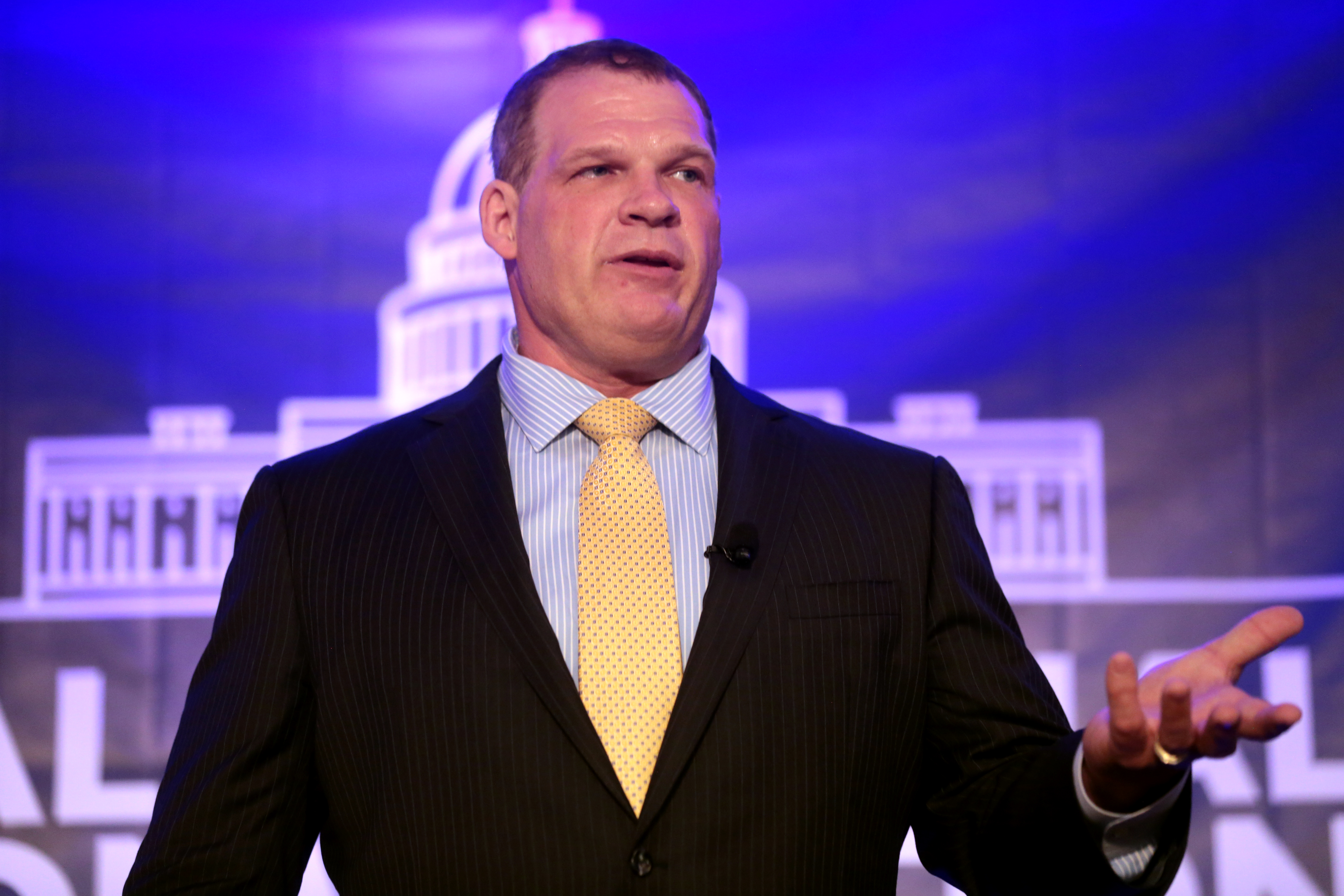
Jacobs speaking with attendees at the 2017 Young Americans for Liberty National Convention at the Sheraton Reston Hotel in Reston, Virginia

Jacobs is actively involved in libertarian politics and publishes his views via a blog. He supported Texas Congressman Ron Paul for president in 2008. He is a member of the Free State Project and delivered a speech at the organization's 2009 New Hampshire Liberty Forum. He has also spoken at the Ludwig von Mises Institute, an anarcho-capitalist think-tank for promoting the Austrian School of economics.

In an interview on The Tom Woods Show (a libertarian podcast), Jacobs mentioned Woods, Harry Browne, Ron Paul, John Stossel, Peter Schiff, and Murray Rothbard as his political influences and stated he is "theoretically a Rothbardian", but does not believe that a stateless society would be achieved in his lifetime. Some Tea Party affiliated groups attempted to recruit Jacobs to run in the 2014 Republican U.S. Senate primary in Tennessee against Senator Lamar Alexander.

In an interview conducted with the Washington Examiner in May 2024, Jacobs mentioned he had initial thoughts about a potential run for Governor of Tennessee once his term as Knox County Mayor concluded. In October 2024, Jacobs and Mark Calaway endorsed Trump in the 2024 U.S. presidential election, appearing in a TikTok with him which featured them calling out fellow wrestler Dave Bautista, who had been outspoken against Trump. Trump later went on to win the election. In August 2025, Jacobs confirmed he would not be running for Governor and chose to support Marsha Blackburn in the election. Blackburn later appointed Jacobs to be the treasurer for her gubernatorial campaign; since then, he has been seen as a potential appointee to fill her seat in the United States Senate.

=== Mayor of Knox County (2018–2026) ===
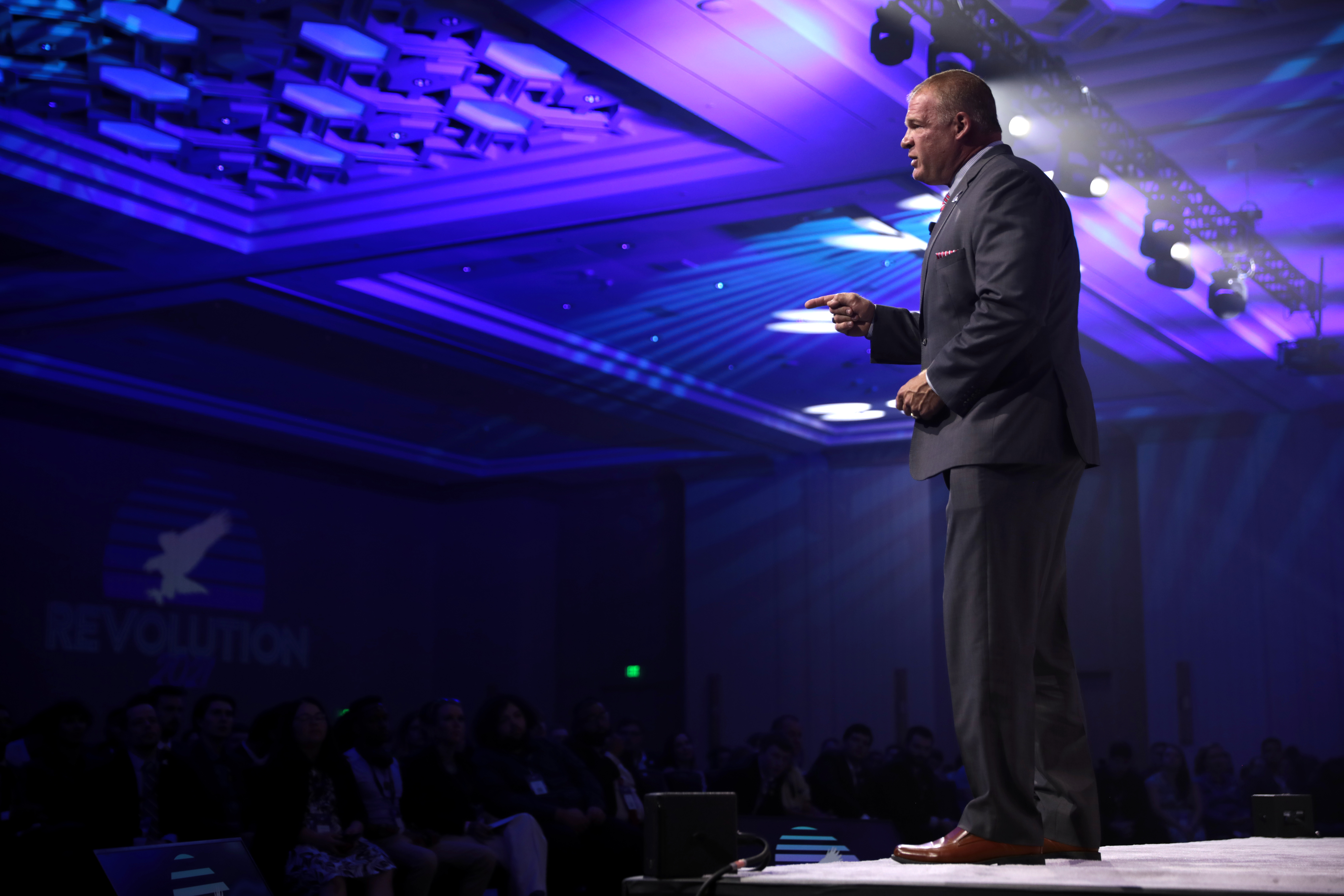
Jacobs as Mayor speaking with attendees at Revolution 2021 in Kissimmee, Florida.

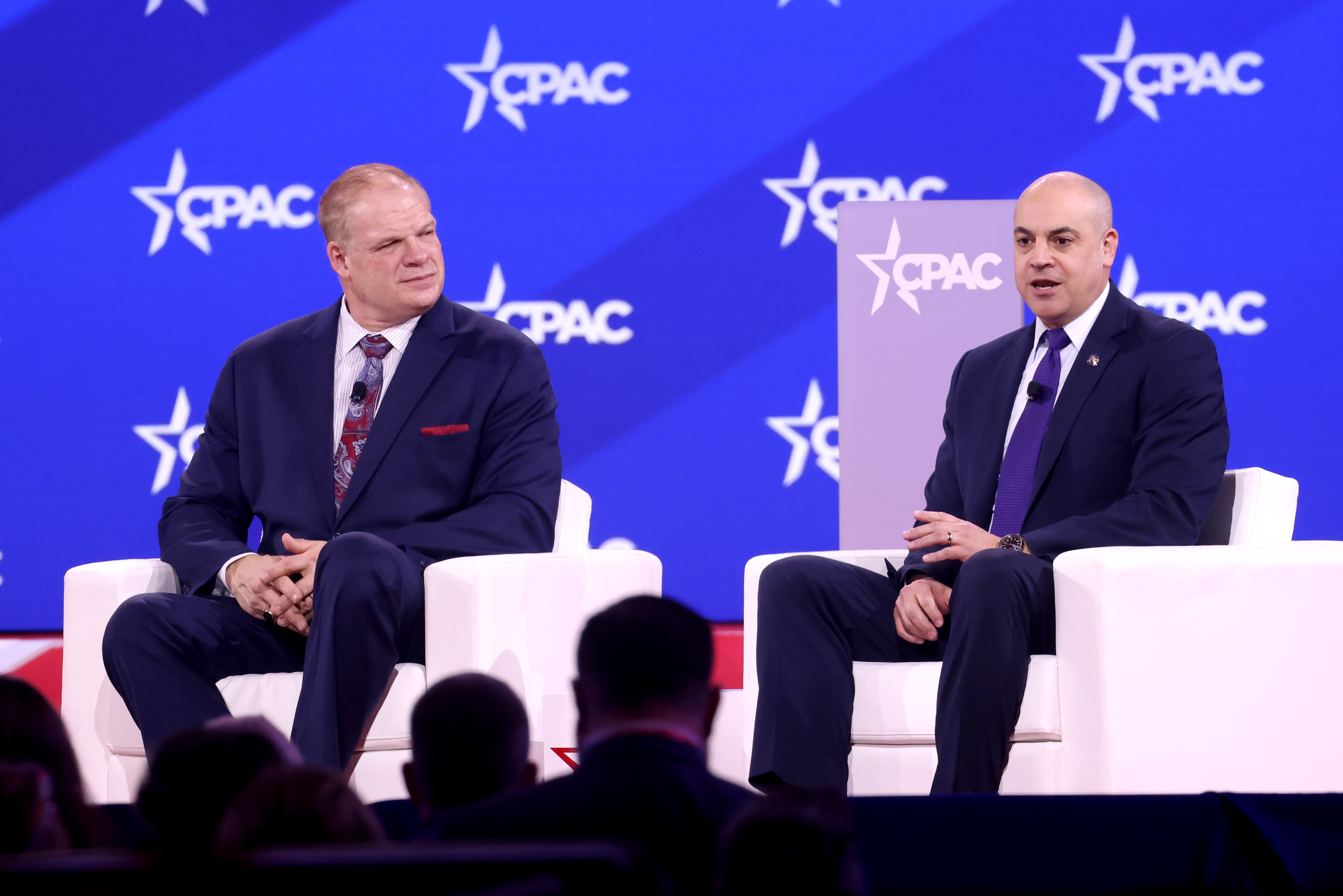
Jacobs and Pennsylvania Attorney General Dave Sunday speaking at the 2025 Conservative Political Action Conference (CPAC) in National Harbor, Maryland

In May 2016, Jacobs said he was "seriously considering" a run for the office of mayor of Knox County, Tennessee in 2018. In March 2017, he officially launched his campaign as a Republican. On May 1, 2018, he won the Republican primary election by 23 votes. On August 2, 2018, he was elected mayor, defeating Democratic opponent Linda Haney by a vote of 51,804 (66.39%) to 26,224 (33.61%). In a 2019 interview with Fox News promoting a recently released book of his, Jacobs was critical of the impeachment inquiry into President Donald Trump, saying the Democratic Party was creating further division by pursuing it.

In July 2020, Jacobs was the only member of the Knox County Board of Health to vote against a mask mandate for those inside certain buildings. He defended his vote by saying: "I worry that one-size-fits-all mandates such as this set a terrible precedent for government overreach, are difficult to enforce, can cause conflict between the authorities and the public when enforced, and, as written, this order places enforcement responsibilities on private businesses." He would get into a dispute with the Board in September 2020, after he recorded a video where images of fellow members were displayed over narration of Jacobs calling them "unelected bureaucrats who cast down edicts which carry the force of law with no accountability and no recourse". He would advocate for the abolishment of the Board and later successfully pressured the Knox County Commission to move up a vote on limiting their powers from March to April 2021.

On August 5, 2022, Jacobs won a second term by defeating Democratic candidate Debbie Helsley in the 2022 Knox County mayoral election. Due to term limit requirements, Jacobs could not run for a third term in the 2026 Knox County mayoral election and his second term concluded on September 1, 2026.

=== Electoral history ===
Precinct results Jacobs: 30–40% 40–50% 50–60% 60–70% Anders: 30–40% 40–50% 50–60% >90% Thomas: 30–40% 40–50% Tied: <50%

Knox County, Tennessee mayoral election Republican primary (2018)
Party	Candidate	Votes	%
Republican	Glenn Jacobs	14,640	36.10%
Republican	Brad Anders	14,617	36.04%
Republican	Bob Thomas	11,301	27.86%
Total votes		40,558	100.00%

2018 Knox County mayoral election
Party	Candidate	Votes	%
Republican	Glenn Jacobs	51,814	66.38%
Democratic	Linda Haney	26,241	33.62%
Total votes		78,057	100.00%
Turnout		78,057	26.31%

Knox County, Tennessee mayoral election Republican primary (2022)
Party	Candidate	Votes	%
Republican	Glenn Jacobs (incumbent)	24,687	100.00%
Total votes		24,687	100.00%

2022 Knox County mayoral election
Party	Candidate	Votes	%
Republican	Glenn Jacobs	30,306	55.28%
Democratic	Debbie Helsley	24,520	44.72%
Write-in	Tracy A. Clough (write-in)	1	0.00%
Total votes		54,287	100.00%

=== Treasurer of Marsha Blackburn's 2026 gubernatorial campaign ===
In August 2025, Jacobs was named treasurer of U.S. Senator Marsha Blackburn's 2026 campaign of Governor.

== Personal life ==
Jacobs has been married to Crystal Maurisa Goins since August 23, 1995. They have two daughters, named Arista and Devan, as well as two grandchildren.

Outside of wrestling, Jacobs also works as an insurer and he and his wife own an Allstate agency in Knoxville, Tennessee. In a July 2015 interview for Realtor.com, the website of the National Association of Realtors, Jacobs indicated that the couple's obligations to their insurance business led them to place their Jefferson City home up for sale. The home, built in 2005, was an hour's drive from the agency and both Jacobs and his wife eventually grew tired of the commute.

== Other media ==
Jacobs made his film debut as "Jacob Goodnight" in the first production of WWE Studios, See No Evil, which was released on May 19, 2006. Jacobs has also made an appearance in the film, MacGruber, alongside fellow WWE wrestlers Montel Vontavious Porter, Chris Jericho, The Great Khali, Mark Henry, and Big Show. See No Evil 2, also starring Jacobs, was announced in August 2013 and was released on October 21, 2014.

Kane appeared on a special WWE episode of The Weakest Link in March 2002, and won by beating out Bubba Ray Dudley in the final round. The money won was donated to Jacobs's chosen charity, St. Jude Children's Research Hospital, in Memphis, Tennessee. He also appeared on Smallville series episode "Combat" as Titan alongside former WWE Diva Ashley Massaro. The episode was aired on March 22, 2007. Kane was also featured in a Chef Boyardee commercial in which he attempts to eat while wearing his full face mask.

The Kane character was featured in the fourteen-issue Undertaker comic book produced by Chaos! Comics in 1999. The character only spoke once, in the Undertaker Halloween Special, which tied into the single issue Mankind comic book produced by the same company. A book written by Michael Chiappetta detailing the origins of Kane titled Journey into Darkness: An Unauthorized History of Kane was released in 2005. WWE released a three-disc anthology titled, The Twisted, Disturbed Life of Kane on December 9, 2008. The DVD consists of Kane's greatest feuds and rivalries during his first ten years.

Jacobs hosted a podcast titled The Tiny Political Show under the pseudonym Citizen X from March 16, 2007, to March 13, 2008. Jacobs also ran a blog called The Adventures of Citizen X at AdventuresOfCitizenX.com from 2007 until July 17, 2011, though its last update was made on May 28 earlier that same year. The website since relaunched, with its first update appearing on July 1, 2012. Jacobs is a contributor to LewRockwell.com.

Kane has appeared in nearly every licensed WWE/F video game since 1998's WWF War Zone, with the only exception being 2001's WWF Betrayal. From the 1990s to the end of the 2010s, Kane had 222 action figures manufactured, mainly from the WWE lines by Jakks Pacific and Mattel, according to the Wrestling Figure Checklist.

On April 12, 2026, Jacobs served as the grand marshal for the 2026 Food City 500.

== Filmography ==
Film
Year	Title	Role
2006	See No Evil	Jacob Goodnight
2010	MacGruber	Tanker Lutz
2014	Scooby-Doo! WrestleMania Mystery	Himself
2014	See No Evil 2	Jacob Goodnight
2016	Countdown	Lt. Cronin

Television
Year	Title	Role	Notes
2007	Smallville	Titan	Episode: "Combat"

Web series
Year	Title	Role	Notes
2013–2015	The JBL and Renee Show	Himself	Recurring role

== Video games ==
WWE video games
Year	Title	Notes
1998	WWF War Zone	Video game debut
1999	WWF Attitude	
1999	WWF WrestleMania 2000	
2000	WWF SmackDown!	
2000	WWF Royal Rumble	
2000	WWF No Mercy	
2000	WWF SmackDown! 2: Know Your Role	
2001	WWF With Authority!	Cover athlete
2001	WWF Road to WrestleMania	Cover athlete
2001	WWF SmackDown! Just Bring It	
2002	WWF Raw	Cover athlete
2002	WWE WrestleMania X8	
2002	WWE Road to WrestleMania X8	
2002	WWE SmackDown! Shut Your Mouth	
2003	WWE Crush Hour	
2003	WWE WrestleMania XIX	
2003	WWE Raw 2	
2003	WWE SmackDown! Here Comes the Pain	
2004	WWE Day of Reckoning	
2004	WWE Survivor Series	
2004	WWE SmackDown! vs. Raw	
2005	WWE WrestleMania 21	
2005	WWE Day of Reckoning 2	
2005	WWE SmackDown! vs. Raw 2006	
2006	WWE SmackDown vs. Raw 2007	
2007	WWE SmackDown vs. Raw 2008	
2008	WWE SmackDown vs. Raw 2009	
2009	WWE SmackDown vs. Raw 2010	
2010	WWE SmackDown vs. Raw 2011	
2011	WWE All Stars	
2011	WWE '12	
2012	WWE WrestleFest	
2012	WWE '13	
2013	WWE 2K14	
2014	WWE SuperCard	
2014	WWE 2K15	
2015	WWE Immortals	
2015	WWE 2K16	
2016	WWE 2K17	
2017	WWE Champions	
2017	WWE Tap Mania	
2017	WWE 2K18	
2017	WWE Mayhem	
2018	WWE 2K19	
2019	WWE 2K20	
2020	WWE 2K Battlegrounds	
2022	WWE 2K22	
2023	WWE 2K23	
2024	WWE 2K24	
2025	WWE 2K25	
2026	WWE 2K26	

== Championships and accomplishments ==
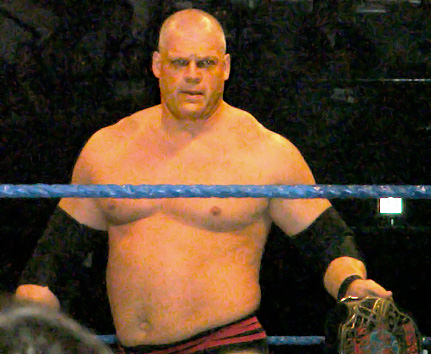
In WWE, Kane is a former ECW Champion...

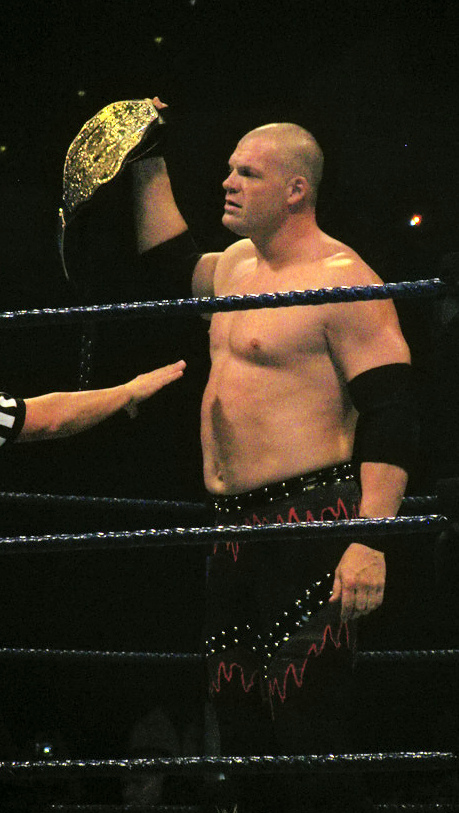
...and a former World Heavyweight Champion

- CBS Sports
  - Worst Angle of the Year (2018) with The Undertaker vs. Triple H and Shawn Michaels
- Pro Wrestling Illustrated
  - PWI Feud of the Year (2013) vs. Daniel Bryan as a member of The Authority
  - PWI Most Hated Wrestler of the Year (2013) as a member of The Authority
  - PWI Tag Team of the Year (1999) with X-Pac
  - Ranked no. 4 of the top 500 singles wrestlers of the year in the PWI 500 in 2011
  - Ranked no. 186 of the 500 best singles wrestlers during the PWI Years in 2003
- Smoky Mountain Wrestling
  - SMW Tag Team Championship (1 time) – with Al Snow
- United States Wrestling Association
  - USWA Heavyweight Championship (1 time)
- World Wrestling Federation / World Wrestling Entertainment / WWE
  - WWF Championship (1 time)
  - World Heavyweight Championship (1 time)
  - ECW Championship (1 time)
  - WWF/WWE Intercontinental Championship (2 times)
  - WWF Hardcore Championship (1 time)
  - WWE 24/7 Championship (1 time)
  - WWE Tag Team Championship (2 times) – with Big Show (1 time) and Daniel Bryan (1 time)
  - WWF/WWE/World Tag Team Championship (9 times) – with Mankind (2 times), X-Pac (2 times), The Undertaker (2 times), The Hurricane (1 time), Rob Van Dam (1 time), and Big Show (1 time)
  - WCW World Tag Team Championship (1 time) – with The Undertaker
  - Tag Team Royal Rumble (1998)
  - WWF Triple Crown Champion (eighth)
  - WWE Grand Slam Champion (third)
  - WWE Hall of Fame (Class of 2021)
  - Bragging Rights Trophy (2009) – with Team SmackDown (Chris Jericho, Matt Hardy, R-Truth, Finlay, David Hart Smith, and Tyson Kidd)
  - Money in the Bank (SmackDown 2010)
  - Slammy Award (2 times)
    - Best Family Values (2010) Beating up Jack Swagger Sr.
    - Match of the Year (2014) Team Cena vs. Team Authority at Survivor Series
- WrestleCrap
  - Gooker Award (2002) – Katie Vick feud with Triple H
- Wrestling Observer Newsletter
  - Most Disgusting Promotional Tactic (1996) – fake Diesel gimmick
  - Most Disgusting Promotional Tactic (2002) – being accused of murder and necrophilia by Triple H
  - Most Disgusting Promotional Tactic (2004) – pregnancy/wedding/miscarriage angle with Lita
  - Most Overrated (2010, 2014, 2015)
  - Worst Feud of the Year (2002) vs. Triple H
  - Worst Feud of the Year (2003) vs. Shane McMahon
  - Worst Feud of the Year (2004) vs. Matt Hardy and Lita
  - Worst Feud of the Year (2007) vs. Big Daddy V
  - Worst Feud of the Year (2008) vs. Rey Mysterio
  - Worst Feud of the Year (2010) vs. Edge
  - Worst Feud of the Year (2012) vs. John Cena
  - Worst Feud of the Year (2013) – The Authority vs. Big Show
  - Worst Gimmick (1996) as "fake Diesel"
  - Worst Worked Match of the Year (2001) with The Undertaker vs. KroniK at Unforgiven
  - Worst Worked Match of the Year (2018) with The Undertaker vs. Triple H and Shawn Michaels at Crown Jewel

== Luchas de Apuestas record ==
Winner (wager)	Loser (wager)	Location	Event	Date	Notes
Jerry Lawler (championship)	Christmas Creature (mask)	Memphis, Tennessee	USWA live event	December 28, 1992	
Kane (mask)	Vader (mask)	Milwaukee, Wisconsin	Over the Edge	May 31, 1998	
Triple H (championship)	Kane (mask)	New York City, New York	Raw	June 23, 2003	

Political offices
Preceded by Tim Burchett	Mayor of Knox County; 2018–2026	Succeeded by Betsy Henderson
