= 2018 Knox County, Tennessee mayoral election =

2018 Knox County mayoral election
- August 2, 2018
- Turnout: 26.31% ▲5.45 pp
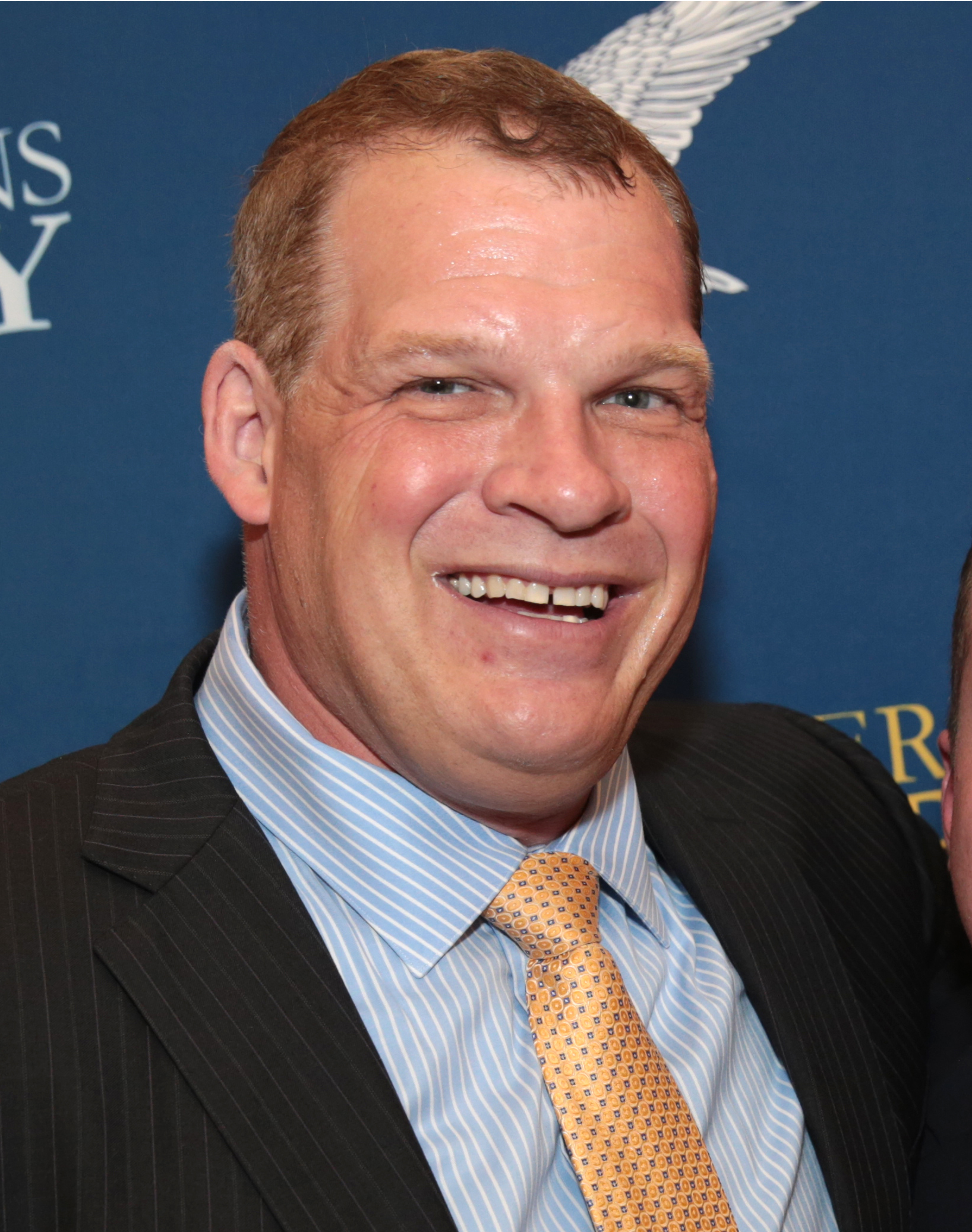

Candidate	Glenn Jacobs	Linda Haney
Party	Republican	Democratic
Popular vote	51,814	26,241
Percentage	66.38%	33.62%
- Jacobs: 50–60% 60–70% 70–80% 80–90% Haney: 50–60% 60–70% 70–80% Tied
Mayor before election
Tim Burchett
Republican
Elected Mayor
Glenn Jacobs
Republican

The 2018 Knox County mayoral election was held on August 2, 2018, to determine the mayor of Knox County, Tennessee. Republican businessman and professional wrestler Glenn Jacobs (better known by his ring name, Kane) won the election with 66.4% of the vote against Democrat Linda Haney.

Incumbent mayor Tim Burchett, first elected in 2010, was term-limited and could not run for a third consecutive term. Instead, he successfully ran for the U.S. House of Representatives in Tennessee's 2nd congressional district to succeed the retiring 30-year incumbent representative, Jimmy Duncan.

== Republican primary ==
=== Candidates ===
Nominee

- Glenn Jacobs, businessman, actor, and professional wrestler, known as "Kane"

Eliminated in primary

- Bob Thomas, county commissioner and former radio show host and television writer
- Brad Anders, county commissioner and lieutenant of the Knoxville Police Department

=== Primary results ===
The Republican primary was held on May 1, 2018.

Unlike elections held within the city of Knoxville, county elections use the plurality voting system, with no chance of a runoff. This was a very close primary with Jacobs securing the nomination by just 23 votes.

Precinct results Jacobs: 30–40% 40–50% 50–60% 60–70% Anders: 30–40% 40–50% 50–60% >90% Thomas: 30–40% 40–50% Tied: <50%

Republican primary results
Party	Candidate	Votes	%
Republican	Glenn Jacobs	14,640	36.10%
Republican	Brad Anders	14,617	36.04%
Republican	Bob Thomas	11,301	27.86%
Total votes		40,558	100.00%

== Democratic primary ==
=== Candidates ===
Nominee

- Linda Haney

Eliminated in primary

- Rhonda Gallman
- Rebecca Deloa

=== Primary results ===
The Democratic primary was held on May 1, 2018.

Democratic primary results
Party	Candidate	Votes	%
Democratic	Linda Haney	4,284	55.89%
Democratic	Rhonda Gallman	1,926	25.13%
Democratic	Rebecca Deloa	1,455	18.98%
Total votes		7,665	100.00%

== General election ==
General election results
Party	Candidate	Votes	%
Republican	Glenn Jacobs	51,814	66.38%
Democratic	Linda Haney	26,241	33.62%
Write-in	Tracy A. Clough (write-in)	2	0.00%
Total votes		78,057	100.00%

== See also ==
- 2018 Tennessee elections
- 2018 Shelby County, Tennessee, mayoral election
- 2018 Hamilton County, Tennessee, mayoral election
