= David Stanley =

David Stanley may refer to:

- David S. Stanley (1828–1902), Union Army general during the American Civil War
- David M. Stanley (1928–2015), American politician in Iowa
- David Stanley, Elvis Presley's step-brother and bodyguard, see Protecting the King
