= Happy Monster Band =

Children's television series

- Title card from the first season
- Created by: Don Carter
- Directed by: Chris Prynoski (season 1); Steve Loter (season 2)
- Music by: Tally Hall
- Countries of origin: United States; United Kingdom
- Original language: English
- No. of seasons: 2
- No. of episodes: 20

Production
- Executive producers: Loris Kramer Lunsford; Jason Netter
- Running time: 5 minutes
- Production companies: Kickstart Productions; Titmouse, Inc.

Original release
- Network: Playhouse Disney
- Release: October 1, 2007 – October 28, 2008

Happy Monster Band (branded as Happy Monster Band: World Tour in season 2) is an animated children's television series that originally aired on Playhouse Disney from October 1, 2007, to October 28, 2008. The series was created by Don Carter and produced by Kickstart Productions. It is about a group of monsters who perform songs about friendship, love, exercise, chores, and other preschool themes.

== Characters ==
=== Main ===
There are four monsters that make up the Happy Monster Band: Frred, L.O., Bluz, and Ink. Each of the monster's name reflects its color: Frred's signature color is red, L.O.'s is yellow, Bluz's is blue, and Ink's is pink. They were designed by Don Carter. All four of the band members are children, but their singing voices are those of some of the members of the band Tally Hall. In the UK version, children's voices are used for the singing portions.

- Frred (voiced by Rob Cantor (singing voice) and Kurt Doss (speaking voice)) is red and is one of the band's lead singers and plays a purple electric guitar. While Ink may appear to be the leader, many fans tend to regard Frred as the actual leader.
- L.O. (voiced by Zubin Sedghi (singing voice) and Trevor Gagnon (speaking voice), Nathan Simpson in the UK version) is the other lead singer. L.O. is yellow and plays a green bass guitar with four strings. He is the only monster in the band that goes against traditional thinking, preferring to paint and write poetry instead of scaring. He is considered to be a shy introvert. He is the oldest member in the band.
- Bluz (voiced by Joe Hawley (singing voice), Jonah Lees (Direct from Monsterland), and Jake T. Austin (World Tour) (speaking voices)) is the band's keyboardist, is blue and has four legs. His keyboard is magenta and has twelve black keys. Bluz often contradicts L.O.'s opinions, stating that monsters should scare and not care about art. During the World Tour, Bluz knows a little bit about foreign languages, which makes him appear unintelligent. However, he shows kindness and empathy for others. He can also be very friendly. He is the youngest member of the band.
- Ink (voiced by Tara Sands (singing voice), Hannah Leigh (Direct from Monsterland), and Chantal Strand (World Tour) (speaking voices)) is the band's drummer. She has three eyes and is pink. Her drums can glow either pink, magenta or purple. Unlike the other band members, Ink only sings during choruses. However she has a solo verse in "Do the Monster Stomp". During the World Tour, she carries a globe that shows where the band is and is fluent in several languages.

=== Recurring ===
The first season introduces several characters.

- Roc and Raoul (voiced by Yuri Lowenthal and Sam Riegel, respectively) are two-headed purple monster brothers and are the show's hosts. They speak in rhyme, except while backstage, and are also present in season two (World Tour).
- La, Dee, and Da are the show's judges and are only in the first season. They are all bright green and are based on Randy Jackson, Paula Abdul, and Simon Cowell.

=== World Tour ===
- The Rancher is an introducer in Texas.
- The Beret Monster is a monster with a beret which Bluz talks to in France.
- The Gondolier is a monster who rows a gondola in Italy.
- Dwight is a giant monster in Italy who is often hungry and is used as a comedic explanation for the Tower of Pisa's leaning and for the Colosseum missing a large part of its wall.
- Joey is a kangaroo in Australia.
- Ravi is an energetic four-year-old boy in India. He has the biggest star in Bollywood, Pooja.
- Akito is the band's pen pal in Japan. He has a robot named Robo-Dude.
- Johnny and Franklin were introduced in the World Tour episode "The Monster Tangle" in Argentina.
- The Queen is a three-eyed monster who lives in Buckingham Palace.

== Episodes ==
=== Series 1 (Direct from Monsterland, 2007) ===
1. "I Will Be Your Friend" – The monsters celebrate their long friendship together.
2. "I'm the Best at Being Me" – L.O. is not as scary as Bluz because he likes to write poetry and paint.
3. "Do the Monster Stomp" – Frred thinks that Bluz found what was missing.
4. "Do Re Mi–Mi–Mi" – Ink struggles to write a song for work until her friends help her.
5. "Monster Hoe Down" – The monsters have dressed up as three cowboys and a cowgirl and are ready to hoedown.
6. "Even Monsters Cry Sometimes" – Frred is sad because his father has a flat tire and he worries he will miss the concert, making him cry until his friends comfort him, saying it's okay for anyone, even monsters, to cry.
7. "Dirty, Smelly Monster Chores" – L.O. does chores, spreading clothes on the floor, bringing in garbage and tracking mud around.
8. "Get Up and Go Go Go" – The monsters tell Roc and Raoul all about their morning routines - from brushing their fangs to messing up their fur.
9. "Scare Up Some Fun" – The twins see an empty room and think that the band is nowhere to be seen. The band tries to scare them.
10. "Practice Makes Progress" – Ink's jump rope contest is coming up, so she practices her skills.

=== Series 2 (World Tour, 2008) ===
1. "At the Rodeo" - The band is in Texas and is at the ranch. Frred is on a horse and twirls a lasso. Frred is a rock-and-roll rodeo cowboy.
2. "A Wonderful Time in France" - While The band is in France, Bluz wanted to ask The Beret Monster where did he got his beret from.
3. "The Italian Way" - The band is in Italy and Frred is very hungry but L.O. accidentally drops his camera.
4. "Yin and Yang" - The band is in Hong Kong.
5. "Here in Australia" - The band rocks at the Sydney Opera House in Australia.
6. "In India" - The band makes a Bollywood movie at the Taj Mahal and rocks with a tiger, a snake charmer and Pooja the elephant in India.
7. "Siesta! Siesta!" - The band plays soccer in Spain.
8. "Konichiwa!" - The band rocks in Japan.
9. "The Monster Tangle" - The band does the Monster Tangle instead of a tango in Argentina.
10. "London Town" - The band finds a double decker bus in England because their bus has a flat tire.

== Production ==
The music was written and performed by Rob Cantor, Joe Hawley, and Zubin Sedghi from indie rock band Tally Hall. The characters and concept for the show were created by children's book author and illustrator, Don Carter. Judy Rothman Rofé wrote all the episodes in Season One and five of the episodes in Season Two.

The shorts have been edited to replace the mention of the playhousedisney.com website with the one for a corresponding country, most notably playhousedisney.co.uk for the UK dub and playhousedisney.de for the German dub, and disneyjunior.com after Playhouse Disney rebranded as Disney Junior.

== Broadcast ==
In the United Kingdom, the show was shown on Playhouse Disney/Disney Junior from October 5, 2007, to 2014.
