= Kurt Doss =

American actor

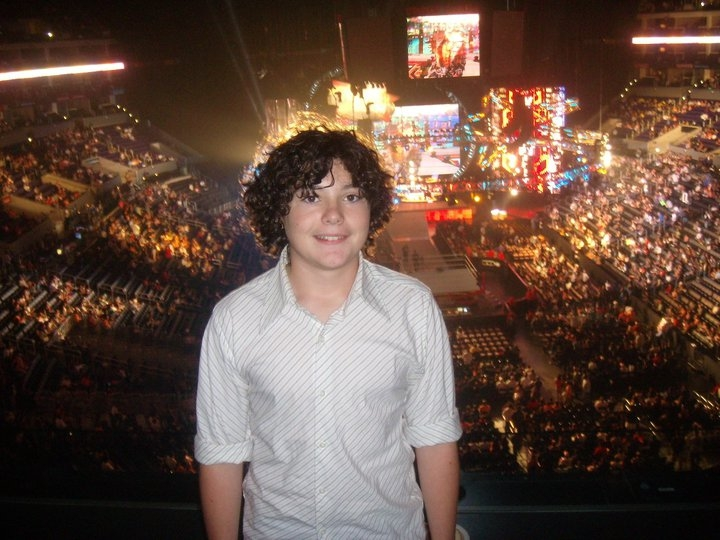
- Kurt Doss in 2010
- Born: September 18, 1996 (age 30); Erie, Pennsylvania
- Occupation: actor

Kurt Doss (born September 18, 1996) is an American actor, best known for playing Frred in Happy Monster Band, and playing the youngest son, Ben Gallagher in Ruby & the Rockits.

== Biography ==
Doss's home town is Erie, Pennsylvania. From a young age had a sense of humor, which got the attention of Chambers Stevens, who is an acting coach. Doss was introduced to acting by Stevens, and Doss and his mother decided to move to Los Angeles, CA so Doss could pursue acting.

== Career ==
In a six-year period, Doss appeared in 40 national commercials for Kellogg's, Sarah Lee, Washington Mutual, Fruit of the Loom, and others.

He made his acting debut in television, playing Tori Spelling's nephew in the TV movie, A Christmas Carol. Soon-after, Kurt had co-starring and guest starring roles in television such as According to Jim, Joey, Desperate Housewives, Back To You The New Adventures of Old Christine, Scrubs and more. He was a lead series regular in the children's program Happy Monster Band, plus he had a recurring role in Special Agent Oso. Doss also has appeared in sketch comedy and improv, such as The Tonight Show with Jay Leno, MAD TV and Frank TV. He then landed a starring role in Ruby & the Rockits, playing the youngest son, Ben. His first leading role in a feature film was Henry in Knucklehead.

== Filmography ==
Film
Year	Film	Role	Other notes
2003	The Bug Man	Kevin	
2003	A Carol Christmas	Tyler	
2004	The Five People You Meet in Heaven	Young Boy	Voice only
2007	The Minister of Divine	Boy	TV film
2007	Seven's Eleven: Sweet Toys	Breaker	
2008	Libertyville	Grant	TV film
2008	The Hottie and the Nottie	Young Arno Blount	
2008	Role Models	Kyle	
2009	Opposite Day	Kid Shop Owner	
2010	Knucklehead	Henry	
Television
Year	Series	Role	Other notes
2004	According to Jim	Kid #1	"Dress to Kill Me" (Season 4, Episode 5)
2004	Huff	Young Teddy	"That Fucking Cabin" (Season 1, Episode 7)
2004	The Tonight Show with Jay Leno	Various characters	Unknown episodes
2005	Life on a Stick	Gus	"Pilot" (Season 1, Episode 1)
2005	Joey	Kid #2	"Joey and the Poker" (Season 2, Episode 7)
2006	Dr. Phil	Kurt/Boy	"Are You a Bitch?"
2006	Mike's Super Short Show	Cousin Stevie	"Chicken Little" (Season 4, Episode 16)
2006	The New Adventures of Old Christine	Jack	"Teach Your Children Well" (Season 1, Episode 8)
2006	Invasion	Curtis	"The Son Also Rises" (Season 1, Episode 19)
2007	Punk'd	Kurt	Episode #8.2
2007	3-Minute Game Show	Himself - Contestant	"High School Musical 2: Part 2" (Season 1, Episode 2)
2007	Desperate Housewives	Boy #2	"Gossip" (Season 3, Episode 20)
2007	Back to You	Brian	"Gracie's Bully" (Season 1, Episode 6)
2007	Frank TV	German Boy	"Frankly, My Dear, I Don't Give a Frank" (Season 1, Episode 3)
2008	Happy Monster Band	Frred	Voice role 10 episodes
2008	Special Agent Oso	Dawson	Unknown episodes
2009	Scrubs	Ryan	"Our Role Models" (Season 9, Episode 3)
2009	Ruby & the Rockits	Ben Gallagher	Main role, 10 episodes
