= Knucklehead (2010 film) =

- Promotional poster
- Directed by: Michael Watkins
- Written by: Bear Aderhold; Thomas F. X. Sullivan; Adam Rifkin
- Produced by: Michael Pavone
- Starring: Big Show; Mark Feuerstein; Dennis Farina
- Cinematography: Kenneth Zunder and Ollie Turner
- Edited by: Peck Prior and Jai Paddam
- Music by: James A. Johnston
- Production company: WWE Studios
- Distributed by: Samuel Goldwyn Films
- Release date: October 22, 2010
- Running time: 91 minutes
- Country: United States
- Language: English
- Box office: $7,927 (RSA)

Knucklehead is a 2010 American comedy film starring Big Show (Paul Wight), Melora Hardin, Mark Feuerstein, and Dennis Farina. It was released on October 22, 2010, in select theaters and garnered strongly negative reviews from critics, who found fault in the film's premise, execution, and clichéd tropes. The DVD was released on November 9, 2010. Farina later called it the most embarrassing project of his career.

== Plot ==
Walter Krunk is a 35-year-old orphan who has lived in an orphanage since childhood. He has a friendship with a fellow orphan named Henry. During a play at the orphanage, Walter ruins the set by crashing into the set when his harness malfunctions. Meanwhile, retired MMA fighter Eddie Sullivan is training a fellow fighter for a tournament in New Orleans with a $100,000 prize. Fellow rival Memphis Earl has also trained a bigger, scarier fighter named Redrum for the tournament. Both of their trainees have a short match, but Eddie's fighter is easily knocked out with one punch. Earl threatens Eddie saying that if he doesn't find a new fighter they'll beat him down.

One day Walter is cooking with Henry when Walter suddenly goes to the bathroom and tells Henry to watch the food. Henry is distracted by a game and doesn't see that the food has started a fire. The fire department manages to put the fire out but it leaves the kitchen destroyed. Local law enforcement states that without a working kitchen the orphanage must close down - unless they can get enough money to fix the kitchen in 10 days. Eddie enters a church and asks God to let him find a good fighter in time for the tournament. Meanwhile, the owner of the orphanage is scolding Walter for causing the fire, which causes him to fall into the church from above, seemingly answering Eddie's prayer. Eddie decides to train Walter to be his fighter.

Walter is not much of a fighter, but the orphanage owner agrees. However, Mary Alice must go with them. They set off in the orphanage bus to matches around the region. The first match is in a Jefferson City church. Eddie decides to tape and upload the match highlights for internet fan buzz, but during the match Walter doesn't show much of a fight and is easily dominated but manages to win. Meanwhile, Memphis Earl and Redrum go to the gym to see Eddie, and instead find Eddie's father. His father tells them that Eddie isn't there and he recruited a new fighter. That night at a motel Mary and Walter have a talk about their current predicament. Mary doesn't want Walter to fight, but Walter changes her mind by saying that he's on the road for the first time in his life and that he's doing something important.

Meanwhile, Earl and Redrum have found the group at the motel and threaten Eddie to stay away from New Orleans. The next day, driving to the next match, the bus engine starts smoking. This causes the bus to crash into a pole and eventually explode. Eddie, Mary, and Walter escape unharmed. Walking on the road with only $200, Mary manages to get a truck driver to take them to the next match. The next fight is at a kid's house, where he hosts fights in his backyard and pays the fighters with the attendance money from other kids. While Eddie gives Walter a pep talk to get him riled up, the kid's dad notices the fights and goes on a rampage, telling everyone to get out of his yard. Walter runs into the backyard and tackles the dad into the fence, thinking he was his opponent.

Eddie calls his dad who got injured because of Earl and Redrum and tells him to enter the tournament and win to avenge him. Mary takes them to a trailer park where her friend Tina lives. They tell her of the situation and remember that at a nearby carnival there was a sign that offered anyone to fight a grizzly bear with a $500 prize. Tina gives Walter a new look (shaving his head and giving tattoos), and Walter falls in love with Tina. Walter manages to win with a choke hold and is given the nickname "The Bear Basher". Later that night, while riding a bus, Walter has a serious gas attack that leads to the group being kicked off the bus. Meanwhile, Memphis Earl discovers that Walter is a serious threat and might win the tournament, so he decides to adopt Henry and hold him hostage. The orphanage owner refuses to let him adopt Henry even after he promises a good life for him. The group walks to a gas station and Eddie goes in to ask for directions to a rental car company. A motorcycle gang shows up and starts messing with Mary. Eddie attempts to help but is outnumbered by them. Walter comes and fights them off, while Eddie goes in to get the security footage and continue their journey on one of the gang members' motorcycles.

Throughout the journey, Walter wins more fights, earning more money while Eddie teaches Mary and Walter more fighting moves. During their nightly camp outs, Eddie and Mary start having feelings for each other. Finally arriving in New Orleans, Eddie checks the group in to a luxury hotel, plans a pre-fight celebration for a night on the town and buys Mary a dress and Walter a tuxedo. At the restaurant, Eddie tells Walter to not stare but Eddie does when Mary walks in. Some girls invite Walter to dance, but Mary stays at their table. Mary gets drunk from drinking Eddie's drink and confronts the waitress when she sees her talking to Eddie. This results in a fight, ending with Mary knocking out the waitress with a spinning heel kick. The following day, while Walter is preparing for the tournament at the hotel, Tina shows up to give Walter a pair of shorts she made for him. During the sign-in, Mary calls the orphanage owner saying that the trip is almost over. However, after the call ends a fellow worker informs the owner that they can't find Henry. The man who is in charge of the sign in says that Eddie didn't pre register so Walter can't compete. Mary tells everyone who Walter is so they get into the tournament.

Both Walter and Redrum make it to the finals. Backstage, Eddie's dad shows up not wanting to miss the main event. Eddie, not sure if Walter will win, asks his dad to make sure that the money they made on the road makes to the orphanage. Memphis Earl reveals to Mary in the women's restroom why Eddie retired: it was because he was banned from fighting for life after taking a dive in a title fight. When she confronts Eddie, before he can explain the situation the orphanage workers reveal that Memphis Earl has kidnapped Henry and is holding him hostage, unless Walter takes a dive in the fight. Eddie plans to have the match stalled while the workers look for Henry, knowing that Earl won't leave with Redrum in the ring. During the fight, Earl shows up with Henry to distract Walter, but this makes him angry enough to win the fight by submission and Memphis Earl is arrested for kidnapping.

During the celebration Eddie's dad reveals that he bet the $4,000 on Walter to win and got $80,000 for the orphanage. Eddie and Mary kiss to end the scene. Walter is then filling a moving truck for his new apartment. He notices Henry looking upset and Henry tells him it's because Walter moving and he's not and that he is losing his best friend. Walter tells Henry that he's going to adopt Henry and wouldn't leave him behind.

== Cast ==
- Big Show as Walter Krunk
- Mark Feuerstein as Eddie Sullivan
- Melora Hardin as Mary
- Kurt Doss as Henry
- Dennis Farina as Earl "Memphis Earl"
- Wendie Malick as Sister Francesca
- Rebecca Creskoff as Tina
- Will Patton as Victor "Vic" Sullivan
- Lester Speight as Redrum
- Saul Rubinek as Rabbi
- Bobb'e J. Thompson as Milton "Mad Milton"
- Lurie Poston as Todd
- Lance E. Nichols as Milton's Dad
- Jake Austin Walker as Dennis

== Production ==
This is WWE Studios' second produced film (the first being Legendary, starring fellow wrestler John Cena), with Samuel Goldwyn Films. Filming began in New Orleans, Louisiana, and finished in November 2009.

== Critical reception ==
The film has received generally negative reviews by critics. Slant Magazine gave the film half a star out of 5 stars, writing that the film's title is "a description for both the film and anyone who chooses to be its audience." Variety wrote that the acting "leaves a bit to be desired", and that "no one in the cast is that strong". Film Journal International called it a "lame comedy about a big doofus who enters the fight game manages to take every cliché in the book and render them even more clichéd." The New York Times called the film "mediocre".
