= Big Show =

American professional wrestler and actor (born 1972)

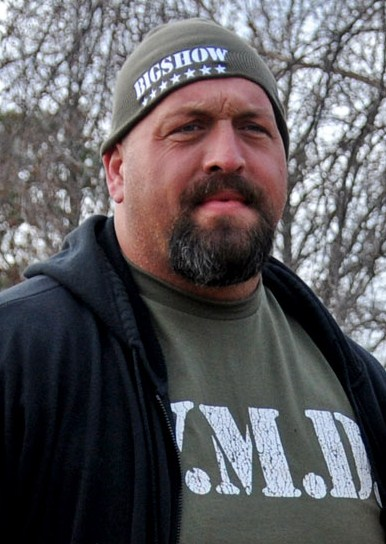
- Wight at Fort Bragg in December 2011.

Personal information
- Born: Paul Donald Wight II; February 8, 1972 (age 54) Aiken, South Carolina, U.S.
- Spouses: Melissa Piavis (m. 1997; div. 2002); Bess Katramados (m. 2002)
- Children: 1

Professional wrestling career
- Ring names: (The) Big Show; (The) Giant; Paul Wight
- Billed height: 7 ft 0 in (213 cm) – 7 ft 2 in (218 cm)
- Billed weight: 383 lb (174 kg) – 500 lb (230 kg)
- Billed from: Tampa, Florida
- Trained by: Larry Sharpe; Thrasher
- Debut: December 3, 1994

Paul Donald Wight II (born February 8, 1972) is an American professional wrestler and actor. He is signed to All Elite Wrestling (AEW), where he performs under his real name and is a color commentator for Collision. He is best known for his tenure with World Championship Wrestling (WCW) from 1995 to 1999 as (the) Giant and his tenure with the World Wrestling Federation/WWE from 1999 to 2021 under the ring name (the) Big Show.

Wight played college basketball at Wichita State University before transferring to other schools. He began his wrestling career in 1994. In 1995, he signed with WCW, where, due to his great height and large frame, he was known by the ring name The Giant and initially introduced as "the son of André the Giant". In early 1999, he left WCW to join the World Wrestling Federation (WWF).

Between WWF/WWE and WCW, he has held 23 total championships, including being a seven-time world champion, having held the WCW World Heavyweight Championship twice, the WWF/WWE Championship twice, WWE's World Heavyweight Championship twice and WWE's ECW Championship once, (making him the only wrestler who has won all four titles), and an 11-time world tag team champion, holding the WWF/World, WWE and WCW World Tag Team Championships multiple times with various partners. Having also won the Intercontinental, United States and Hardcore championships, he is the 24th Triple Crown and 12th Grand Slam winner in WWE history. He also won the 60-man battle royal at World War 3 and the 30-man André the Giant Memorial Battle Royal at WrestleMania 31. He has headlined multiple pay-per-view events for WCW and WWF/WWE since 1995, including the 16th edition of WWE's premier annual event, WrestleMania.

Outside of professional wrestling, Wight has appeared in feature films and television series such as Jingle All the Way, The Waterboy, Star Trek: Enterprise, and two USA Network's comedy-dramas Royal Pains, Psych and the action-drama Burn Notice. He had lead roles in the WWE Studios comedy film Knucklehead and the Netflix sitcom The Big Show Show.

== Early life ==
Wight was born February 8, 1972, in Aiken, South Carolina. He was born with acromegaly, a disease of the endocrine system that causes accelerated growth. By the age of twelve, he was 6 ft 2 in (1.88 m) tall, weighed 220 lb (100 kg), and had chest hair. In 1991, as a member of the Wichita State University basketball team at age 19, he was listed at 7 ft 1 in (2.16 m). He underwent successful surgery in the early 1990s on his pituitary gland, which halted the growth. His shoe size is 22 5E, his ring size is 22, and his chest is 64 inches (1,600 mm) in circumference. In 2005, he leased a bus and hired a bus driver because of the practical problems his size presents to air travel and car rental.

Wight played basketball and American football in high school at W. Wyman King Academy in Batesburg-Leesville, South Carolina. He was a standout center for the basketball team and a tight end for the football team. He quit football after his freshman year because of disputes with the coach. He continued to support the team by joining the cheerleading squad as a sophomore, partly from spite. He later called it "the greatest experience of my life... Everybody else was riding a bus with sweaty equipment, and I'm in a van with seven cheerleaders who are all learning about life". The van was driven by "a mom who was deaf in her right ear and chain-smoked".

After leaving high school, Wight attended Northern Oklahoma Junior College in Tonkawa, Oklahoma, where his basketball averages of 14 points and 6.5 rebounds earned him all-conference honors and helped the team win the Western Division of the Oklahoma Bi-State Conference. He went on to attend Wichita State University, where in 1991-1992 he played for the Wichita State Shockers. Wight subsequently attended Southern Illinois University Edwardsville from 1992 to 1993, where he was a member of the National Collegiate Athletic Association (NCAA) Division II Cougars basketball team and scored 39 points for the Cougars in limited action; he joined the Xi Beta chapter of Tau Kappa Epsilon fraternity at Southern Illinois University-Edwardsville. He left SIU without a degree.

After leaving college, Wight worked various jobs including bouncing, bounty hunting, and answering phone calls.

== Professional wrestling career ==
=== Training and early career (1994–1995) ===
Wight paid $5,000 to train at Larry Sharpe's Monster Factory, but due to Sharpe's gout at the time, he was only very minimally trained (Johnny Polo taught him the collar-and-elbow tie-up). Wight wrestled the first match of his career on December 3, 1994, at a World Wrestling Association (WWA) show in Clementon, New Jersey; he lost by count-out to WWA Heavyweight Champion Frank Finnegan.

Wight attempted to inquire about joining the World Wrestling Federation (WWF) during an autograph session at the Rosemont Horizon. Promoter and scout Bob Collins turned him away after he admitted he had no experience. While attending the Monster Factory, Wight made an audition tape and gave it to Mike Chioda, whom he had met in a Philadelphia bar. Chioda forwarded it to Pat Patterson, who did not bother watching it because he assumed Wight was another wrestler, Kurrgan. Only when he later saw The Giant debut in World Championship Wrestling (WCW) did Patterson realize his mistake, much to Vince McMahon's displeasure.

While answering phones for a karaoke company, Wight met Danny Bonaduce in a live microphone amateur contest on his morning radio show. Bonaduce introduced Wight to his friend, WCW wrestler Hulk Hogan. They had an informal basketball game, as part of a WCW promotion for an upcoming show at the Rosemont Horizon. Hogan liked how Wight worked the crowd and recommended him to WCW's vice president, Eric Bischoff. Wight went to the Horizon show, and was invited into the locker room, where he met Ric Flair, Arn Anderson (his boyhood hero) and Paul Orndorff. He later met Bischoff there and came to a deal.

=== World Championship Wrestling (1995–1999) ===
==== WCW World Heavyweight Champion (1995–1996) ====
In 1995, Wight signed with WCW. He debuted on May 21 at Slamboree '95: A Legends' Reunion, where he was billed as the son of André the Giant and accordingly used the ring name "the Giant" as a member of Kevin Sullivan's Dungeon of Doom stable. Wight made his WCW in-ring debut at the Halloween Havoc pay-per-view in October 1995, challenging Hulk Hogan for the WCW World Heavyweight Championship. He won the match after Hogan's manager, Jimmy Hart, purposely got Hogan disqualified and then turned on him. The following night, the Giant appeared on WCW Monday Nitro wearing the championship belt; Hart, who became The Giant's manager, revealed that he had put a stipulation in the contract for the match that if Hogan lost via disqualification, he would lose his championship. WCW responded by nullifying the title change due to the circumstances surrounding it, and the championship was vacated.

The Giant then entered the sixty-man battle royal for the vacant championship at World War 3 on November 26. He was one of the final six combatants, being eliminated simultaneously with Sting and Lex Luger by Hogan. The Giant did not leave the ring upon being eliminated, and pulled Hogan underneath the ropes while Randy Savage was eliminating the One Man Gang from the match. The referee did not see the Giant's actions, only that Hogan was on the floor, and thus awarded the match and the title to Savage. The Giant teamed with Ric Flair to defeat Hogan and Savage at Clash of the Champions XXXII in January 1996, but was defeated by Hogan in a cage match at SuperBrawl VI the following month. A grudge between the Giant and fellow Dungeon of Doom member Loch Ness soon developed over who was the only true giant of WCW, with Giant defeating Loch Ness at Uncensored in March 1996.

On the April 22, 1996 episode of WCW Monday Nitro, the Giant teamed with WCW World Heavyweight Champion Ric Flair to face WCW World Tag Team Champions Sting and Lex Luger (who was also the WCW World Television Champion) in a match with all three titles on the line. The match ended in a disqualification when Flair accidentally threw hot coffee in the Giant's eyes, leading the Giant to issue a challenge to Flair. Later that night (in a match that aired on April 29, 1996), the Giant pinned Flair following a chokeslam to win the WCW World Heavyweight Championship for a second time. At Slamboree in May 1996, he successfully defended the title against Sting. At The Great American Bash in June 1996, he successfully defended the title against Lex Luger. At Bash at the Beach in July 1996, the Giant teamed with Kevin Sullivan to defeat Arn Anderson and Chris Benoit. After Hulk Hogan formed the New World Order (nWo), he defeated the Giant for the title at Hog Wild on August 10, 1996 following interference from Scott Hall and Kevin Nash.

==== New World Order (1996–1999) ====
The Giant joined the nWo in September 1996, citing Ted DiBiase's money as his primary motivation. At Fall Brawl '96: War Games later that month, he defeated Randy Savage with the assistance of Scott Hall and Kevin Nash. He went on to feud with Lex Luger and the Four Horsemen. At Halloween Havoc in October 1996, he defeated aspiring Four Horsemen member Jeff Jarrett by disqualification after Four Horsemen leader Ric Flair gave him a low blow.

After winning the World War 3 match at World War 3 in November 1996, the Giant asked Hogan for a World Heavyweight Championship title match. For this, he was thrown out of the nWo on December 30. He fought against the nWo along with Sting and Luger, winning the WCW World Tag Team Championship twice. The Giant began a feud with nWo member Kevin Nash, who constantly dodged the Giant, including no-showing their scheduled match at Starrcade in December 1997. At Souled Out in January 1998, the two finally met in the ring, with Nash accidentally injuring the Giant's neck when he botched his signature jackknife powerbomb. The botch was worked into a storyline, according to which Nash had intentionally dropped the Giant on his head in order to break his neck.

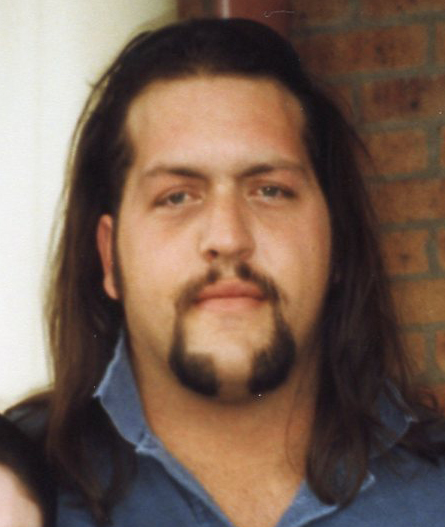
Wight in April 1999

When Nash left the nWo and formed his own stable, the nWo Wolfpac, the Giant re-joined the original nWo to oppose Nash and his allies. While back with the nWo, the Giant won two more WCW World Tag Team Championships, once with Sting as an unwilling partner (as the match was signed before the Giant returned to the nWo) and once with Scott Hall. In the interim between those two reigns, he lost his half of the titles to Sting in a singles match where only the winner would remain champion and could choose a new partner. On the October 12, 1998 episode of Nitro, Bill Goldberg defeated the Giant in a no-disqualification match. In a show of strength, Goldberg executed a delayed vertical suplex before executing the Jackhammer on the Giant. After the nWo Hollywood and nWo Wolfpac stables merged again in January 1999, Hogan declared that there was only room for one "giant" in the group, forcing Giant and Nash to wrestle for that spot. On the January 11, 1999 episode of WCW Monday Nitro, Nash defeated Giant following a run-in by Scott Hall and Eric Bischoff. The Giant was then attacked by the entire nWo; this marked Wight's final appearance in WCW. On the "Building An Army" episode of the Monday Night War feature from the WWE Network, Wight stated that he was making a fraction of what the main eventers were making and his salary was not increased after he requested it be by Eric Bischoff; as a result, Wight allowed his WCW contract to expire on February 8, 1999, his 27th birthday.

=== World Wrestling Federation / World Wrestling Entertainment (1999–2007) ===
==== WWF Champion (1999–2003) ====
Wight signed a ten-year contract with the World Wrestling Federation in the midst of the promotion's "Attitude Era". He debuted on February 14, 1999 under the name "Paul Wight" at St. Valentine's Day Massacre: In Your House, establishing himself as a member of Vince McMahon's villainous stable, the Corporation. During McMahon's cage match against Stone Cold Steve Austin, Wight tore through the canvas from underneath the ring and attacked Austin, establishing himself as a heel. After he threw Austin into the side of the cage, the cage broke, causing Austin to fall outside to the floor, resulting in Austin winning the match. Wight served as McMahon's enforcer and was renamed Big Show.

At WrestleMania XV on March 28, Big Show faced Mankind for the right to referee the main event between Austin and The WWF Champion, the Corporation's The Rock. Big Show incapacitated Mankind and was disqualified. After the match, McMahon slapped Big Show, so he punched McMahon, turning face and leaving The Corporation. Big Show lost to Mankind in a Boiler Room Brawl at Backlash on April 25. Big Show and Mankind eventually formed a stable with Test and Ken Shamrock known as The Union, who fought against the Corporation and later The Corporate Ministry. At Fully Loaded on July 25, Big Show defeated Kane.

Big Show turned heel again by teaming with The Undertaker; they won the WWF Tag Team Championship from Kane and X-Pac at SummerSlam on August 22, but lost them to Mankind and The Rock the following week on Raw is War. Big Show and The Undertaker regained the titles in a Buried Alive match on the September 9 episode of SmackDown!, before losing them again on the September 20 episode of Raw is War.

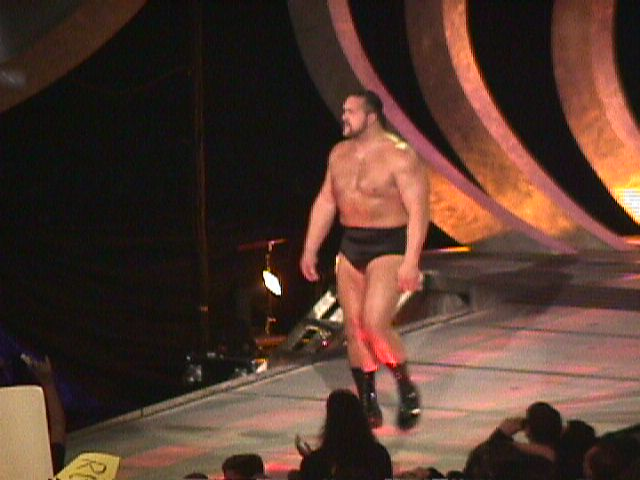
Big Show entering Nassau Coliseum via the SmackDown! entranceway in October 1999

After The Undertaker was side-lined with injuries, Big Show turned face once again and began a feud with the Big Boss Man around the death of Big Show's father (in reality, Wight's father had died years before). During Big Show's feud, they taped a segment where Big Boss Man invaded the funeral and used a chain to steal the coffin. At Survivor Series on November 14, Big Show replaced Austin in a triple threat match against The Rock and WWF Champion Triple H after he was (kayfabe) run over by a car, winning the WWF Championship. Big Show retained the title at Armageddon on December 12 against Big Boss Man, before losing it to Triple H on the January 3, 2000 episode of Raw is War.

At the Royal Rumble on January 23, Big Show was the last man eliminated in the Royal Rumble match by The Rock. They started a storyline where Big Show turned heel once again by producing a videotape that showed The Rock's feet striking the ground first, leading to a match with The Rock at No Way Out on February 27, with the WrestleMania title shot on the line, which Big Show won. The Rock was desperate to reclaim his title shot and eventually agreed to a match with Big Show on the March 13 episode of Raw – if he won, the WrestleMania title match would become a triple threat match, and if he lost, he would retire from the WWF. Shane McMahon, now actively supporting Big Show's bid to become champion, appointed himself as the special guest referee, however, The Rock defeated Big Show when Vince assaulted Shane and donned the referee shirt, personally making the three count. On the March 20 episode of Raw, Triple H defended the title against The Rock and Big Show on the condition that the match would not take place at WrestleMania 2000 on April 2, pinning Big Show. Linda McMahon stated this match would not occur at WrestleMania as Triple H would defend the title there in a fatal four-way elimination match with Mick Foley as the fourth man, but Big Show was the first man eliminated from the match.

Big Show turned face again and took on a comical gimmick where he began mimicking other wrestlers, lampooning Rikishi as Showkishi, The Berzerker as Shonan the Barbarian and Val Venis as The Big Showbowski. Big Show defeated Kurt Angle at Backlash on April 30 dressed like Hulk Hogan as the Showster. Shane voiced his disapproval of Big Show's antics, leading to a Falls Count Anywhere match at Judgment Day on May 21, which Big Show lost. Big Show returned two months later, apparently intending to gain revenge on Shane. Instead, Big Show turned heel again and attacked The Undertaker and sided with Shane once more, forming a short-lived stable known as "The Conspiracy" with Shane, Chris Benoit, Kurt Angle and Edge and Christian. After The Undertaker threw Big Show off a stage through a table on the August 7 episode of Raw is War, he was removed from WWF television for the remainder of the year and sent to the WWF's developmental territory, Ohio Valley Wrestling, to lose weight and improve his cardiovascular fitness.

At the Royal Rumble on January 21, 2001, Big Show made a surprise return as the 23rd entrant in the Royal Rumble match but was immediately eliminated by The Rock. Big Show won the WWF Hardcore Championship from Raven at No Way Out on February 25, but lost it back to Raven on the March 19 episode of Raw is War. Big Show lost to Kane in a triple threat match for the Hardcore Championship also involving Raven at WrestleMania X-Seven on April 1. Big Show lost to Shane McMahon, the on-screen owner of WCW, in a Last Man Standing match at Backlash on April 29. Big Show then turned face and, throughout The Invasion, remained loyal to the WWF. At Invasion on July 22, Big Show teamed with Albert and Billy Gunn in a loss to Chris Kanyon, Hugh Morrus and Shawn Stasiak. Big Show was also part of the victorious Team WWF at Survivor Series on November 18.

On the March 25, 2002 episode of Raw, Big Show was drafted to the Raw brand. On the April 22 episode of Raw, Big Show turned heel again when he chokeslammed Stone Cold Steve Austin during a tag team match against X-Pac and Scott Hall, joining the nWo in the process. At Judgment Day on May 19, Big Show and Ric Flair lost to Austin in a handicap match. After the stable disbanded due to Kevin Nash getting injured, Big Show achieved little success on Raw, notably losing to Booker T in a No Disqualification match at Vengeance on July 21.

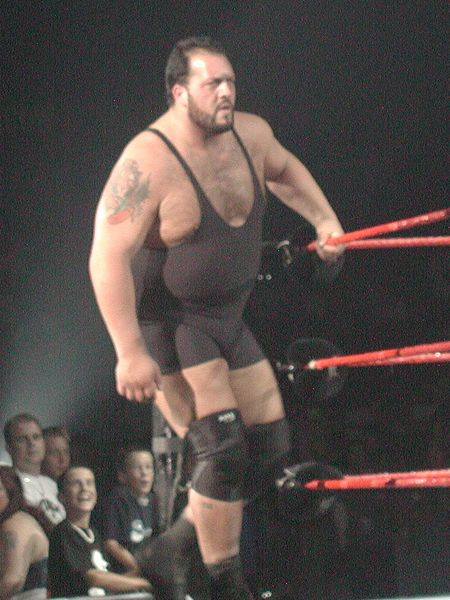
Big Show entering the ring in September 2002

In October, Big Show was traded to the SmackDown! brand, immediately challenging Brock Lesnar for the WWE Championship, which he won at Survivor Series on November 17, ending Lesnar's undefeated streak with help from Paul Heyman. Big Show lost the title to Angle at Armageddon on December 15. At the Royal Rumble on January 19, 2003, Big Show lost a Royal Rumble qualifying match to Lesnar. Big Show then began feuding with The Undertaker after Big Show threw him off the stage, injuring his neck. Big Show lost to The Undertaker on February 23 at No Way Out and teamed with A-Train in a loss to The Undertaker at WrestleMania XIX on March 30. After defeating Rey Mysterio on April 27 at Backlash, Big Show renewed his feud with Lesnar, but failed to win the WWE Championship in a stretcher match at Judgment Day on May 18. In a title rematch on the June 12 episode of SmackDown!, Lesnar superplexed Big Show off the ropes and the ring imploded. On the June 26 episode of SmackDown!, Big Show, Shelton Benjamin and Charlie Haas defeated Mr. America (a disguised Hulk Hogan), Lesnar and Angle when Big Show pinned Mr. America, which was Hogan's last appearance as Mr. America. Big Show again failed to win the WWE Championship in a triple threat match at Vengeance on July 27.

==== United States Champion (2003–2005) ====
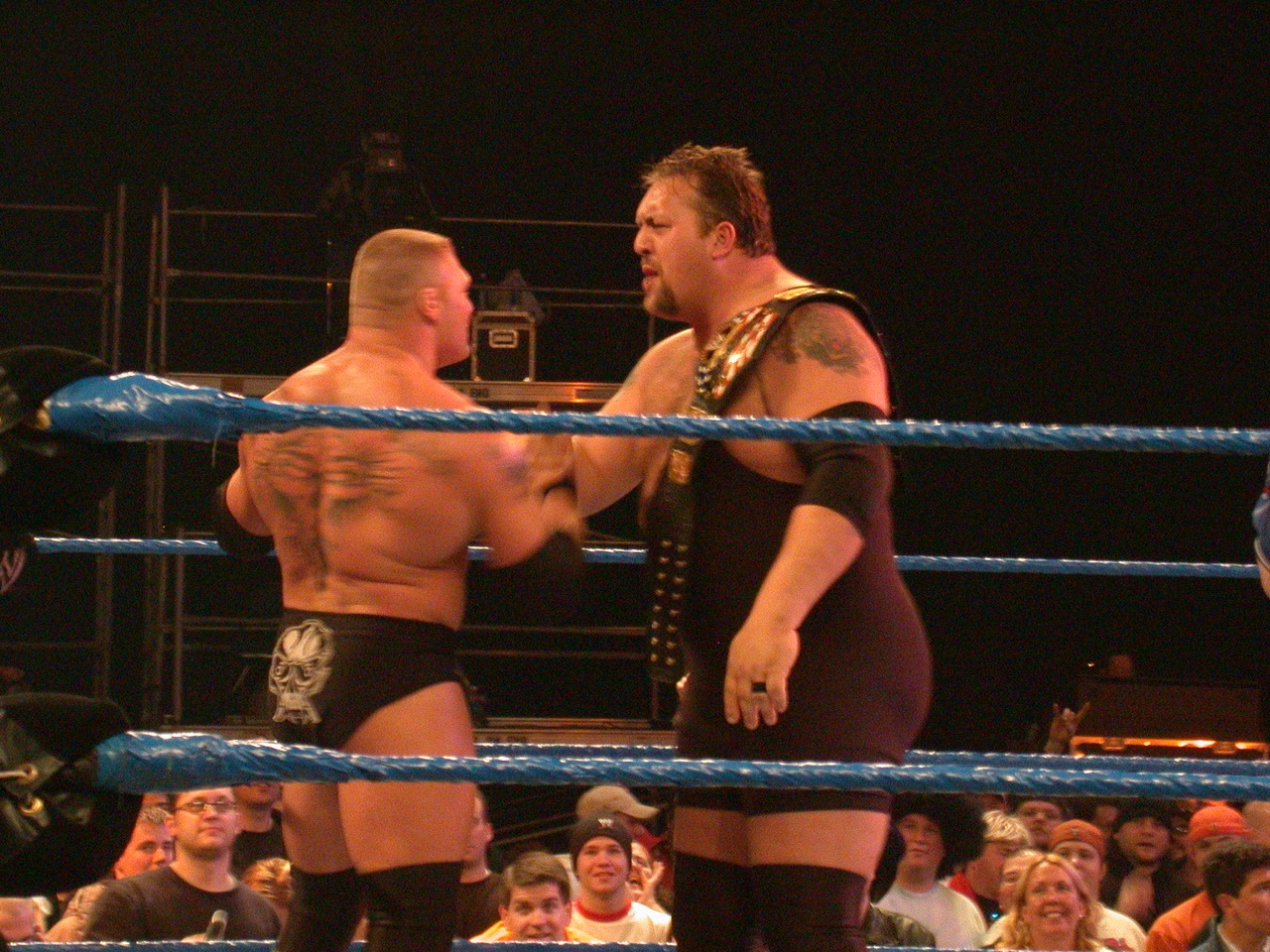
Big Show as United States Champion in the ring with Brock Lesnar in February 2004

At No Mercy on October 19, Big Show defeated Eddie Guerrero for the WWE United States Championship. Big Show was a part of Lesnar's team at Survivor Series on November 16, but was eliminated by John Cena. Big Show was the last man eliminated by Chris Benoit at the Royal Rumble on January 25, 2004 and failed to win a triple threat match for a WWE Championship match at WrestleMania XX at No Way Out on February 15. At WrestleMania on March 14, Big Show lost the United States Championship to Cena.

On the April 15 episode of SmackDown!, Big Show promised to quit if he lost to Guerrero that night, which he did, and, believing that Torrie Wilson had laughed at him for losing, upended her car and threatened to throw her off a ledge. SmackDown! General Manager Angle ascended the ledge to try to talk some reason into Big Show, but he chokeslammed Angle off the ledge, (kayfabe) concussing him, breaking his leg and causing the back of Angle's head to bleed. Big Show was not seen or mentioned on television for months as he underwent knee surgery. In August, Big Show was reinstated by new general manager Theodore Long as he interfered during a lumberjack match between Guerrero and Angle on the September 9 episode of SmackDown!. Big Show had a choice to face either Guerrero or Angle at No Mercy on October 3, choosing to fight Angle, turning face in the process. Big Show defeated Angle at No Mercy. In the weeks before the match, Big Show claimed to have "lost his dignity" when Angle tranquilized him in the middle of the ring using a dart gun and shaved his head on the fifth anniversary episode of SmackDown!. At Armageddon on December 12, Big Show defeated Angle, Mark Jindrak and Luther Reigns in a handicap match.

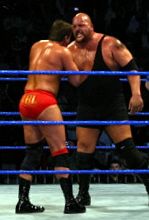
Big Show about to chokeslam JBL in January 2005

Big Show unsuccessfully challenged John "Bradshaw" Layfield (JBL) for the WWE Championship in a triple threat match involving Angle at the Royal Rumble on January 30, 2005, and in a barbed wire steel cage match at No Way Out on February 20. At WrestleMania 21 on April 3, Big Show faced Sumo Grand Champion Akebono in a worked sumo match. In the weeks preceding the match, Big Show pushed over a jeep driven to the ring by Luther Reigns to show that he was capable of moving the marginally heavier Akebono. Big Show lost to Akebono at WrestleMania 21. Big Show subsequently feuded with Carlito and his bodyguard, Matt Morgan, losing to Carlito at Judgment Day on May 22 after Morgan interfered.

On the June 27 episode of Raw, Big Show was drafted to the Raw brand in the 2005 WWE draft lottery, defeating Gene Snitsky in a tag team match, which turned into a singles match when both men's partners brawled backstage. Big Show and Snitsky continued feuding over the next few weeks in singles and tag team matches on Raw. At Unforgiven on September 18, Big Show defeated Snitsky. On the September 26 episode of Raw, Big Show defeated Snitsky again in a Street Fight to end their feud.

==== Teaming with Kane (2005–2006) ====
On the October 17 episode of Raw, Big Show defeated Edge and was entered in an online opinion poll, with the winner of the poll facing John Cena and Kurt Angle in a Triple Threat match for the WWE Championship at Taboo Tuesday on November 1. The poll was won by Shawn Michaels, meaning that the other two wrestlers competed for the World Tag Team Championship. At Taboo Tuesday, Big Show teamed with Kane to defeat Lance Cade and Trevor Murdoch for the World Tag Team Championship. They successfully defended the titles against Cade and Murdoch in a hardcore match on the November 7 episode of Raw.

In the weeks preceding Survivor Series on November 27, Big Show became involved in the rivalry between the Raw and SmackDown! brands. Big Show and Kane invaded the November 11 episode of SmackDown! and, along with Edge, attacked and inadvertently injured Batista. On the November 21 episode of Raw, Big Show and Kane "injured" Batista by delivering a double chokeslam onto the windshield of a car. At Survivor Series, Big Show, Kane, Carlito, Chris Masters and team captain Michaels represented Raw in a match with Team SmackDown! (JBL, Rey Mysterio, Bobby Lashley, Randy Orton and Batista). Big Show was eliminated by Mysterio and Team SmackDown! won the match, with Orton being the sole survivor. Following the event, Big Show and Kane began feuding with WWE Tag Team Champions Mysterio and Batista, leading to a tag team match at Armageddon on December 18, which Big Show and Kane won.

The week prior on Raw, Big Show lost a qualifying match for a shot at the WWE Championship in an Elimination Chamber match at New Year's Revolution on January 8, 2006 to Michaels by disqualification after Triple H hit Michaels with a chair, intentionally costing Big Show the match and the title shot. In retaliation, Big Show cost Triple H his qualifying match with Kane later that evening. At New Year's Revolution, Triple H defeated Big Show after striking him in the head with his sledgehammer and a Pedigree.

Big Show and Kane next feuded with Masters and Carlito, who they defeated to retain the World Tag Team Championship on April 2 at WrestleMania 22. The following night on Raw, Big Show and Kane lost the championship to Spirit Squad members Kenny and Mikey following copious interference from the other members of the Spirit Squad. They faced Spirit Squad members Johnny and Nicky in a rematch one week later, but lost via disqualification after Kane "snapped" and left the ring to attack the other members of the Spirit Squad. The ensuing feud between Kane and Big Show culminated in a match at Backlash on April 30 that ended in a no contest.

==== ECW World Heavyweight Champion (2006–2007) ====
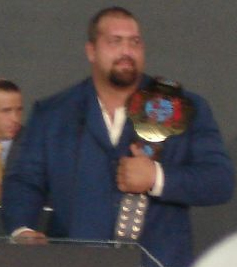
Big Show as the ECW World Heavyweight Champion in July 2006

At WWE vs. ECW Head-to-Head on June 7, Big Show joined the newly debuted ECW brand as he removed his Raw shirt to reveal an ECW shirt during a twenty-man battle royal including members of the Raw and SmackDown! rosters against members of the ECW roster, which he won by last eliminating Randy Orton. Big Show then appeared at ECW One Night Stand on June 11, attacking Tajiri, Super Crazy and The Full Blooded Italians after their tag team match.

On the July 4 episode of ECW, Big Show defeated Rob Van Dam to win the ECW World Heavyweight Championship with the assistance of ECW's Representative Paul Heyman, who declined to make the three-count for Van Dam after he performed the Five Star Frog Splash on Big Show. Heyman then instructed Big Show to chokeslam Van Dam onto a chair before making the three-count so Big Show won the title, making him the first non-ECW Original to hold it. The fans almost rioted when Big Show won the title, throwing drinks and empty cups into the ring as Heyman and Big Show celebrated, turning heel in the process. The victory made him the first ever professional wrestler to hold the WWE Championship, WCW World Heavyweight Championship and ECW World Heavyweight Championship. Big Show made his first successful defense against Ric Flair on the July 11 episode of ECW. Big Show lost to The Undertaker at The Great American Bash on July 23 in the first ever Punjabi Prison match, replacing The Great Khali, who was removed by SmackDown! General Manager Theodore Long and replaced with Big Show as punishment for an attack on The Undertaker shortly before the match. Big Show defeated Kane to retain the now renamed ECW World Championship two nights later on ECW. Big Show also had a brief feud with Sabu, whom he defeated at SummerSlam on August 20 to retain the ECW World Championship. Also at SummerSlam, Big Show was one of the "resources" used by Vince and Shane McMahon in their match against D-Generation X (DX). Big Show teamed with Vince and Shane against Triple H and Shawn Michaels in a 3-on-2 handicap Hell in a Cell match at Unforgiven on September 17, which was won by DX. During the match, DX shoved Vince's head up Big Show's buttocks in a mockery of Vince's Kiss My Ass Club.

At Cyber Sunday on November 5, Big Show faced John Cena and King Booker in a Champion of Champions match, with the fans voting for King Booker's World Heavyweight Championship to be on the line. Big Show lost the match when King Booker pinned Cena following interference from Kevin Federline, who was beginning a feud with Cena. At Survivor Series on November 26, Big Show competed in the traditional 10-man Survivor Series tag team match, but was the last man pinned by Cena. Big Show then began a feud with Bobby Lashley, who left SmackDown! to join the ECW brand to participate in the Extreme Elimination Chamber match for the ECW World Championship at December to Dismember on December 3, where Big Show lost the title to Lashley. Following an unsuccessful rematch two nights later on ECW, Big Show took time off to heal from injuries. On March 8, 2007, it was announced that Big Show's WWE contract had expired.

=== Memphis Wrestling (2007) ===
Wight replaced Jerry Lawler when the WWE withdrew him from a match with former nWo partner Hulk Hogan at PMG Clash of Legends on April 27, 2007. Introduced as Paul "The Great" Wight, he stated that "Big Show" was his slave name and he did not want to be owned anymore. Wight lost the match to Hogan.

=== Return to WWE (2008–2021) ===
==== Unified WWE Tag Team Champion (2008–2010) ====
On February 17, 2008, at No Way Out, a much slimmer looking Big Show made his return to WWE television, attempting to attack Rey Mysterio after his World Heavyweight Championship match with Edge but got into a physical confrontation with boxer Floyd Mayweather Jr. after Mayweather came from the crowd to challenge Big Show. The confrontation ended with Mayweather breaking Big Show's nose with a punching combination. Big Show lost to Mayweather at WrestleMania XXIV on March 30 by knockout after a shot to the jaw with brass knuckles. Big Show then turned face in a feud with The Great Khali, defeating him at Backlash on April 27.

At One Night Stand on June 1, Big Show defeated CM Punk, John Morrison, Chavo Guerrero and Tommy Dreamer in a Singapore Cane match to become the number one contender for the ECW Championship at Night of Champions on June 29. During the bout, Big Show received a black eye and deep gash along the eyebrow, which required stitches after Morrison swung a Singapore cane to his knee, which caused him to fall with the steps. As he fell, the steps accidentally moved to the right, which hit Big Show in the eye. Big Show failed to win the title in a triple threat match at Night of Champions after Mark Henry pinned Kane to win the title.

Big Show was then assigned to the SmackDown brand, where he turned heel by siding with Vickie Guerrero in her ongoing feud with The Undertaker, attacking him at Unforgiven on September 7. Big Show defeated The Undertaker by knockout at No Mercy on October 5. However, Big Show lost to The Undertaker in a fan-voted Last Man Standing match at Cyber Sunday on October 26 and a casket match at Survivor Series on November 23. On the December 5 episode of SmackDown, Big Show lost to The Undertaker in a steel cage match to end their feud. At No Way Out on February 15, 2009, Big Show competed in an Elimination Chamber match for the WWE Championship, but was eliminated by Triple H.

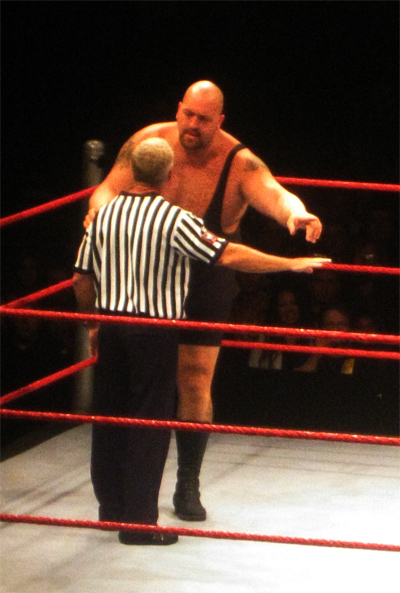
Big Show arguing with referee Scott Armstrong at a live event in June 2009

In March, it was revealed by John Cena that the Big Show was having secret relations with Guerrero. At WrestleMania 25 on April 5, Big Show was involved in a triple threat match for the World Heavyweight Championship, which was won by Cena. On April 13, Big Show was drafted to the Raw brand as a part of the 2009 WWE draft. At Backlash on April 26, Big Show interfered in Cena and Edge's Last Man Standing match for the title, throwing Cena into a spotlight, resulting in Edge winning the title and Cena being seriously injured. Big Show lost to Cena at Judgment Day on May 17 and at Extreme Rules on June 7 in a submission match, before defeating him on the June 22 episode of Raw to end the feud.

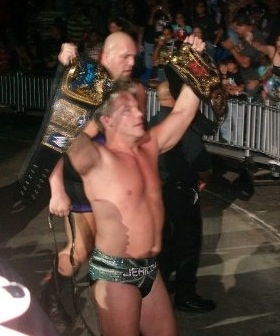
Big Show and Chris Jericho, known as Jeri-Show, as the Unified WWE Tag Team Champions in September 2009

At Night of Champions on July 26, Big Show was introduced as Chris Jericho's new tag team partner due to Edge needing time off to tend to an injury. Together, Jeri-Show successfully defended the Unified WWE Tag Team Championship against The Legacy. Jeri-Show successfully defended the titles against Cryme Tyme at SummerSlam on August 23, MVP and Mark Henry at Breaking Point on September 13 and Rey Mysterio and Batista at Hell in a Cell on October 4. At Bragging Rights on October 25, Big Show represented Team Raw, but betrayed and attacked his teammates, which led to Team SmackDown winning so that he could receive an opportunity at the World Heavyweight Championship. At Survivor Series on November 22, Big Show failed to win the title in a triple threat match against The Undertaker and Jericho. Jeri-Show lost the Unified WWE Tag Team Championship at TLC: Tables, Ladders and Chairs on December 13 to D-Generation X (DX) in a Tables, Ladders and Chairs match. As a member of the SmackDown roster, Jericho could only appear on Raw as a champion, so DX intentionally disqualified themselves in a rematch to force Jericho off the show. On the January 4, 2010 episode of Raw, DX again defeated Jeri-Show, ending their team.

On the February 8 episode of Raw, Big Show regained the titles from DX with his new tag team partner The Miz in a triple threat tag team elimination match also involving the Straight Edge Society (CM Punk and Luke Gallows). On February 16, Big Show and The Miz successfully defended the titles against Yoshi Tatsu and Goldust on the final episode of ECW. On the March 1 episode of Raw, Big Show and The Miz defeated DX in their rematch. At WrestleMania XXVI on March 28, Big Show and The Miz retained the titles against John Morrison and R-Truth. At Extreme Rules on April 25, ShoMiz competed in a tag team gauntlet match where the team that beat them would earn a title match the next night on Raw. In the gauntlet, ShoMiz defeated Morrison and R-Truth and MVP and Henry, before losing to The Hart Dynasty (David Hart Smith and Tyson Kidd). On the April 26 episode of Raw, ShoMiz lost the Unified WWE Tag Team Championship to The Hart Dynasty.

==== Championship pursuits and reunion with Kane (2010–2011) ====
Following the match, Big Show attacked The Miz with a knockout punch and hugged Theodore Long, turning face in the process. Later in the night, as part of the 2010 WWE Draft, Big Show was drafted back to the SmackDown brand. Four days later on SmackDown, Big Show was named the number one contender for the World Heavyweight Championship and began feuding with champion Jack Swagger. Big Show defeated Swagger via disqualification at Over the Limit on May 23, but did not win the title. With this victory, Big Show qualified for a fatal four-way match for the World Heavyweight Championship at Fatal 4-Way on June 20, but lost as Rey Mysterio won the title. On the following episode of SmackDown, Swagger debuted his new ankle lock finishing move and applied it on Big Show, injuring his ankle. Big Show then feuded with Punk and his Straight Edge Society, unmasking Punk to reveal his bald head on the July 16 episode of SmackDown. Big Show failed to win the SmackDown Money in the Bank ladder match at Money in the Bank on July 18. Big Show next unmasked the mysterious masked member of the SES, who was revealed as Joey Mercury. Big Show defeated the SES in a 3-on-1 handicap match at SummerSlam on August 15 and Punk at Night of Champions on September 19. At Bragging Rights on October 24, Big Show was the captain of Team SmackDown; despite being counted out with Sheamus, his team was victorious. Big Show was on Mysterio's team at Survivor Series on November 21, where he and Mysterio won as the remaining survivors.

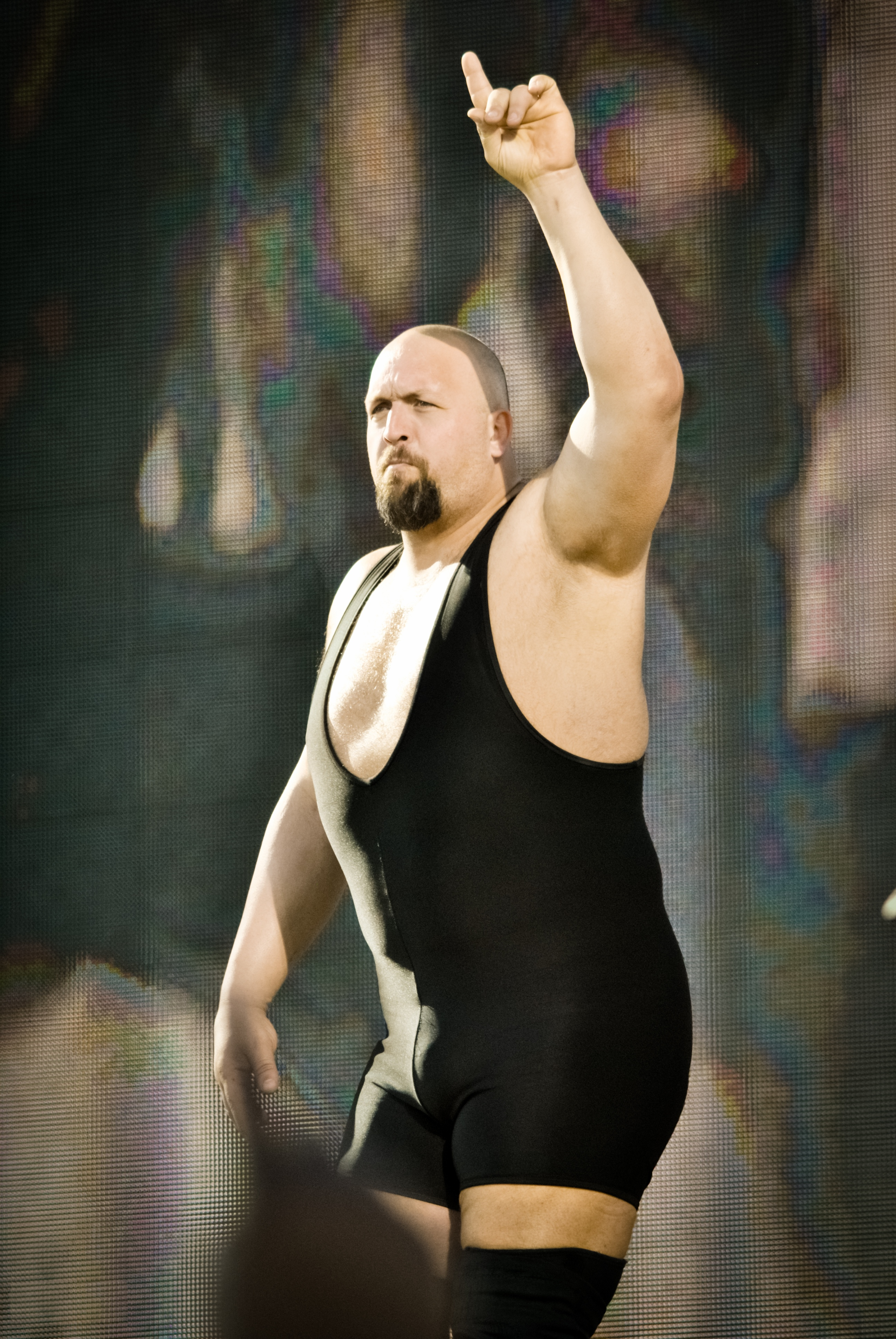
Big Show at Tribute to Troops in December 2010

On the January 7, 2011 episode of SmackDown, Big Show lost a fatal four-way match to determine the number one contender for the World Heavyweight Championship due to interference by former Nexus leader Wade Barrett. The next week, Big Show defeated Barrett via disqualification when former Nexus members Heath Slater and Justin Gabriel attacked him. Ezekiel Jackson then appeared to help Big Show, but instead attacked him. Barrett, Slater, Gabriel and Jackson formed the Corre and continued to assault Big Show in the following weeks. At Elimination Chamber on February 20, Big Show participated in an Elimination Chamber match for the World Heavyweight Championship, eliminating Barrett before being eliminated by Kane.

The following month, Big Show reunited with Kane to fight the Corre, teaming with Santino Marella and Kingston to defeat them at WrestleMania XXVII on April 3. On the April 22 episode of SmackDown, Big Show and Kane defeated Corre members Gabriel and Slater to win the WWE Tag Team Championship. Big Show was drafted back to the Raw brand as a part of the 2011 WWE draft. Big Show and Kane then started feuding with the New Nexus, successfully defending the titles against Barrett and Jackson at Extreme Rules on May 1 and Punk and Mason Ryan at Over the Limit on May 22, before losing them the next night on Raw to Michael McGillicutty and David Otunga. Big Show was sidelined with an injury after being run over by Alberto Del Rio's car, driven by his ring announcer Ricardo Rodriguez. Big Show returned on the June 13 episode of Raw during a match between Kane and Del Rio, attacking Del Rio and Rodriguez.

Big Show then began feuding with Mark Henry after he attacked and injured him on the June 17 episode of SmackDown, as Big Show's frustrations and anger towards Del Rio was redirected unintentionally to Henry. At Capitol Punishment on June 19, Henry retaliated by attacking Big Show during his match and attacking him with the World's Strongest Slam through an announce table, causing Big Show to lose to Del Rio by knockout. Henry did the same thing on Kane through the broadcast table the next night on Raw after their arm wrestling match, and again on the June 27 episode of Raw when Henry broke the cage door during the steel cage match between Big Show and Del Rio, allowing Del Rio to escape. Henry then attacked Big Show with the cage door, breaking the cage viciously. On July 17, at Money in the Bank, Henry defeated Big Show. After the match, Henry fractured Big Show's fibula, keeping him out of action for almost three months.

==== World Heavyweight Champion (2011–2013) ====
On the October 7 episode of SmackDown, Big Show returned and became the number one contender for the World Heavyweight Championship after attacking Henry and chokeslamming him through the broadcast table. At Vengeance on October 23, Big Show fought Henry to a no contest after the ring collapsed following a superplex from Henry. He won a title rematch by disqualification when Henry hit Big Show with a low blow on November 20 at Survivor Series, after which he crushed Henry's ankle with a chair. At TLC: Tables, Ladders and Chairs on December 18, Big Show defeated Henry for the title in a chairs match. Afterwards, Henry knocked Big Show out with a DDT onto a chair and Daniel Bryan immediately cashed his Money in the Bank contract on Big Show to win the title, giving Big Show the shortest-ever World Heavyweight Championship reign at 45 seconds. On the January 6, 2012 episode of SmackDown, Bryan retained his title against Big Show by disqualification when he goaded Henry into attacking him. The next week on SmackDown, Big Show's rematch for the title, contested under no disqualification, no countout rules, ended in a no contest after he accidentally crashed into and injured AJ (Bryan's storyline girlfriend) at ringside. At the Royal Rumble on January 29, 2012, Big Show faced Bryan and Henry in a triple threat steel cage match for the World Heavyweight Championship, but Bryan escaped the steel cage to retain his title. At Elimination Chamber on February 19, Big Show was the second man eliminated in the titular match for the World Heavyweight Championship by Cody Rhodes.

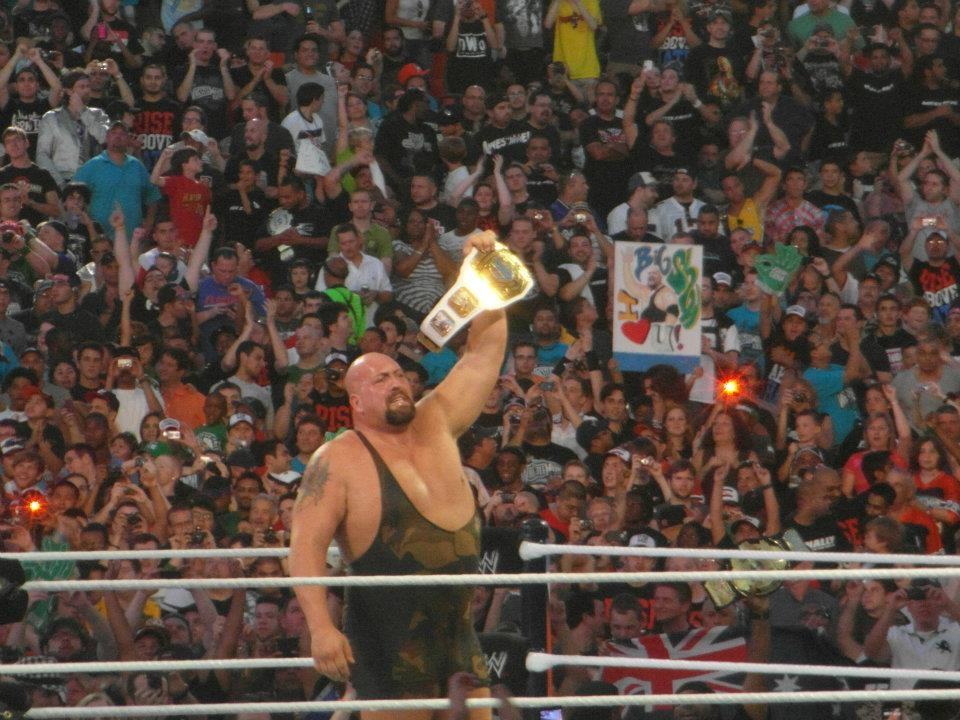
Big Show after winning the Intercontinental Championship at WrestleMania XXVIII in April 2012

In the following weeks, Big Show began a feud with Rhodes, who highlighted Big Show's embarrassing moments in previous WrestleManias, causing Big Show to lose matches in the process. At WrestleMania XXVIII on April 1, Big Show defeated Rhodes to win the Intercontinental Championship, becoming the twenty-fourth wrestler to win the Triple Crown Championship and the twelfth Grand Slam Champion in the WWE; he is the most recent wrestler to complete the original Grand Slam format. Big Show then began highlighting embarrassing moments in Rhodes' career. He lost the Intercontinental Championship back to Rhodes on April 29 at Extreme Rules in a tables match. In a rematch on the May 7 episode of Raw SuperShow, he defeated Rhodes via countout after Rhodes walked out on the match. The following week on Raw SuperShow after losing a match to Kane, Big Show was fired by Raw and SmackDown General Manager John Laurinaitis for making fun of his voice.

At Over the Limit on May 20, Big Show seemingly appeared to help John Cena in his match against Laurinaitis; instead, he knocked out Cena, allowing Laurinaitis to pin Cena and turning heel. The following night on Raw SuperShow, Big Show explained that his actions were of necessity to keep his job in the WWE, therefore resulting in Laurinaitis re-signing him to an "ironclad contract with a big fat bonus", also stating that nobody showed him any sympathy when he got fired. Due to the terms of his contract, he attacked Cena and other wrestlers over the following weeks. On the June 11 episode of Raw SuperShow, he accidentally knocked out Vince McMahon after he decided that Laurinatis would be fired if Big Show lost to Cena in a steel cage match at No Way Out on June 17, which he did, thus per stipulation, Laurinaitis was fired. At Money in the Bank on July 15, Big Show competed in the WWE Championship Money in the Bank ladder match, which Cena won. On July 23, at Raw 1000, Big Show attacked Cena during his WWE Championship match against CM Punk, causing a disqualification. The following week on Raw, a WWE Championship number one contender's match between Big Show and Cena ended in a no contest due to interference from Punk. Raw General Manager AJ Lee inserted both Big Show and Cena in the championship match at SummerSlam on August 19, but Punk retained the title.

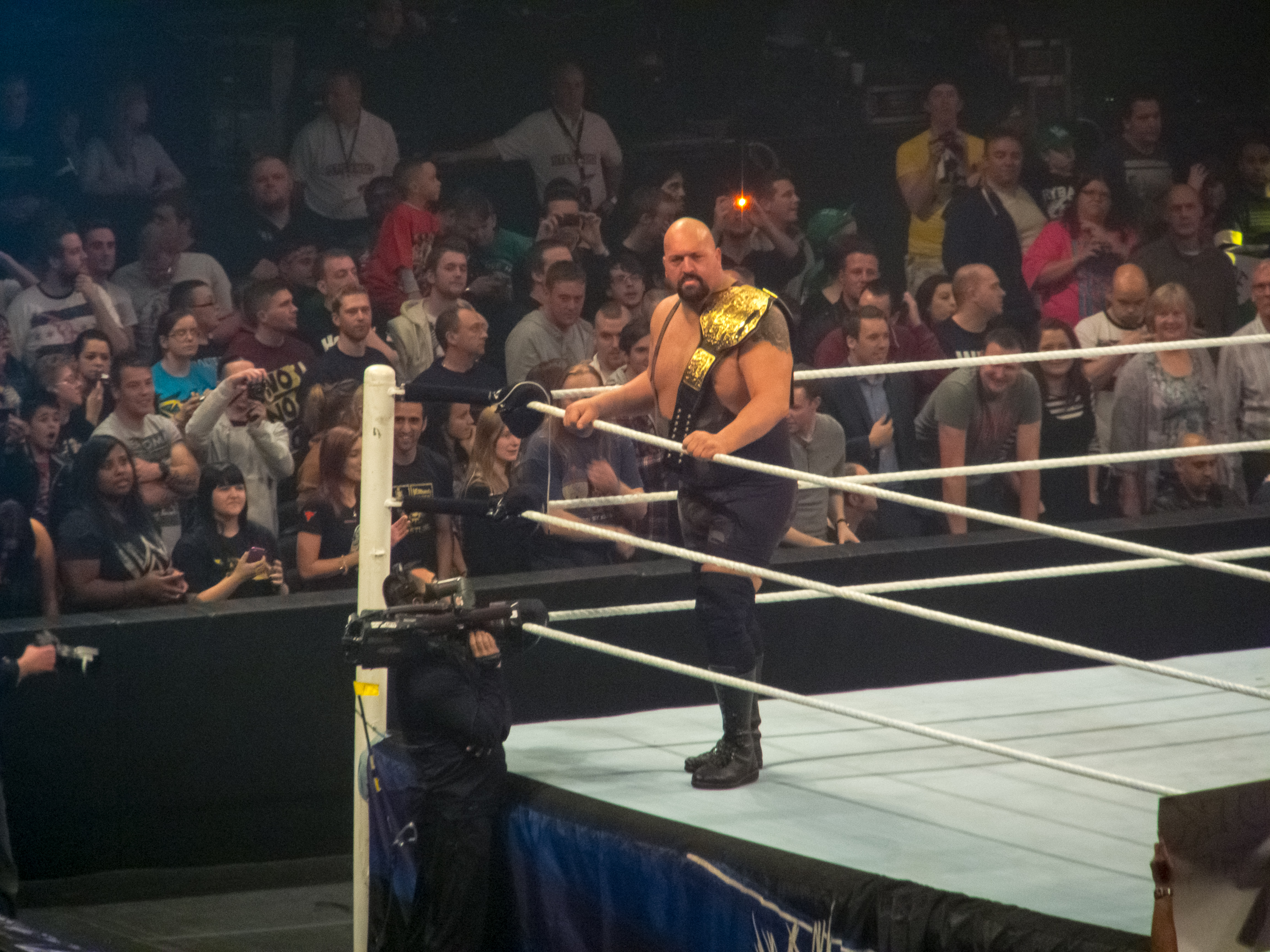
Big Show as World Heavyweight Champion in November 2012

The following month, Big Show defeated Randy Orton to become the number one contender to the World Heavyweight Championship. At Hell in a Cell on October 28, Big Show defeated Sheamus to win his second World Heavyweight Championship. On November 18, at Survivor Series, he lost a title rematch to Sheamus by disqualification, but retained the title. After the match, Sheamus attacked Big Show and repeatedly hit him with a chair. At TLC: Tables, Ladders and Chairs on December 16, Big Show defeated Sheamus in a chairs match to retain the championship. On the December 28 episode of SmackDown, Big Show defended his title against Alberto Del Rio, however, the match ended in a no-contest after Sheamus interfered and attacked Big Show. Three days later on Raw, Big Show defended the title against Del Rio's ring announcer Ricardo Rodriguez, defeating him via disqualification after Del Rio attacked Big Show from behind. On the January 11 episode of SmackDown, Big Show lost the World Heavyweight Championship to Del Rio in a Last Man Standing match, ending his reign at 72 days. He failed to regain the title from Del Rio in another Last Man Standing match on January 27 at Royal Rumble and on February 17 at Elimination Chamber.

In March, Big Show began feuding with The Shield and aligned himself with Orton and Sheamus. On the March 15 episode of SmackDown, Orton and Sheamus were allowed to pick a third partner to face the Shield in a six-man tag team match at WrestleMania 29 and originally chose Ryback. However, three days later on Raw, Ryback was booked in another match at the event, leaving the spot open. Later that night, Big Show saved the two from an attack by The Shield and was immediately recruited as their partner. At WrestleMania on April 7, Big Show, Orton and Sheamus lost to The Shield, after which Big Show knocked out both Orton and Sheamus. The following night on Raw, Orton and Sheamus faced off in a match to earn a match with Big Show, however, the match ended in a no contest after Big Show interfered. Big Show was then defeated by Orton and Sheamus in two handicap matches on SmackDown and Raw. On May 19, at Extreme Rules, Big Show lost to Orton in an Extreme Rules match.

==== The Authority (2013–2016) ====
After a hiatus, Big Show made his televised return to WWE as a face on the August 12 episode of Raw, saving Henry and Rob Van Dam from an attack by The Shield. They defeated the Shield in a six-man tag team match on the August 16 episode of SmackDown. After speaking out against COO Triple H on the following Raw, Big Show was placed into and lost a three-on-one handicap tornado tag team match against The Shield. The Authority (Triple H and Stephanie McMahon) subsequently claimed Big Show was broke, and in order to save his job, forced him to knock out his friends including Daniel Bryan, Dusty Rhodes and The Miz. At Battleground on October 6, he interfered in the WWE Championship match between Bryan and Orton (who was allied with the Authority), knocking out both of them, ending the match in a no contest. He then faced Orton for the WWE Championship in a losing effort on November 24 at Survivor Series.

At TLC: Tables, Ladders and Chairs on December 15, Big Show and Rey Mysterio unsuccessfully challenged Cody Rhodes and Goldust for the WWE Tag Team Championship in a four-way match also involving RybAxel (Ryback and Curtis Axel) and The Real Americans (Antonio Cesaro and Jack Swagger). He subsequently started a feud with Brock Lesnar, but lost to him at Royal Rumble on January 26. On April 6, Big Show participated in the André the Giant Memorial Battle Royal at WrestleMania XXX, being the last person eliminated by Cesaro. In September, he feuded with Rusev, which ended in a submission loss for Big Show on October 26 at Hell in a Cell.

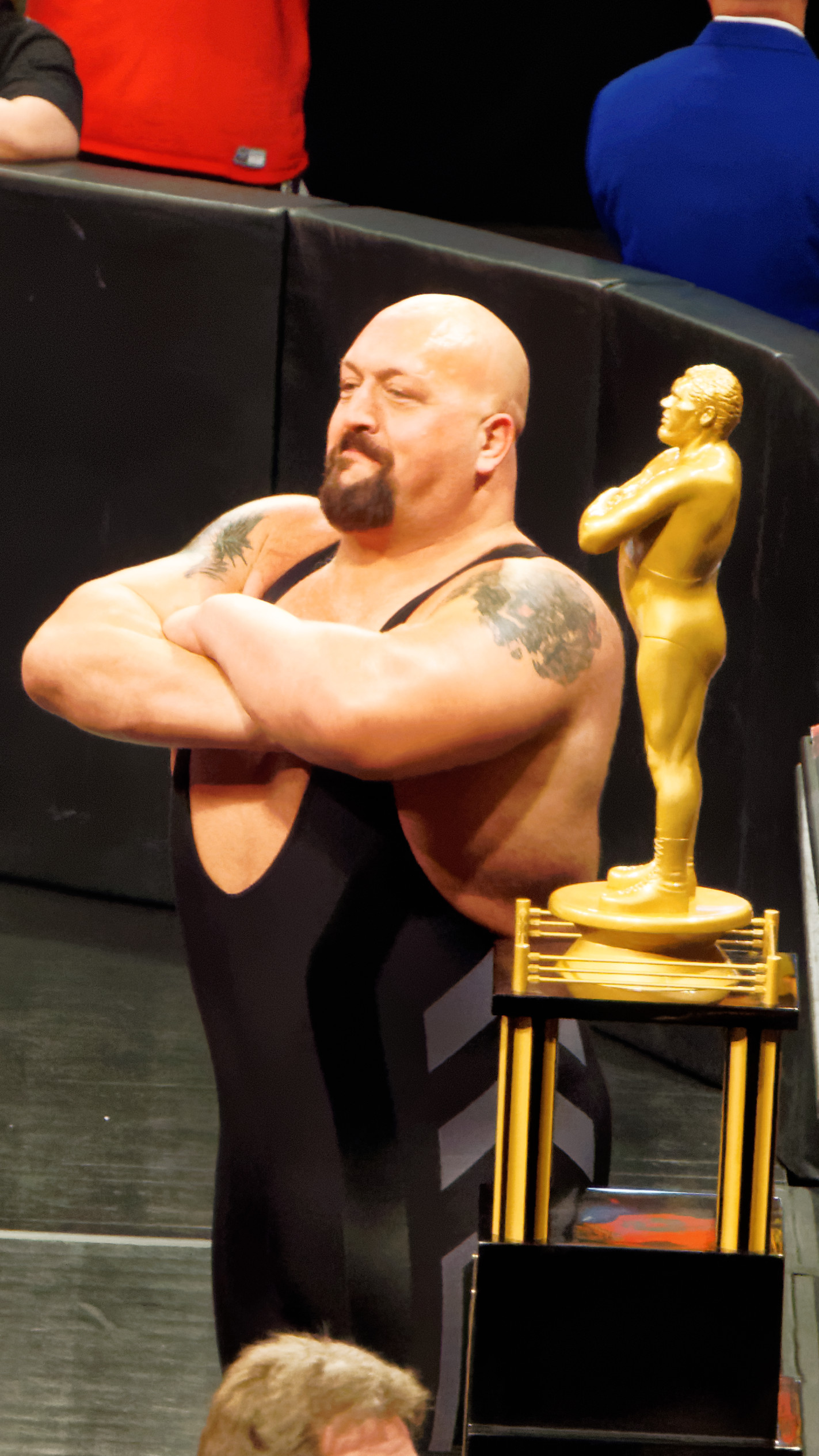
Big Show won the André the Giant Memorial Trophy in March 2015, by winning the namesake battle royal during the WrestleMania 31 Kickoff Show

On November 23, at Survivor Series, Big Show turned heel when he joined the Authority after knocking out John Cena, causing him to be eliminated from the Survivor Series elimination match against the Authority. On December 14, Big Show defeated Erick Rowan in a stairs match at Tables, Ladders, and Chairs. Later in the event, Big Show attacked Cena during his tables match with Seth Rollins, but was stopped by Roman Reigns. On January 25, 2015, at the Royal Rumble, Big Show entered the Royal Rumble match at number 29, eliminating five wrestlers before being eliminated by the eventual winner Reigns. At Fastlane on February 22, Big Show, Rollins and Kane defeated Dolph Ziggler, Rowan and Ryback. Big Show went on to win the André the Giant Memorial Battle Royal at WrestleMania 31 on March 29. At Extreme Rules on April 26, Big Show lost to Reigns in a Last Man Standing match.

After a brief hiatus, Big Show returned on the June 1 episode of Raw, where he knocked out The Miz and confronted Intercontinental Champion Ryback. At Money in the Bank on June 14, he defeated Ryback in a title match by disqualification after The Miz attacked him. He failed to win the title in a triple threat match at SummerSlam on August 23 and on the August 31 episode of Raw following a distraction from The Miz. On the November 9 episode of Raw, Big Show entered a 16-man tournament to crown a new WWE World Heavyweight Champion, but lost to Reigns in the first round.

On the January 28, 2016 episode of SmackDown, Big Show turned face by helping Reigns, Dean Ambrose and Chris Jericho fend off The Wyatt Family, whom he, Kane and Ryback defeated on February 21 at Fastlane, but lost to in a rematch the next night on Raw. At WrestleMania 32 on April 3, Big Show participated in the Andre the Giant Memorial Battle Royal; he faced off with Shaquille O'Neal, but they were eliminated simultaneously by several wrestlers. Big Show and Kane's feud with the Wyatt Family ended when they defeated Braun Strowman and Erick Rowan on the April 19 episode of Main Event.

==== Sporadic appearances (2016–2021) ====
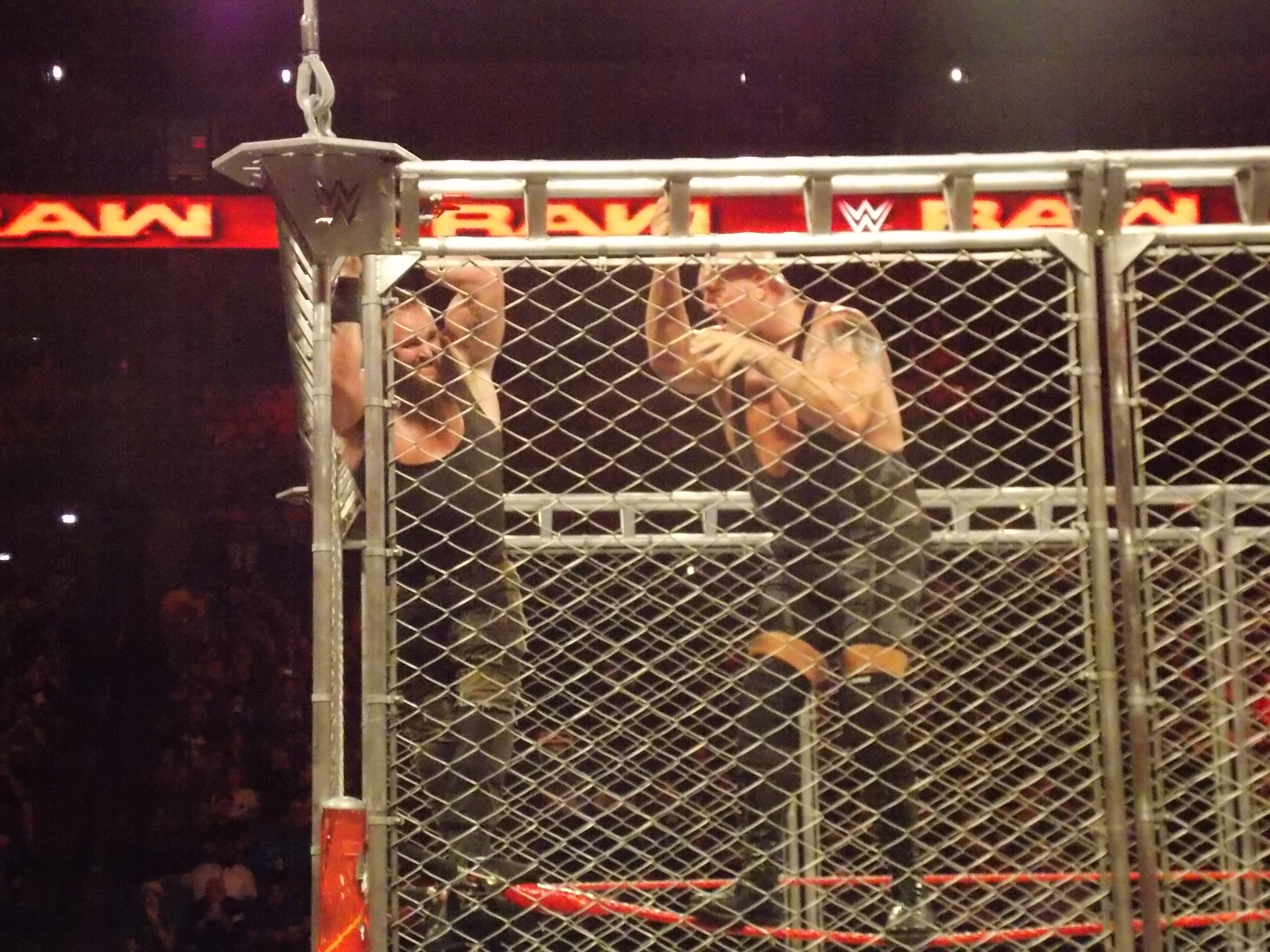
Big Show facing Braun Strowman in a cage match in September 2017

Big Show was drafted to Raw as part of the 2016 WWE draft. At Royal Rumble on January 29, 2017, he entered at number 9, but was eliminated by Strowman. After defeating Rusev on March 5 at Fastlane, he was again eliminated by Strowman in the André the Giant Memorial Battle Royal at WrestleMania 33 on April 2. Two weeks later on Raw, Big Show fought Strowman to a no contest after the ring collapsed when Strowman superplexed him. Big Show next feuded with Big Cass, but lost to him at SummerSlam on August 20. On the September 4 episode of Raw, Big Show lost to Strowman in a steel cage match, after which he was thrown through the cage by Strowman. This was done to write Big Show off television as he required hip surgery. His next appearance was on April 6, 2018, when he inducted his long-time friend and rival Mark Henry into the WWE Hall of Fame class of 2018.

Big Show returned on the October 9 episode of SmackDown, where he lost to Randy Orton. The following week, on the 1000th episode of SmackDown, Big Show formed a short-lived alliance with The Bar (Cesaro and Sheamus) by helping them defeat The New Day for the SmackDown Tag Team Championship, turning heel in the process. This alliance ended on the November 27 episode of SmackDown, after Big Show performed a KO Punch on Cesaro backstage. Following this, Big Show was written off television due to a hamstring injury. He was inactive in 2019.

On the January 6, 2020 episode of Raw, Big Show returned from injury over a year later as a face, teaming with Kevin Owens and Samoa Joe to defeat Seth Rollins and AOP via disqualification. In a match filmed after WrestleMania 36 ended, which aired on the April 6 episode of Raw, Big Show turned heel again after insulting and challenging newly crowned WWE Champion Drew McIntyre for his title in a losing effort. Big Show turned face again by helping The Street Profits and The Viking Raiders fend off the group of ninjas led by Akira Tozawa on the June 15 episode of Raw. He last wrestled in an unsanctioned match against Orton on the July 20 episode of Raw. On November 22, he appeared at Survivor Series during The Undertaker's retirement ceremony.

On January 4, 2021, Wight made his final WWE appearance on the Legends Night edition of Raw. Wight and WWE parted ways the following month after it was reported the two sides were unable to agree to financial terms on a new contract. Wight also cited "creative frustrations" and lack of ideas as reasons for his exit.

=== All Elite Wrestling (2021–present) ===
On February 24, 2021, it was announced that Wight had signed with All Elite Wrestling (AEW) under his real name and would be providing commentary alongside Tony Schiavone for their new YouTube series AEW Dark: Elevation. It was also confirmed that while commentary for Elevation would be his initial role, he would also compete as an in-ring performer. Wight debuted a week later at The Crossroads special edition of AEW Dynamite and teased "a Hall of Fame worthy" signing at Revolution four days later, which was revealed to be Christian Cage. Wight had his first match in AEW on September 5, defeating Q. T. Marshall at All Out. Over the following years, Wight continued to appear sporadically in AEW following the cancellation of Elevation. In 2023, Wight was a part of Chris Jericho and Kenny Omega's team to face The Don Callis Family in a four-on-four Street Fight, where Wight's team was victorious. In 2024 and 2025, Wight appeared on commentary for the Zero Hour edition of Full Gear. In July 2026, Wight began working as a color commentator on AEW Collision, alongside Nigel McGuinness and Tony Schiavone.

== Reception and legacy ==
Wight with members of the US Air Force in 2005

Wight has often been compared to André the Giant throughout his career due to both suffering from acromegaly and having a similar overall body structure to André. Unlike André, who was content with his fate, Wight had surgery of the pituitary gland to halt his condition. The similarities led to WCW billing him as André's son early in his career (despite no biological relation) and WWE involving him in similar angles as André. Wight has also stated that many older fans in the Southern United States (where Wight is from and where André made his home in the United States) not aware of kayfabe have often told Wight during autograph sessions how much they "loved his father when he wrestled", even though Wight's biological father was a mechanic. Wight would also outlive André, who died at age 46.

Wight is also well known for his frequent turns between face and heel throughout his career, to the point it has become a running gag among wrestling fans. Wrestling sites have estimated that through 2018 Wight has made approximately 34 turns since his WCW debut in 1995, four of those alone coming during his first year with the WWF. Wight himself acknowledged that while the frequent turns may have hurt his legacy and his mystique, he was also honored with the fact that he can play both roles well and fit in wherever he is needed to put younger talent over.

In 2011, Bleacher Report included Wight on their list of the 100 greatest wrestlers of all time. Similarly Sports Illustrated also included him on their 2016, list of the 101 greatest wrestlers of all time calling him "underrated on the mic, in the ring, athletically, technically and emotionally." In the WWE’s official list of the 30 best big men of all time Wight ranked at number 3 being dubbed "one of the most imposing men to ever enter a wrestling ring and, perhaps, the most athletically gifted Superstar to ever be called a giant."

== Other media ==
Big Show has been featured in infomercials for Stacker 2 with former NASCAR drivers Kenny Wallace and Scott Wimmer, NASCAR Xfinity Series driver Elliott Sadler, retired crew chief turned Fox Sports broadcaster Jeff Hammond, and 2002, 2005, and 2011 Sprint Cup Champion Tony Stewart. In addition, Wight appeared on the "Thong Song" remix music video by Sisqó and Foxy Brown. Wight was featured on the game show Are You Smarter than a 5th Grader?, winning $15,000 for his chosen charity, United Service Organizations. He is the only contestant to appear on two versions of the game show in two different countries. On March 31, 2012, Big Show won the first-ever Slime Wrestling World Championship at the Nickelodeon Kids' Choice Awards, defeating The Miz after throwing him into a tub of slime. In 2018, The Big Show appeared in the Wizards of the Coast's Dungeons & Dragons stream "Stream of Many Eyes Day Three - Jocks Machina" alongside Joe Manganiello, Travis Willingham, cross fit athlete Ron Mathews, and Mike Mearls as Dungeon Master.

=== Acting career ===
Wight’s first acting role was an uncredited appearance on the television show Thunder in Paradise in 1994. He played Giant Santa in the 1996 Christmas film Jingle All The Way, he also made a brief appearance in 1998s The Waterboy where he plays a pro wrestler named Captain Insano. In 2004 Wight made a cameo appearance in Star Trek: Enterprise playing one of the Orion Slavers in the episode "Borderland". In 2010 Wight made another cameo appearance on the USA show Royal Pains where he played Donald Green in the episode "Keeping The Faith". 2010 also seen Wight play Brick Hughes in the action comedy MacGruber, along with starring as Walter Krunk in the comedy film Knucklehead. In 2015 he co started in action film Vendetta alongside Dean Cain and Michael Eklund. He portrays his wrestling persona the Big Show in both Countdown (2016) and Fighting with My Family (2020).

Wight had a recurring role as Big Pink in the comedy action series Happy!. In 2020 Big Show started as a fictional version of himself in the Netflix sitcom The Big Show Show. He provided the voice of Palindrome from season 4 to 6 of the show Fast & Furious Spy Racers. Wight also voiced Ham Hand in the 2024 spy comedy film No Time to Spy.

== Filmography ==
Film
Year	Title	Role	Notes
1996	Reggie's Prayer	Mr. Portola	
1996	Jingle All The Way	Huge Santa	
1998	McCinsey's Island	Little Snow Flake	
1998	The Waterboy	Captain Insano	
2006	Little Hercules in 3-D	Marduk	
2010	MacGruber	Brick Hughes	
2010	Knucklehead	Walter Krunk	
2015	Vendetta	Victor Abbott	
2016	Countdown	Big Show	Uncredited
2017	The Jetsons & WWE: Robo-WrestleMania!	Big Show (voice)	
2019	Fighting with My Family	Big Show	
2020	Marcus	Gus Hoffman	
2024	No Time to Spy: A Loud House Movie	Ham Hand (voice)	

Television
Year	Title	Role	Notes
1994	Thunder in Paradise		Uncredited
1997	Figure It Out	Himself	
1999	Cousin Skeeter		"Skeeter's Suplex" (Season 1, Episode 17)
1999	Shasta McNasty	Himself	"Pilot"/"Brothers Out Land" (Season 1, Episode 1)
1999	The Unreal Story of Professional Wrestling	Himself	Documentary
2000	The Cindy Margolis Show	Himself	"Big Show" (Season 1, Episode 4)
2001	The Weakest Link	Himself	Episode: WWF Edition
2000	Saturday Night Live	Himself	Episode: "The Rock / AC/DC"
2002	TV Total	Himself	April 29
2002	One on One	Miles	Episode: "Is It Safe?"
2003–2004	Hollywood Squares	Himself	10 episodes
2004	Player$	Himself	Episode: "Barenaked Players"
2004	10 Things Every Guy Should Experience	Himself	Season 1, Episode 2
2004	MADtv	Himself	March 13 (Season 9, Episode 18)
2004	Star Trek: Enterprise	Orion Slaver #1	Episode: "Borderland"
2005–2007	Hogan Knows Best	Himself	Regular appearances
2005	Late Night with Conan O'Brien	Himself	
2006	Video on Trial	Himself	December 17 (Season 2, Episode 12)
2007	Hannity & Colmes	Big Show	July 2
2008	Rome Is Burning	Himself	February 26
2009	VH1 Top 20 Countdown	Himself	Host (March 7)
2009	Are You Smarter than a 5th Grader?	Himself	Australian version
2009	Are You Smarter than a 5th Grader?	Himself	American syndicated version
2009	E:60	Big Show	Episode: "Lord of the Ring"
2009	The Tonight Show with Conan O'Brien		
2009	Dinner: Impossible	Himself	Episode: "WWE: A Mission on the Mat"
2010	Extreme Makeover: Home Edition	Himself	Episode: "Suggs Family"
2010	Late Night with Jimmy Fallon	Participant	June 16 (Season 2, Episode 93)
2010	Royal Pains	Donald Green	Episode: "Keeping the Faith"
2010	The 7PM Project	Himself	July 30 (Episode 264)
2011; 2015	WWE Tough Enough	Big Show	2 episodes
2011; 2013	Supah Ninjas	Two Ton Harley	2 episodes
2011	Kids Choice Awards	Himself	Stunt driver
2011	Burn Notice	Griffin Black	Episode: "No Good Deed"
2011	The Tonight Show with Jay Leno	Himself	April 6 (Season 19, Episode 124)
2011	American Country Awards	Himself	
2012	Kids Choice Awards	Himself	wrestler against The Miz
2012	Larry King Now	Himself/Guest	"WWE Superstars" (Season 1, Episode 52)
2013	Psych	Big Ed Dixon	Episode: "Lassie Jerky"
2014	Bonus Content		"Wizard World Atlanta 2014" (Season 2, Episode 2)
2014	2014 Teen Choice Awards	Himself	
2016	Lip Sync Battle	Himself/Guest	Episode "Olivia Munn vs. Kevin Hart"
2017	Conan	Himself/Guest	(Season 7, Episode 63)
2017	The Tonight Show Starring Jimmy Fallon	Participant	(Season 4, Episode 127)
2019	Happy!	Big Pink	Recurring role
2020	The Big Show Show	Himself	Main role
2020	Nickelodeon's Unfiltered	Himself	Episode: "Pizza In Your Game Face!"
2021	Fast & Furious Spy Racers	Palindrome (voice)	Recurring role
2021	Van Helsing	Carnage	Season 4 Episode 10
2025	Ghosts	Gorm	Season 4 Episode 11

== Video games ==
WCW video games
Year	Title	Promotion	Notes
1997	WCW vs. the World	World Championship Wrestling	Video game debut
1997	WCW vs. nWo: World Tour	World Championship Wrestling	Cover athlete
1998	WCW Nitro	World Championship Wrestling	Cover athlete
1998	WCW/nWo Revenge	World Championship Wrestling	
1999	WCW/nWo Thunder	World Championship Wrestling	Cover athlete
1999	WWF WrestleMania 2000	World Wrestling Federation	WWF/E video game debut Cover athlete
2000	WWF SmackDown!	World Wrestling Federation	
2000	WWF Royal Rumble	World Wrestling Federation	
2001	WWF With Authority!	World Wrestling Federation	
2001	WWF SmackDown! Just Bring It	World Wrestling Federation	
2002	WWF Raw	World Wrestling Federation	
2002	WWE WrestleMania X8	World Wrestling Entertainment	
2002	WWE SmackDown! Shut Your Mouth	World Wrestling Entertainment	
2003	WWE Crush Hour	World Wrestling Entertainment	
2003	WWE WrestleMania XIX	World Wrestling Entertainment	
2003	WWE Raw 2	World Wrestling Entertainment	
2003	WWE SmackDown! Here Comes the Pain	World Wrestling Entertainment	
2004	WWE Day of Reckoning	World Wrestling Entertainment	
2004	WWE SmackDown! vs. Raw	World Wrestling Entertainment	
2005	WWE WrestleMania 21	World Wrestling Entertainment	
2005	WWE Day of Reckoning 2	World Wrestling Entertainment	
2005	WWE SmackDown! vs. Raw 2006	World Wrestling Entertainment	
2006	WWE SmackDown vs. Raw 2007	World Wrestling Entertainment	
2008	WWE SmackDown vs. Raw 2009	World Wrestling Entertainment	
2009	WWE Legends of WrestleMania	World Wrestling Entertainment	Importable character
2009	WWE SmackDown vs. Raw 2010	World Wrestling Entertainment	
2010	WWE SmackDown vs. Raw 2011	World Wrestling Entertainment	Cover athlete
2011	WWE All Stars	WWE	
2011	WWE '12	WWE	
2012	WWE WrestleFest	WWE	
2012	WWE '13	WWE	
2013	WWE 2K14	WWE	
2014	WWE SuperCard	WWE	
2014	WWE 2K15	WWE	
2015	WWE Immortals	WWE	
2015	WWE 2K	WWE	
2015	WWE 2K16	WWE	
2016	WWE 2K17	WWE	
2017	WWE Champions	WWE	
2017	WWE 2K18	WWE	
2018	WWE 2K19	WWE	
2019	WWE 2K20	WWE	
2020	WWE 2K Battlegrounds	WWE	
2023	AEW Fight Forever	All Elite Wrestling	AEW video game debut

== Personal life ==
Wight married his first wife, Melissa Piavis, in 1997. They separated in 2000 and their divorce was finalized in 2002. Together, they have a daughter. In 2002, he married his second wife, Bess Katramados. In his free time Wight enjoys playing video games.

For many years, Wight has been an active supporter of the Special Olympics, including the 2014 Special Olympics USA Games in New Jersey, where he participated in the opening ceremony. He was later named WWE Goodwill Ambassador for the 2015 Special Olympics World Summer Games in Los Angeles, California. Since 2018, he has served as a global ambassador for Special Olympics International. Additionally he has granted multiple wishes for Make a Wish.

=== Legal issues ===
Wight was arrested in December 1998 by the Memphis Police Department for allegedly exposing himself to a female motel employee who was the front desk clerk at a hotel in Memphis, Tennessee. The charge though was subsequently dropped due to insufficient evidence.

In March 1999, Wight was charged with assault by Robert Sawyer, who alleged that Wight had broken his jaw during the summer of 1998 in the course of an altercation at Marriott Hotels & Resorts in Uniondale, New York. Wight claimed that Sawyer had verbally abused, threatened and shoved him, and that he had responded by punching Sawyer. After three days, Judge Thomas Feinman delivered a verdict of not guilty.

In June 2009, SoBe Entertainment filled a lawsuit against Wight, his wife and WWE for $15,000,000 over breach of contract. The company claimed that during his time off from WWE, Wight signed a contract with them to train for a potential boxing career and the company would represent him $1,008,000 a year until 2012. When the boxing career never went through, SoBe stated that Wight refused to go forward with it and decided to return to WWE in 2008. SoBe also claim that Wight never revealed that he owed the IRS $450,000, they also sent out a legal letter to WWE around March 2008, advising the company that their contract with Wight and demanded that WWE would prevent his match against Mayweather from going forward, which WWE ignored.

In April 2013, WWE producer Andrew Green filled a lawsuit against Wight and WWE over alleged injuries and emotional distress he suffered during an interview with Wight after his loss against Alberto Del Rio at the 2013 Royal Rumble. Green claimed in his lawsuit that Wight refused to do the interview until he told him that WWE senior vice president Eric Pankowski wanted the wrestler to do it. During the interview, Wight physically attacked him after he got up and laced into a "profanely indecent language" towards him when Wight "grabbed him by the collar and throat, striking Green in the face and backing him up against a trunk while declaring in part, 'Are you having fun right now … Don’t ever come up to me again.'” Green also stated he was unable to work after the incident and said that he was "uncomfortable working around Big Show and the other wrestlers, nervous, and had ‘a ton of anxiety’ as a result of the attack." Both Green and his wife also sought damages for negligence, invasion of privacy, commercial appropriation of his likeness, unjust enrichment, as well as negligent hiring and retention and supervision.

== Championships and accomplishments ==
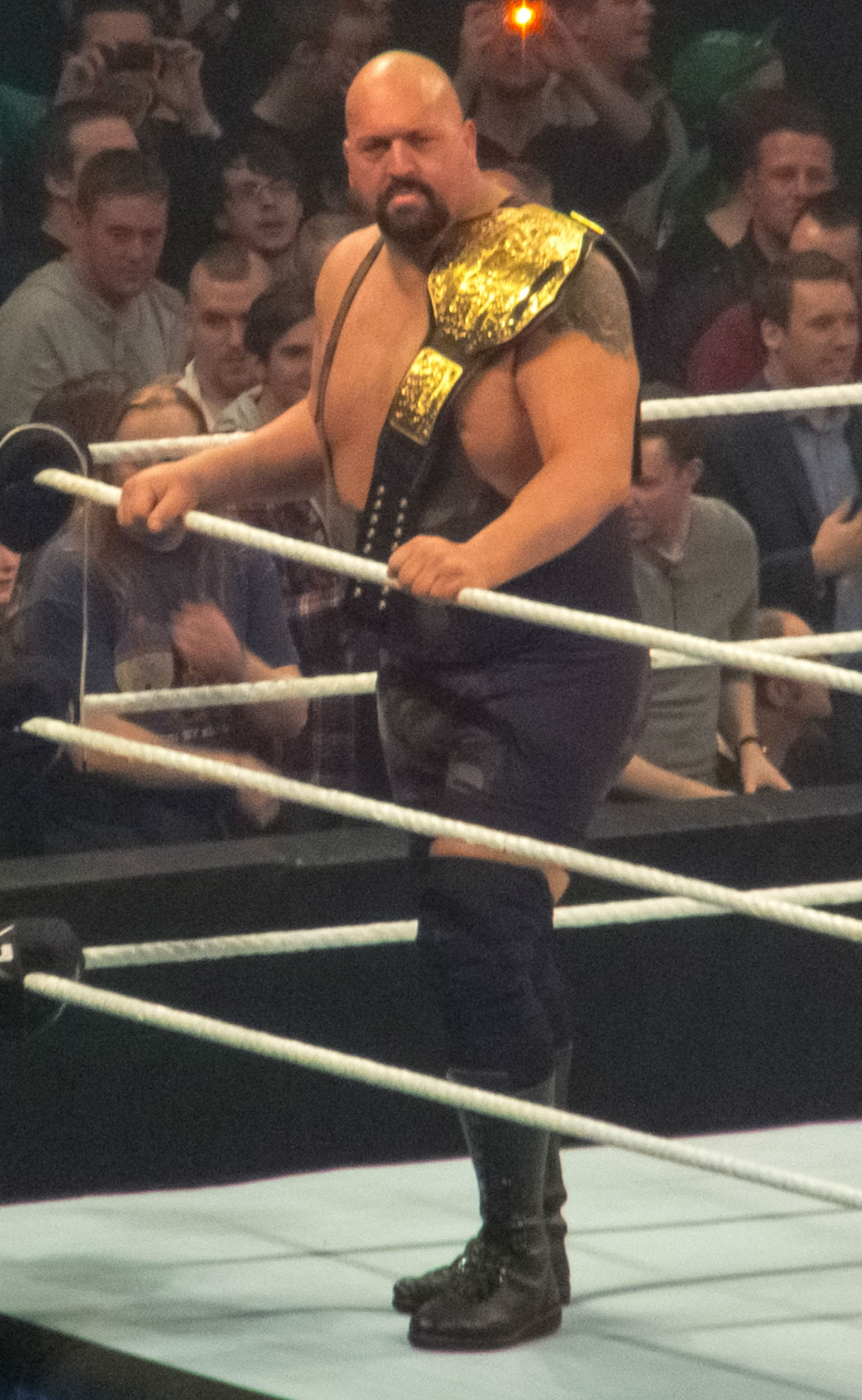
Big Show is a two-time World Heavyweight Champion...

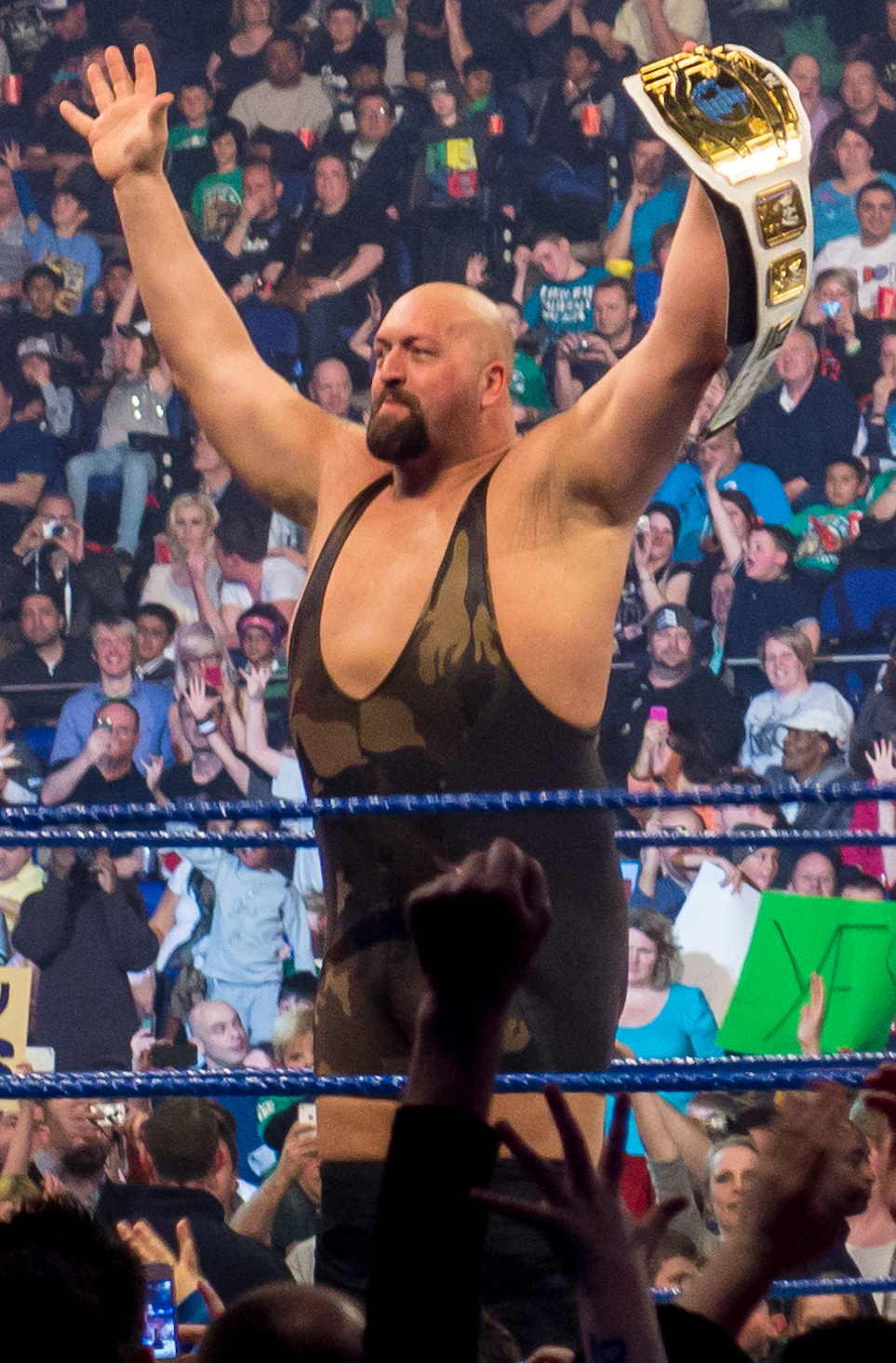
...a former Intercontinental Champion...

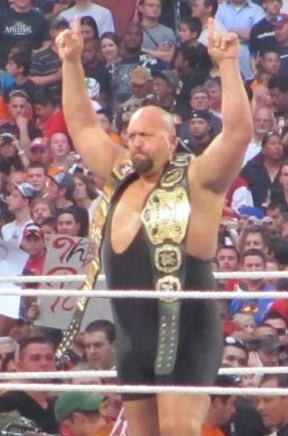
...and an eight-time world tag team champion in WWE – factoring in both WWE Tag Team Championship (around right shoulder) and World Tag Team Championship (left shoulder) reigns.

- Pro Wrestling Illustrated
  - Rookie of the Year (1996)
  - Wrestler of the Year (1996)
  - Ranked No. 2 of the top 500 singles wrestlers of the year in the PWI 500 in 1996
  - Ranked No. 137 of the top 500 singles wrestlers of the PWI Years in 2003
- World Championship Wrestling
  - WCW World Heavyweight Championship (2 times)
  - WCW World Tag Team Championship (3 times) – with Lex Luger (1), Sting (1), and Scott Hall (1)
  - World War 3 (1996)
- World Wrestling Federation/World Wrestling Entertainment/WWE
  - WWF/E Championship (2 times)
  - World Heavyweight Championship (2 times)
  - ECW World Heavyweight Championship (1 time)
  - WWE Intercontinental Championship (1 time)
  - WWE United States Championship (1 time)
  - WWF/E Hardcore Championship (3 times)
  - WWE Tag Team Championship (3 times) – with Chris Jericho (1), The Miz (1), and Kane (1)
  - WWF/World Tag Team Championship (5 times) – with The Undertaker (2), Kane (1), Chris Jericho (1), and The Miz (1)
  - Brisbane Cup (2010)
  - André the Giant Memorial Trophy (2015)
  - Bragging Rights Trophy (2010) – With Team SmackDown (with Alberto Del Rio, Edge, Jack Swagger, Kofi Kingston, Rey Mysterio, and Tyler Reks)
  - 24th Triple Crown Champion
  - 12th Grand Slam Champion
  - Slammy Award (5 times)
    - Tag Team of the Year (2009) – with Chris Jericho
    - Holy $#!+ Move of the Year (2011) – Imploding the Ring after being superplexed by Mark Henry at Vengeance
    - Betrayal of the Year (2012) – Knocking out John Cena at Over the Limit
    - "This is Awesome" Moment of the Year (2013) – Knocking out Triple H on Raw
    - Match of the Year (2014) – Team Cena vs. Team Authority at Survivor Series
- Wrestling Observer Newsletter
  - Most Embarrassing Wrestler (2002)
  - Rookie of the Year (1996)
  - Best Gimmick (1996) – nWo
  - Feud of the Year (1996) New World Order vs. World Championship Wrestling
  - Worst Feud of the Year (1999) vs. The Big Boss Man
  - Worst Feud of the Year (2013) vs. The Authority
  - Worst Wrestler (2001, 2002)

== Awards and nominations ==
Year	Award	Category	Work	Result
2020	East Europe International Film Festival	Best Supporting Actor	Marcus	Nominated
2021	Idyllwild International Festival of Cinema	Best Supporting Actor in a feature film	Marcus	Nominated
2021	North Europe International Film Festival	Best Supporting Actor	Marcus	Nominated

== Bibliography ==
- Meltzer, Dave (January 27, 2014). "Jan 27 2014 Wrestling Observer Newsletter: 2013 Annual awards issue, best in the world in numerous categories, plus all the news in pro-wrestling and MMA over the past week and more". Wrestling Observer Newsletter. Campbell, California. ISSN 1083-9593.
- Krugman, Michael (2009). Andre the Giant – A Legendary Life. WWE. ISBN 9781439188132.
