= Katie A. Keane =

American actress

- Born: Katie Amanda Keane; Topeka, Kansas, U.S.
- Occupation: Actress
- Years active: 2005–present

Katie A. Keane (also known as Katie Amanda Keane) is an American actress.

== Career ==
Keane received her Bachelor of Fine Arts from Emporia State University in 1996 and a M.F.A. with honors from California State University, Long Beach. In addition to a number of theatrical credits (including performances as Lady Macbeth and Desdemona), she is best known for her role as Audie Gallagher in the television series Ruby & the Rockits. She has also had guest appearances on Passions, Strong Medicine, CSI: NY, How I Met Your Mother, NCIS, Without a Trace, and Eli Stone. She portrays Sarah in the 2010 film My Name Is Khan.

== Filmography ==
Film roles
Year	Title	Role	Notes
2005	Hell to Pay	Rachel	
2007	Protecting the King	Barbara	
2008	The Pitch	Lucy	Short film
2009	Victims of Love	Kathryn Love	Short film
2009	Alexa Vega: You Are Where I Live		Short film
2010	My Name Is Khan	Sarah Garrick	
2010	Hysteria	Kate	
2012	The Hunger Pains	Effu Poorpeople	Short film
2014	Lizard King	Helen	Short film

Television roles
Year	Title	Role	Notes
2005	Passions	Waitress	2 episodes
2005	Strong Medicine	Attractive Doctor	Episode: "Family Practice"
2005	How I Met Your Mother	Stripper	Episode: "Belly Full of Turkey"
2006	CSI: NY	Dr. Rachel Jeffries	Episode: "Wasted"
2006	NCIS	Laurie Niles	Episode: "Witch Hunt"
2006	The Way	Brooke	TV movie
2007	Without a Trace	Meg Pruitt	Episode: "Crash and Burn"
2007	Prison Break	Sara Tancredi	Episode: "Call Waiting"
2007	Shark	Meg Fullerton	Episode: "In Absentia"
2008	Eli Stone	Jane Halston	2 episode
2009	Ruby & the Rockits	Audie Gallagher	Main cast
2010	Notes from the Underbelly	Amy	Episode: "The Weekend"
2010	Alabama	Mr. Magenta	TV Pilot
2011	Rizzoli & Isles	Mrs. Payson	Episode: "Living Proof"
2011–2013	We're Alive	Amy	2 episodes
2012	Sketchy	Pregnant Guitar Mom	Episode: "Make a Baby"
2012	Sketchy	Lead Momney	Episode: "Romney Has It"
2012–2014	See Dad Run	Gwen	3 episodes
2014	Back in the Game	Dr. Jane	Episode: "Sports Therapy"
2015	The Exes	Janet	Episode: "The 40-Year-Old Her-Gin"
2015	Parental Indiscretion	Doctor	3 episodes
2015–2017	Major Crimes	Ms. Ziskin	2 episodes
2017	Rebel	Dr. Jennifer Delge	2 episodes
2018	Agents of S.H.I.E.L.D.	Deke's Mom	Episode: "Principia"
2018	Criminal Minds	Mary Wright	Episode: "Broken Wing"
