= Ruby & the Rockits =

- The main characters of Ruby & the Rockits (from left to right), David, Ruby, Jordan, Patrick, Audie and Ben.
- Genre: Sitcom
- Created by: Shaun Cassidy; Ed Yeager
- Developed by: Shaun Cassidy
- Starring: Alexa Vega; Patrick Cassidy; Katie Amanda Keane; Austin Butler; Kurt Doss; David Cassidy
- Theme music composer: Shaun Cassidy
- Opening theme: "You Are Where I Live" by Alexa Vega
- Composer: Jay Gruska
- Country of origin: United States
- Original language: English
- No. of seasons: 1
- No. of episodes: 10

Production
- Executive producers: Shaun Cassidy; Marsh McCall
- Running time: 23 minutes
- Production companies: Shaun Cassidy Productions; ABC Studios

Original release
- Network: ABC Family
- Release: July 21 – September 22, 2009

Ruby & the Rockits is an American comedy series executive produced by Shaun Cassidy and Marsh McCall. The series premiered on Tuesday, July 21, 2009.

The series was created by Shaun Cassidy, the creator of American Gothic and Invasion, brother of cast member Patrick Cassidy, and half-brother of the show's star David Cassidy. Their youngest brother Ryan Cassidy worked on the show in a behind-the-scenes capacity.

== Premise ==
Ruby & the Rockits follows Patrick Gallagher, a former teen icon, who has chosen to lead a quiet life with his wife Audie (herself an ex-1980s music video dancer) and two sons. But when his former Rockits bandmate and brother, David, shows up unexpectedly with his new-found teenage daughter in tow, the Gallagher family's life becomes anything but normal. David, who refuses to give up his past glory days, comes to Patrick for help raising Ruby while he continues to perform. Patrick must now put the past with David behind them in order to help raise Ruby and keep order within the rest of the Gallagher clan.

== Production ==
Ruby & the Rockits was written by former teen idol Shaun Cassidy and Ed Yeager, with teleplay by Ed Yeager and Marsh McCall. Former teen idol David Cassidy, his brother Patrick Cassidy, Katie A. Keane, Alexa Vega, and Austin Butler star in the series.

On February 2, 2009, ABC Family announced it had ordered a full season of ten episodes, and the series premiere was watched by 1.6 million viewers. However, due to low ratings, the show was canceled at the end of the season.

== Cast and characters ==
- Alexa Vega as Ruby Gallagher
- Patrick Cassidy as Patrick Gallagher, Ruby's paternal uncle
- Katie Amanda Keane as Audie Gallagher, Ruby's paternal aunt
- Austin Butler as Jordan Gallagher, Ruby's paternal cousin
- Kurt Doss as Ben Gallagher, Ruby's paternal cousin
- David Cassidy as David Gallagher, Ruby's father

== Critical reception ==
Ruby & the Rockits received a score of 60 out of 100 from review aggregator Metacritic. Reviews were mixed but generally favorable. Robert Lloyd, from the Los Angeles Times, stated in his review that the show "feels surprisingly ordinary and uninformed, put together out of scraps from the old sitcom drawer." In a review in the New York Daily News, David Hinckley also noted the feeling of a 1950s sitcom but, in contrast, said this "isn't totally a bad thing." Hinckley adds that despite the jokes of rock star life, the show "keeps it all remarkably clean and wholesome." Another reviewer says "it's simple enough for the kids and entertaining enough for the adults."

A review in the Boston Globe stated that Ruby & the Rockits has no right to be as likable as it is, and called the show "a warm intergenerational comedy that never pushes life lessons in your face." Similarly, The Hollywood Reporter's Randee Dawn noted the "same unicorn-and-rainbows flavor Disney has been shilling out for years", but adds that this "makes it practically perfect in every way." In a review for Variety, Brian Lowry called the show "borderline ridiculous" and stated that "there's nothing much to recommend." Furthermore, the Los Angeles Times review said that it was "not especially good."

== Episodes ==
No.	Title	Directed by	Written by	Original release date
1	"Pilot"	Ted Wass	Story by : Shaun Cassidy & Ed Yeager; Teleplay by : Marsh McCall & Ed Yeager	July 21, 2009
In the series opener, teenage Ruby (Alexa Vega) reconnects with her dad, David (David Cassidy) a pop star whose heyday was in the 1980s. David then seeks out his estranged brother and former bandmate, Patrick (Patrick Cassidy) who's now a suburban dad from whom David needs helps. Songs Featured: "Lost in Your Own Life" (studio version) by Ruby, "Lost in Your Own Life" (acoustic version) by Jordan and "Only a Dream Lasts Forever" by The Rockits.
2	"Save the Last Dunce for Me"	Asaad Kelada	Shaun Cassidy & Marsh McCall	July 28, 2009
David is a no-show at the father-daughter dance that Ruby helped organize at school. Title's Song Reference: "Save the Last Dance for Me" by Ben E. King and The Drifters Songs Featured: "The Way It's Gonna Be" by Ruby and "Chunnel of Love" by The Rockits
3	"Do You Want Me to Blow a Secret?"	Ted Wass	Larry Reitzer	August 4, 2009
Jordan asks Ruby for a ride home from a keg party, but the only vehicle available is Patrick's new car, which Ruby is not allowed to drive. She decides that it is more important to help Jordan than to listen to the rules. The next morning Patrick is upset because he thinks David drove his car, due to alcohol smell and the drivers seat is meant to fit a person in a smaller size. Ruby convinces David to take the blame for Jordan and her. He apologizes to Patrick, and Patrick forgives him. Later, they watch David's interview. Upon describing Ruby, he says she's a rebel, and a crazy person just like he was/is. He then proceeds to go into detail of how she stole his brothers car and saved her drunk cousin. Patrick ends up grounding Jordan for three weeks, Ruby for one. Guest Star: Arden Myrin as Erica Title's Song Reference: "Do You Want to Know a Secret" by The Beatles Songs Featured: "Forever Your Song" by Ruby
4	"It's My Party and I'll Lie If I Want To"	Asaad Kelada	Lesley Wake	August 11, 2009
Ruby throws a party to impress some new classmates, but David throws a bash that outshines hers. Elsewhere, Patrick and Audie embark on a weekend getaway, but end up mad at each other when they share a secret. Audie's secret is that she had kissed David before Patrick, thus making Patrick mad. When he gets over it, she asks what his secret might be, and it is implied that he had kissed one of her cousins at a Christmas party. Guest Star: Khalil Kain as Crayton Jones Title's Song Reference: "It's My Party" by Lesley Gore Songs Featured: "Too High a Price" by Ruby and "Let's Make Love" by David
5	"Papas Don't Preach"	Leonard R. Garner, Jr.	Hugh Webber	August 18, 2009
Ruby wants to date an older guy, and David and Patrick have opposing views on the matter. David then sneaks Ruby out through her bedroom window. While on her date Jordan shows up and he and Ruby's date start to argue, but it is then revealed that her date is gay and didn't think it was a date in the first place. Guest Star: Jake Sandvig as Nils Title's Song Reference: "Papa Don't Preach" by Madonna Songs Featured: "Possibilities" by Ruby and Jordan
6	"Hot for Spanish Teacher"	Millicent Shelton	Julie Ann Larson	August 25, 2009
Ruby's not pleased when David goes out with her Spanish teacher. Meanwhile, Jordan and Ben earn some cash by serving as tour guides for Rockits fans. Guest Star: Alex Meneses as Vanessa Vasquez Title's Song Reference: "Hot for Teacher" by Van Halen Songs Featured: "Forever Your Song" (instrumental)
7	"We Are Family?"	Steve Zuckerman	Kirk J. Rudell	September 1, 2009
David invites a magazine reporter to accompany him and Ruby on a day they spend bonding. Elsewhere, Jordan wants to know if Ruby is indeed David's offspring, so he tries to obtain DNA samples from them. Guest Star: Alan Ruck as Martin Title's Song Reference: "We Are Family" by Sister Sledge Songs Featured: "When I Close My Eyes" by Ruby
8	"We Aren't the Champions"	Leonard R. Garner, Jr.	Lesley Wake	September 8, 2009
Patrick becomes the coach of Ruby's soccer team, while David takes a creative approach to mentoring Jordan in songwriting. Title's Song Reference: "We Are the Champions" by Queen Songs Featured: "Life I Love You, Not" by Jordan and "Humming Medley" by the Cast
9	"50 Ways to Heave Your Mother"	Fred Savage	Marsh McCall	September 15, 2009
Ruby meets David and Patrick's mother (Shirley Jones) who's unreceptive to Ruby's attempts at bonding and asks Ruby not to call her "Grandma". Title's Song Reference: "50 Ways to Leave Your Lover" by Paul Simon
10	"Smells Like Teen Drama"	Leonard R. Garner, Jr.	Karen DiConcetto & Rochelle Zimmerman	September 22, 2009
Ruby gets mad at Jordan when he starts dating her best friend Kristen (Lucy Hale) meanwhile, David and Patrick teach Ben how to defend himself against a bully at school, the dad and the uncle lie, and teach Ben how to fight the bully, he ends up winning. It turns out the bully is a girl. Title's Song Reference: "Smells Like Teen Spirit" by Nirvana

== Music ==
Each week a song in promotion of an episode was released onto the iTunes Store. All songs were performed by Alexa Vega, except where noted.

1. "Lost in Your Own Life" (released on June 30, 2009)
2. "You are Where I Live" (released on July 21, 2009)
3. "The Way It's Gonna Be" (released on July 28, 2009)
4. "Forever Your Song" (released on August 4, 2009)
5. "Too High a Price" (released on August 11, 2009)
6. "Possibilities" (performed by Alexa Vega & Austin Butler) (released on August 18, 2009)
7. "Life, I Love You Not" (performed by Austin Butler) (released on September 1, 2009)
8. "When I Close My Eyes" (released on September 9, 2009)
