= Protecting the King =

- Directed by: D. Edward Stanley
- Written by: D. Edward Stanley; Marty Poole; G. Dean Daniels
- Produced by: Scott Vandiver
- Cinematography: Philip Lee
- Edited by: Joe Pascual
- Music by: Joe Cruz
- Release date: 2007
- Country: United States
- Language: English

Protecting the King is a 2007 American drama film starring Peter Dobson as Elvis Presley. Rereleased June 2022, the film may be rented for streaming at the official webpage of the film. It tells the real life story of David Stanley (Matt Barr), the stepbrother and bodyguard of Elvis.

In June 1972, The King Of Rock & Roll, Elvis Presley, invites his sixteen-year-old stepbrother David Stanley to drop out of school and join his personal entourage. David eagerly accepts and embarks on an eye-opening journey that’s every teenager's Rock & Roll fantasy. A boy in a man's world, David quickly becomes a bodyguard, caretaker, and fixer. He finds himself struggling to do whatever is necessary to shield the image of his beloved brother while dealing with the demons of his own personal life.

== Cast ==
- Peter Dobson as Elvis Presley
- Matt Barr as David Stanley
- Tom Sizemore as Ronnie
- Dey Young as Dee
- Max Perlich as Daryl
- Mark Rolston as Frank
- John Bennett Perry as Vernon Presley
- Brian Krause as Jeff
- Katie A. Keane as Barbara
- Danielle Keaton as Katie
- Robert R. Shafer as Officer Gibbs
- Larry Tatum as Ed Parker
