= WWF No Mercy (video game) =

2000 professional wrestling video game

- North American cover art featuring Jeff Hardy, Edge, The Rock and Triple H
- Developers: Asmik Ace Entertainment; AKI Corporation
- Publisher: THQ
- Director: Hideyuki Iwashita
- Designer: Kenji Kimura
- Programmer: Kudou Masaaki
- Composer: Kouji Niikura
- Platform: Nintendo 64
- Release: NA: November 14, 2000; EU: December 15, 2000
- Genres: Fighting; Sports
- Modes: Single player, multiplayer

WWF No Mercy is a professional wrestling video game released in 2000 by THQ for the Nintendo 64. It is based on the World Wrestling Federation (WWF, now WWE) and is named after the WWF's annual event of the same name. Developed by Asmik Ace Entertainment and AKI Corporation, No Mercy is the last in a series of Nintendo 64 wrestling games from the companies that started with WCW vs. nWo: World Tour.

No Mercy features various improvements over its predecessor, 1999's WWF WrestleMania 2000, such as improved graphics, a "Championship" mode that allows players to participate in various branching storylines, and a more in-depth character creation mode. The improvements made to the game, combined with the series' vaunted gameplay and controls garnered praise from critics upon release. Nevertheless, the game was faulted by some for its blocky graphics, slowdown and the difficulty level of computer-controlled opponents. Overall, the game was critically well received and would become one of the best-selling titles for the Nintendo 64, as well as the third-best-selling wrestling game for the Nintendo 64 console.

In the years since its release, No Mercy has been regarded as the best wrestling video game ever made, as well as one of the standout titles for the Nintendo 64. The game has maintained a strong, loyal fanbase throughout the years and various unofficial modifications for the game have been developed, altering/updating the game's graphics and sounds and introducing different playable wrestlers to the game's roster.

== Gameplay ==
Jeff Hardy performs a swanton bomb on Bubba Ray Dudley in the game's new ladder match.

No Mercy features the same game mechanics as its predecessors. Players can strike or grapple with their opponent; combining a button press with a direction yields different strikes and grappling maneuvers. The momentum system from the previous games has also been retained, where players build up their "Attitude" meter by attacking their opponent. Having a large amount of momentum increases the player's chances of a successful pinfall or submission, and filling up the meter completely allows the player to execute their character's finishing maneuver.

Additional characters and arenas, as well as moves and costumes to be used in the game's create-a-wrestler mode can be unlocked in the new "Smackdown Mall". Players earn in-game currency through gameplay that they can spend to unlock these in-game items. One way players can earn currency is through the game's new single-player Championship Mode, which tasks players with winning one of the WWF's various championship titles. There are seven selectable story paths to play through, one for each of the available championships. Each storyline features branching paths that are reached depending on players' decisions made during the story or whether they win or lose certain matches. In-game currency can also be earned by playing the game's survival mode, in which players attempt to defeat as many opponents as possible without being defeated themselves. Players can compete in various match types in Exhibition modes, including the newly added ladder match. As in the previous Nintendo 64 titles, up to four players can compete in the same match. The game also features new arenas to wrestle in, as well as introducing backstage areas in which players can brawl using various weapons and objects in the environment. This would be the first and subsequently only game in the AKI series which allowed players to fight backstage.

In addition to the game's over sixty playable characters, players can also create their own characters using the game's create-a-wrestler mode. No Mercy features much more extensive character creation options than its predecessors with more moves, more customizable body attributes and the ability to create female wrestlers. Ring attire, entrances, moves, allies and rivals, and other wrestler attributes can also be customized. Up to 18 original wrestlers can be saved. Much like its predecessors, in addition to creating their own wrestlers, players can also freely edit the in-game roster as well.

== Development ==
The game was first announced in early 2000. A playable demo version was exhibited at that year's E3 event, showcasing various playable wrestlers and the arena for the WWF's SmackDown! show. A companion title for the handheld Game Boy Color was also announced, which would allow players to utilize the Transfer Pak to import points earned in the portable game to spend on rewards in the Nintendo 64 version's SmackDown Mall, as well as featuring a special storyline path that players could play through in Championship Mode. However, the companion handheld game was cancelled and the Transfer Pak features were subsequently dropped from the Nintendo 64 version.

Soon after release, an issue with the initial line of game cartridges was reported in which players' save data could and would inexplicably be erased at any time. Initially, THQ recommended that players reset their cartridge to factory defaults to fix the issue. When players still reported issues, the company eventually instituted a recall program where those affected by the glitch would be able to exchange their copy of the game for a fixed one. Due to the fixed copies only being available through the exchange program, these cartridges are exceedingly rare and are often sold for hundreds of dollars. The second European version also removed visible blood.

== Reception ==
Reception

Aggregate score
Aggregator	Score
Metacritic	89/100

Review scores
Publication	Score
CNET Gamecenter	8/10
Electronic Gaming Monthly	8.17/10 (Note: In Electronic Gaming Monthly's review of the game, two critics gave it each a score of 8.5/10, and the other gave it 7.5/10.)
EP Daily	8/10
Game Informer	9.5/10
GameRevolution	B+
GameSpot	7.7/10
IGN	9/10
N64 Magazine	92%
Next Generation	4/5
Nintendo Power	7.3/10
X-Play	4/5

Critics lauded the title's gameplay and simple controls. GameSpot praised the wide variety of moves, including each characters' finishing moves, as well the ease with which the maneuvers could be executed. Reviewer Frank Provo wrote that "(e)xecuting these and other moves is as simple as tapping A to grapple and then performing a short directional pad and button combination". Similarly, a reviewer for GamePro opined about "(l)earning the controls is as simple as a rake to the eyes" (Note: GamePro gave the game 4.5/5 for graphics, 4/5 for sound, and two 5/5 scores for control and fun factor.) and IGN called the controls "easy to use". Greg Orlando of NextGen called it "a 3D wrasslefest that eschews mercy as much as it embraces excellence."

The game's improvements over WrestleMania 2000 were also well received, with publications such as GamePro and GameRevolution calling No Mercy a "revamp" and "upgrade" over its predecessor. Frank Provo of GameSpot and Al Paterson of X-Play cited the Smackdown Mall and additional character creation options as highlights. Electronic Gaming Monthly also praised the game's improvements, commenting that while WrestleMania 2000 was not much of an improvement over WCW/nWo Revenge before it, No Mercy "looks and plays like a proper follow-up". The game's Championship Mode was hailed as an improvement over the previous game. Writing for IGN, Blake Norton praised the branching paths of the Championship Mode, writing that it would have players "coming back for weeks and weeks, to try each belt, try each twist, try each new plot development, then do it again with different wrestlers". Despite this, the mode was criticized for its writing, with a reviewer in GameRevolution commenting it was "not even close to being as good as WWF writing" and EGM mentioning that "story lines could be deeper".

Reviewers also highlighted the game's technical shortcomings. IGN, GameSpot and Game Informer pointed out that the game would noticeably slow down with four wrestlers on screen. Publications such as GamePro also pointed out that while the graphics had improved since the last game, they were still blocky. GameRevolution's reviewer wrote that "its superiority over Wrestlemania 2000 is marginalized due to technical limitations". The game's AI was also criticized, with both IGN and Game Informer mentioning the propensity of computer-controlled opponents to start reversing every maneuver. Jennifer Villereal of Nintendo Power commented that the game takes "little skill to play". Despite these faults, the game received "generally favorable reviews" according to video game review aggregator Metacritic. In 2009, Official Nintendo Magazine placed the game 70th on a list of greatest Nintendo games, praising the "deep and tactical gameplay".

The game was also a commercial success, selling over 1 million units, making it the third best-selling wrestling game for the N64.

WWF No Mercy received nominations in the Console Fighting, Console Game of the Year and Game of the Year categories at the 4th Annual Interactive Achievement Awards, which were ultimately awarded to Dead or Alive 2, SSX, and Diablo II, respectively. It was also nominated for the "Best Console Fighting Game", "N64 Game of the Year", and "Gamers' Choice N64" awards at The Electric Playground's Blister Awards 2000, which went to Ultimate Fighting Championship and Perfect Dark (the latter two awards), respectively.

== Legacy ==
"To this day, I still hear, 'Why can't you make the new WWE games like No Mercy,' and I don't think I'm ever going to stop hearing that. It's 13 years old and we still get compared to No Mercy – how we compare to No Mercy's game play, and how they want us to bring back No Mercy on Xbox Live".

— Cory Ledesma, then-creative director of WWE Games, in 2013

No Mercy was the last wrestling game to be developed by Asmik Ace and AKI for the Nintendo 64. EA's Def Jam Vendetta and Def Jam: Fight for NY, both developed by AKI, have been considered spiritual successors by fans. No Mercy has been cited as one of the best wrestling games ever made and the standard by which newer wrestling games are compared. Rus Mclaughlin of IGN wrote that the title helped AKI "seal their hold on the new benchmark of wrestling games". In 2016, Jeremy Peeples of Hardcore Gamer opined that the variety of wrestling maneuvers in the game still held up and in some cases surpassed more modern wrestling titles such as WWE 2K16. Mark Bozon, also writing for IGN, commented that "the No Mercy era brought the first truly deep wrestling experience to many gamers" and that "there's truly no better American wrestling game in history, as No Mercy is still regarded as the most balanced and true-to-life fighter in the business".

Despite its age and the release of newer wrestling titles, No Mercy retains a strong cult following of players who favor it over more recent wrestling games. Various fan modifications of the game have been made, introducing new arenas, new wrestlers and/or other wrestling promotions to the game and is popularly used in emulators.

In 2020, the director of WWF No Mercy, Hideyuki Iwashita (credited in the game as "Geta"), signed on as a consultant for a wrestling game developed by Yuke's based on All Elite Wrestling (AEW), called AEW Fight Forever. The game was released on June 29, 2023, by THQ Nordic, with the game taking heavy inspiration from No Mercy.

Later in 2023, WWE's developmental brand, NXT, held a premium live event called NXT No Mercy on September 30. A day before the event, WWE released the cold open online ahead of the show which paid tribute to the No Mercy video game.

== See also ==
- Virtual Pro Wrestling
