= Virtual Pro Wrestling 64 =

1997 video game

- Official box art of Virtual Pro Wrestling 64
- Developers: Asmik Ace Entertainment; AKI Corporation
- Publisher: Asmik Ace Entertainment
- Series: Virtual Pro Wrestling
- Platform: Nintendo 64
- Release: JP: December 19, 1997
- Genre: Wrestling
- Modes: Single-player, multiplayer

Virtual Pro Wrestling 64 (VPW 64) is a professional wrestling video game released in 1997 on the Nintendo 64 and the second game in the Virtual Pro Wrestling series. The game is a sequel to the original Virtual Pro Wrestling released in 1996 exclusively for the PlayStation. The game was only released in Japan, and is the Japanese counterpart to WCW vs. nWo: World Tour. The game features wrestlers from World Championship Wrestling, but also includes generic renditions of wrestlers from major Japanese promotions such as New Japan Pro-Wrestling and All Japan Pro Wrestling, a feature that would continue following the release of its January 2000 sequel Virtual Pro Wrestling 2: Ōdō Keishō.

== Differences from WCW vs. nWo: World Tour ==
Although released less than a month after its American counterpart, Virtual Pro Wrestling 64 has various distinctions from and additions to WCW vs. nWo: World Tour. For example, most wrestlers sport their actual attires but occasionally they may contain color alterations as is the case with Hulk Hogan's famous yellow tights and red knee pads which are replaced with yellow tights and black knee pads and with Chris Benoit, who sports his Japanese attires as opposed to his Four Horsemen attire which he wears in World Tour. Along with other sporadic attire color coordination changes, some wrestler's actual movesets are sometimes altered as well. For instance, with Chris Benoit's Front Special move, he performs a double German suplex which is entirely absent from World Tour and Diamond Dallas Page, who needs not be unlocked as required World Tour (along with Randy Savage), performs his signature Diamond Cutter simply as a strong grapple move and instead has a gutwrench spinning powerbomb for his front Special. Other unlockable wrestlers in World Tour that are entirely absent from VPW 64, include Glacier and Wrath.

Notably, VPW 64 also includes a post-match scoring system as well as the ability to edit wrestlers' attire. These features would not be introduced to American gamers until WCW/nWo Revenge in 1998.

== See also ==
- WCW vs. nWo: World Tour
- Virtual Pro Wrestling 2: Ōdō Keishō
- Virtual Pro-Wrestling (PlayStation)
