= AEW Fight Forever =

2023 professional wrestling video game

- Cover art featuring various AEW wrestlers
- Developer: Yuke's
- Publisher: THQ Nordic
- Director: Hideyuki "Geta" Iwashita
- Designers: Osamu Hashimoto; Takuro Yamamori
- Programmers: Arata Toki; Fumio Yurugi; Kazuma Fuchimoto; Koichi Sato; Takuya Okubo
- Artist: Ari Sawada
- Composers: Chan Kean Yi; Momo Michishita; Kotaro Tamura
- Engine: Unreal Engine 4
- Platforms: Nintendo Switch; PlayStation 4; PlayStation 5; Windows; Xbox One; Xbox Series X/S
- Release: June 29, 2023
- Genre: Sports
- Modes: Single-player, multiplayer

AEW Fight Forever (Note: Japanese: AEWファイト・フォーエバー, Hepburn: AEW faito fōebā) is a 2023 professional wrestling sports video game developed by Yuke's and published by THQ Nordic. It is the debut title on home consoles and personal computers based on the American professional wrestling promotion All Elite Wrestling (AEW).

Plans of a game for the promotion were reported as early as October 2019 and officially announced in November 2020, with the game being the first wrestling game developed by Yuke's since 2018 with WWE 2K19, before the studio ended its working relationship with WWE and 2K in August 2019. The game is heavily inspired by previous console generations of wrestling games, particularly WWF No Mercy for the Nintendo 64, with an arcade-style of gameplay with exaggerated wrestler appearances and presentation, as opposed to a more realistic simulation style of the developer's most recent previous wrestling games.

The game was released on June 29, 2023, for Nintendo Switch, PlayStation 4, PlayStation 5, Windows, Xbox One, and Xbox Series X/S. It received mixed reviews, being praised for its throwback style of arcade gameplay but criticized for its limited presentation, modes, and customization.

== Gameplay ==
Fight Forever features arcade-style gameplay, with different match types including singles match, tag team match, ladder match, Casino Battle Royale, and Exploding Barbed Wire Deathmatch. The game also features online play and intergender wrestling, the first Yuke's game since WWE SmackDown vs. Raw 2009 to do so. During November 10, 2020, at the AEW Games 1.0 Special Event, Kenny Omega confirmed that the game would be a spiritual successor to games like WWF No Mercy and Virtual Pro Wrestling, with gameplay in the style and veins as the AKI engine that ran those games.

A career mode entitled "Road to Elite" allows players to take a member of the AEW roster or their own created wrestler through the AEW schedule spanning across four blocks, taking place throughout 2019 and 2020, with each block corresponding to each of the four major AEW pay-per-view events: All Out, Full Gear, Revolution and Double or Nothing, with three storylines per block, for a total of sixteen storylines. Each block has four weeks, with the first three weeks taking place on AEW Dynamite and the fourth week being a PPV event. During each week, the chosen wrestler has four turns, simulating a daily life of an AEW wrestler, with an option to take on optional matches taking place on AEW Dark and AEW Rampage, as well as facing off against Kenny Omega (as a partner in 2v2 mini-games) and/or The Young Bucks (Nick and Matt Jackson) in mini-games. Video packages chronicle the history of AEW, with the story beginning with Double or Nothing in 2019, placing the male player character in the Casino Battle Royale for a spot in the inaugural AEW World Championship match or the female player character in a Fatal-4-Way Match for a spot in the inaugural AEW Women's World Championship match at All Out. The story changes as a result of matches won or lost, and other player choices. Character upgrades are carried through to the rest of the game, with players encouraged to play through the mode multiple times with different wrestlers.

An in-game shop allows players to use currency earned through completing challenges to unlock creation suite parts (including entrance motions inspired by NJPW and WWE stars), alternative attires and unlockable wrestlers. Additional minigames and an "Elite" difficulty were originally unlockables in the shop, but these were available to all players. The game features a full creation suite, including wrestlers, entrances, teams and arenas. Players can change camera angles, use visual effects and set off pyrotechnics and various special effects during entrances. Fight Forever also features fifteen mini-games in the base game, with four additional mini-games being made available as DLC.

== Development ==
=== Pre-release ===
Several members of AEW management expressed interest in an AEW video game ahead of AEW Dynamite's debut episode in October 2019. The game was officially announced on November 10, 2020, at the AEW Games 1.0 Special Event. Yuke's was announced as the developer, having previously worked on multiple games for both New Japan Pro-Wrestling and WWE, as well as Rumble Roses for Konami. It would be their first wrestling game since WWE 2K19 in 2018. The reveal trailer featured AEW wrestlers Kenny Omega, Chris Jericho, and Hikaru Shida. Hideyuki "Geta" Iwashita, director of WWF No Mercy and WCW/nWo Revenge, was also announced as the director.

Later that month, Hiromi Furuta, senior producer at Yuke's, stated that WWF No Mercy was a key influence due to its popularity with fans of the genre, and that Fight Forever was not intended to rival the WWE 2K series. In June 2021, the first in-development gameplay video was released, including the reveal of Darby Allin. In September, another short gameplay video featuring Jungle Boy was released. On September 20, 2021, AEW announced a partnership with the Owen Hart Foundation to preserve the legacy of Owen Hart, which included an appearance in the forthcoming console game. This would mark Hart's first appearance in a video game since 2004 in Showdown: Legends of Wrestling, which was released by Acclaim. In February 2022, Kenny Omega stated that the game would feature cross-platform play. However, only cross-generation play was available at launch, with PS4 players able to connect with PS5 players, and Xbox One players being to interact with Xbox Series X/S players.

Following the April 21, 2022 taping of AEW Dynamite, AEW founder Tony Khan told the live crowd that the title of the game would be AEW: Fight Forever. This was formally announced on May 4, 2022, with the release of gameplay videos featuring Kris Statlander and Nyla Rose. In June 2022, Omega stated in an interview with Fightful that the game was tentatively scheduled to release later that year. Omega later confirmed that the game would be published by THQ Nordic. In December 2022, Evil Uno revealed to Fightful that the game would launch with over 50 playable characters, with new roster members and game modes being added as downloadable content over time, likening it to No Man's Sky.

Despite his departure from AEW in February 2022 and subsequent return to the WWE at WrestleMania 38, former executive vice-president Cody Rhodes remained part of the base roster as an unlockable wrestler in Fight Forever. When asked about Rhodes' presence in the game, Kenny Omega responded that he was "very passionate about making sure [Rhodes'] legacy and position within the company were preserved," and that "you get to experience AEW from the beginning, from day one," referencing Rhodes' involvement in the formation of AEW. As a result, Rhodes became the first wrestler in 24 years to appear in two professional wrestling games released by rival promotions within the same calendar year, having been playable in WWE 2K23 which was released 3 months prior to Fight Forever.

Tony Khan said in June 2021 that he put forth an eight-figure investment in AEW's games division. Journalist Dave Meltzer reported the budget for Fight Forever itself exceeded $10 million as of June 2022. Other reports during this time stated that development costs exceeded the game's planned budget, causing conflict between Yuke's development staff and AEW management.

On June 22, 2023, AEW Senior Vice President Nik Sobic stated in an interview with SEScoops that the decision was made early on to hand-animate the moves instead of using motion capture technology. He also mentioned that if the team had unlimited time, the game would have featured full rosters from both AEW and NJPW, adding that if Fight Forever performed well and the fans requested it, there would be opportunities for crossover updates in the future. In the same interview, THQ Nordic producer David Knudsen pushed back on rumors that blood was removed due to issues with the ESRB.

=== Post-launch content ===
Before the game's launch, two versions of Matt Hardy were announced as the pre-order bonus for the game, featuring both his standard and "Broken" Matt personas. The contents of the Elite Edition was also revealed and made available for digital pre-order that same day, containing the Matt Hardy pre-order bonus, a one-day early access before wide release and the Season One Pass, which itself includes FTR (Cash Wheeler and Dax Harwood), "Limitless" Keith Lee, The Bunny, Hook, and Danhausen, as well as four additional mini-games.

In July 2023, a new Stadium Stampede mode was announced as part of a free update, loosely based on the match stipulation of the same name but presented as an online multiplayer battle royale game mode for up to 30 players to fight in an open arena environment set in a stadium, where players can level up, customize weapon loadouts and skills, with item chests and vehicles, with visual comparisons being made to games like Fortnite. On August 23, 2023, AEW general manager, Tony Khan, AEW executive-vice president and head of AEW Games, Kenny Omega and Eddie Kingston announced that the Stadium Stampede mode would launch the following day in a video message filmed at EverBank Stadium in Jacksonville, Florida ahead of the All In pay-per-view at Wembley Stadium in London, England.

In November 2023, Season Pass Two was announced, which included wrestlers Toni Storm, The Acclaimed (Anthony Bowens and Max Caster), a new arena based on the updated AEW Dynamite arena and a new game mode in Beat the Elite, a fighting game style arcade mode where the player faces ten wrestlers in order, with the final battle being against a member of The Elite, to earn exclusive rewards based on game difficulty settings.

In February 2024, Season Pass Three was announced featuring Swerve Strickland, Claudio Castagnoli, and Jamie Hayter, a new arena with a ring set at beachside and various additional wrestling moves, music tracks, skins and clothing options for customizing.

In May 2024, Season Pass Four was released, featuring Adam Copeland, Jay White, Samoa Joe, two new arenas, a new tournament game mode and various additional wrestling moves, music tracks, skins and clothing options for customizing.

== Release ==
On August 3, 2022, AEW and THQ Nordic released an official teaser for the game, along with the cover art featuring CM Punk, Dr. Britt Baker, D.M.D., Kenny Omega, Chris Jericho, Jon Moxley, and Jade Cargill. However, following CM Punk's indefinite suspension following a backstage altercation at All Out, a new cover art without him was revealed in November, additionally featuring Sting, MJF, Orange Cassidy, Bryan Danielson, and "Hangman" Adam Page, alongside the wrestlers of the previous cover art.

On August 12, 2022, a trailer at the THQ Nordic Digital Showcase featuring Dr. Britt Baker, D.M.D. and Tony Schiavone was revealed, with one-on-one gameplay, as well as a look at the different mini-games in Fight Forever. It was also announced that a demo of the game would be playable at Gamescom, winning the award for Best Sports Game at the event. On September 15, 2022, a demo was also playable at the Tokyo Game Show.

In March 2023, at a press conference following the Revolution event, Tony Khan stated that Fight Forever was complete, and that they would announce a release date soon. However, THQ Nordic community manager Per Hollenbo would clarify on his Twitter account that the game was not finished, and was still being prepared for release.

On May 16, 2023, the achievements for the game were listed on Xbox platforms. On May 22, 2023, in a special video message from Kenny Omega, it was announced that Fight Forever would release internationally on June 29, 2023, with pre-orders and pre-loads officially commencing that same day.

== Reception ==
Reception

Aggregate scores
Aggregator	Score
Metacritic	(NS) 57/100 (PC) 68/100 (PS5) 64/100 (XSXS) 66/100
OpenCritic	37% recommended (Note: Based on 95 critic reviews.)

Review scores
Publication	Score
Destructoid	8/10
Game Informer	6.25/10
GameSpot	6/10
GamesRadar+	3.5/5
IGN	6/10
Polygon	Recommends
Slant Magazine	4/5

AEW Fight Forever received "mixed or average" reviews from critics, according to review aggregator website Metacritic. On OpenCritic, another review aggregator website, the game received a "weak" rating with only 37 percent of critics recommending the game.

Polygon's Hector Diaz lauded the arcade style of gameplay, favorably comparing it to classic wrestling titles such as the AKI developed WWF No Mercy and WCW/nWo Revenge, and early games in the WWE SmackDown! series. Nintendo Life's Chris Scullion stated the gameplay "will feel right at home to No Mercy fans" due to similar mechanics and "a lot of it does feel like where we'd be if AKI's series had continued to evolve and not stopped in 2000." Justin Clarke of Slant Magazine considered the gameplay noticeably different from the WWE 2K series, with particular praise to the hardcore match types such as the Lights Out and Exploding Barbed Wire Deathmatch as highlights, saying they "[push] the envelope in ways wrestling games haven't in years".

The Road To Elite mode drew mixed reactions from critics, with Jarrett Green of IGN writing that while it was an earnest attempt at recreating a classic wrestling game story mode and featured a lot of humour, Green considered the mode to be poorly and under written, whilst also lacking direction to its branching paths, concluding that there was "a bunch of potential in this mode, but it goes unrealized". Marcus Stewart of Game Informer criticized the mode, particularly the side activities and cutscenes between matches as being repetitive, while also finding many options were redundant when playing as non-custom player created wrestlers. Stewart was also disappointed by only one woman wrestler focused story in the mode. Conversely, Ben Wilson of GamesRadar+ praised the humour, structure, and pacing, while enjoying the use of archive footage of AEW's history into the story.

The customization options drew criticism from many reviewers for lacking in depth and choice, with Joe Draper of Digital Spy finding the feature underwhelming when compared to past wrestling games, while Steward of Game Informer called it the "biggest let down" of the game, taking issue with the limited choices for players and the inability to share creations online. Jason Fanelli of GameSpot and Hector Diaz of Polygon were both disappointed the absence of some major AEW wrestlers in the base roster, including Toni Storm and Jamie Hayter (both later released as DLC) and the lack of 3 versus 3 tag matches as a mode with corresponding AEW World Trios Championship.

The Nintendo Switch version of the game was reported to have performance issues, including pauses and crashes during gameplay, with its frame rate reaching 30 frames per second compared to 60 frames on other platforms. The PlayStation 4 version was also reported to have numerous glitches and error codes at launch. Responding to a fan on Twitter, Kenny Omega acknowledged criticisms of the game, stating there would be continued future support, encouraging fixes and rebalancing.

=== Sales ===
Fight Forever was the third best-selling game in the United Kingdom in the week it was released behind The Legend of Zelda: Tears of the Kingdom and Final Fantasy XVI.
