= Virtual Pro Wrestling 2: Ōdō Keishō =

2000 video game

- Cover art of Virtual Pro Wrestling 2
- Developer: AKI Corporation
- Publisher: Asmik Ace Entertainment
- Series: Virtual Pro Wrestling
- Platform: Nintendo 64
- Release: JP: January 28, 2000
- Genre: Wrestling
- Modes: Single-player, multiplayer

Virtual Pro Wrestling 2: Ōdō Keishō (バーチャル・プロレス2 〜王道継承〜) is a professional wrestling video game released in 2000 for the Nintendo 64. The game was only released in Japan and is the sequel to 1997's Virtual Pro Wrestling 64. The subtitle, Ōdō Keishō, translates to English as Royal Road Succession, which is also the name of the game's single player mode.

The game features the same engine as WWF WrestleMania 2000 but the two titles otherwise differ considerably and feature entirely different rosters. WrestleMania 2000 was released in Japan as well, unlike previous AKI-developed WCW titles.

== Production ==
At the 1999 Nintendo Space World, fans got a preview of the game which was 65% completed. Modes boasted were Tournament, League, Ranking and Grand Meeting, as well as the newly added Belt Edit, Champion Road and an expanded player creation mode. The game was said to have over 1,000 different move combinations and a roster of "way over 100 fighters".

== Features ==
Catering to the Japanese fanbase, Virtual Pro Wrestling 2: Ōdō Keishō deemphasizes the gimmicks and theatrics of American wrestling while introducing various competitive, sportsman-like attributes of puroresu. It features no WWF license and is based entirely on Japanese wrestling; consequently, unlike previous games which included WCW wrestlers, none of the current WWF superstars at the time were included in VPW 2. Asmik Ace Entertainment was only licensed to genuinely represent talent from AJPW; thus, for legal purposes, all other performers were given generic names and altered apparel with the ability to be modified by the player.

VPW 2 omitted the newly introduced Cage match and First Blood match of WrestleMania 2000 as they were unconventional to Japanese wrestling (a common misconception is that a "First Blood" option does exist, whereby, if the wrestler bleeds twice the match is stopped by the official - however this is a referee stoppage match setting). It did, however, resurrect the test-of-strength grappling function and the striking combination grapple from 1998's WCW/nWo Revenge. It also introduced the running grapple as an intuitive counterpart to the long-established running strike. VPW 2 boasts hundreds of moves including many prohibited in mainstream American wrestling such as the dangerous hangman's DDT, Russian neckdrop, and Burning Hammer. In a first for 3D wrestling games, an entirely unique grappling system was also developed for mixed martial artists which corresponds with optional shootfighting rules. Such stipulations place emphasis on strike combinations, judo takedowns, and submissions and allows strikes to cause substantial damage. This in conjunction with professional wrestling standards allows for unique hybrid-style matches.

In contrast to the theatrical entrances of American pro wrestlers, performers in VPW 2 are given a simple backstage intro and are audibly announced upon entering the ring. Venues include the Nippon Budokan, Kawasaki Stadium, Korakuen Hall, and the Tokyo Dome. Entrance themes are limited to a few signature AJPW themes and original MIDI songs of generic rock music. The player can also choose from three different referees with distinct reaction times and count speeds.

VPW 2 expanded the Create a Wrestler mode that debuted in WrestleMania 2000 and boasts a detailed mask editing feature. The game includes a largely generic roster based on real-life performers which sets the foundation for the player to modify attire and names to create more faithful representations of the actual wrestlers. VPW 2 is the only game in the THQ/AKI series to include a "Logic" factor. When creating a wrestler, the player can choose what types of moves are used at certain points of the match when the created wrestler is controlled by the computer. The Belt Creation mode is carried over with a new addition, the Triple Crown, which unifies three championship belts (the PWF World Heavyweight Championship, NWA International Heavyweight Championship, and NWA United National Championship). The "Smoking Skull" WWF Heavyweight Championship was originally available for selection within Belt Creation mode, but it was removed from the final version of the game and is currently only accessible through video game cheat devices.

The 12-month Royal Road Succession mode largely parallels the Road to WrestleMania mode included in WrestleMania 2000. As common in Japan, some contests are held over large loving cup trophies rather than championship belts, and opportunities to unlock wrestlers are abundant.

== Roster ==
=== All Japan Pro Wrestling ===
- Giant Baba
- Mitsuharu Misawa
- Yoshinari Ogawa
- Masahito Kakihara
- Kenta Kobashi
- Jun Akiyama
- Kentaro Shiga
- Toshiaki Kawada
- Akira Taue
- Takao Omori
- Yoshihiro Takayama
- Hiroshi Hase
- Jun Izumida
- Maunakea Mossman
- Big Van Vader
- Stan Hansen
- Johnny Ace
- Mike Barton (aka Bart Gunn)
- Gary Albright
- Johnny Smith
- Giant Kimala

=== New Japan Pro-Wrestling ===
- Shinya Hashimoto
- Tatsumi Fujinami
- Kensuke Sasaki
- Shiro Koshinaka
- Manabu Nakanishi
- Yuji Nagata
- Kazuo Yamazaki
- Tadao Yasuda
- Masahiro Chono
- Keiji Mutoh
- Hiroyoshi Tenzan
- Satoshi Kojima
- Hiro Saito
- Scott Norton
- Jushin Liger
- El Samurai
- Kendo Kashin
- Dr. Wagner Jr.
- Shinjiro Otani
- Tatsuhito Takaiwa
- Koji Kanemoto

=== Frontier Martial-Arts Wrestling ===
- Hayabusa
- Masato Tanaka
- Kodo Fuyuki
- Mr. Gannosuke
- Jado
- Gedo
- The Gladiator (Mike Awesome)
- Genichiro Tenryu

=== Michinoku Pro Wrestling, Osaka Pro Wrestling, and Toryumon ===
- The Great Sasuke
- Jinsei Shinzaki
- Taka Michinoku
- Gran Naniwa
- Super Delfin
- Magnum Tokyo
- Shiima Nobunaga (aka CIMA)
- Dragon Kid

=== Fighting Network Rings ===
- Kiyoshi Tamura
- Tsuyoshi Kosaka
- Tariel Bitsadze
- Volk Han

=== Pancrase ===
- Masakatsu Funaki
- Yoshiki Takahashi
- Minoru Suzuki
- Kengo Watanabe
- Semmy Schilt

=== Pride Fighting Championships ===
- Nobuhiko Takada
- Kazushi Sakuraba
- Enson Inoue
- Rumina Sato

=== Battlarts ===
- Yuki Ishikawa
- Alexander Otsuka
- Daisuke Ikeda
- Minoru Tanaka

=== Wrestling Legends ===
- Jumbo Tsuruta
- Mil Máscaras
- Terry Funk
- Dory Funk Jr.
- Terry Gordy
- "Dr. Death" Steve Williams
- Bruiser Brody
- Abdullah the Butcher
- André the Giant
- Akira Maeda
- Aleksandr Karelin
- Rickson Gracie
- Mark Kerr
- Bas Rutten
- Keiji Muto
- Último Dragón
- Antonio Inoki
- Naoya Ogawa
- Riki Choshu
- Don Frye
- Tiger Mask (Satoru Sayama)
- Yoshiaki Fujiwara
- Atsushi Onita

== Reception ==
Virtual Pro Wrestling 2: Ōdō Keishō gained positive reviews. On release, Famitsu magazine scored the game a 30 out of 40 and while IGN's Aaron Boulding criticized the bland pre-match animation, he praised the addition of various moves. Regarding American gamers, Boulding considered it "a nice addition to the library of the most extreme hardcore wrestling fan".

With a strong fanbase behind the AKI wrestling game series, VPW 2 would become the second most popular import title on the N64 after Sin and Punishment. Professional wrestlers Samoa Joe and A.J. Styles, who were both involved in the development of TNA Wrestling's first video game, had hoped the game would replicate the style of VPW 2. Styles, an avid fan of the AKI wrestling series, has cited VPW 2 as the all-time greatest pro wrestling game.

== See also ==
- WWF No Mercy
- List of licensed professional wrestling video games
