= List of best-selling Nintendo 64 video games =

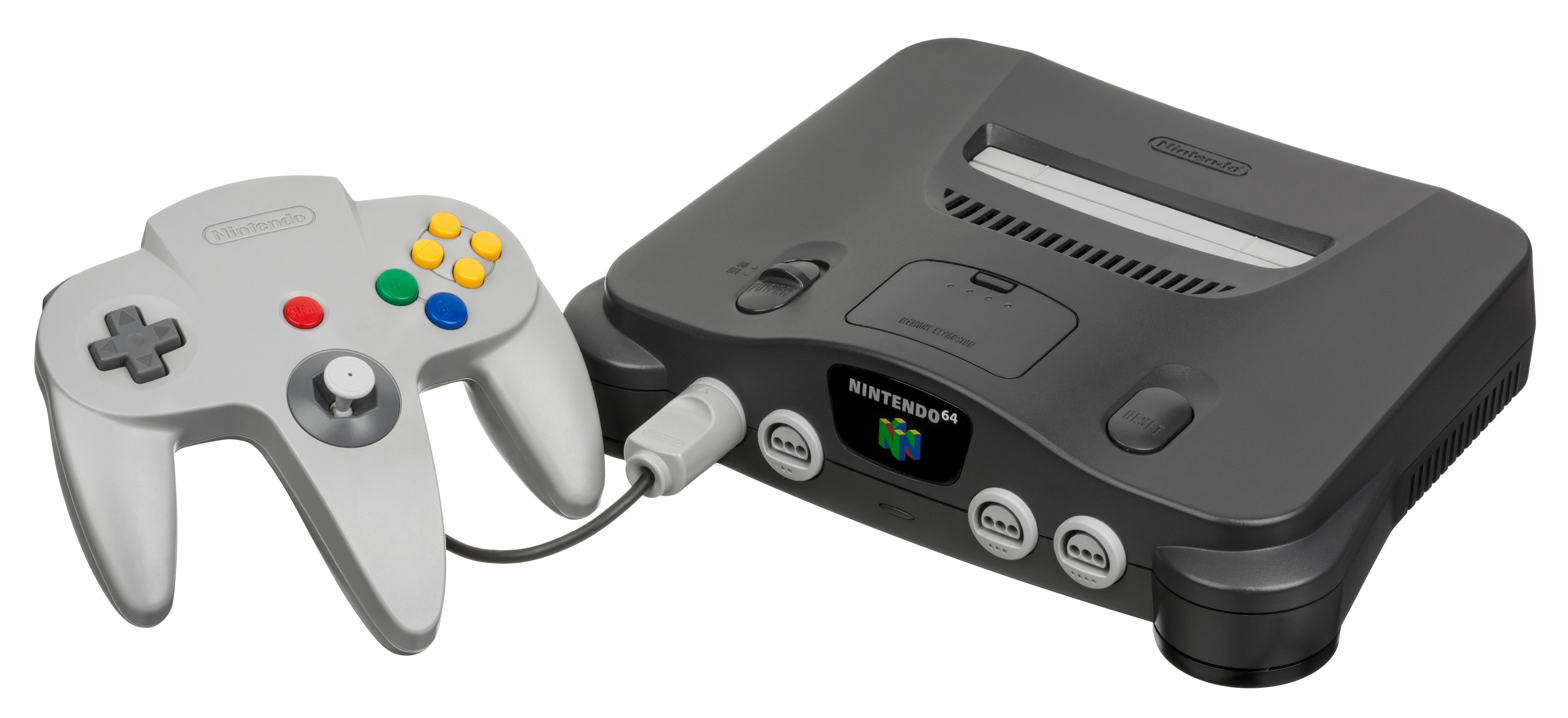
Nintendo 64 with controller

This is a list of video games for the Nintendo 64 video game console that have sold or shipped at least one million copies. The best-selling game on the Nintendo 64 is Super Mario 64. First released in Japan on June 23, 1996, it was a launch title for the system and the first Super Mario game to use three-dimensional graphics. The game went on to sell nearly 12 million units worldwide. Mario Kart 64, the second in the Mario Kart series, is the second-best-selling game on the platform, with sales of more than 9.8 million units. The console's top five is rounded out by Rare's GoldenEye 007 in third, with sales of just over 8 million units, The Legend of Zelda: Ocarina of Time in fourth, with 7.6 million units sold worldwide, and Super Smash Bros. in fifth, with sales of more than 5.5 million units.

There are a total of 53 Nintendo 64 games on this list which are confirmed to have sold or shipped at least one million units. Of these, 13 were developed by internal Nintendo development divisions. Other developers with the most million-selling games include Rare and AKI Corporation, with seven and four games respectively in the list of 52. Of the 52 games on this list, 35 were published in one or more regions by Nintendo. Other publishers with multiple million-selling games include THQ with four games, Rare with three games, and Acclaim Entertainment with two games. The most popular franchises on Nintendo 64 include Pokémon (14.55 million combined units), The Legend of Zelda (10.96 million combined units), Donkey Kong (10.15 million combined units), and Star Wars (7.87 million combined units).

== List ==
Key
†	Game was bundled with Nintendo 64 consoles during its lifetime

Game	Developer(s) (Note: Only developers and publishers for the original release of each game are listed.)	Publisher(s)	Release date (Note: Only the initial release date on this platform is listed.)	Sales	Ref.
Super Mario 64 †	Nintendo EAD	Nintendo	June 23, 1996	11,910,000	
Mario Kart 64 †	Nintendo EAD	Nintendo	December 14, 1996	9,870,000	
GoldenEye 007 †	Rare	Nintendo	August 25, 1997	8,090,000	
The Legend of Zelda: Ocarina of Time †	Nintendo EAD	Nintendo	November 21, 1998	7,600,000	
Super Smash Bros.	HAL Laboratory	Nintendo	January 21, 1999	5,550,000	
Pokémon Stadium †	Nintendo EAD	Nintendo	April 30, 1999	5,460,000	
Donkey Kong 64 †	Rare	Nintendo	November 22, 1999	5,270,000	
Diddy Kong Racing	Rare	Rare	November 14, 1997	4,880,000	
Star Fox 64	Nintendo EAD	Nintendo	April 27, 1997	4,000,000	
Banjo-Kazooie †	Rare	Nintendo	June 29, 1998	3,650,000	
Pokémon Snap †	HAL Laboratory; Pax Softonica	Nintendo	March 21, 1999	3,630,000	
The Legend of Zelda: Majora's Mask	Nintendo EAD	Nintendo	April 27, 2000	3,360,000	
Star Wars Episode I: Racer †	LucasArts	LucasArts	April 30, 1999	3,120,000	
Wave Race 64 †	Nintendo EAD	Nintendo	September 27, 1996	2,940,000	
Yoshi's Story	Nintendo EAD	Nintendo	December 21, 1997	2,850,000	
Mario Party	Hudson Soft	Nintendo	December 18, 1998	2,700,000	
Star Wars: Shadows of the Empire †	LucasArts	Nintendo	December 3, 1996	2,600,000	
Pokémon Stadium 2	Nintendo EAD	Nintendo	December 14, 2000	2,540,000	
Perfect Dark †	Rare	Rare	May 22, 2000	2,520,000	
Mario Party 2	Hudson Soft	Nintendo	December 17, 1999	2,480,000	
Mario Tennis	Camelot Software Planning	Nintendo	July 21, 2000	2,320,000	
Star Wars: Rogue Squadron	Factor 5; LucasArts	LucasArts	December 7, 1998	2,170,000	
1080° Snowboarding †	Nintendo EAD	Nintendo	February 28, 1998	2,030,000	
Excitebike 64	Left Field Productions	Nintendo	April 30, 2000	2,000,000	
Mario Party 3	Hudson Soft	Nintendo	December 7, 2000	1,910,000	
WCW/nWo Revenge	AKI Corporation; Asmik Ace Entertainment	THQ	October 26, 1998	1,880,000	
Hey You, Pikachu! †	Ambrella	Nintendo	December 12, 1998	1,830,000	
Kirby 64: The Crystal Shards	HAL Laboratory	Nintendo	March 24, 2000	1,770,000	
Cruis'n USA	Williams	Nintendo	December 3, 1996	1,720,000	
Tony Hawk's Pro Skater	Edge of Reality	Activision	February 29, 2000	1,610,000	
F-1 World Grand Prix †	Paradigm Entertainment	Nintendo	July 31, 1998	1,600,000	
Turok: Dinosaur Hunter	Iguana Entertainment	Acclaim Entertainment	March 4, 1997	1,500,000	
Banjo-Tooie	Rare	Nintendo	November 20, 2000	1,490,000	
Mario Golf	Camelot Software Planning	Nintendo	June 11, 1999	1,470,000	
Turok 2: Seeds of Evil	Iguana Entertainment	Acclaim Entertainment	October 21, 1998	1,400,000	
Paper Mario	Intelligent Systems	Nintendo	August 11, 2000	1,370,000	
WCW vs. nWo: World Tour	AKI Corporation; Asmik Ace Entertainment	THQ	November 30, 1997	1,300,000	
Mission: Impossible	Ocean Software	Infogrames	July 16, 1998	1,200,000	
Kobe Bryant in NBA Courtside	Left Field Productions	Nintendo	April 27, 1998	1,190,000	
WWF No Mercy	AKI Corporation; Asmik Ace Entertainment	THQ	November 17, 2000	1,190,000	
Jet Force Gemini	Rare	Rare	October 11, 1999	1,160,000	
WWF WrestleMania 2000	AKI Corporation; Asmik Ace Entertainment	THQ	October 12, 1999	1,140,000	
Pilotwings 64	Nintendo EAD; Nintendo R&D3; Paradigm Entertainment	Nintendo	June 23, 1996	1,120,000	
F-Zero X	Nintendo EAD	Nintendo	July 14, 1998	1,100,000	
Pocket Monsters Stadium	Nintendo EAD	Nintendo	August 1, 1998	1,094,765	
007: The World Is Not Enough	Eurocom	Electronic Arts	October 17, 2000	1,080,000	
Namco Museum 64	Mass Media Games	Namco	October 31, 1999	1,040,000	
Bomberman 64	Hudson Soft	JP: Hudson Soft; WW: Nintendo	September 26, 1997	1,000,000	
Bomberman Hero	A.I	JP: Hudson Soft; WW: Nintendo	April 30, 1998	1,000,000	
Waialae Country Club: True Golf Classics	T&E Soft	Nintendo	July 27, 1998	1,000,000	
South Park Rally	Tantalus Interactive	Acclaim Entertainment	February 28, 2000	1,000,000	
International Superstar Soccer 64	Konami	Konami	December 20, 1996	1,000,000	
Snowboard Kids	Racdym	Atlus	December 12, 1997	1,000,000	

== See also ==
- List of best-selling Nintendo video games
