= D.I.C.E. Award for Fighting Game of the Year =

Annual award presented by the Academy of Interactive Arts & Sciences

- Country: United States
- Presented by: Academy of Interactive Arts & Sciences
- First award: 1998
- Currently held by: Mortal Kombat: Legacy Kollection
- Website: www.interactive.org

The D.I.C.E. Award for Fighting Game of the Year is an award presented annually by the Academy of Interactive Arts & Sciences during the D.I.C.E. Awards. This award recognizes "titles that offer the use the virtual experience of controlling a character engaging in individual combat with another character usually from a fixed camera perspective. The opponent can either be controlled by another player or by the game". All active creative/technical, business, and affiliate members of the Academy are qualified to vote for this category. It was originally titled Console Fighting Game of the Year, before it was simplified to just Fighting Game of the Year. It is one of two categories, the other being Online Game of the Year, that is not limited to release within the calendar year but must be supported by significant new content.

The award's most recent winner is Mortal Kombat: Legacy Kollection, developed by Digital Eclipse and published by Atari.

== Winners and nominees ==
=== 1990s ===
Table key
Indicates the winner

Year	Game	Developer(s)	Publisher(s)	Ref.
1997/1998 (1st)	WCW vs. nWo: World Tour	Asmik Ace Entertainment	THQ	
1997/1998 (1st)	Bloody Roar	Hudson Soft	Sony Computer Entertainment	
1997/1998 (1st)	Bushido Blade	Lightweight	Sony Computer Entertainment	
1997/1998 (1st)	Street Fighter EX Plus α	Arika	Capcom	
1997/1998 (1st)	WCW Nitro	Inland Productions	THQ	
1998/1999 (2nd)	WCW/nWo Revenge	AKI Corporation	THQ	
1998/1999 (2nd)	Bushido Blade 2	Lightweight	Square Electronic Arts	
1998/1999 (2nd)	WWF War Zone	Iguana West	Acclaim Entertainment	
1999/2000 (3rd)	Soulcalibur	Namco	Namco	
1999/2000 (3rd)	Ready 2 Rumble Boxing	Midway Studios San Diego	Midway Games	
1999/2000 (3rd)	Super Smash Bros.	HAL Laboratory	Nintendo	
1999/2000 (3rd)	WWF WrestleMania 2000	AKI Corporation	THQ	

=== 2000s ===
Year	Game	Developer(s)	Publisher(s)	Ref.
2000 (4th)	Dead or Alive 2	Team Ninja	Tecmo, Acclaim Entertainment	
2000 (4th)	Ready 2 Rumble Boxing: Round 2	Midway Studios San Diego	Midway Games	
2000 (4th)	Tekken Tag Tournament	Namco	Namco	
2000 (4th)	Ultimate Fighting Championship	Anchor Inc.	Crave Entertainment	
2000 (4th)	WWF No Mercy	AKI Corporation	THQ	
2001 (5th)	Dead or Alive 3	Team Ninja	Tecmo	
2001 (5th)	Super Smash Bros. Melee	HAL Laboratory	Nintendo	
2001 (5th)	Victorious Boxers: Ippo's Road to Glory	New Corporation	Empire Interactive	
2002 (6th)	Tekken 4	Namco	Namco	
2002 (6th)	Capcom vs. SNK 2 EO	Capcom	Capcom	
2002 (6th)	Godzilla: Destroy All Monsters Melee	Pipeworks Software	Infogrames, Atari	
2002 (6th)	Mortal Kombat: Deadly Alliance	Midway Games	Midway Games	
2002 (6th)	Virtua Fighter 4	Sega AM2	Sega	
2003 (7th)	Soulcalibur II	Namco	Namco	
2003 (7th)	Def Jam Vendetta	EA Canada, AKI Corporation	Electronic Arts	
2003 (7th)	Dragon Ball Z: Budokai 2	Dimps	Atari	
2003 (7th)	Virtua Fighter 4: Evolution	Sega AM2	Sega	
2003 (7th)	War of the Monsters	Incognito Entertainment	Sony Computer Entertainment	
2003 (7th)	WWE SmackDown! Here Comes the Pain	Yuke's	THQ	
2004 (8th)	Mortal Kombat: Deception	Midway Games	Midway Games	
2004 (8th)	Def Jam: Fight for NY	EA Canada, AKI Corporation	Electronic Arts	
2004 (8th)	Dragon Ball Z: Budokai 3	Dimps	Atari	
2005 (9th)	Soulcalibur III	Namco	Namco	
2005 (9th)	Fight Night Round 2	EA Chicago	EA Sports	
2005 (9th)	Tekken 5	Namco	Namco	
2005 (9th)	WWE SmackDown! vs. Raw 2006	Yuke's	THQ	
2006 (10th)	Fight Night Round 3	EA Chicago	EA Sports	
2006 (10th)	Mortal Kombat: Armageddon	Midway Games	Midway Games	
2006 (10th)	Tekken: Dark Resurrection	Namco, Eighting	Namco Bandai Games	
2006 (10th)	WWE SmackDown! vs. Raw 2007	Yuke's	THQ	
2007 (11th)
2007 (11th)	No award given			
2008 (12th)	Super Smash Bros. Brawl	Sora Ltd.	Nintendo	
2008 (12th)	Mortal Kombat vs. DC Universe	Midway Games	Midway Games	
2008 (12th)	Soulcalibur IV	Namco Bandai Games	Namco Bandai Games	
2008 (12th)	Super Street Fighter II Turbo HD Remix	Backbone Entertainment	Capcom	
2008 (12th)	WWE SmackDown! vs. Raw 2009	Yuke's	THQ	
2009 (13th)	Street Fighter IV	Dimps, Capcom	Capcom	
2009 (13th)	Fight Night Round 4	EA Canada	EA Sports	
2009 (13th)	Punch-Out!!	Next Level Games	Nintendo	
2009 (13th)	Tekken 6	Namco Bandai Games	Namco Bandai Games	
2009 (13th)	UFC 2009 Undisputed	Yuke's	THQ	

=== 2010s ===
Year	Game	Developer(s)	Publisher(s)	Ref.
2010 (14th)	Super Street Fighter IV	Dimps, Capcom	Capcom	
2010 (14th)	BlazBlue: Continuum Shift	Arc System Works	Aksys Games	
2010 (14th)	EA Sports MMA	EA Tiburon	EA Sports	
2010 (14th)	UFC Undisputed 2010	Yuke's	THQ	
2011 (15th)	Mortal Kombat	NetherRealm Studios	Warner Bros. Interactive Entertainment	
2011 (15th)	Fight Night Champion	EA Canada	EA Sports	
2011 (15th)	The King of Fighters XIII	SNK	Atlus	
2011 (15th)	Super Street Fighter IV: 3D Edition	Dimps, Capcom	Capcom	
2011 (15th)	Ultimate Marvel vs. Capcom 3	Capcom, Eighting	Capcom	
2012 (16th)	PlayStation All-Stars Battle Royale	SuperBot Entertainment	Sony Computer Entertainment	
2012 (16th)	Persona 4 Arena	Arc System Works, P-Studio	Atlus	
2012 (16th)	Soulcalibur V	Namco Bandai Games	Namco Bandai Games	
2012 (16th)	Street Fighter X Tekken	Dimps, Capcom	Capcom	
2012 (16th)	Tekken Tag Tournament 2	Namco Bandai Games	Namco Bandai Games	
2013 (17th)	Injustice: Gods Among Us	NetherRealm Studios	Warner Bros. Interactive Entertainment	
2013 (17th)	Divekick	Iron Galaxy, One True Game Studios	Iron Galaxy	
2013 (17th)	Killer Instinct	Double Helix Games	Microsoft Studios	
2014 (18th)	Super Smash Bros. for Wii U	Sora Ltd., Bandai Namco Studios	Nintendo	
2014 (18th)	Guilty Gear Xrd -SIGN-	Arc System Works	Aksys Games	
2014 (18th)	Nidhogg	Messhof	Messhof	
2014 (18th)	Ultra Street Fighter IV	Dimps, Capcom	Capcom	
2015 (19th)	Mortal Kombat X	NetherRealm Studios	Warner Bros. Interactive Entertainment	
2015 (19th)	Dead or Alive 5 Last Round	Team Ninja	Koei Tecmo	
2015 (19th)	Rising Thunder	Radiant Entertainment	Riot Games	
2016 (20th)	Street Fighter V	Dimps, Capcom	Capcom	
2016 (20th)	EA Sports UFC 2	EA Canada	EA Sports	
2016 (20th)	Guilty Gear Xrd -REVELATOR-	Arc System Works	Aksys Games	
2016 (20th)	Killer Instinct Season 3	Iron Galaxy	Microsoft Studios	
2016 (20th)	Pokkén Tournament	Bandai Namco Studios	Nintendo, The Pokémon Company	
2017 (21st)	Injustice 2	NetherRealm Studios	Warner Bros. Interactive Entertainment	
2017 (21st)	Arms	Nintendo EPD	Nintendo	
2017 (21st)	Marvel vs. Capcom: Infinite	Capcom	Capcom	
2017 (21st)	Nidhogg 2	Messhof	Messhof	
2017 (21st)	Tekken 7	Bandai Namco Studios	Bandai Namco Entertainment	
2018 (22nd)	Super Smash Bros. Ultimate	Sora Ltd., Bandai Namco Studios	Nintendo	
2018 (22nd)	BlazBlue: Cross Tag Battle	Arc System Works	Arc System Works	
2018 (22nd)	Dragon Ball FighterZ	Arc System Works	Bandai Namco Entertainment	
2018 (22nd)	Soulcalibur VI	Bandai Namco Studios, Dimps	Bandai Namco Entertainment	
2019 (23rd)	Mortal Kombat 11	NetherRealm Studios	Warner Bros. Interactive Entertainment	
2019 (23rd)	Dead or Alive 6	Team Ninja	Koei Tecmo	
2019 (23rd)	Jump Force	Spike Chunsoft	Bandai Namco Entertainment	
2019 (23rd)	Samurai Shodown	SNK	Deep Silver	

=== 2020s ===
Year	Game	Developer(s)	Publisher(s)	Ref.
2020 (24th)	Mortal Kombat 11: Ultimate	NetherRealm Studios	Warner Bros. Interactive Entertainment	
2020 (24th)	EA Sports UFC 4	EA Vancouver	EA Sports	
2020 (24th)	Granblue Fantasy Versus	Arc System Works	Xseed Games, Cygames, Marvelous	
2020 (24th)	Them's Fightin' Herds	Mane6	Maximum Games	
2021 (25th)	Guilty Gear Strive	Arc System Works	Arc System Works	
2021 (25th)	Melty Blood: Type Lumina	French-Bread	Delightworks	
2021 (25th)	Nickelodeon All-Star Brawl	Ludosity, Fair Play Labs	GameMill Entertainment	
2022 (26th)	MultiVersus	Player First Games	Warner Bros. Games	
2022 (26th)	JoJo's Bizarre Adventure: All Star Battle R	CyberConnect2	Bandai Namco Entertainment	
2022 (26th)	Rumbleverse	Iron Galaxy	Epic Games	
2022 (26th)	Spiderheck	Neverjam	tinyBuild	
2022 (26th)	The King of Fighters XV	SNK	SNK	
2023 (27th)	Street Fighter 6	Capcom	Capcom	
2023 (27th)	Granblue Fantasy Versus: Rising	Arc System Works	Cygames	
2023 (27th)	Mortal Kombat 1	NetherRealm Studios	Warner Bros. Games	
2023 (27th)	Nickelodeon All-Star Brawl 2	Fair Play Labs	GameMill Entertainment	
2023 (27th)	Pocket Bravery	Statera Studio	Pqube	
2024 (28th)	Tekken 8	Bandai Namco Studios	Bandai Namco Entertainment	
2024 (28th)	Blazing Strike	RareBreed Makes Games	Aksys Games	
2024 (28th)	Dragon Ball: Sparking! Zero	Spike Chunsoft	Bandai Namco Entertainment	
2024 (28th)	Mortal Kombat 1: Khaos Reigns	NetherRealm Studios	Warner Bros. Games	
2024 (28th)	Underdogs	One Hamsa	One Hamsa	
2025 (29th)	Mortal Kombat: Legacy Kollection	Digital Eclipse	Atari	
2025 (29th)	2XKO	Riot Games	Riot Games	
2025 (29th)	Capcom Fighting Collection 2	Capcom	Capcom	
2025 (29th)	Fatal Fury: City of the Wolves	SNK	SNK	
2025 (29th)	WWE 2K25	Visual Concepts	2K Games	

== Multiple nominations and wins ==
=== Developers and publishers ===
The combined nominations of Namco and Bandai Namco makes them the most nominated and award-winning developer. As a publisher, Warner Bros. Interactive Entertainment / Warner Bros. Games has won the most awards. There have been numerous developer/publishers with back-to-back wins:

- Team Ninja and Tecmo won in 2001 with Dead or Alive 2, and 2002 with Dead or Alive 3.
- Namco won in 2003 with Tekken 4, and 2004 with Soulcalibur II.
- Dimps and Capcom won in 2010 with Street Fighter IV, and 2011 with Super Street Fighter IV.
- NetherRealm Studios and Warner Bros. Interactive Entertainment won in 2020 with Mortal Kombat 11, and 2021 with Mortal Kombat 11: Ultimate.

THQ is the only publisher with back-to-back wins with different developers:

- 1998: WCW vs. nWo: World Tour developed by Asmik Ace Entertainment.
- 1999: WCW/nWo Revenge developed by AKI Corporation.

Developers
Developer	Nominations	Wins
Namco/Bandai Namco	17	7
NetherRealm Studios	8	6
Capcom	11	4
Dimps	9	3
Sora Ltd.	3	3
Team Ninja	4	2
Arc System Works	9	1
Midway Games	6	1
AKI Corporation	5	1
EA Chicago	2	1
Yuke's	6	0
EA Canada	5	0
SNK	4	0
Iron Galaxy	3	0
Eighting	2	0
Fair Play Labs	2	0
HAL Laboratory	2	0
Messhof	2	0
Sega AM2	2	0

Publishers
Publisher	Nominations	Wins
Warner Bros. Interactive Entertainment / Warner Bros. Games	9	7
Namco/Bandai Namco	18	5
Capcom	13	4
Nintendo	8	3
THQ	11	2
Tecmo/Koei Tecmo	4	2
Electronic Arts	10	1
Midway Games	5	1
Sony Computer Entertainment	4	1
Atari	3	1
Acclaim Entertainment	2	1
Arc System Works	2	1
Aksys Games	4	0
Atlus	2	0
Cygames	2	0
GameMill Entertainment	2	0
Messhof	2	0
Microsoft/Xbox Game Studios	2	0
Riot Games	2	0
Sega	2	0
SNK	2	0

=== Franchises ===
The most nominated franchises are Mortal Kombat, Street Fighter, and Tekken. The Mortal Kombat franchise has won the most awards, with Street Fighter having the second-most wins. The WWE (formerly WWF) has garnered the most nominations without a win. There have been numerous franchises with back-to-back wins:

- WCW vs. nWo: World Tour in 1998, and WCW/nWo Revenge in 1999
- Dead or Alive 2 in 2001, and Dead or Alive 3 in 2002
- Street Fighter IV in 2010, and Super Street Fighter IV in 2011
- Mortal Kombat 11 in 2020, and Mortal Kombat 11: Ultimate in 2021

Street Fighter IV and Mortal Kombat 11 are two games with multiple wins with re-releases. Virtua Fighter 4, Tekken 5, Killer Instinct, Guilty Gear Xrd, and Mortal Kombat 1 have had multiple nominations with re-releases and DLC expansions.

Franchise
Franchise	Nominations	Wins
Mortal Kombat	11	6
Street Fighter	9	4
Soulcalibur	6	3
Super Smash Bros.	5	3
Tekken	9	2
Dead or Alive	4	2
WCW/nWo	3	2
Injustice	2	2
Fight Night	4	1
Guilty Gear	3	1
WWF/WWE	8	0
Ultimate Fighting Championship	5	0
Dragon Ball	4	0
BlazBlue	2	0
Bushido Blade	2	0
Def Jam	2	0
Granblue Fantasy	2	0
Killer Instinct	2	0
Marvel vs. Capcom	2	0
Nickelodeon Brawl	2	0
Nidhogg	2	0
Ready 2 Rumble	2	0
The King of Fighters	2	0
Virtua Fighter	2	0
