= Galactic Wrestling =

2004 video game

- North American PlayStation 2 cover art
- Developer: AKI Corporation
- Publisher: Bandai
- Platform: PlayStation 2
- Release: JP: April 22, 2004; NA: June 30, 2004
- Genre: Fighting
- Modes: Single-player, multiplayer

Galactic Wrestling: Featuring Ultimate Muscle, known in Japan as Kinnikuman Generations (キン肉マン ジェネレーションズ), is a PlayStation 2 game produced by Bandai and released in 2004. Galactic Wrestling: Featuring Ultimate Muscle is an expansion of the GameCube game Ultimate Muscle: Legends vs. New Generation, which had been released in Japan on November 22, 2002 and in North America on June 5, 2003. The title of Galactic Wrestling, in Japan, is often abbreviated as Niku Gene (肉ジェネ). The game itself has an expansion called Kinnikuman Muscle Generations (キン肉マン マッスルジェネレーションズ), released in Japan on February 2, 2006 for the PlayStation Portable.

== Reception ==
Reception

Aggregate score
Aggregator	Score
Metacritic	61/100

Review scores
Publication	Score
Electronic Gaming Monthly	5.33/10
Famitsu	26/40
Game Informer	4.25/10
GamePro	3.5/5
GameSpot	7.3/10
GamesTM	6/10
Official U.S. PlayStation Magazine	2.5/5
PlayStation: The Official Magazine	7/10
X-Play	3/5
Maxim	6/10

Galactic Wrestling: Featuring Ultimate Muscle received "mixed" reviews according to video game review aggregator Metacritic. In Japan, Famitsu gave it a score of one seven, one six, one seven, and one six, for a total of 26 out of 40.

== See also ==
- Kinnikuman characters
- Kinnikuman Muscle Grand Prix
