= Virtual Pro Wrestling =

- Genre(s): Fighting, sports
- Developer(s): AKI Corporation
- Publisher(s): Asmik Ace Entertainment
- Platform(s): PlayStation, Nintendo 64
- First release: Virtual Pro Wrestling; September 1996
- Latest release: Virtual Pro Wrestling 2: Ōdō Keishō; January 2000

Virtual Pro Wrestling (Japanese: バーチャル・プロレスリング) is a professional wrestling video game series developed by AKI Corporation and published by Asmik Ace exclusively in Japan. The series started in 1996 with the release of the first Virtual Pro Wrestling for the PlayStation, which was localized in the West as WCW vs. the World. Two other games in the series were released exclusively for the Nintendo 64, Virtual Pro Wrestling 64 and Virtual Pro Wrestling 2.

All games in the series feature characters largely based on real-life wrestlers working for Japanese professional wrestling promotions. The series has been highly regarded for its gameplay engine, featuring weak/strong attacks and maneuvers and the Nintendo 64 games have been popular import titles.

The games served as the basis for several games published by THQ and based on the American wrestling promotions World Championship Wrestling (WCW) and the World Wrestling Federation (WWF). The first game in the series was released outside Japan as WCW vs. the World. The last two games in the series had Western counterparts in WCW vs. nWo: World Tour and WWF WrestleMania 2000.

Although AKI stopped producing Virtual Pro Wrestling titles, they continued to use tweaked versions of the gameplay system in newer titles such as Def Jam Vendetta, Def Jam: Fight for NY and games based on the Ultimate Muscle franchise such as Ultimate Muscle: Legends vs. New Generation.

== See also ==
- Fire Pro Wrestling
