= Def Jam Vendetta =

2003 video game

- Developers: AKI Corporation; EA Canada
- Publisher: EA Sports BIG: JP: EA Games
- Director: Hideyuki Iwashita
- Producer: Josh Holmes
- Writer: Mark Sawers
- Platforms: GameCube, PlayStation 2
- Release: PlayStation 2: NA: April 1, 2003; PAL: May 23, 2003; JP: August 21, 2003; GameCube: NA: April 1, 2003; PAL: May 23, 2003; AU: June 16, 2003
- Genres: Sports, fighting
- Modes: Single-player, multiplayer

Def Jam Vendetta is a 3D professional wrestling fighting video game developed by AKI Corporation and EA Canada and published by Electronic Arts under the EA Sports BIG label. It was released for the GameCube and PlayStation 2 in April 2003. The game is the first main installment in EA's Def Jam-licensed hip-hop video game series. It was the publisher's first attempt at a wrestling video game since WCW Backstage Assault. Several Def Jam hip-hop artists were featured in Def Jam Vendetta, including DMX, Method Man, Redman, Ludacris, N.O.R.E., Capone, Scarface, Ghostface Killah, Keith Murray, WC, Joe Budden and DJ Funkmaster Flex. Christina Milian was featured in the game as "Angel". Def Jam Vendetta was followed up by a direct sequel in 2004, titled Def Jam: Fight for NY.

== Gameplay ==
Def Jam Vendetta features a largely unmodified AKI engine, used in the company's Virtual Pro Wrestling games and its spinoffs with some minor "button mashing" elements added and more of an arcade than a simulation. The game plays very similarly to WWF No Mercy, and features a lengthy story mode that allows you to level up and enhance one of four player characters in your quest to become the most well known star in the urban fighting league and fight the undefeated underground boss, D-Mob (voiced by actor Christopher Judge).

Players can win in one of three ways; pin, submission or KO. Pins are done by pinning the opponent for 3 seconds before he can kick out. The player can trap opponents in holds that gradually weaken one of their body parts (head, body, legs and arms). This hold can be broken by touching the ropes. If one of those gauges reaches empty, the bones get broken and that player submits & automatically loses. Players can attack their opponent to build up a power gauge, letting them activate 'Blazin' mode. If the player successfully grabs an opponent in this state, he can perform a special move. If the opponent's health is low enough, they will be KO'd.

=== Characters ===
Def Jam Vendetta features 46 playable characters, including real-life hip hop artists signed to Def Jam at the time, as well as original characters. Christina Milian appears as Angel Rodriguez, a non-playable character. Japanese rappers Dabo and S-Word appear exclusively in the game's Japanese release.

D-Mob's Crew	Fighters	
Capone; D-Mob; Dabo^{JPN}; DMX; Funkmaster Flex; Ghostface Killah; Joe Budden; Keith Murray; Ludacris; Method Man; N.O.R.E.; Redman; Scarface; S-Word^{JPN}; WC	Arii; Briggs; Carla; Chukklez; Cruz; Dan G; Deebo; Deja; Drake; Headache; House; Iceberg; Manny; Masa; Moses	Nyne; Omar; Opal; Peewee; Penny; Pockets; Proof; Razor; Ruffneck; Sketch; Snowman; Spider; Steel; T'ai; Tank; Zaheer

== Plot ==
The player (or the Protagonist) can choose to play as one of four street fighters: Briggs, a dishonorably discharged soldier; Proof, an ex-superbike racer; Tank, a massive Japanese fighter, and the DJ Spider, although the story is the same for each of them.

Upon selecting their street fighter, the Protagonist is called to help out their friend Manny by taking his place in a street fight. Once the Protagonist wins a certain number of fights, they fight the rapper Scarface. Once the Protagonist defeats him, they get their first girlfriend, Deja. Other girls come up to the Protagonist every couple of street fights, and eventually the Protagonist chooses one to be their new girlfriend, resulting in them fighting each other.

N.O.R.E. challenges the Protagonist to a fight at Grimeyville in LeFrak City, Queens, New York City. The Protagonist arrives and nearly gets into a fight with D-Mob (Chris Judge). Not long after the fight, Manny signs himself and the Protagonist up for a tag team tournament. After a while, the Protagonist is challenged by Ludacris to a fight in Club Luda. Afterwards, D-Mob claims the Protagonist and Manny are nothing, adding that if anyone in the club wants power and respect, they must beat him at the Def Jam tournament. Manny tells the Protagonist to stop fighting, but is ignored.

DMX challenges the Protagonist, but must first overcome The Dragon House's offer. They then fight Method Man and Redman in the tag team tournament finale. Afterwards, the Protagonist fights DMX, and upon winning, receives an email from his girlfriend Angel (Christina Milian) who was taken by D-Mob, saying they need to talk. When they arrive at The Face Club, it is revealed that D-Mob sent House, Pockets and Snowman to stop them from coming to the Def Jam tournament. The Protagonist defeats them, but Manny knocks him out and joins D-Mob against his will. Waking up, the Protagonist enters the tournament and defeats their best fighters. D-Mob attempts to shoot the Protagonist but Manny takes the bullet and survives. The Protagonist triumphs over D-Mob and gets Angel back. As the Protagonist walks out and makes amends with Manny, D-Mob is arrested, leading directly into Def Jam: Fight for NY.

== Reception ==
Reception

Aggregate score
Aggregator	Score	
Aggregator	GameCube	PS2
Metacritic	81/100	80/100

Review scores
Publication	Score	
Publication	GameCube	PS2
AllGame	N/A	3/5
Electronic Gaming Monthly	N/A	7.67/10
Eurogamer	N/A	3/10
Game Informer	8.75/10	8.5/10
GamePro	4.5/5	4.5/5
GameRevolution	B−	B−
GameSpot	8.4/10	8.4/10
GameSpy	3/5	3/5
GameZone	8.7/10	9.2/10
IGN	8.9/10	8.9/10
Nintendo Power	3.7/5	N/A
Official U.S. PlayStation Magazine	N/A	4/5
The Cincinnati Enquirer	4/4	4/4
Entertainment Weekly	C+	C+

By July 2006, the PlayStation 2 version of Def Jam Vendetta had sold 750,000 copies and earned $30 million in the United States. Next Generation ranked it as the 82nd highest-selling game launched for the PlayStation 2, Xbox or GameCube between January 2000 and July 2006 in that country. Combined sales of the Def Jam series reached 1.8 million units in the United States by July 2006.

The Cincinnati Enquirer gave it a score of all four stars and stated: "Electronic Arts deserves kudos for breathing new life into the aging fighting genre with this title's fresh approach". However, The Village Voice gave it a score of six out of ten and said: "If only DMX could sic his pit bulls on you, Funkmaster Flex burst your eardrums ID'ing himself, or Redman burn you with a blunt". Entertainment Weekly gave it a C+ and called it "an uninspired wrestling title that lacks Def Jam's trademark sheen".

GameSpot named Def Jam Vendetta the best PlayStation 2 game of April 2003.

During the 7th Annual Interactive Achievement Awards, the Academy of Interactive Arts & Sciences nominated Def Jam Vendetta for "Console Fighting Game of the Year", "Outstanding Achievement in Character Performance - Female" for Christina Milian's vocal role as Angel, and "Outstanding Achievement in Character Performance - Male" for Method Man's vocal portrayal of himself.
