= Kinnikuman Muscle Grand Prix =

2006 video game

Kinnikuman Muscle Grand Prix (キン肉マン マッスルグランプリ) is a series of fighting video game developed by AKI Corporation, based on the popular Kinnikuman manga and anime series from Weekly Shonen Jump.

== Muscle Grand Prix ==
キン肉マン マッスルグランプリ (KINNIKUMAN MUSCLE GRAND PRIX)
- Developer: Aki Corporation
- Publisher: Banpresto
- Series: Kinnikuman Muscle Grand Prix
- Platform: Arcade
- Release: JP: 15 March 2006
- Genre: Fighting
- Modes: Single-player, multiplayer
- Arcade system: System 256

It includes 16 wrestlers and 11 stages.

== Muscle Grand Prix Max ==
キン肉マン マッスルグランプリMAX (KINNIKUMAN MUSCLE GRAND PRIX MAX)
- Retail box of the game
- Developer: Aki Corporation
- Publisher: Namco Bandai Games (Note: Released under the Bandai banner.)
- Series: Kinnikuman Muscle Grand Prix
- Platform: PlayStation 2
- Release: JP: 27 July 2006
- Genre: Fighting
- Modes: Single-player, multiplayer
- Arcade system: System 256

It is the home version of the arcade game. It includes 17 extra characters (33 total) and 4 stages (15 total) over the arcade game, and adds story mode (based on the Seven Devil Chojin and the Golden Mask arcs), tournament mode (4, 8, or 16 characters), 5 vs 5 team mode, survival mode.

Early order includes a full color plastic "Meat" money box.

=== Game modes ===
- Arcade (アーケード)

Single-player 7 stages mode where the users choose one character and must defeat the last boss, which can be Akuma Shogun, Goldman or Benkiman.

- Versus (バーサス)

Head-to-head two players mode where the challenger can select the stage.

- Story (ストーリー)
  - The Seven Devil Chojin chapter (七人の悪魔超人編): "to be continued..."
  - The Gold Mask chapter (黄金のマスク編): "the end"

A 2-part scenario based, single-player mode where the user plays as Suguru (Kinnikuman) and his allies (featuring a near-complete cast revival from the original anime). In the first chapter, Kinnikuman must defeat the six Devil Chojin led by Buffaloman in order to save Meat (ミート). In the second one, Suguru and his fellowship fight versus the Devil Knights to get back the stolen Gold Mask. Depending on the player's choices and his ability to follow the original manga's storyline (who-fight-who), he will be able - or not - to truly complete the mode and to watch the ending credits.

- Tournament (トーナメント)
  - Challenge Tournament (チャレンジ・トーナメント)
  - Muscle Tournament (マッスル・トーナメント)
  - Ultimate Tournament (アルティメット・トーナメント)

The Challenge class is a 4-fighter series where the player has to beat 2 of them to be classified as "S" (Gold), "A" (Silver), "B" (Bronze) rank. Being defeated by one of them will result in a game over with a "D" (purple colored medal) rank. The Muscle class is an 8-fighter series where the player has to beat 3 of them to be classified as "S" (Gold), "A" (Silver), "B" (Bronze) rank. Being defeated by one of them will result in a game over with a "D" (purple colored medal) rank. The Ultimate Tournament is a 16-fighter series where the player has to beat 4 of them to be classified as "S" (Gold), "A" (Silver), "B" (Bronze) rank. Being defeated by one of them will result in a game over with a "D" (purple colored medal) rank.

- Team Battle (団体戦, Dantaisen)
  - Versus Battle (対戦, Taisen)
  - 1P VS CPU
  - CPU VS 2P
  - Watch Battle (観戦, Kansen)

A single, or two-player, 1 on 1 mode where the user choose five characters and have to defeat the other side. The challenger select the stage after each match. Each team can select the same character two times, as long as the double will use the alternate costume (which can be a different character). The "Watch Battle" mode allows the user to watch two CPU controlled characters fighting with each other.

- Survival (サバイバル)

An endurance mode where the player select a character and have to win as much single round (1 minute max) fights as possible.

- Option (オプション)

Various adjustable settings such as autosave feature, rounds number, controller key edit and damage percentage.

== Muscle Grand Prix 2 ==
キン肉マン マッスルグランプリ2 (KINNIKUMAN MUSCLE GRAND PRIX 2)
- Developer: syn Sophia
- Publisher: Banpresto
- Series: Kinnikuman Muscle Grand Prix
- Platform: Arcade
- Release: JP: 21 June 2007
- Genre: Fighting
- Modes: Single-player, multiplayer
- Arcade system: System 256

This addition added 6 new characters.

== Muscle Grand Prix 2 Tokumori ==
キン肉マン マッスルグランプリ2 特盛 (KINNIKUMAN MUSCLE GRAND PRIX 2 特盛)
- Developer: syn Sophia
- Publisher: Namco Bandai Games
- Series: Kinnikuman Muscle Grand Prix
- Platform: PlayStation 2
- Release: JP: 25 September 2008
- Genre: Fighting
- Modes: Single-player, multiplayer
- Arcade system: System 256

It is an expanded version of MGP2.

Extra game mode over the arcade game includes Tournament, Collection, Practice, Special.

In collection, a player can view galleries unlocked by performing certain techniques. Silver medal only unlocks greyscale image, while gold medal unlocks colour image. The type of medal attained is based on how accurately the techniques performed and the stage they are performed in mimic scenes from the anime (for example, silver is given for the correct move, but the wrong outfits or wrong stage, and gold is given for the correct move and the correct outfits in the correct stage).

In special, player can play the NES Kinnikuman games Muscle Tag Match and Scramble for the Throne.

== Characters ==
A black star (★) represents characters who first appear in Muscle Grand Prix MAX. Player 2 costumes are in (brackets). New costumes in Muscle Grand Prix 2 are in "⟨⟩".

=== Justice Chojin ===
==== Legends ====
- Kinnikuman (Kinniku Clan Battle Style) ⟨Scramble for the Throne costume⟩
  - power: 950,000 / height: 185 cm / weight: 90 kg / homeland: Planet Kinniku
  - Finishing Hold: Complete Muscle Spark, Fart Spark (Incomplete Muscle Spark)
- Terryman (2nd Kinnikuman Great) ⟨Buffaloman's arms⟩
  - power: 950,000 / height: 190 cm / weight: 95 kg / homeland: Amarillo, Texas
  - Finishing Hold: Texas Clover Hold, Calf Branding
- Robin Mask (Anime color) ⟨No Armor⟩
  - power: 960,000 / height: 217 cm / weight: 155 kg / homeland: England
  - Finishing Hold: Robin Special, Ropework Tower Bridge
- Warsman (Chloé) ⟨Anime color⟩
  - power: 1,000,000 / height: 210 cm / weight: 150 kg / homeland: Soviet Union
  - Finishing Hold: Pallo Special The End, Double Claw Screw Driver
- Ramenman (Mongolman) ⟨Hooded version (Messiah)⟩ ⟨Anime color⟩
  - power: 970,000 / height: 208 cm / weight: 130 kg / homeland: Henan, China
  - Finishing Hold: Kowloon Wall Drop, Flying Leg Lariat
- Brocken Jr. (Anime color) ⟨No uniform⟩
  - power: 900,000 / height: 195 cm / weight: 90 kg / homeland: Germany
  - Finishing Hold: Red Rain of Berlin, Continuous Red Rain of Berlin
- Wolfman (Black mawashi)
  - power: 800,000 / height: 190 cm / weight: 120 kg / homeland: Tohoku, Japan
  - Finishing Hold: Gasshou Hineri, Nekodamashi
- Pentagon (Black body)
  - power: 700,000 / height: 208 cm / weight: 115 kg / homeland: U.S.A.
  - Finishing Hold: Space Rush, Stop the Time
- Benkiman (Anime version)
  - power: 400,000 / height: ? / weight: ? / homeland: Ancient Inca
  - Finishing Hold: Dreaded Benki Flush, Dreaded Ben...?
- ★Geronimo (Manga color)
  - power: 830,000 / height: 180 cm / weight: 80 kg / homeland: Cherokee Reserves, Oklahoma
  - Finishing Hold: Apache War Cry, Tomohawk Chop Storm
- ★Kinnikuman Soldier (Anime color)
  - power: 1,080,000 / height: ? / weight: ? / homeland: Planet Kinniku
  - Finishing Hold: Napalm Stretch, Ataru's Muscle Spark

==== New Generation ====
- Kinniku Mantaro (Chojin Olympics costume)
  - power: 930,000 / height: 176 cm / weight: 83 kg / homeland: Planet Kinniku
  - Finishing Hold: Muscle Gravity, Muscle Millennium
- Kevin Mask (Black mask and armor)
  - power: 1,170,000 / height: 218 cm / weight: 155 kg / homeland: London, England
  - Finishing Hold: Big Ben Edge, Provocation Toe Kick
- ★Terry the Kid (Ultimate Chojin Tag Arc costume)
  - power: 1,050,000 / height: 190 cm / weight: 86 kg / homeland: Texas
  - Finishing Hold: Texas Clover Hold, Calf Branding
- ★Jade (no helmet)
  - power: 950,000 / height: 183 cm / weight: 93 kg / homeland: Germany
  - Finishing Hold: Double Red Rain of Berlin, Beefcake Hammer
- ★Scarface (Overbody)
  - power: 1,380,000 / height: 200 cm / weight: 137 kg / homeland: Italy
  - Finishing Hold: Ultimate Scar Buster, Hell River Plunge
- ★Check Mate (Black outfit)
  - power: 1,210,000 / height: 221 cm / weight: 190~800 kg / homeland: Monaco
  - Finishing Hold: Grand Slam - Stallion Style Honorable Driver, Grand Slam - Human Desk Drop Bomb
- ★Ilioukhine (Light blue body)
  - power: 1,200,000 / height: 227 cm / weight: 176 kg / homeland: Russia
  - Finishing Hold: The Turbulence, Genetic Storm
- ★Barrierfreeman (Yellow diaper)
  - power: 420,000 / height: 183 cm / weight: 78 kg / homeland: Sweden
  - Finishing Hold: Narayama Backbreaker, Nils' Narayama Backbreaker

=== Devil Choujins ===
==== 7 Devil Choujins Arc ====
- Buffaloman (possessed by Satan version) ⟨No wig⟩
  - power: 10,000,000 / height: 250 cm / weight: 220 kg / homeland: Spain
  - Finishing Hold: Hurricane Mixer "Course of Death", Hurricane Cross Slam
- ★Springman (Gold body)
  - power: 3,200,000 / height: ? / weight: ? / homeland: Greece
  - Finishing Hold: Devil Slinky, Spring Rocket
- ★Stecasse-King (Anime version)
  - power: 2,500,000 / height: ? / weight: ? / homeland: Belgium
  - Finishing Hold: Hell's Symphony, Für Elise
- ★Black Hole (Black and white costume)
  - power: 2,000,000 / height: 201 cm / weight: 420 kg / homeland: Bermuda Triangle
  - Finishing Hold: Black Hole Absorption, Shadow Clone Execution
- ★The Mountain (Blue dogi)
  - power: 500,000 / height: ? / weight: ? / homeland: Everest, Nepal
  - Finishing Hold: Mountain Drop, Full Body Mountain Drop
- ★Mister Khamen (Anime color)
  - power: 1,300,000 / height: ? / weight: ? / homeland: Egypt
  - Finishing Hold: Mummy Package, Mysterious Light Beam
- ★Atlantis (Navy blue)
  - power: 1,450,000 / height: ? / weight: ? / homeland: Australia
  - Finishing Hold: Atlantis Driver, Devil Choujin Blood Bind

==== Golden Mask Arc ====
- Akuma Shogun (Goldman)
  - power: 15,000,000 / height: 220 cm / weight: 162 kg / homeland: Celestial Realm
  - Finishing Hold: Hell's Guillotine, Hell's Double Play
- Ashuraman (Dream Chojin Tag Arc version & manga color) ⟨Stolen arms version⟩
  - power: 10,000,000 / height: 203 cm / weight: 200 kg / homeland: Demon Realm
  - Finishing Hold: Improved Ashura Buster, Ashura Infinity Power
- Sunshine (Dream Chojin Tag Arc version (New Sunshine))
  - power: 7,000,000 / height: 300 cm / weight: 1000 kg / homeland: Peru (Nazca)
  - Finishing Hold: Demon Realm Hell Tour, Cursed Roller
- The Ninja (Anime color)
  - power: 3,600,000 / height: 190 cm / weight: 115 kg / homeland: Japan
  - Finishing Hold: Goka Urin no Jutsu (Fiery Feather Ring Jutsu), Kumoito Shibari (Binding Spider Web)
- ★Junkman (Anime color)
  - power: 6,000,000 / height: ? / weight: ? / homeland: Australia
  - Finishing Hold: Blood Bath Hell, Double Face Junk Crush
- ★Planetman (Anime color)
  - power: 5,000,000 / height: ? / weight: ? / homeland: North Pole
  - Finishing Hold: Planetary Alignment, Grand Cross
- ★Sneagator (Light brown)
  - power: 4,000,000 / height: ? / weight: ? / homeland: Congo region
  - Finishing Hold: Hell's Space Walk "Ultra C", Hell's Seal

=== Muscle Grand Prix 2 characters ===
- Kinnikuman Super Phoenix (Purple face lines)
  - power: 100,000,000 / height: 190 cm / weight: 114 kg / homeland: Planet Kinniku
  - Finishing Hold: True Muscle Revenger, Raging Ox
- Kinnikuman Zebra ("Zangyaku Chojin" Mode)
  - power: 100,000,000 / height: 220 cm / weight: 154 kg / homeland: Namibia
  - Finishing Hold: Saint Muscle Punch, Muscle Inferno
- Kinnikuman Mariposa (Anime color)
  - power: 100,000,000 / height: 185 cm / weight: 100 kg / homeland: Mexico
  - Finishing Hold: Phony Muscle Revenger, Aztec Rush
- Kinnikuman Big Body (Anime color)
  - power: 100,000,000 / height: 245 cm / weight: 215 kg / homeland: Canada
  - Finishing Hold: Muscle Impact, Maple Leaf Clutch

+ The Hell Missionaries

- Neptuneman (Anime color)
  - power: 28,000,000 / height: 240 cm / weight: 210 kg / homeland: England
  - Finishing Hold: Cross Bomber, Double Leg Suplex
- Big the Budou (Anime color, Neptune King)
  - power: 50,000,000 / height: 290 cm / weight: 320 kg / homeland: Japan
  - Finishing Hold: Megaton King Drop, Cross Bomber

== Stage list ==
- Beverly Park (美波理(ビバリー)公園, Bibarii Kouen)
- Five Story Ring (五重のリング, Go-e no Ringu)
- Tokyo Tower Special Ring (東京タワー特設リング, Tōkyō Tawā Tokusetsu Ringu)
- Hidden Pond in Ueno Park (上野公園不忍池, Ueno Kouen Shinobazuno Ike)
- Demon Womb (デーモン・ウゥーム, Demon Wuum)
- Amusement Park (遊園地, Yuuenchi)
- Denen Colosseum (田園コロシアム, Denen Koroshiamu)
- Chichibu Mountain Range (秩父連山, Chichibu Renzan)
- Nippon Budokan (日本武道館, Nippon Budoukan)
- Japanese Alps (日本アルプス, Nippon Arupusu)
- Tournament Mountain (トーナメント・マウンテン, Tōnamento Maunten)

Muscle Grand Prix MAX

- Tottori Sand Dunes (鳥取砂丘, Tottori Sakyuu)
- Hokkaidō UFO Landing Zone (北海道UFO発着所, Hokkaidou UFO Hatchakujo)
- Korakuen Baseball Stadium (後楽園球場, Kourakuen Kyuujou)
- Spirit World Pocket (霊界ポケット, Reikai Poketto)

Muscle Grand Prix 2

- Osaka Castle (大阪城, Oosaka-jou)
- Cube Ring (立方体リング, Rippoutai Ringu)
- Fist of Heracles (ヘラクレスの拳, Herakuresu no Ken)

== Theme list ==
- Opening Theme: Honoo no Kinnikuman (炎のキン肉マン, Blazing Kinnikuman) by Akira Kushida
- Ending Theme: Kinnikuman Go Fight! (キン肉マンGo Fight!) by Akira Kushida
- Insert Theme: Miracle of Muscle Docking. Plays if the players use certain characters against each other from Kinnikuman.
- Insert Theme: Hustle Muscle. Plays if the players use certain characters against each other in Kinnikuman Nisei.

== Reception ==
MGP Max was rated 32/40 (Silver rank) by Weekly Famitsu.

== Voice cast ==
- Akira Kamiya as Kinnikuman
- Konami Yoshida as Meat-kun, Silver Mask, Choujin Child
- Hideyuki Tanaka as Terryman, Springman, Planetman
- Daisuke Gōri as Robin Mask, Black Hole, Ashuraman
- Hideyuki Hori as Warsman
- Kenichi Ono as Ramenman/Mongolman, Specialman
- Yasuhiko Kawazu as Brocken Jr., Wolfman, Barrierfreeman (Nils)
- Mahito Ohba as Geronimo, Planet Kinniku Soldier
- Kenji Nomura as Buffaloman, Scarface
- Ryōichi Tanaka as Mister Kamen
- Issei Futamata as Benkiman, SteCase King, Sneagator, Silverman
- Masaharu Satō as Sunshine, Mariposa, Chairman Harabote, Kinniku Clan Ancestor
- Kōji Totani as Pentagon, Announcer, Canadianman
- Tetsu Inada as Akuma Shogun
- Hiroaki Hirata as The Ninja
- Kazuhiko Kishino as Atlantis, Junkman, Neptuneman, Doctor
- Yonehiko Kitagawa as The Mountain, Big the Budo, Golden Mask, Kami-sama
- Shigeru Chiba as Kinniku Ataru
- Michihiro Ikemizu as Super Phoenix
- Hirohiko Kakegawa as Zebra
- Masato Hirano as Big Body
- Masaya Onosaka as Kinniku Mantarou
- Ryōtarō Okiayu as Kevin Mask
- Toshiyuki Morikawa as Terry the Kid
- Kenji Nojima as Jade
- Bin Shimada as Barrierfreeman (Jiijoman)
- Kouichi Toochika as Check Mate, Ilioukhine
- Kōzō Shioya as King Kinniku
- Sanae Takagi as Bibinba
- Naoki Tatsuta as Nakano-san/Narration
- Lenne Hardt as System Voice (Game Announcer)

== See also ==
- Kinnikuman characters
- Kinnikuman Generations
