= WWF WrestleMania 2000 (video game) =

1999 professional wrestling video game

- European Nintendo 64 cover art featuring Big Show, Mankind, The Rock, Triple H, and The Undertaker
- Developers: AKI Corporation (N64); Natsume Co., Ltd. (GBC)
- Publishers: WW: THQ; JP: Asmik Ace
- Directors: Geta-San (N64); Shinji Kyogoku (GBC)
- Composers: Kouji Niikura (N64); Yukie Sugawara (N64); Iku Mizutani (GBC)
- Platforms: Nintendo 64; Game Boy Color
- Release: Nintendo 64: NA: November 18, 1999; UK: December 10, 1999; JP: September 15, 2000; Game Boy Color: NA: November 18, 1999; EU: November 1999
- Genre: Fighting
- Modes: Single player, multiplayer

WWF WrestleMania 2000 is a professional wrestling video game released in 1999 on the Nintendo 64 (N64) console. It was based on the World Wrestling Federation's (WWF, now WWE) annual pay-per-view, WrestleMania. Despite the fact that this game is based upon WrestleMania 2000, the game was released five months prior (and four months prior on the Game Boy Color) to the actual PPV itself, therefore resulting in the game using the stage design from the 1999 event, WrestleMania XV, instead. Released at the height of the WWF's Attitude Era, WrestleMania 2000 was the first WWF game released by THQ. The WWF ended its long relationship with Acclaim Entertainment after witnessing the video game success of its competitor, World Championship Wrestling (WCW), on behalf of THQ. WrestleMania 2000 shares its game engine with the Japan-only release Virtual Pro Wrestling 2: Ōdō Keishō.

The game would be followed with a sequel WWF No Mercy in 2000.

== Gameplay ==
WWF WrestleMania 2000 uses the exact same game engine previously seen in WCW/nWo Revenge, which released the previous year. More than 50 WWF wrestlers were included in the game, and, with the exception of existing superstars' move sets, all of them can be freely edited to the player's liking. Using the same system, the Create-a-Wrestler mode is extensive. Players are able to create a highly detailed wrestler with an extensive library of wrestling moves, many of which are carried over from previous AKI games in the series. Usual WWF modes such as Royal Rumble and King of the Ring modes are included, along with a pay-per-view mode, enabling the player to either recreate or create unique pay-per-views with television-style features. Players can also create up to eight championship belts and put them up for contest in Exhibition mode.

The "Road To WrestleMania" mode places the player on the long road to WWF glory. Starting out as a rookie, the player gradually works their way up the ladder and earns opportunities to gain various WWF titles, win various tournaments, be challenged by various wrestlers and ultimately main-event at WrestleMania 2000. Although the story mode is long and extensive in the number of matches in which it pits the player, there are no branching storylines and if the player loses a match, it is simply recorded as a loss in their win–loss record. Throughout the mode, when the player wins a championship, they are expected to defend their title in future in-game pay-per-view events. This rule applies to all championships that the player currently holds. For example, if one holds the WWF European Championship, WWF Intercontinental Championship, WWF Tag Team Championship, and the WWF Championship, the player must defend all four titles during one single pay-per-view event.

There are often feuds at different parts in the storyline, occasionally with one wrestler calling out another wrestler in the ring. Also, feuding wrestlers often interrupt matches, helping the opponent. However, the season continues whether or not the player wins or loses their matches. If the player progresses through a winning season with a created wrestler and then starts a new season as a new created wrestler, the first character will still be used in season mode.

Many wrestlers have their signature taunts, such as Stone Cold Steve Austin flipping off an opponent or Mr. Ass mooning another wrestler. Also, by pressing in a different direction on the joystick, a different taunt is performed. Rotating the joystick counter clock wise results in the player mimicking his opponent's taunt.

== Features ==
The Rock prepares to execute his finisher, the Rock Bottom, on Ken Shamrock.

The game features several arenas at which WWF held events in 1998 and 1999. There are also arenas based on each WWF television show, such as Sunday Night Heat and Raw is War, as well as other pay-per-view venues of the time.

This was the first WWF game to allow players to freely edit their favorite superstars (i.e. putting Stone Cold Steve Austin in The Rock's trunks) and also be able to create and modify alternate attires for each wrestler, as each character in the game has four templates that can be individually edited and switched between using the left and right 'C' buttons. If the player makes changes that they do not like, a default button resets the edited costume into the original costume for that slot. It was also the first THQ produced Nintendo 64 title to feature a "Create a Wrestler" mode.

In addition to the numerous default and secret characters, several other realistic likenesses and movesets in the create-a-wrestler mode make it possible to add even more characters. Some examples include The Road Warriors, Hulk Hogan, Taka Michinoku, and Davey Boy Smith. Also, some taunts and move sets were carried over from WCW/nWo Revenge, allowing the player to create and include WCW wrestlers such as Goldberg, Kevin Nash, Scott Hall, Diamond Dallas Page, and Macho Man Randy Savage. The drawback to the create-a-wrestler mode, however, is the fact that there are limited slots available due to limited memory space, but players can edit the individual templates in the character models to include four different characters with separate appearances which allows a great deal of flexibility. However, wrestlers in the same template are obliged to have the same moves.

Additionally, by making two superstars' entrance music the same, if they are a real-life tag team they will be introduced as such; for instance, matching the Road Dogg and Mr. Ass's themes would lead to them being introduced together as the New Age Outlaws before a tag team match.

Also, some features are implemented in the game that were not seen in WCW/nWo Revenge, such as a cage match and a First Blood mode. Reversals and counter moves were also expanded upon and made much more commonplace.

A normally non-selectable "Computer Intelligence" mode can also be accessed using a GameShark code, as well as WCW and nWo ring aprons.

This game's roster is notable compared to both the preceding WWF Attitude and its successor WWF SmackDown!. It is the only THQ WWF game where Droz, Chaz (Mosh), Thrasher and Jeff Jarrett are playable, due to Droz suffering a career-ending injury and the remaining names leaving the company the same year. It is also the only game in which Scott Taylor and Brian Christopher are featured in their earlier "Too Much" gimmick, as well as the only game where Shawn Stasiak's short-lived gimmick as "Meat" is playable (he would soon after leave for WCW and return to the company following the company's purchase in 2001) and The Blue Meanie was also his only game. It is one of only three games in which Michael Hayes is playable (the others being WCW Wrestling from a decade prior and WWE Legends of WrestleMania less than a decade later).

The N64 version of WrestleMania 2000 features six active female wrestlers on the original unlocked roster, the first time that a WWF video game had more than one immediately available to play. The only prior WWF game with multiple active female wrestlers was the console version of WWF Attitude, whose three female wrestlers all had to be unlocked.

== Roster ==
=== Male wrestlers ===
- Al Snow
- Big Boss Man
- Big Show
- Bradshaw
- Brian Christopher
- Chaz
- Chris Jericho
- Christian
- D'Lo Brown
- Droz
- Edge
- Farooq
- Gangrel
- Gerald Brisco
- Godfather
- Hardcore Holly
- Jeff Hardy
- Jeff Jarrett
- Kane
- Ken Shamrock
- Mankind
- Mark Henry
- Matt Hardy
- Meat
- Michael Hayes
- Mideon
- Mr. Ass
- Mr. McMahon
- Pat Patterson
- Prince Albert
- Road Dogg
- Scott Taylor
- Shane McMahon
- Steve Austin
- Steve Blackman
- Test
- The Blue Meanie
- The Rock
- Thrasher
- Triple H
- The Undertaker
- Val Venis
- Viscera
- X-Pac

=== Female wrestlers ===
- Chyna
- Debra
- Ivory
- Jacqueline
- Terri Runnels
- Tori

=== Unlockables ===
All characters are unlocked by meeting certain conditions in the "Road to WrestleMania" mode:

- Cactus Jack - Defend the Hardcore Title 3 times
- Dude Love - Win the King of the Ring tournament and then win the WWF Title at SummerSlam
- Jerry "The King" Lawler - At the beginning of WrestleMania alongside Jim Ross
- Jim Ross - At the beginning of WrestleMania alongside Jerry "The King" Lawler
- Paul Bearer - Play one month as The Undertaker
- Shawn Michaels - Win the WWF title match at WrestleMania and he will challenge you to a match
- Stephanie McMahon - Play one month as Test

== Advertising and release ==
In a TV commercial promoting the game, The Rock becomes furious at how the game includes his name, likeness, and move-set. At the end of the ad, he threatens to shove copies of the game up Santa Claus's "candy-ass".

Some copies of WWF WrestleMania 2000 shipped with a special card containing four holograms of the in game action, such as a wrestler's entrance or finishing move.

== Reception ==
Reception

Aggregate score
Aggregator	Score	
Aggregator	GBC	N64
GameRankings	64%	84%

Review scores
Publication	Score	
Publication	GBC	N64
AllGame	2/5	4.5/5
CNET Gamecenter	N/A	7/10
Electronic Gaming Monthly	6/10	8.25/10 (Note: Two critics of Electronic Gaming Monthly gave the Nintendo 64 version each a score of 8.5/10, and two others gave it each a score of 8/10.)
Famitsu	N/A	28/40
Game Informer	7.25/10	9/10
GameFan	N/A	100%
GameRevolution	N/A	C−
GameSpot	N/A	7.1/10
IGN	6/10	8.9/10
N64 Magazine	N/A	90%
Next Generation	N/A	4/5
Nintendo Power	N/A	8/10
The Sydney Morning Herald	N/A	4.5/5

The N64 version of the game received "favorable" reviews, while the Game Boy Color version received "mixed" reviews, according to video game review aggregator GameRankings. Daniel Erickson of NextGen said of the former console version: "Wonderful gameplay even overshadows the lack of quality audio." Stuart Clarke of The Sydney Morning Herald said of the same console version: "The strong gameplay will even appeal to non-wrestling fans and with up to four people able to fight simultaneously it's sure to be a popular party game." In Japan, Famitsu gave the same console version a score of 28 out of 40.

In one GamePro review, The Enforcer called the Nintendo 64 version "the best wrestling title this year. [...] The king of the ring has arrived." (Note: GamePro gave the Nintendo 64 version two 4.5/5 scores for graphics and control, 3.5/5 for sound, and 5/5 for fun factor in one review.) In another review, The D-Pad Destroyer called it "a very fun game, especially for four players, and its ease of play will endear it to hardcore wrestling fans who don't want to spend months studying a list of moves. It may be new, and it may have the WWF, but in the end, it's just the revenge of Revenge." (Note: GamePro gave the Nintendo 64 version 4/5 for graphics, 3.5/5 for sound, and two 4.5/5 scores for control and fun factor in another review.)

In the final edition of Nintendo Power, WWF WrestleMania 2000 was ranked number 223 in a list of the best games released on Nintendo consoles, namely for its massive roster and positive gameplay ability. The game sold more than one million units by January 2000.

During the Academy of Interactive Arts & Sciences' 3rd Annual Interactive Achievement Awards, the Nintendo 64 version was a finalist for the "Console Fighting Game of the Year" award, which was ultimately given to Soulcalibur.

== See also ==
- Virtual Pro Wrestling
- List of licensed wrestling video games
- List of fighting games
