= Ultimate Fighting Championship (video game) =

2000 video game

- North American PlayStation cover art, featuring Tito Ortiz
- Developers: Anchor (Note: Ported to PlayStation by Opus.); Fluid Studios (GBC)
- Publishers: NA: Crave Entertainment; EU: Crave/Ubi Soft; JP: Capcom
- Platforms: Dreamcast, PlayStation, Game Boy Color
- Release: Dreamcast: NA: August 30, 2000; UK: December 8, 2000; JP: January 25, 2001; PlayStation: NA: November 14, 2000; JP: January 25, 2001; UK: April 6, 2001; Game Boy Color: NA: November 24, 2000; UK: March 2, 2001
- Genre: Sports
- Modes: Single player, multiplayer

Ultimate Fighting Championship is a set of two video games based on the Ultimate Fighting Championship mixed martial arts promotion. One version was released for home consoles by developer Anchor for Sega Dreamcast in August 2000. This version was ported to PlayStation by Opus in November. A separate version was released for Game Boy Color by developer Fluid Studios in November of the same year. The game was published by Crave Entertainment in North America, by Ubi Soft in Europe, and by Capcom for Dreamcast and PlayStation versions in Japan.

== Fighters ==
- Mikey Burnett
- Mark Coleman
- Gary Goodridge
- Jeremy Horn
- Matt Hughes
- Eugene Jackson
- Tsuyoshi Kosaka
- Tim Lajcik
- Chuck Liddell
- Guy Mezger
- Pat Miletich
- Tito Ortiz
- Kevin Randleman
- Marco Ruas
- Bas Rutten
- Pedro Rizzo
- Andre Roberts
- Frank Shamrock
- Maurice Smith
- Evan Tanner
- Ron Waterman
- Pete Williams

== Reception ==
Reception

Aggregate score
| Aggregator | Score | | |
| Aggregator | Dreamcast | GBC | PS |
|---|---|---|---|
| Metacritic | 88/100 | N/A | 53/100 |

Review scores
| Publication | Score | | |
| Publication | Dreamcast | GBC | PS |
|---|---|---|---|
| AllGame | 2/5 | 1.5/5 | N/A |
| CNET Gamecenter | 8/10 | N/A | 6/10 |
| Electronic Gaming Monthly | 6.67/10 (Note: In Electronic Gaming Monthly's review of the Dreamcast version, one critic gave it a score of 6/10, and the rest gave it each a score of 7/10.) | 2/10 | 3.5/10 |
| EP Daily | 9.5/10 | N/A | 7/10 |
| Eurogamer | 9/10 | N/A | N/A |
| Famitsu | 32/40 | N/A | 24/40 |
| Game Informer | N/A | N/A | 7/10 |
| GameFan | 90% (Note: In GameFan's viewpoint of the Dreamcast version, three critics gave it each a score of 88, 90, and 91.) | N/A | N/A |
| GameRevolution | B+ | N/A | N/A |
| GameSpot | 9.2/10 | N/A | 2.5/10 |
| GameSpy | (SP) 89% (PDC) 5/10 | N/A | N/A |
| IGN | 9.1/10 | 3/10 | 7.7/10 |
| Next Generation | 5/5 | N/A | 2/5 |
| Official U.S. PlayStation Magazine | N/A | N/A | 2.5/5 |

The Dreamcast version received "generally favorable reviews", just two points shy of "universal acclaim", while the PlayStation version received "mixed" reviews, according to the review aggregation website Metacritic. Dan Morris of NextGen said of the former console version in its October 2000 issue, "No-holds-barred fighting gets a world-class Dreamcast translation, with gameplay that's both lifelike and exciting." Five issues later, however, Daniel Erickson said in his review of the latter console version, "If Ultimate Fighting Championship had first appeared on PlayStation, we might have been more impressed with its originality and more likely to overlook some of its glaring flaws. After the excellent Dreamcast version, however, all we can see is how much worse this PlayStation outing is." Edge, however, gave the former console version four out of ten, saying, "Lacking in the humour of WWF's absurd pantomime, Crave's title occupies an alien middle ground that can be difficult to digest, and even with its supposed plethora of moves, it's hard to develop any attachment. While it's obvious why shortsighted codeshops will never go wrong appealing to the lowest common denominator, you have to wonder whether titles based on moral ground as shaky as this are actually worthy of featuring anything innovative anyway." In Japan, Famitsu gave it a score of 32 out of 40 for the former console version, and 24 out of 40 for the latter one. Four-Eyed Dragon of GamePro said of the Dreamcast version in one review, "Getting bruised has never been so much fun. The fights get intense and the adrenaline pumps tenfold, whether you're playing the computer or a friend. This is the ultimate fighting champion." In another GamePro review, The D-Pad Destroyer said of the same console version, "Going out on a limb here, UFC is absolutely the best fighting/wrestling game yet. When you put aside the pomp and circumstance of wrestling and the beat-mania button mashing of games like Tekken, you end up with Ultimate Fighting Championship to show you where the real meat is." (Note: GamePro gave the Dreamcast version three 5/5 scores for graphics, sound, and fun factor, and 4.5/5 for control in both reviews.)

The Dreamcast version was a runner-up for the "Best Dreamcast Game" and "Best Sports Game (Alternative)" awards at GameSpot's Best and Worst of 2000 Awards, both of which went to NFL 2K1 and Tony Hawk's Pro Skater 2. Conversely, the PlayStation version was nominated for the "Most Disappointing Game" and "Worst Game" awards, both of which went to Shenmue and Spirit of Speed 1937; the staff dubbed the game "a pixellated, stiffly playing abomination." In 2001, the Dreamcast version was a finalist for the Academy of Interactive Arts & Sciences' Console Fighting award, which ultimately went to Dead or Alive 2. The same console version won the award for "Best Console Fighting Game" at The Electric Playground's Blister Awards 2000.

== See also ==
- List of fighting games
