= Def Jam: Fight for NY =

2004 video game

- Developers: AKI Corporation; EA Canada
- Publisher: EA Games
- Producers: Josh Holmes; Hideyuki Iwashita; Lauren Wirtzer
- Programmers: Jorge Freitas; Hiro Abe
- Artists: Daryl Anselmo; Hiroya Tamura
- Writers: Mark Sawers; Douglas Barber
- Platforms: GameCube, PlayStation 2, Xbox, PlayStation Portable
- Release: NA: September 21, 2004; AU: September 24, 2004; EU: October 1, 2004; JP: February 24, 2005 (PS2); PlayStation Portable: NA: August 29, 2006; AU: August 31, 2006; EU: September 1, 2006
- Genre: Fighting
- Modes: Single-player, multiplayer

Def Jam: Fight for NY is a 3D fighting video game developed by AKI Corporation and EA Canada and published by EA Games. It was released for the GameCube, PlayStation 2, and Xbox on September 21, 2004. The game is the second main installment in EA's Def Jam-licensed hip-hop video game series, and the direct sequel to Def Jam Vendetta. It was ported to the PlayStation Portable under the title Def Jam Fight for NY: The Takeover in 2006, and was followed up by Def Jam: Icon in 2007.

== Gameplay ==
The game features several rappers, including Lil' Kim, Snoop Dogg, Method Man & Redman, Slick Rick, Memphis Bleek, Lil' Flip, Scarface, Ghostface Killah, Fat Joe, Mobb Deep, Ice-T, Xzibit, Capone-N-Noreaga, Ludacris, Crazy Legs, Busta Rhymes, Bubba Sparxxx and Sean Paul as well as the voices and likeness of other celebrities, such as Henry Rollins, Christopher Judge, Carmen Electra, Baby Chris, Jacob Arabo and Kimora Lee Simmons.

The gameplay is expanded from the original game, which was primarily a wrestling game. Fighters can choose one, two, or three of five fighting styles. The fighting styles are Streetfighting, Kickboxing, Martial Arts, Wrestling and Submissions.

Additionally, Def Jam Fight for NY emphasizes the use of the game's various environments and the surrounding crowd to cause damage. Tossing the opponent against barriers gives fighters an opportunity to inflict massive damage to their opponent by slamming them into the wall headfirst, ramming a door or gate in their face, or using other features of the environment. The crowd will shove a fighter back into combat if he is thrown into them or gets too close, sometimes holding a fighter and leaving them open to attack. Some spectators carry weapons, and will offer them to the fighters, or even attack a fighter if they are held by a nearby onlooker.

Momentum is gained by successfully performing moves, countering, and taunting the opponent. The rate at which momentum is gained is affected by the fighter's Charisma stat, which like other stats varies between fighters. Created fighters can set their own charisma with a combination of clothes, tattoos, and jewelry; the more expensive, the better. A fighter with a good set of clothes, extensive tattoos, or laden with jewellery can often fill their momentum meter in just a few moves.

When the momentum meter is full, a fighter can activate it, which results in a Blazin' Taunt. In this state, the fighter is said to be "Blazin", and can pull off a Blazin' Move, a powerful and brutal attack personalized for each character. A created character can learn every single Blazin' Move in the game, but can only have up to four usable at any one time.

Though the game focuses on mixed fighting styles, the only way to win a fight is through Knock Out or Submission. A character can be made to submit by putting them into submission holds until the health bar of a single body part is depleted.

Knock Out is achieved through a unique health bar used in the game. Health is composed of two bars, the first bar representing a fighter's consciousness and ability to fight (displayed as an opaque light green), while underneath it is the fighter's physical wellness bar (displayed as a semi transparent dark green). With every hit, a fighter's consciousness will fall quicker than their physical wellness. However, whenever a fighter is not losing health, their consciousness meter will recover up to the maximum current physical wellness. When a fighter's consciousness is lowered to a very low point, the entire health bar will turn red. This indicates that the fighter is in danger of being knocked out. Knocking out an opponent in danger requires the use of strong hits, Blazin' Moves, and environmental moves such as slamming an opponent into the wall, or achieving a double team move with a crowd member, or using a weapon (like a pipe, a bottle, a wooden bat, a shovel, etc.). It is possible to knock out an opponent by beating down their health while their physical wellness remains very high. As a fight wears on, physical wellness will eventually fall low enough that when a fighter's consciousness recovers to the physical limit, it is still too low to turn green. This is sometimes known as permanent danger, meaning a fighter is permanently in danger of being knocked out.

Additionally, each fighting style has a unique way to knock out opponents in danger: streetfighters can attack with a strong punch; wrestlers can perform a strong grapple; kickboxers can complete a kick-combo; submission experts can force the enemy to submit with grapples; and martial artists can perform flying attacks.

=== Story Mode ===
The game's story mode follows the narrative of a player-created fighter, who is fighting his way through the New York Underground. Winning matches rewards the player with cash, which can be used in shops to buy clothes which include famous clothes lines such as Reebok, Phat Farm, Air Jordan, Sean John and many other clothing lines. As well as clothes, the fighter can get haircuts, tattoos, and jewelry from Jacob "The Jeweler" Arabo, as well as Development points, which can be used at the local gym, run by Henry Rollins, to increase the character's skills, or to purchase and set up new Blazin' Moves and up to two additional fighting styles.

Winning matches unlocks clubs and the fighters defeated, as well as their Blazin' Move, and often the jewelry they may wear. Created characters can have the jewelry of Sean Paul, Crack (Fat Joe), Xzibit, Crazy Legs, Lil' Flip, Def Jam Recordings, Roc-A-Fella Records, State Property, and many others (except for some particular signature pieces such as the medallions worn by Flavor Flav or modify it like Ghostface Killah's Sun God Plate Gold and Diamond piece), the fighters may be used in Battle Mode, while their moves and jewelry may be purchased and used by the player.

=== Characters ===
The game features 69 playable characters, including real-life hip hop artists signed to Def Jam at the time, as well as original characters and the player-created fighter.

D-Mob's Crew	Crow's Crew	Circuit Fighters	
Capone; Comp; D-Mob; Erick Sermon; Flavor Flav; Freeway; Ghostface Killah; Henry Rollins; Joe Budden; Kimora Lee Simmons; Ludacris; Memphis Bleek; Method Man (as Blaze); N.O.R.E.; Redman (as Doc); Shawnna; Scarface; Sticky Fingaz; WC	Baby Chris; David Banner; Bless; Bone Crusher; Bubba Sparxxx; Busta Rhymes (as Magic); Carmen Electra; Crazy Legs; Elephant Man; Fam-Lay; Fat Joe (as Crack); Havoc; Ice-T; Lil' Kim; Lil' Flip; Mack 10; Omar Epps (as O.E.); Prodigy; Sean Paul; Slick Rick; Snoop Dogg (as Crow); Trejo; Warren G; Xzibit	Bo; Chiang; Cindy J; Cruz; Dan G; House; Jacob; Jervis; Lauren; Manny; Masa; Meca; Nyne	Pockets; Rome; Santos; Shaniqua; Skull; Snowman; Solo; Starks; Stingray; Super; Teck; Trick

== Story ==
The game takes place immediately after Def Jam Vendetta. D-Mob (Chris Judge) is arrested by NYPD cops Starks and Jervis and placed in the back of their cop car when an SUV hits it, causing it to flip over. D-Mob crawls out of the wreckage and boards the SUV as Jervis catches a glimpse of the suspect before passing out. He later describes his appearance to Lauren. The suspect becomes the game's protagonist, nicknamed "The Hero".

Taking D-Mob back to his safehouse, the Hero is introduced to Blaze (Method Man) and Sticky Fingaz, and is conscripted into D-Mob's gang. The Hero builds a reputation for winning numerous fights and clubs for D-Mob, and is given his own safehouse. The Hero hooks up with one of four female fighters (Cindy J, Kimora Lee, Lil' Kim and Shawnna), after getting into a fight with their boyfriend, Nyne. After winning a match against Ice-T, D-Mob's crew are approached by his rival, Crow (Snoop Dogg), and his crew: Magic (Busta Rhymes), Crack (Fat Joe), and Trejo (Danny Trejo). Crow announces he is accepting fighters in return for more cash, losing D-Mob several clubs and fighters, one of them WC who was trusted by Blaze. Later, Carmen Electra and the Hero take notice of each other, getting into a fight with his girlfriend. The winner becomes the Hero's new girlfriend with mixed results.

Moving against Crow, D-Mob arranges a match for Blaze to fight Crack, but Blaze loses. After the Hero beats many of Crow's fighters, Crow proposes a winner-take-all match between Crack and D-Mob's "best man". Infuriated that the Hero was picked over him, Sticky storms off and later joins Crow. After the Hero wins a match against Crack, he, Blaze, and D-Mob celebrate in D-Mob's limousine, where the Hero is given a pendant and welcomed into the family. Crow's gang (Trejo, Magic and Sticky) attempts a drive-by shooting, causing a crash. Uninjured, the Hero chases them to a subway station, where he fights and potentially kills Trejo while the rest escape. Returning to the limo, a critically injured D-Mob gets the Hero and Blaze to leave him behind as police arrive.

Following D-Mob's arrest, Blaze, the Hero and their remaining crew, beat many of Crow's fighters and take back several clubs. A 2-on-2 fight was then arranged in a car workshop where The Hero, his girlfriend, and Blaze attends. Magic tries to take the girlfriend away but The Hero steps in and Magic challenges him to a fight. The Hero was given a choice to fight with Ice-T or O.E. with one of them joins the crew if The Hero wins all the fights. After the fight, The Hero teases Magic about losing the SUV prize. Following the fight against Lil' Flip, Magic confronts The Hero to stay away from Crow's clubs and a fight ensues against the two in the parking lot.

As his empire is chipped away, Crow makes multiple attempts to threaten and convince the Hero into quitting or joining his crew, to no initial avail. Crow resorts to kidnapping the Hero's girlfriend, blackmailing him to retake every club he has earned for D-Mob, or else he will murder her; her death being inevitable if the Hero tells anyone the real reason he switched sides. The Hero wins back Crow's clubs, turning his friends against him in the process. As a last resort, Blaze hires a fighter from Baltimore named Teck to defeat The Hero in a scrapyard, however, Teck was defeated.

When the Hero wins a final match against Doc, a distraught Blaze angrily takes D-Mob's pendant from The Hero. Crow tells the Hero he has one final task for him, having him taken to a scrapyard, where Blaze is brutally beaten by Magic, with the Hero ordered to murder him. The Hero refuses, turning against Crow's crew and hitting WC in the process, with Crack and Magic defeated by the Hero and an injured Blaze. Magic tells The Hero that his girlfriend is being held at an abandoned factory, and that Crow always intended to kill her. The Hero and Blaze reach the factory, where Sticky is keeping the Hero's girlfriend hostage. Sticky sets the building on fire, and is killed in the ensuing fight with the Hero. Escaping with his unconscious girlfriend, the Hero and Blaze decide things have gone too far, and set out to confront Crow.

Confronting Crow at his headquarters, the Hero is supported by the remainder of D-Mob's crew, having his name cleared by Blaze. As a fight breaks out between both crews, the Hero corners Crow at his office, getting into a brief standoff with him. Magic appears from behind with a gun pressed against the Hero's head but does not pull the trigger; he instead hands the gun to the Hero and leaves. The Hero initially decides that the cowering Crow is not worth killing. However, Crow attacks him in a rage, and the ensuing fight ends with the Hero throwing Crow out of a window to fall to his death. His reputation cleared, the Hero takes a minute to reflect as Blaze gives him back his pendant.

== GameCube version ==
There are features exclusive to PS2 and Xbox that are missing from the GameCube version. The player is restricted to having one voice for the main character - as opposed to the six found in other versions. Eight of the 28 available music tracks are missing. The GameCube's hardware lacks the light blur effect that permeates on the characters and arenas. Furthermore, certain 3 or 4 player arenas have reduced crowds due to storage limitations imposed by the console's optical disc format.

== Development ==
Josh Holmes, the producer from EA Canada wanted to improve on Def Jam Vendetta. The research they have done shows that veteran gamers were familiar with the game control system yet new players were intimidated by the complexity that has been used since WCW vs. nWo: World Tour that first appeared on the Nintendo 64. The team decided to simplify the controls and make them more intuitive: "We found that straight one-on-one fighting tended to get stale over time, no matter how polished the fighting engine was". The team added secondary elements like crowds, weapons and interactive environments for the player to use as a weapon. Lastly, Holmes went on to say that individual players prefer to use their own tactics, so different classes has been implemented in unique ways to achieve a KO: "The overall focus of the fighting system is fun, over-the-top action rather than a simulation of technical fighting".

The create-a-fighter mode, a feature lacking in Def Jam Vendetta, has been incorporated into the sequel as a part of the Story Mode. Holmes explains that with other successful fighting games, the convention of a sequel is to add complexity to the control system, multiplayer focus to the exclusion of all else, shallow single player, limited character customization and having a gameplay that's skewed towards the hardcore gamer: "Probably the most common that's typical in fighting games like the first game is that it's empty and devoid of people. Inevitably, there's nothing going on except it's just you and your opponent. So they turned the concept on its head by filling the gap to make the fighting game more interactive and less predictable in order to keep it fresh and accessible for beginners and veterans alike".

== Reception ==
Scores & Awards

Aggregate score
Aggregator	Score		
Aggregator	GameCube	PS2	Xbox
Metacritic	84/100	83/100	84/100

Review scores
Publication	Score		
Publication	GameCube	PS2	Xbox
Electronic Gaming Monthly	8.67 / 10	8.67 / 10	8.67 / 10
Eurogamer	N/A	N/A	6 / 10
Famitsu	N/A	31 / 40	N/A
Game Informer	8.75 / 10	8.75 / 10	8.75 / 10
GamePro	4/5	4/5	4/5
GameRevolution	B	B	B
GameSpot	8.7 / 10	8.7 / 10	8.7 / 10
GameSpy	4/5	4/5	4/5
GameZone	9 / 10	9 / 10	9 / 10
IGN	8.7 / 10	8.7 / 10	8.7 / 10
Nintendo Power	3.8 / 5	N/A	N/A
Official U.S. PlayStation Magazine	N/A	4.5/5	N/A
Official Xbox Magazine (US)	N/A	N/A	8.4 / 10
Maxim	8 / 10	8 / 10	8 / 10
The Sydney Morning Herald	4/5	4/5	4/5

Award
Publication	Award
E3	Game Critics Awards: Best Fighting Game (2004)

The game sold over a million copies and received largely positive reviews. GameSpot and IGN gave it a score of 8.7 out of 10 and GameSpy and X-Play gave it a score of 4 out of 5. GameSpot's Alex Navarro praised the game for improving nearly every aspect from its predecessor, including the new fighting styles, character creation, and interaction with weapons and environments. Criticism generally befell on the game's camera view and frame rate issues that are found in all console versions. Additionally reviewers mentioned that the game is laden with a lot of profanity. Aside from the frame rate, reviewers praised the game's graphics, with both IGN and GameSpot calling them "impressive". GameSpot later named it the best GameCube game of September 2004. It received runner-up positions in GameSpot's 2004 "Best Fighting Game" and "Best Licensed Music" award categories across all platforms.

Maxim gave it a score of eight out of ten and said: "Should the lyrically challenged feel left out, you can create your own brawler outfitted in ice courtesy of celebrity bling supplier Jacob the Jeweler. Better to look good than to—ow—feel good". The Sydney Morning Herald also gave the game four stars out of five and said that "the fact that it's got the deepest story ever seen in a fighter simply adds to the realistic feel of the brutal combat within".

During the 8th Annual Interactive Achievement Awards, the Academy of Interactive Arts & Sciences nominated Def Jam: Fight for NY for "Fighting Game of the Year".
