= WCW vs. the World =

1996 video game

- Playstation PAL cover featuring Sting
- Developer: The Man Breeze
- Publishers: JP: Asmik Ace Entertainment; WW: THQ
- Directors: Tako Fiorei; Kunihiko Shimizu
- Producer: Takeski Kajii
- Programmers: Shinya Shimomachi; Takeshi Furihata
- Composer: T's Music
- Series: Virtual Pro Wrestling
- Platform: PlayStation
- Release: JP: September 13, 1996; NA: March 28, 1997; EU: December 1997
- Genre: Fighting
- Modes: Single-player, multiplayer

WCW vs. the World is a professional wrestling video game for the PlayStation video game console. It was the first game developed by The Man Breeze to be released outside Japan, and is an American localization of their Japanese game Virtual Pro Wrestling (バーチャル・プロレスリング, Bācharu Puro Resuringu), the first game in the Virtual Pro Wrestling series. WCW vs. the World marks the first World Championship Wrestling video game released during its rise amidst the Monday Night War.

== Gameplay ==
WCW vs. the World features various modes including League Challenge, Best of Seven, Exhibition, Elimination, Tournament, League, and Double Title. Such modes are predominantly characteristic of Japanese pro wrestling as opposed to American customs.

The game includes many other establishing features that would carry on and improve in future AKI wrestling games. A "spirit meter" replaces the traditional but more linear energy bar to better suit the momentum of a wrestling match. However, it also features modes surrounding the winning, defense, and even creation of championship belts which would be entirely absent from the game's immediate successor, WCW vs. nWo: World Tour. The latter, however, would achieve far greater popularity thanks to its introduction of the intuitive "grappling system" not yet developed in WCW vs. the World.

== Roster ==
The game features 60 wrestlers. In addition to its WCW/nWo roster, in keeping with the game's title, WCW vs. the World also has several "fictional" foreign wrestlers. These performers are actually renamed counterparts of real-life Japanese wrestlers that could not be properly represented in the game's American version due to licensing restrictions. This practice of altering Japanese performers for American games would carry on through two more AKI games for the Nintendo 64.

=== World Championship Wrestling ===
- Chris Benoit
- Dean Malenko
- Eddy Guerrero
- The Giant
- Hulk Hogan
- Jeff Jarrett
- Lex Luger
- Masahiro Chono
- Ric Flair
- Rick Steiner
- Scott Steiner
- "Lord" Steven Regal
- Sting
- Último Dragón

=== "Fictional" wrestlers ===
- 200 Wins (Yoji Anjo)
- Abispa (Jushin "Thunder" Liger)
- Akira (Akira Maeda)
- Bad Blood (The Great Muta)
- Bear Breath (Gary Albright)
- Billy Gaijin (Scott Norton)
- Black Belt (TAKA Michinoku)
- Black Ninja (The Great Sasuke)
- Blackheart (Tarzan Goto)
- Bolt Jamison (Kensuke Sasaki as Power Warrior)
- The Count (Stan Hansen)
- Dakota (Hiroshi Hase)
- David Harley (Sabu)
- Dojo (Shinya Hashimoto)
- El Borador (Hiroyoshi Tenzan)
- Fujigami (Tatsumi Fujinami)
- Grizz Lee (Bruiser Brody)
- Habanero (Hayabusa)
- Jaguar (Tiger Mask)
- Kaiji (Yoshiaki Fujiwara)
- Kapuna (Toshiaki Kawada)
- Kim Chee (Kōji Kitao)
- Konaka (Shiro Koshinaka)
- Le Masquerade (Mil Máscaras)
- Mad Oahu (Riki Choshu)
- Major Tom (Terry Funk)
- Moma (Nobuhiko Takada)
- Mongol (Keiji Muto)
- Mongrel (Jumbo Tsuruta)
- Mukluk (Kensuke Sasaki)
- Overdose (Road Warrior Hawk)
- Puchteca (Atsushi Onita)
- Saladin (Genichiro Tenryu)
- Sam Song (Kenta Kobashi)
- Samoa (Giant Baba)
- Shanghai (Karl Gotch)
- Shaolin (Jinsei Shinzaki)
- Sherlock (Ken Shamrock)
- Siberia (Steve Williams)
- Steel Talon (Antonio Inoki)
- Thunder Dome (Bas Rutten)
- The Turk (Dynamite Kid's body with Vader's moves)
- The Unknown (Super Delfin)
- Uraki (Masakatsu Funaki)
- Wu Fang (Mitsuharu Misawa)
- Yamagiwa (Kazuo Yamazaki)

== Reception ==
Reception

Aggregate score
| Aggregator | Score |
|---|---|
| GameRankings | 74% |

Review scores
| Publication | Score |
|---|---|
| AllGame | 4/5 |
| Electronic Gaming Monthly | 7.75/10 |
| Famitsu | 25/40 |
| Game Informer | 8/10 |
| GameSpot | 6.3/10 |
| IGN | 6/10 |
| Joypad | 40% |
| Next Generation | 2/5 |

The game garnered above-average reviews, with the majority of praise aimed at its broad selection of gaming modes and wrestlers. Most critics commented on the cleanness of the polygon graphics, though some remarked that the textures are bland and minimal. Kraig Kujawa and Dean Hager of Electronic Gaming Monthly said WCW Vs. the World was "probably" the best 32-bit wrestling game to date, but further qualified that statement by noting that there were not many such games out. Jeff Gerstmann of GameSpot noted, "There are some problems with the play, and the sound is a bit lackluster, but the sheer number of characters and options make up for the deficiencies." A Next Generation reviewer instead contended that they "[don't] really amount compared to the game's numerous shortcomings." He found particular fault with the way the game treated wrestling as a serious sport, as compared to how WWF WrestleMania: The Arcade Game tapped into the drama and fantasy appeal of wrestling. GamePro instead judged the use of real wrestling holds and the authentic recreation of the looks and personalities of real wrestlers to be the best points of the game, and gave it a strong recommendation. (Note: GamePro gave the game 4/5 for graphics, 4/5 for sound, 5/5 for control, and 4.5/5 for fun factor.) IGN said, "The control is a little off [...] but the sheer amount of options should keep most wrestling fans happy."

In a 2008 retrospective on the history of wrestling video games, IGN's Rus McLaughlin lamented, "WCW vs. the World took a strong step towards 3D gaming on the PlayStation without putting a solid game behind it."

== See also ==
- List of licensed wrestling video games
