= Ultimate Muscle: Legends vs. New Generation =

2002 video game

- North American GameCube cover art
- Developer: AKI Corporation
- Publisher: Bandai
- Platform: GameCube
- Release: JP: November 22, 2002; NA: June 5, 2003
- Genre: Fighting
- Modes: Single-player, multiplayer

Ultimate Muscle: Legends vs. New Generation, known in Japan as Kinnikuman Nisei New Generation vs. Legends (キン肉マンII世 新世代超人VS伝説超人), is a wrestling video game based on the anime and manga, Ultimate Muscle. It was developed in Japan by AKI Corporation and released in Japan (in 2002) and North America (in 2003) only on the GameCube. It spawned two new expansions: Galactic Wrestling: Featuring Ultimate Muscle, released only on PlayStation 2 in 2004, and Kinnikuman Muscle Generations (キン肉マン マッスルジェネレーションズ), released in Japan on February 2, 2006 for the PlayStation Portable. This article contains explanations on the PlayStation 2 and PSP versions as well. In this game, the Choujins from the Kinnikuman (Legends) reappear via 3D Polygon and compete against the Nisei Choujins (New Generation) in their younger bodies.

== Series ==
Kinnikuman Nisei: New Generation vs. Legends / Ultimate Muscle: Legends vs. New Generation (GameCube; November 22, 2002 (Japan), June 5, 2003 (U.S.); Bandai)

The first in the series, the characters are presented with cel-shaded animation, looking almost identical to their manga counterparts.

Kinnikuman Generations / Galactic Wrestling: Featuring Ultimate Muscle (PlayStation 2; April 22, 2004 (Japan), June 30, 2004 (U.S.); Bandai)

An expansion of "Ultimate Muscle: Legends vs. New Generation", it was released on the 25th anniversary of Kinnikuman. The Story Mode and Choujin Creation Mode from the first game are removed. The game features tag matches and additional characters. The slow loading time and Toshio Furukawa's portrayal of Kinnikuman (replacing Akira Kamiya from the first game) caused the game to be a disappointment for many fans.
Advertising Slogan: Stand Up! Kinnikuman Generations!! (立ち上がれ!キン肉マン世代(ジェネレーションズ)よ!!, Tachiagare! Kinnikuman Jenereeshonzu yo!!)

Kinnikuman Muscle Generations (PlayStation Portable; February 23, 2006; Bandai)

An expansion of "Galactic Wrestling", it contains more characters and Story Modes. Akira Kamiya returns as the voice of Kinnikuman. Tag Team names from the Ultimate Choujin Tag Arc are used.

== Reception ==
Reception

Aggregate score
Aggregator	Score
Metacritic	77/100

Review scores
Publication	Score
Electronic Gaming Monthly	7.83/10
Famitsu	27/40
Game Informer	7.5/10
GamePro	4/5
GameSpot	8/10
GameSpy	3/5
GameZone	8.1/10
IGN	7.8/10
Nintendo Power	3.2/5
X-Play	4/5
Maxim	4/10
The Village Voice	8/10

The game received "generally favorable reviews" according to video game review aggregator Metacritic. In Japan, Famitsu gave it a score of 27 out of 40.

The editors of GameSpot named Ultimate Muscle the best GameCube game of June 2003, and nominated the title for their 2003 "Best Game No One Played" award, which ultimately went to Amplitude.
