= WCW vs. nWo: World Tour =

1997 video game

- North American Nintendo 64 cover art, featuring The Giant and Hollywood Hogan
- Developers: Asmik Ace Entertainment; AKI Corporation
- Publisher: THQ
- Director: Spirits of Kasa Jizou
- Composer: Hideaki Mitsui
- Platform: Nintendo 64
- Release: NA: December 2, 1997; EU: February 12, 1998
- Genres: Sports
- Modes: Single-player, multiplayer

WCW vs. nWo: World Tour is a professional wrestling video game released in 1997 for the Nintendo 64 game console. Released at the peak of World Championship Wrestling's (WCW) dominance in the Monday Night War, World Tour was THQ's first foray into the N64 wrestling scene and is a semi-sequel to the lesser known WCW vs. the World for the PlayStation. It is the second best-selling wrestling game for the N64 console.

Asmik Ace Entertainment and AKI Corporation approached the title by producing a wrestling game similar to Puroresu and fighting games. The resulting game was well received for its tight construction and ease of play, especially compared to Acclaim's comparatively more difficult and convoluted game, WWF War Zone. In fact, the playing style of World Tour, namely its revolutionary "grappling system", set a standard for pro wrestling video games to be expanded in future THQ titles for many years following.

Its sequel, WCW/nWo Revenge, would build upon the engine by introducing ring entrances, improved graphics, more arenas, more signature moves, actual WCW championships, attire modification, and other improvements.

== Gameplay ==
World Tour introduced Asmik/AKI's critically acclaimed grappling system, in which all moves are started by holds. Choosing to either tap or hold the A button will subsequently produce either "weak" or "strong" results once the move is performed, while a similar system is used for strikes. Wrestlers can also perform their signature taunts to help elevate their Spirit gauge and perform "Special" front and rear finishing moves when their gauge peaks.

In addition to single, tag team, handicap, and battle royal, match modes not seen in future releases include a WCW versus nWo tournament, round-robin tournament, and league tournaments more familiar to Japanese wrestling. Unlike today's wrestling games, World Tour features no create-a-wrestler mode, story mode, or ring entrances. It also makes no reference to championship belts and, upon the successful completion of a tournament, shows an illustration of a fist raising a gold trophy. A championship belt creation feature was touted prior to the game's release, but this was ultimately scrapped.

Players can also attempt the "league challenge" in which a player must defeat several wrestlers from a given "promotion" in a row. Doing so allows a player to compete for that promotion's championship against a hidden character: Diamond Dallas Page (WCW), Wrath (DOA), Glacier (IOU), Randy Savage (nWo). Once a player has earned every championship they unlock "Whole World Wrestling", a longer challenge consisting of wrestlers from all four promotions. The championship match being against one of the two hidden characters, depending on whether Cruiserweight or Heavyweight was selected: Black Widow (a caricature of Manami Toyota) or Joe Bruiser (a caricature of Muhammad Ali) for Heavyweight.

Other features were apparently carried over from the style of the game's Japanese counterpart. This includes the enabling of bleeding despite the practice being forbidden on WCW television due to its more family-friendly presentation. Foreign objects can be retrieved from the audience and used outside the ring. Weapons include a steel chair, half a wooden folding table, a black baseball bat, and a barbed wire bat, the latter not being characteristic of WCW programming but rather Japanese hardcore wrestling.

20 of the game's wrestlers are from WCW or the nWo, while the rest are international wrestlers who are listed under fake names.

== Development ==
WCW vs. nWo: World Tour was developed by Japanese companies AKI Corporation and Asmik Ace Entertainment and published by THQ. It followed AKI's earlier PlayStation wrestling game, WCW vs. the World (1997), and shared its underlying game engine with Virtual Pro Wrestling 64, released in Japan later that year. The game combined licensed wrestlers from World Championship Wrestling (WCW) and the New World Order (nWo) with fictionalized versions of wrestlers from international promotions.

The game represented THQ's first release for the Nintendo 64. According to a December 1997 report by the Los Angeles Daily News, development cost upwards of $1 million. THQ president Brian Farrell anticipated sales of several hundred thousand copies, while industry analyst James Lin estimated that sales exceeding 200,000 units would constitute a commercial success. Nintendo also included the game in a national television advertisement promoting the console during the Christmas shopping season.

THQ announced the game's North American launch on December 2, 1997, describing it as the first professional wrestling game released for the Nintendo 64. The company promoted a roster of more than 45 wrestlers, five gameplay modes and simultaneous four-player matches. The game supported the Nintendo 64's Rumble Pak and Controller Pak accessories and carried a suggested retail price of $59.95 to $69.95. A European release was planned for the first quarter of 1998.

== Reception ==
Reception

Aggregate score
Aggregator	Score
GameRankings	75%

Review scores
Publication	Score
Electronic Gaming Monthly	6.5/10, 5/10, 6/10, 6.5/10
GameFan	79/100 (Note: Two reviewers from GameFan gave WCW vs. nWo: World Tour different ratings: 85/100 and 73/100.)
GameSpot	5.7/10
Hyper	85/100
IGN	7.5/10
Joypad	6/10
N64 Magazine	70%
Nintendo Power	7.9/10
Official Nintendo Magazine	86%

Reviews for the game upon release ranged from mixed to moderately positive. Critics almost unanimously liked the large number of licensed wrestlers, wide range of gameplay modes, and large move set, but some found problems with how the game actually played. Electronic Gaming Monthly (EGM) and GameSpot both criticized the controls as inaccurate and questioned the lack of analog control. GameSpot commented, "A sense of timing is required not only to find holes in your opponent's defenses, but also to find the points at which the Nintendo 64 will allow you to perform moves at all." However, IGN defended the game's control: "Everything works quite well, despite some instinctive button mashing and slow-moving wrestlers at times." EGM and GameSpot both also said the single-player is fairly slow and boring, though like the overwhelming majority of reviewers, they found the multiplayer modes much more enjoyable, particularly battle royal. GameSpot explained, "Maybe it's the license, or maybe it's the capacity to grab foreign objects from outside the ring, or throw opponents from it, but this game brings out the best and worst in human competitors." Nintendo Power remarked, "The great thing about this game is that you can do a lot without knowing a lot, which makes it perfect for multiplayer matches when one or more players may be new to the game."

The visuals drew a variety of comments. While IGN and Nintendo Power found the polygonal graphics overall impressive, they joined GameSpot in noting the frequent clipping glitches which cause wrestlers to pass through each other in a slightly grotesque manner. Some also described the crowd graphics as ugly. However, the use of multiple camera angles during the execution of certain moves was praised. GamePro opined that "Although the wrestlers aren't size-proportioned ... their moves are well detailed, and they grab their injured limbs and bleed after getting whupped on." The reviewer concluded the game to be "a must-buy not just for wrestling fanatics, but for all fans of fun beat-you-bloody action games." (Note: GamePro gave WCW vs. nWo: World Tour 4.0/5 for graphics, 3.5/5 for sound, 4.5/5 for control, and 4.5/5 for fun factor.)

WCW vs. nWo: World Tour proved to be one of THQ's biggest hits. It was awarded the title of "Console Fighting Game of the Year" by the Academy of Interactive Arts & Sciences at the inaugural Interactive Achievement Awards (now known as the D.I.C.E. Awards). It gained Player's Choice status with over a million copies sold and its 1998 re-release was instrumental in THQ's 59% revenue increase in the year's third quarter. World Tour eventually sold 1.3 million copies in the US, making it the second best-selling wrestling game for the N64 and ranking it amongst the console's all-time best selling titles.

In IGN's 2008 "History of Wrestling Games" article, Rus McLaughlin reflected, "World Tour was just as revolutionary as the nWo storyline it borrowed, with all moves built off holds instead of happening out of nowhere. . . Suddenly, wrestling was all about the grapple again, and players loved it."

== See also ==
- List of licensed wrestling video games
- Virtual Pro Wrestling
