= WCW/nWo Revenge =

1998 video game

- North American Nintendo 64 cover art featuring Hollywood Hogan, Kevin Nash, Raven and Goldberg
- Developers: Asmik Ace Entertainment; AKI Corporation
- Publisher: THQ
- Director: Hideyuki "Geta San" Iwashita
- Producer: Takeshi Kajii
- Programmer: Hiro Abe
- Artist: Kenji Kimura
- Composers: Kouji Niikura; Yukie Sugawara
- Platform: Nintendo 64
- Release: NA: October 26, 1998; EU: November 30, 1998
- Genres: Sports
- Modes: Single-player, multiplayer

WCW/nWo Revenge is a professional wrestling video game developed by Asmik Ace Entertainment and AKI Corporation and released by THQ in 1998 for the Nintendo 64 game console. It is the sequel to 1997's WCW vs. nWo: World Tour. Like its predecessor, Revenge features AKI's proprietary grappling system; as well as heavily improved graphics, a championship mode, and a large roster of wrestlers (real and fictional).

Revenge gained critical praise and tremendous commercial success. According to a 1999 article by IGN, Revenge was the best-selling wrestling game for the N64 console, and at the time, was the top selling third-party Nintendo game ever.

Revenge was the last AKI-developed WCW game for the Nintendo 64. The next AKI wrestling game released for the console, WWF WrestleMania 2000, sported THQ's newly acquired World Wrestling Federation (WWF) license.

== Gameplay ==
WCW/nWo Revenge retains the grappling-based gameplay system of its predecessor, WCW vs. nWo: World Tour, with matches emphasizing the timing of grapples, wrestling moves and reversals. Wrestlers possess individual move sets, and the game supports up to four players. Available match types include exhibition, handicap and battle royal matches, alongside a championship mode in which players compete for WCW title belts. Winning championships unlocks additional playable wrestlers, including Kidman, Roddy Piper and Curt Hennig.

The game features a roster of more than 50 wrestlers, with entrances and arenas based on WCW events, including Starrcade, Halloween Havoc and Bash at the Beach. Its 40-man battle royal mode introduces a replacement wrestler whenever a participant is eliminated. Players can also use weapons during matches, while a costume editing feature allows existing wrestlers' appearances to be modified.

== Development and release ==
WCW/nWo Revenge was developed by AKI Corporation and Asmik Ace Entertainment as a sequel to the 1997 Nintendo 64 game WCW vs. nWo: World Tour. The game retained its predecessor's wrestling engine while introducing updated character models, animations and venues based on WCW television programming and pay-per-view events.

During development, THQ producer David Hoffman explained that the game's wrestler roster was being continually revised to reflect changes within WCW, including wrestlers changing costumes, affiliations or leaving the promotion. The development team intended to include more than 50 wrestlers. Hoffman also discussed the difficulties of incorporating extensive voice samples because of the Nintendo 64's technical limitations. The released game did not feature match commentary or individual wrestlers' entrance music.

WCW/nWo Revenge was released in North America by THQ on October 26, 1998. The game also supported the Nintendo 64 Rumble Pak.

== Reception ==
Nintendo 64 version reception

Aggregate score
Aggregator	Score
GameRankings	83%

Review scores
Publication	Score
IGN	8/10
N64 Magazine	75%
Next Generation	4/5

WCW/nWo Revenge surpassed the success of its predecessor, World Tour. In its first month of release, it was the second best-selling home console game in the United States (behind Metal Gear Solid). According to the NPD Group, the game was the seventh best-selling video game of 1998 in the United States by unit sales. Like its predecessor, Revenge also won "Console Fighting Game of the Year" by the Academy of Interactive Arts & Sciences at the 2nd Annual Interactive Achievement Awards, marking the second consecutive year an AKI/THQ title achieved the honor. It would quickly reach Player's Choice status and become heavily responsible for THQ's profits in late 1998 and 1999, eventually selling 1.88 million copies in the US and ranking substantially among the best-selling N64 games.

Next Generation rated it four stars out of five and commented that the full exhibitionist phenomenon of professional wrestling was better presented in Revenge than in other similar titles.

The game achieved critical favor for its numerous improvements on World Tour. Matt Casamassina of IGN commented that Revenge is better than World Tour in terms of gameplay, graphics, wrestler roster, atmosphere, controls and the ability to play the game with four players. In IGN's 2008 "History of Wrestling Games" article, Rus McLaughlin also commended Revenge for its expanded roster, authentic venues, and "style to burn".

== Legacy ==
WCW/nWo Revenge has continued to be regarded as one of the greatest professional wrestling video games. On its 20th anniversary in 2018, Chris Moyse of Destructoid praised its accessible grappling system and ability to simulate the pacing of professional wrestling matches, although he noted its limited game modes and dated audio. In 2020, Donald Wood of Bleacher Report ranked it first on his list of the greatest WWE and WCW video games, ahead of WWF No Mercy. Operation Sports included the game among its ten greatest wrestling games in 2025, highlighting its roster, championship mode and four-player multiplayer.

The gameplay mechanics established in Revenge were further developed in AKI Corporation's subsequent Nintendo 64 wrestling games, WWF WrestleMania 2000 (1999) and WWF No Mercy (2000). Nintendo Life retrospectively described No Mercy as building upon the gameplay fundamentals of Revenge and WrestleMania 2000, introducing features such as a branching story mode, ladder matches and backstage fighting.

In August 2025, former WCW executive Eric Bischoff named Revenge his favourite WCW video game, citing its branding and representation of the rivalry between WCW and the New World Order. Bischoff acknowledged that he had not personally played the game, explaining that his preference was based on its presentation and marketing rather than its gameplay.

== See also ==
- List of licensed wrestling video games
- Virtual Pro Wrestling
