= Syn Sophia =

Japanese video game development studio

syn Sophia, Inc.
- Trade name: syn Sophia
- Native name: 株式会社シンソフィア
- Romanized name: Kabushiki Gaisha Shin Sofia
- Formerly: The Man Breeze (1995–1997); AKI Corporation (1997–2007)
- Type: Kabushiki gaisha
- Industry: Video games
- Genre: Video game development
- Founded: June 19, 1995; 31 years ago in Tokyo, Japan
- Headquarters: Musashino, Tokyo, Japan
- Key people: Shuji Yoshida (CEO); Hiroya Tamura (Director)
- Number of employees: 70 (2016)
- Website: www.syn-sophia.co.jp

syn Sophia, Inc. (株式会社シンソフィア, Kabushiki Gaisha Shin Sofia), formerly AKI Corporation and The Man Breeze, is an independent video game development studio located in Kichijōji, Tokyo, Japan, founded on June 19, 1995. The company is best known for its popular wrestling games in the late 1990s and early-mid-2000s, starting with the release of Virtual Pro-Wrestling in 1996.

The company's take on World Championship Wrestling proved successful in the late 1990s with the release of several games, culminating in WCW/nWo Revenge for the Nintendo 64. As a result, the World Wrestling Federation ended their twelve-year relationship with Acclaim Entertainment and partnered with THQ/AKI in 1999. The relationship would continue AKI's reputation for quality wrestling games, which ended with the release of WWF No Mercy.

== History ==
The company went public in 1998 and on April 1, 2007 was renamed syn Sophia, Inc. The first game developed under that name was Ganbaru Watashi no Kakei Diary for the Nintendo DS in 2007. However, they used their previous name in some of their future titles until 2008 with the release of Style Savvy for the Nintendo DS. Ready 2 Rumble: Revolution would be developed under the name AKI Corporation USA.

== Games ==
=== Developed under The Man Breeze ===
Year	Name	Platform	Notes
1996	Virtual Pro-Wrestling	PlayStation	Released only in Japan
1997	WCW vs. the World	PlayStation	

=== Developed under AKI Corporation ===
Year	Name	Platform	Notes
1997	Tactics Formula	Saturn	Released only in Japan
1997	WCW vs. nWo: World Tour	Nintendo 64	
1997	Virtual Pro Wrestling 64	Nintendo 64	Released only in Japan
1998	WCW/nWo Revenge	Nintendo 64	
1999	WWF WrestleMania 2000	Nintendo 64	
2000	Virtual Pro Wrestling 2: Oudou Keishou	Nintendo 64	Released only in Japan
2000	Animastar	Dreamcast	Released only in Japan
2000	WWF No Mercy	Nintendo 64	
2001	Animastar GB	Game Boy Color	Released only in Japan
2001	World Fishing	Windows	Released only in Japan
2003	Def Jam Vendetta	PlayStation 2, GameCube	
2003	Ultimate Muscle: Legends vs. New Generation	GameCube	
2004	Def Jam: Fight for NY	PlayStation 2, Xbox, GameCube	
2004	Galactic Wrestling: Featuring Ultimate Muscle	PlayStation 2	
2006	Kinnikuman Muscle Generations	PlayStation Portable	Released only in Japan
2006	Def Jam: Fight for NY: The Takeover	PlayStation Portable	
2006	Kinnikuman Muscle Grand Prix	Arcade	Released only in Japan
2006	Kinnikuman Muscle Grand Prix MAX	PlayStation 2	Released only in Japan
2006	Mawashite Tsunageru Touch Panic	Nintendo DS	Released only in Japan
2007	Kinnikuman Muscle Grand Prix 2	Arcade	Released only in Japan
2007	SimCity DS	Nintendo DS	
2008	SimCity DS 2	Nintendo DS	
2008	Kinnikuman Muscle Grand Prix 2 Tokumori	PlayStation 2	Released only in Japan
2009	Ready 2 Rumble: Revolution	Wii	Developed under AKI Corporation USA

=== Developed under syn Sophia, Inc. ===
Year	Name	Platform	Publisher
2007	Ganbaru Watashi no Kakei Diary	Nintendo DS	Nintendo
2008	Style Savvy	Nintendo DS	Nintendo
2009	Cross Treasures	Nintendo DS	Square Enix
2009	Ganbaru Watashi no Osaifu Ouendan	Nintendo DSi	Nintendo
2010	Kurohyō: Ryū ga Gotoku Shinshō	PlayStation Portable	Sega
2010	Pretty Rhythm: Mini Skirt	Arcade	Takara Tomy Arts
2011	Pretty Rhythm: Aurora Dream	Arcade	Takara Tomy Arts
2012	Kurohyō 2: Ryū ga Gotoku Ashura Hen	PlayStation Portable	Sega
2012	Pretty Rhythm: Dear My Future	Arcade	Takara Tomy Arts
2012	Style Savvy: Trendsetters	Nintendo 3DS	Nintendo
2013	Pretty Rhythm: My Deco Rainbow Wedding	Nintendo 3DS	Takara Tomy Arts
2013	Pretty Rhythm: Rainbow Live	Arcade	Takara Tomy Arts
2013	Pretty Rhythm: Rainbow Live Duo	Arcade	Takara Tomy Arts
2013	Pretty Rhythm: Rainbow Live: Kirakira My Design	Nintendo 3DS	Takara Tomy Arts
2014	Pretty Rhythm: All Star Legend Coord Edition	Arcade	Takara Tomy Arts
2014	The Golden Hour	Android, iOS	Sammy Corporation
2014	PriPara	Arcade	Takara Tomy Arts
2015	PriPara & Pretty Rhythm: PriPara de Tsukaeru Oshare Item 1450!	Nintendo 3DS	Takara Tomy Arts
2015	Style Savvy: Fashion Forward	Nintendo 3DS	Nintendo
2017	Style Savvy: Styling Star	Nintendo 3DS	Nintendo
2017	Idol Time PriPara	Arcade	Takara Tomy Arts
2018	PriPara: All Idol Perfect Stage!	Nintendo Switch	Takara Tomy Arts
2018	Kiratto Pri☆Chan	Arcade	Takara Tomy Arts
2020	Dragon Quest: The Adventure of Dai – Xross Blade	Arcade	Square Enix
2021	Waccha PriMagi!	Arcade	Takara Tomy Arts
2023	Fashion Dreamer	Nintendo Switch	Marvelous
2024	Fitness Boxing 3: Your Personal Trainer	Nintendo Switch	Imagineer (Japan); Nintendo (worldwide)
2026	Magical Craft: My Enchanted Dress Shop	Nintendo Switch	Imagineer

=== Unreleased games ===
A version of WWF No Mercy for the Game Boy Color was in the works and planned for release alongside the Nintendo 64 version. The game was originally planned to utilize the Nintendo 64 Transfer Pak accessory to unlock special content in each version of the game. This feature was later scrapped, however, with the extra content in each version instead being unlocked via gameplay. After further developmental woes, the game was shifted to Natsume, developers of the previous WWF game for Game Boy Color, before finally being canceled in late December 2000. Screenshots of this game at one point existed, but the websites which had them up were forced to remove them following the game's cancellation.

A sequel to WWF No Mercy was rumored to have been planned. However, Sanders Keel, producer of various AKI wrestling titles, confirmed in an interview that this rumor was false.

A sequel to Electronic Arts' WCW Mayhem titled WCW 2000 and later, WCW Mayhem 2 was going to be developed by AKI and was planned for a PlayStation 2 release. There were even some screenshots featured in Issue #33 (May 2000) of the Official PlayStation Magazine. However, it was also shelved in 2001 after the World Wrestling Federation purchased World Championship Wrestling. The engine of this game would later be recycled for Def Jam Vendetta.

A puzzle video game spinoff of the Dreamcast game Animastar, titled Animastar Puzzle, was announced in early 2000 but was later cancelled, presumably due to the sudden demise of the Dreamcast console.

Mikke! was an action game announced for the Nintendo DS console in early 2008. It was later cancelled for unknown reasons.

In 2019, Game Informer journalist Imran Khan reported on numerous games that were cancelled mid-development for the Nintendo 3DS due to the commercial failure of Mario & Luigi: Bowser's Inside Story + Bowser Jr.'s Journey. Among those named was an entry into the Style Savvy series.
