= 2000 in video games =

The year 2000 saw the release of numerous video games as well as the launch of the PlayStation 2. Critically acclaimed games originally released in 2000 include sequels such as Madden NFL 2001, NBA Live 2001, NBA 2K1, WWF SmackDown! 2: Know Your Role, Baldur's Gate II, Diablo II, Dragon Quest VII, Final Fantasy IX, Metal Gear: Ghost Babel, NFL 2K1, Resident Evil – Code: Veronica, Spyro: Year of the Dragon, The Legend of Zelda: Majora's Mask, and Tony Hawk's Pro Skater 2, alongside new intellectual properties such as Deus Ex, Hitman, Jet Set Radio, Perfect Dark, Skies of Arcadia, The Sims, SSX, Vagrant Story, and Sin and Punishment. The year's best-selling home video games worldwide were Pokémon games for the third year in a row (since 1998), while the highest-grossing arcade game in Japan was Virtua Striker 2.

Series with new installments include Age of Empires, Banjo-Kazooie, Command & Conquer, Diablo, Excite, Final Fantasy, Grandia, The Legend of Zelda, Madden NFL, Marvel vs. Capcom, Mega Man Legends, Monkey Island, Mortal Kombat, Need for Speed, Persona, Pokémon, Resident Evil, Ridge Racer, Sonic the Hedgehog, Spyro, Tekken, Tom Clancy's Rainbow Six, Tony Hawk's, and Wario.

In addition, 2000 saw the introduction of several new properties, including Counter-Strike, Deus Ex, Hitman, Jet Set Radio, Kessen, Mario Tennis, Midnight Club, Paper Mario, Perfect Dark, The Sims, SSX, TimeSplitters, and Total War.

== Legend ==
Video game platforms
DC	Dreamcast	GB	Game Boy	GBC	Game Boy Color
GEN	Genesis / Mega Drive	JAG	Atari Jaguar	LIN	Linux, SteamOS
MAC	Classic Mac OS, 2001 and before	N64	Nintendo 64, iQue Player	NES	Nintendo Entertainment System / Famicom
NGPC	Neo Geo Pocket Color	PS1	PlayStation 1	PS2	PlayStation 2
SAT	Sega Saturn	SNES	Super NES / Super Famicom / Super Comboy	WIN	Windows, all versions Windows 95 and up
WS	WonderSwan				

== Hardware releases ==
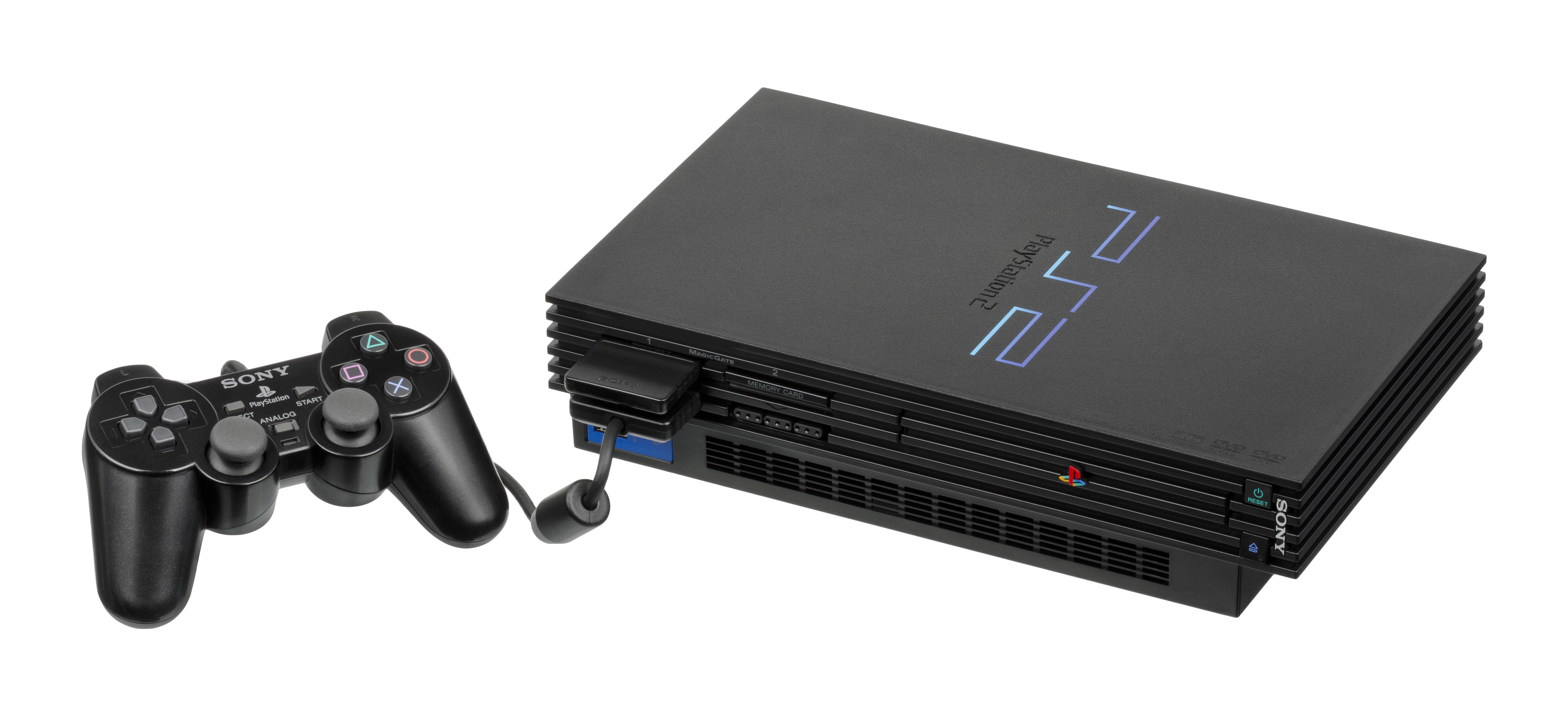
PlayStation 2

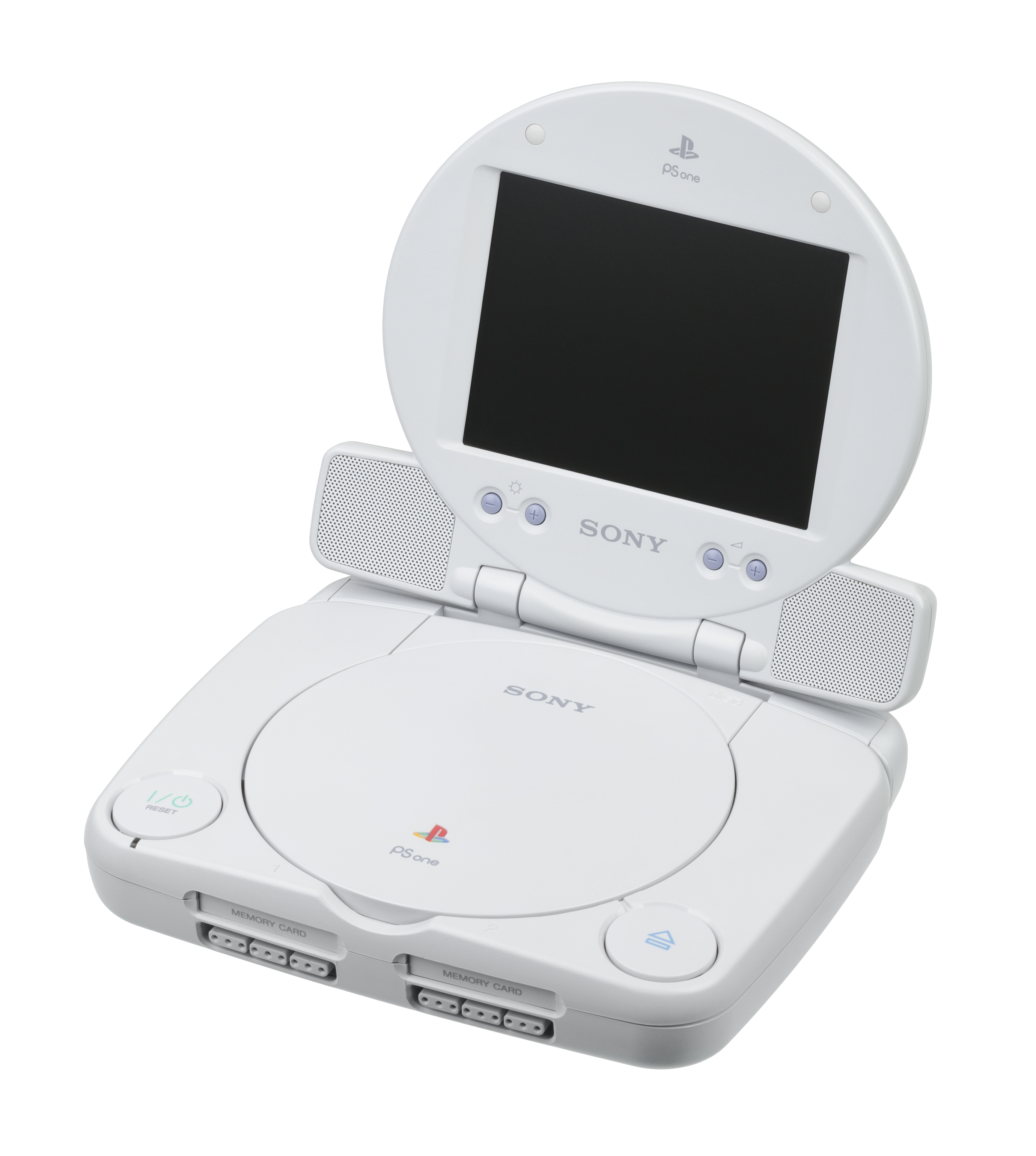
PS One

The list of game-related hardware released in 2000.

Sony released the PlayStation 2, which as to this day is still the best selling video game console of all time (with 160m+ units sold). Sony also released the PS One, a small revision model of the original PlayStation that can be played portably with a LCD add-on.

Date	System
March 4	PlayStation 2^{JP}
July 7	PS One
September 19	PS One^{NA}
September 29	PS One^{EU}
October 26	PlayStation 2^{NA}
November	PS One^{EA}
November 24	PlayStation 2^{EU}
November 30	PlayStation 2^{AU}
December 9	WonderSwan Color^{JP}
Unknown	Sega NAOMI 2 (arcade)

== Top-rated games ==
=== Game of the Year awards ===
The following titles won Game of the Year awards for 2000.

Awards	Game of the Year	Developer	Publisher	Genre	Platform(s)	Ref
GameSpot	Chrono Cross	Squaresoft	Square EA	RPG	PS1	
IGN	Chrono Cross	Squaresoft	Square EA	RPG	PS1	
BAFTA Interactive Awards	Deus Ex	Ion Storm	Eidos	Action RPG	WIN, MAC	
IGN	Deus Ex	Ion Storm	Eidos	Action RPG	WIN, MAC	
Electronic Playground	Deus Ex	Ion Storm	Eidos	Action RPG	WIN, MAC	
GameSpy	Deus Ex	Ion Storm	Eidos	Action RPG	WIN, MAC	
Electronic Gaming Monthly	Final Fantasy IX	Squaresoft	Square EA	RPG	PS1	
Golden Satellite Awards	Final Fantasy IX	Squaresoft	Square EA	RPG	PS1	
Electronic Playground	Final Fantasy IX	Squaresoft	Square EA	RPG	PS1	
Core Magazine	Final Fantasy IX	Squaresoft	Square EA	RPG	PS1	
IGN	The Legend of Zelda: Majora's Mask	Nintendo EAD	Nintendo	Action-adventure	N64	
Nintendo Power Awards	The Legend of Zelda: Majora's Mask	Nintendo EAD	Nintendo	Action-adventure	N64	
GameRevolution	The Legend of Zelda: Majora's Mask	Nintendo EAD	Nintendo	Action-adventure	N64	
Electronic Playground	The Legend of Zelda: Majora's Mask	Nintendo EAD	Nintendo	Action-adventure	N64	
DailyRadar UK	The Legend of Zelda: Majora's Mask	Nintendo EAD	Nintendo	Action-adventure	N64	
Electronic Playground	Jet Set Radio	Smilebit	Sega	Platform	DC	
Computer Gaming World	The Sims	Maxis	EA	Life sim	WIN, MAC	
GamePower	The Sims	Maxis	EA	Life sim	WIN, MAC	
GameSpot	The Sims	Maxis	EA	Life sim	WIN, MAC	
GDC Awards	The Sims	Maxis	EA	Life sim	WIN, MAC	
Interactive Achievement Awards	The Sims	Maxis	EA	Life sim	WIN, MAC	
Electronic Gaming Monthly	Tony Hawk's Pro Skater 2	Neversoft	Activision	Sports	PS1, DC	
Game Informer	Tony Hawk's Pro Skater 2	Neversoft	Activision	Sports		
GameRevolution	Tony Hawk's Pro Skater 2	Neversoft	Activision	Sports	PS1	
BAFTA Interactive Awards	MediEvil 2	SCE Cambridge	Sony	Hack & slash	PS1	
BAFTA Interactive Awards	Pokémon Yellow	Game Freak	Nintendo	RPG	GBC	
Digitiser	Metropolis Street Racer	Bizarre	Sega	Racing	DC	
Electronic Gaming Monthly	Shenmue	Sega AM2	Sega	Action-adventure	DC	
IGN	Metal Gear Solid (Metal Gear: Ghost Babel)	KCEJ	Konami	Stealth	GBC	
Interactive Achievement Awards	Diablo II	Blizzard North	Blizzard	Action RPG	WIN, MAC	
Japan Game Awards	Phantasy Star Online	Sonic Team	Sega	Action RPG	DC	
Japan Media Arts Festival	Dragon Quest VII	Heartbeat	Enix	RPG	PS1	
RPGFan	Grandia II	Game Arts	Ubisoft	RPG	DC	
VSDA Awards	Pokémon Stadium	Nintendo EAD	Nintendo	Strategy	N64	

=== Critically acclaimed titles ===
==== Famitsu Platinum Hall of Fame ====
The following video game releases in 2000 entered Famitsu magazine's "Platinum Hall of Fame" for receiving Famitsu scores of at least 35 out of 40.

Title	Platform	Publisher	Genre	Score (out of 40)
Vagrant Story	PS1	Squaresoft	Action RPG	40
Tekken Tag Tournament	PS2	Namco	Fighting	38
Final Fantasy IX	PS1	Squaresoft	RPG	38
Dragon Quest VII: Eden no Senshi-tachi	PS1	Enix	RPG	38
The Legend of Zelda: Mujura no Kamen (Majora's Mask)	N64	Nintendo	Action-adventure	37
Phantasy Star Online	DC	Sega	Action RPG	37
Ridge Racer V	PS2	Namco	Racing	36
Fushigi no Dungeon: Fūrai no Shiren 2 (Shiren the Wanderer 2)	N64	Nintendo	Roguelike	36
Biohazard – Code: Veronica (Resident Evil – Code: Veronica)	DC	Capcom	Survival horror	35
Trade & Battle: Card Hero	GBC	Nintendo	Card battle	35
The Typing of the Dead	DC	Sega	Edutainment	35
Jikkyō Powerful Pro Yakyū 7	PS2	Konami	Sports	35
Grandia II	DC	Game Arts	RPG	35
MotoGP	PS2	Namco	Racing	35
Tsumi to Batsu: Hoshi no Keishōsha (Sin and Punishment)	N64	Nintendo	Rail shooter	35

==== Metacritic and GameRankings ====
Metacritic (MC) and GameRankings (GR) are aggregators of video game journalism reviews.

2000 games and expansions scoring at least 88/100 (MC) or 87.5% (GR)
Game	Publisher	Release Date	Platform(s)	MC score	GR score
Tony Hawk's Pro Skater 2	Activision	September 20, 2000	PS1	98/100	94.75%
Tony Hawk's Pro Skater 2	Activision	November 7, 2000	DC	97/100	94.86%
Perfect Dark	Nintendo	May 22, 2000	N64	97/100	94.55%
NFL 2K1	Sega	September 7, 2000	DC	97/100	94.5%
Metal Gear Solid (Metal Gear: Ghost Babel)	Konami	April 24, 2000	GBC	—N/a	95.61%
Baldur's Gate II: Shadows of Amn	Interplay Entertainment	September 21, 2000	WIN	95/100	93.97%
The Legend of Zelda: Majora's Mask	Nintendo	April 27, 2000	N64	95/100	91.95%
Resident Evil – Code: Veronica	Capcom	February 3, 2000	DC	94/100	93.79%
Final Fantasy IX	Square	July 7, 2000	PS1	94/100	92.72%
Jet Set Radio	Sega	June 29, 2000	DC	94/100	91.9%
Tony Hawk's Pro Skater	Crave Entertainment	May 22, 2000	DC	—N/a	94%
Rayman 2: The Great Escape	Ubisoft	March 21, 2000	DC	—N/a	93.05%
SSX	EA Sports	October 26, 2000	PS2	93/100	92.39%
Skies of Arcadia	Sega	October 5, 2000	DC	93/100	90.59%
NBA 2K1	Sega	October 31, 2000	DC	93/100	89.69%
Le Mans 24 Hours	Sega	November 13, 2000	DC	93/100	89.5%
Paper Mario	Nintendo	August 11, 2000	N64	93/100	88.81%
Tony Hawk's Pro Skater	Activision	February 29, 2000	N64	—N/a	92.4%
Vagrant Story	Square	February 10, 2000	PS1	92/100	91.97%
The Sims	Electronic Arts	February 4, 2000	WIN, MAC	92/100	89.74%
Dead or Alive 2	Tecmo	February 29, 2000	DC	—N/a	91.37%
Virtua Tennis	Sega	June 8, 2000	DC	92/100	91.37%
Banjo-Tooie	Nintendo	November 20, 2000	N64	90/100	91.31%
Deus Ex	Eidos Interactive	June 23, 2000	WIN, MAC	90/100	91.03%
Madden NFL 2001	EA Sports	October 26, 2000	PS2	91/100	90.78%
Spyro: Year of the Dragon	Sony Computer Entertainment	October 10, 2000	PS1	91/100	90.59%
The Operative: No One Lives Forever	Fox Interactive	November 9, 2000	WIN	91/100	88.34%
DOA2: Hardcore	Tecmo	October 26, 2000	PS2	91/100	87.38%
Mario Tennis	Nintendo	July 21, 2000	N64	91/100	87.32%
Tony Hawk's Pro Skater 2	Activision	October 25, 2000	WIN	91/100	85.77%
Mario Tennis	Nintendo	November 1, 2000	GBC	—N/a	90.78%
Donkey Kong Country	Nintendo	November 4, 2000	GBC	—N/a	90.38%
Pokémon Puzzle Challenge	Nintendo	September 21, 2000	GBC	—N/a	90.2%
Crazy Taxi	Sega	January 24, 2000	DC	—N/a	90.19%
Marvel vs. Capcom 2: New Age of Heroes	Capcom	March 30, 2000	DC	90/100	90.15%
Colin McRae Rally 2.0	Codemasters	July 7, 2000	PS1	90/100	88.82%
Grandia II	Game Arts	August 3, 2000	DC	90/100	88.81%
Madden NFL 2001	EA Sports	August 22, 2000	PS1	90/100	88.65%
Jane's F/A-18	Electronic Arts	January 11, 2000	WIN	—N/a	88.43%
NHL 2001	EA Sports	September 28, 2000	WIN	90/100	86.75%
Rayman Revolution	Ubisoft	December 22, 2000	PS2	90/100	85.17%
WWF SmackDown! 2: Know Your Role	THQ	November 21, 2000	PS1	90/100	84.27%
Wario Land 3	Nintendo	March 21, 2000	GBC	—N/a	90%
Phantasy Star Online	Sega	December 21, 2000	DC	89/100	89.88%
Sacrifice	Interplay Entertainment	November 17, 2000	WIN	89/100	89.53%
Counter-Strike	Sierra Entertainment	November 9, 2000	WIN	88/100	89.2%
Thief II	Eidos Interactive	March 23, 2000	WIN	87/100	89.14%
Age of Empires II: The Conquerors	Microsoft	August 24, 2000	WIN	88/100	89.11%
EverQuest: The Ruins of Kunark	Sony Online Entertainment	April 24, 2000	WIN	86/100	89.08%
Excitebike 64	Nintendo	April 30, 2000	N64	88/100	89.07%
Homeworld: Cataclysm	Sierra Entertainment	June 30, 2000	WIN	89/100	88.64%
Samba de Amigo	Sega	April 27, 2000	DC	89/100	86.15%
WWF No Mercy	THQ	November 17, 2000	N64	89/100	85.27%
Madden NFL 2001	EA Sports	August 28, 2000	N64	89/100	84.82%
Metropolis Street Racer	Sega	November 3, 2000	DC	87/100	88.59%
Diablo II	Blizzard Entertainment	June 28, 2000	WIN, MAC	88/100	88.58%
MDK2	Interplay Entertainment	March 31, 2000	DC	N/A	88.08%
Combat Mission: Beyond Overlord	Battlefront.com	May 31, 2000	WIN	N/A	88%
Ultimate Fighting Championship	Crave Entertainment	August 29, 2000	DC	88/100	87.8%
Superbike 2001	EA Sports	October 6, 2000	WIN	88/100	87.32%
NHL 2001	EA Sports	September 26, 2000	PS1	88/100	84.11%
Enemy Engaged: RAH-66 Comanche vs. KA-52 Hokum	Empire Interactive	July 31, 2000	WIN	86/100	87.96%
Legacy of Kain: Soul Reaver	Eidos Interactive	January 27, 2000	DC	N/A	87.94%
PGA Championship Golf 2000	Sierra Entertainment	June 1, 2000	WIN	N/A	87.77%
Steel Beasts	Shrapnel Games	September 24, 2000	WIN	86/100	87.58%

== Financial performance ==
=== Best-selling video game consoles ===
Rank	Manufacturer	Game console	Type	Generation	Sales			
Rank	Manufacturer	Game console	Type	Generation	Japan	USA	Europe	Worldwide
1	Sony	PS1	Home	32-bit	940,000	3,910,000	2,940,000	7,790,000
2	Nintendo	GB / GBC	Handheld	8-bit	3,370,000	Unknown	Unknown	18,860,000
3	Sony	PS2	Home	128-bit	3,940,000	1,088,000	1,000,000	6,400,000
4	Nintendo	N64	Home	64-bit	200,000	2,481,000	Unknown	2,850,000
5	Sega	DC	Home	128-bit	470,000	1,309,000	500,000+	2,279,000+
6	Bandai	WS	Handheld	16-bit	1,400,000	—N/a	—N/a	1,400,000
7	Nintendo	SNES (Super Famicom)	Home	16-bit	10,000	810	Unknown	90,000
8	Sega	GEN (Mega Drive)	Home	16-bit	—N/a	54,000	Unknown	54,000+
9	Nintendo	NES (Famicom)	Home	8-bit	50,000	—N/a	—N/a	50,000
10	Sega	SAT	Home	32-bit	Unknown	810	—N/a	810+

=== Best-selling home video games ===
The following titles were the top ten best-selling home video games of 2000 in Japan, the United States, United Kingdom, and Germany.

Best-selling home video games in Japan, United States, United Kingdom, and Germany.
Rank	Title	Platform(s)	Sales				
Rank	Title	Platform(s)	Japan	USA	UK	Germany	Combined
1	Pokémon Gold / Silver / Crystal	GBC	3,448,900	4,000,000+	—N/a	—N/a	7,450,000+
2	Pokémon Red / Blue / Yellow	GB	315,443	3,700,000+	900,000+	800,000+	5,715,443+
3	Dragon Quest VII: Eden no Senshi-tachi	PS1	3,900,000+	—N/a	—N/a	—N/a	3,900,000+
4	Final Fantasy IX	PS1	2,707,000	987,354	Unknown	Unknown	3,694,354+
5	Tony Hawk's Pro Skater	PS1, N64	—N/a	2,307,835	Unknown	Unknown	2,307,835+
6	Gran Turismo 2	PS1	315,173	1,155,469	300,000+	200,000+	1,970,642+
7	Tony Hawk's Pro Skater 2	PS1, N64	—N/a	1,839,332	Unknown	100,000+	1,939,332+
8	The Legend of Zelda: Majora's Mask	N64	601,542	1,206,489	Unknown	Unknown	1,808,031+
9	Pokémon Stadium (Pokémon Stadium 2)	N64	42,166	1,701,820	Unknown	Unknown	1,743,986+
10	Yu-Gi-Oh! Duel Monsters 4	GBC	1,669,308	—N/a	—N/a	—N/a	1,669,308

The following titles were the top ten highest-grossing home video games of 2000 in the United States and Europe.

Highest-grossing home video games in United States and Europe
Rank	Title	Platform(s)	Sales revenue			
Rank	Title	Platform(s)	USA	Europe	Combined	Inflation
1	Pokémon Red / Blue / Yellow	GB	$94,000,000+	€296,000,000 ($273,000,000)	$367,000,000+	$690,000,000+
2	Pokémon Stadium	N64	$100,000,000	€76,000,000 ($70,000,000)	$176,000,000	$329,000,000
3	Pokémon Gold / Silver	GBC	$110,000,000+	—N/a	$110,000,000+	$210,000,000+
4	The Legend of Zelda: Majora's Mask	N64	$72,000,000	€27,000,000 ($25,000,000)	$97,000,000	$180,000,000
5	Gran Turismo 2	PS1	$37,000,000	€63,000,000 ($58,000,000)	$95,000,000	$178,000,000
6	Tony Hawk's Pro Skater 2		$74,000,000+	€20,000,000 ($18,000,000)	$92,000,000	$170,000,000+
7	Tony Hawk's Pro Skater	PS1, N64	$88,000,000	Unknown	$88,000,000+	$160,000,000+
8	The Sims	WIN, MAC	$50,773,114	€36,000,000 ($33,000,000)	$83,773,114	$156,619,300
9	Madden NFL 2001	PS2, PS1	$68,000,000+	Unknown	$68,000,000+	$127,000,000+
10	Diablo II	WIN, MAC	$41,051,565	€25,000,000 ($23,000,000)	$64,051,565	$119,748,578

==== Japan ====
In Japan, the following titles were the top ten best-selling home video games of 2000.

Rank	Title	Platform	Developer	Publisher	Genre	Sales	Ref
1	Dragon Quest VII: Eden no Senshi-tachi	PS1	Heartbeat	Enix	RPG	3,900,000+	
2	Pocket Monsters: Gold / Silver / Crystal (Pokémon)	GBC	Game Freak	Nintendo	RPG	3,448,900	
3	Final Fantasy IX	PS1	Squaresoft	Squaresoft	RPG	2,707,000	
4	Yu-Gi-Oh! Duel Monsters 4: Battle of Great Duelists	GBC	Konami	Konami	Card battle	1,669,308	
5	Hoshi no Kirby 64 (Kirby 64: The Crystal Shards)	N64	HAL Laboratory	Nintendo	Platformer	933,000	
6	Mario Tennis 64 (Mario Tennis)	N64	Camelot Software	Nintendo	Sports	874,350	
7	Yu-Gi-Oh! Duel Monsters III: Tri-Holygod Advent	GBC	Konami	Konami	Card battle	781,000	
8	Mario Party 3	N64	Hudson Soft	Nintendo	Party	767,000	
9	Super Robot Taisen Alpha (Super Robot Wars Alpha)	PS1	Banpresoft	Banpresto	SRPG	714,789	
10	Ridge Racer V	PS2	Namco	Namco	Racing	689,000	

==== United States ====
In the United States, the following titles were the top ten best-selling home video games of 2000.

Rank	Title	Platform(s)	Publisher	Genre	Sales	Revenue	Inflation	Ref
1	Pokémon Gold / Silver	GBC	Nintendo	RPG	4,000,000+	$110,000,000+	$210,000,000+	
2	Pokémon Red / Blue / Yellow	GB	Nintendo	RPG	3,700,000+	$94,000,000+	$180,000,000+	
3	Tony Hawk's Pro Skater	PS1, N64	Activision	Sports	2,307,835	$88,000,000	$160,000,000	
4	Tony Hawk's Pro Skater 2	PS1, DC	Activision	Sports	1,839,332	$74,000,000+	$140,000,000+	
5	Pokémon Stadium	N64	Nintendo	Strategy	1,701,820	$100,000,000	$187,000,000	
6	Madden NFL 2001	PS2, PS1	EA Sports	Sports	1,652,054	$68,000,000+	$127,000,000+	
7	The Sims	WIN, MAC	EA	Life sim	1,207,313	$50,773,114	$94,923,648	
8	The Legend of Zelda: Majora's Mask	N64	Nintendo	Action-adventure	1,206,489	$72,000,000	$130,000,000	
9	Gran Turismo 2	PS1	Sony	Racing sim	1,155,469	$37,000,000	$69,000,000	
10	Final Fantasy IX	PS1	Square EA	RPG	987,354	$39,000,000	$73,000,000	

The following titles were the year's top six highest-grossing home video game franchises in the United States, in terms of video game software sales revenue.

Rank	Franchise	Publisher(s)	Sales revenue	Inflation
1	Pokémon	Nintendo, The Pokémon Company	$414,800,290	$775,496,194
2	Mario	Nintendo	$126,280,160	$236,088,995
3	The Legend of Zelda	Nintendo	$93,103,817	$174,063,658
4	Final Fantasy	Squaresoft, Sony, Eidos Interactive, Square EA	$61,899,388	$115,724,943
5	Donkey Kong	Nintendo	$41,517,999	$77,620,607
6	Tomb Raider	Eidos Interactive	$28,874,777	$53,983,279

==== Europe ====
In Europe, the following titles were the top ten highest-grossing home video games of 2000.

Rank	Title	Platform(s)	Publisher	Genre	Sales revenue	Inflation
1	Pokémon Red / Blue / Yellow	GB	Nintendo	RPG	€296,000,000 ($273,000,000)	$510,000,000
2	Pokémon Stadium	N64	Nintendo	Strategy	€76,000,000 ($70,000,000)	$131,000,000
3	Gran Turismo 2	PS1	Sony	Racing sim	€63,000,000 ($58,000,000)	$108,000,000
4	FIFA 2001		EA Sports	Sports	€44,000,000 ($41,000,000)	$77,000,000
5	Who Wants to Be a Millionaire?		Eidos	Quiz	€43,000,000 ($40,000,000)	$75,000,000
6	Pokémon Pinball	GBC	Nintendo	Pinball	€36,000,000 ($33,000,000)	$62,000,000
6	The Sims	WIN, MAC	EA	Life sim	€36,000,000 ($33,000,000)	$62,000,000
8	Driver 2	PS1	Infogrames	Driving	€27,000,000 ($25,000,000)	$47,000,000
8	The Legend of Zelda: Majora's Mask	N64	Nintendo	Action-adventure	€27,000,000 ($25,000,000)	$47,000,000
10	WWF SmackDown! 2: Know Your Role	PS1	THQ	Wrestling	€25,000,000 ($23,000,000)	$43,000,000
10	Diablo II	WIN, MAC	Havas	Action RPG	€25,000,000 ($23,000,000)	$43,000,000

In the United Kingdom and France, the following titles were the best-selling home video games of 2000.

Rank	United Kingdom			France
Rank	Title	Platform(s)	Sales	France
1	Who Wants to Be a Millionaire?		1,000,000	Pokémon Yellow
2	Pokémon Red / Blue / Yellow	GB	900,000+	Unknown
3	Gran Turismo 2	PS1	300,000+	Unknown
4	WWF SmackDown! 2: Know Your Role	PS1	Unknown	Unknown
5	WWF SmackDown!	PS1	Unknown	Unknown

In Germany, the following titles were the best-selling home video games of 2000.

Rank	GB	Sales	PS1	Sales	PC	Sales
1	Pokémon Red / Blue	800,000+	Gran Turismo 2	200,000+	Diablo II	200,000+
2	Pokémon Yellow	Unknown	Tony Hawk's Pro Skater 2	100,000+	The Sims	100,000+
3	Pokémon Pinball	Unknown	Resident Evil 3: Nemesis	100,000+	Sudden Strike	100,000+

==== Australia ====
In Australia, the following titles were the top ten best-selling console games of 2000.

Rank	Title	Platform	Developer	Publisher	Genre
1	Pokémon Gold	GBC	Game Freak	Nintendo	RPG
2	Pokémon Silver	GBC	Game Freak	Nintendo	RPG
3	Pokémon Stadium	N64	Nintendo EAD	Nintendo	Strategy
4	Gran Turismo 2	PS1	Polyphony Digital	Sony	Racing sim
5	Pokémon Yellow	GBC	Game Freak	Nintendo	RPG
6	Star Wars Episode I: Racer	N64	LucasArts	LucasArts	Racing
7	Pokémon Blue	GB	Game Freak	Nintendo	RPG
8	Donkey Kong 64	N64	Rare	Nintendo	Platformer
9	Pokémon Red	GB	Game Freak	Nintendo	RPG
10	Perfect Dark	N64	Rare	Nintendo	First-person shooter

=== Highest-grossing arcade games in Japan ===
In Japan, the following titles were the top ten highest-grossing arcade games of 2000.

Rank	Title	Developer	Manufacturer	Type	Genre	Points
1	Virtua Striker 2 ver. 99 / 2000	Sega AM2	Sega	Software	Sports	5753
2	Tekken Tag Tournament	Namco	Namco	Software	Fighting	3734
3	Samba de Amigo	Sonic Team	Sega	Dedicated	Rhythm	3204
4	Power Smash (Virtua Tennis)	Sega AM3	Sega	Software	Sports	3075
5	Mr. Driller	Namco	Namco	Software	Puzzle	2951
6	Derby Owners Club	Sega AM3	Sega	Dedicated	Simulation	2766
7	Time Crisis 2	Namco	Namco	Dedicated	Light gun shooter	2741
8	The House of the Dead 2	Sega AM1	Sega	Dedicated	Light gun shooter	2700
9	Photo & Seal Kilala	Make Software	Make Software	Other	Purikura	2579
10	Garou: Mark of the Wolves	SNK	SNK	Software	Fighting	2439

== Major events ==
Date	Event
January 7	Publisher ASC Games shut down due to financial issues arising with the ongoing delay of their upcoming game, Werewolf: The Apocalypse – The Heart of Gaia.
January	Digital Illusions CE acquires Refraction Games and 90% of Synergenix Interactive.
February 4	First annual Dreamcast Championships, featuring the game Sonic Adventure.
February	Electronic Arts acquired DreamWorks Interactive, the games division of DreamWorks SKG, becoming EA Los Angeles.
March	Game Network hosts the second annual Independent Games Festival (IGF).
April 14	Reuters reports that the PlayStation 2 console would have export controls placed on it by the Trade Ministry of Japan as the PS2 is sophisticated enough for military applications.
April	Nintendo sells its 100 millionth Game Boy / Game Boy Color handheld game console.
May 11	The Academy of Interactive Arts & Sciences hosts the third Annual Interactive Achievement Awards and inducts Hironobu Sakaguchi of Square into the AIAS Hall of Fame.
May 11–13	The sixth annual Electronic Entertainment Expo (E3) is held along with the third annual Game Critics Awards for the Best of E3.
May 22	The Pac-Man franchise celebrated its 20th anniversary in Japan.
May 24	Looking Glass Studios was shut down.
June 19	Microsoft acquired Bungie.
June 26	Computer Game Developers Association is renamed to International Game Developers Association.
June 30	Nintendo's Satellaview system ceases to receive broadcasts.
June	Sony acquired Verant Interactive.
July	Interactive Entertainment Merchants Association hosts first annual Executive Summit.
August 31	THQ acquired Volition.
August	Ubi Soft acquired Red Storm Entertainment.
September 10	Sega.com launches SegaNet, their online console gaming network.
September 13	The Super Mario series celebrated its 15th anniversary in Japan.
October 7–15	The World Cyber Games Challenge takes place in South Korea.
November 12	The Sega World Sydney amusement park closes its doors for good after three years of operation.
December 15	Nvidia acquires 3dfx Interactive.
Unknown	British Academy of Film and Television Arts (BAFTA) hosts its third annual BAFTA Interactive Entertainment Awards for multimedia technologies; 7 of 20 awards went to video games. David Bowie was awarded, in part, for his contributions to the video game Omikron: The Nomad Soul.
Unknown	Mattel sells The Learning Company to Gores Technology Group.
Unknown	All of Sega's internal consumer research & development divisions become individual developer companies.
Unknown	21-6 Productions was formed.
Unknown	PopCap Games was formed.
Unknown	Yeti Interactive was formed.
Unknown	Team Liquid was formed.

== Games released in 2000 ==
Release date	Title	Platform	Genre	Developer	Publisher	Ref.
January 24	Crazy Taxi	DC				
January 24	Mario Party 2	N64				
January 27	Dragon Warrior Monsters	GBC				
January 31	Nox	WIN				
February 3	Resident Evil – Code: Veronica	DC				
February 4	The Sims	WIN, MAC				
February 10	Vagrant Story	PS1				
February 19	SNK Gals' Fighters	NGPC				
February 29	BattleSphere	JAG				
February 29	Dead or Alive 2	DC				
February 29	Need for Speed: Porsche Unleashed	WIN, PS1				
February 29	Pokémon Stadium	N64				
February 29	Rayman 2: The Great Escape	DC				
February 29	Sword of the Berserk: Guts' Rage	DC				
March 2	WWF SmackDown!	PS1				
March 4	Kessen	PS2				
March 21	Wario Land 3	GBC				
March 23	Thief II: The Metal Age	WIN				
March 24	Kirby 64: The Crystal Shards	N64				
March 27	Soldier of Fortune	WIN				
March 30	Dead or Alive 2	PS2				
March 30	Final Fight Revenge	SAT				
March 30	Tekken Tag Tournament	PS2				
March 31	MDK2	WIN, DC				
March 31	Starlancer	WIN, DC				
March 31	Tech Romancer	DC				
April 4	Star Wars Episode I: Racer	DC				
April 27	The Legend of Zelda: Majora's Mask	N64				
April 28	Gundam Side Story 0079: Rise from the Ashes	DC				
April 30	Excitebike 64	N64				
April 30	The Misadventures of Tron Bonne	PS1				
April 30	Wild Arms 2	PS1				
May 4	4 Wheel Thunder	DC				
May 5	Metal Gear: Ghost Babel	GBC				
May 9	Tom Clancy's Rainbow Six	DC				
May 14	Bomberman Max	GBC				
May 16	SimCity 3000 Unlimited	WIN				
May 22	Earth 2150	WIN				
May 22	Metal Slug 2nd Mission	NGPC				
May 22	Perfect Dark	N64				
May 24	Daikatana	WIN				
May 28	Bomberman 64: The Second Attack	N64				
June 1	Evolva	WIN				
June 1	Ground Control	WIN				
June 4	Space Channel 5	DC				
June 7	Dracula: Resurrection	WIN				
June 7	Vampire: The Masquerade - Redemption	WIN				
June 12	Tomb Raider	GBC				
June 13	The Legend Of Dragoon	PS1				
June 13	Shogun: Total War	WIN				
June 22	Draconus: Cult of the Wyrm	DC				
June 22	Omikron: The Nomad Soul	DC				
June 23	Deus Ex	WIN, MAC				
June 28	Diablo II	WIN, MAC				
June 28	Xtreme Sports	GBC				
June 29	Icewind Dale	WIN				
June 29	Jet Set Radio	DC				
June 29	Marvel vs Capcom 2	DC				
June 29	Persona 2: Eternal Punishment (JP)	PS1				
June 30	Homeworld: Cataclysm	WIN				
June 30	Mortal Kombat: Special Forces	PS1				
July 3	Dark Reign 2	WIN				
July 13	Guilty Gear X	WIN, Arcade				
July 18	Threads of Fate	PS1				
July 26	The King of Fighters 2000	WIN, DC, PS2, Arcade				
July 29	Strider 2	PS1				
July 31	Spirit of Speed 1937	WIN, DC				
August 1	Arcatera: The Dark Brotherhood	WIN				
August 1	Heavy Metal: F.A.K.K. 2	WIN, MAC				
August 3	Dynasty Warriors 2 (JP)	PS2				
August 15	Chrono Cross	PS1				
August 24	Age of Empires II: The Conquerors	WIN				
August 26	Dragon Quest VII (JP)	PS1				
August 28	Mario Tennis	N64				
August 30	WWF Royal Rumble	DC				
September 1	Spider-Man	WIN, PS1, GBC, N64				
September 12	Parasite Eve II	PS1				
September 13	Lego Stunt Rally	WIN				
September 15	Star Trek: Voyager – Elite Force	WIN				
September 19	Tony Hawk's Pro Skater 2	WIN, PS1, DC, GBC				
September 24	Baldur's Gate II: Shadows of Amn	WIN				
September 24	The Little Mermaid 2: Pinball Frenzy	GBC				
September 25	Buffy the Vampire Slayer	GBC				
September 25	Vampire Hunter D	PS1				
September 26	Destruction Derby Raw	PS1				
September 26	NHL 2001	WIN, PS2				
September 27	Dragon Warrior I & II	GBC				
September 28	F1 Championship Season 2000	WIN, PS1, PS2, GBC				
October 4	Blair Witch Volume I: Rustin Parr	WIN				
October 5	Skies of Arcadia	DC				
October 15	Pokémon Gold and Silver	GBC				
October 16	Zeus: Master of Olympus (NA)	WIN				
October 19	Donald Duck: Goin' Quackers	WIN, PS1, N64, PS2, DC, GBC				
October 22	Quake III Arena	DC				
October 24	Mega Man Legends 2	WIN, PS1				
October 25	Command & Conquer: Red Alert 2	WIN				
October 25	Spyro: Year of the Dragon	PS1				
October 26	DOA2 Hardcore	PS2				
October 26	FantaVision	PS2				
October 26	Madden NFL 2001	PS2				
October 26	Midnight Club: Street Racing	PS2				
October 26	Ridge Racer V	PS2				
October 26	SSX	PS2				
October 26	TimeSplitters	PS2				
October 27	Bust-a-Move Millennium	GBC				
October 27	Rune	WIN, MAC, LIN, PS2				
October 31	The Grinch	DC				
November 6	Capcom vs. SNK: Millennium Fight 2000	DC				
November 6	Crash Bash	PS1				
November 6	Incredible Crisis	PS1				
November 6	Shenmue	DC				
November 6	The World Is Not Enough	WIN, PS1, N64, GBC				
November 8	Escape from Monkey Island	WIN				
November 9	Counter-Strike	WIN				
November 9	The Operative: No One Lives Forever	WIN				
November 10	Timeline	WIN				
November 13	The Emperor's New Groove	WIN, PS1, GBC				
November 13	Final Fantasy IX	PS1				
November 13	Madden NFL 2001	GBC				
November 14	Dexter's Laboratory: Robot Rampage	GBC				
November 14	The Powerpuff Girls: Bad Mojo Jojo	GBC				
November 14	Sonic Shuffle	DC				
November 14	WWF No Mercy	N64				
November 16	Blues Brothers 2000	N64				
November 17	Sacrifice	WIN				
November 17	Sky Odyssey	PS2				
November 17	Tomb Raider: Chronicles	WIN, PS1, DC				
November 17	Zeus: Master of Olympus (EU)	WIN				
November 19	Hitman: Codename 47	WIN				
November 20	007 Racing	PS1				
November 20	Banjo-Tooie	N64				
November 20	Batman Beyond: Return of the Joker	PS1, GBC				
November 20	Dave Mirra Freestyle BMX	DC				
November 21	WWF SmackDown! 2: Know Your Role	PS1				
November 22	Harvest Moon: Back to Nature	PS1				
November 23	MechWarrior 4: Vengeance	WIN, Arcade				
November 23	Star Trek: Deep Space Nine: The Fallen	WIN				
November 24	Nancy Drew: Message in a Haunted Mansion	WIN				
November 30	Godzilla: The Series: Monster Wars	GBC				
November 30	Scooby-Doo! Classic Creep Capers	WIN, N64				
December 1	Crime Cities	WIN				
December 1	Disney's Aladdin in Nasira's Revenge	WIN, PS1				
December 4	Evil Dead: Hail to the King	PS1				
December 4	Pokémon Puzzle Challenge	GBC				
December 6	American McGee's Alice	WIN				
December 6	Grandia II	DC				
December 7	Giants: Citizen Kabuto	WIN				
December 7	Mario Party 3 (JP)	N64				
December 7	Project Justice	DC, Arcade				
December 10	Monster Rancher Hop-A-Bout	PS1				
December 13	Batman Beyond: Return of the Joker	N64				
December 14	Dark Cloud (JP)	PS2				
December 14	Pokémon Crystal (JP)	GBC				
December 21	Phantasy Star Online (JP)	DC				
December 22	Persona 2: Eternal Punishment (NA)	PS1				
December 30	ECW Anarchy Rulz	DC				

== See also ==
- 2000 in games
