= D.I.C.E. Award for Game of the Year =

Annual video game award

- Country: United States
- Presented by: Academy of Interactive Arts & Sciences
- First award: 1998
- Currently held by: Clair Obscur: Expedition 33
- Website: interactive.org

The D.I.C.E. Award for Game of the Year is an award presented annually by the Academy of Interactive Arts & Sciences during the D.I.C.E. Awards. It is given in honor of "the single game, without regard to system or delivery mechanism, voted by the membership of the Academy of Interactive Arts & Sciences that best utilizes the chosen medium to entertain users". All active creative/technical, business, and affiliate members of the Academy are qualified to vote for this category.

The most recent winner of the award is Clair Obscur: Expedition 33, developed by Sandfall Interactive and published by Kepler Interactive.

== History ==
=== Category name changes ===
The 1st Annual Interactive Achievement Awards ceremony was held on May 28, 1998, with the licensed adaptation of GoldenEye 007, developed by Rare and published by Nintendo, receiving the first award. The award was originally known as Interactive Title of the Year for the 1998 ceremony. It would be renamed Game of the Year at the following year's awards ceremony. For a brief period between 2006 and 2009, the award was presented as Overall Game of the Year.

=== Indie Games ===
The first indie that was nominated for Game of the Year was Angry Birds HD, while Journey was the first indie game winner. The only other indie games that had won were Untitled Goose Game, Hades, and Clair Obscur: Expedition 33. On a yearly basis since 2016, there had been at least one indie game nominee for Game of the Year:

- 2016: Ori and the Blind Forest
- 2017: Inside
- 2018: Cuphead
- 2019: Into the Breach, Return of the Obra Dinn
- 2020: Disco Elysium, Outer Wilds, Untitled Goose Game
- 2021: Hades
- 2022: Inscryption
- 2023: Stray, Vampire Survivors
- 2024: Cocoon
- 2025: Balatro
- 2026: Blue Prince, Clair Obscur: Expedition 33, Dispatch

2019, 2020, 2023 and 2026 were the only years that had more than one indie game nominee, with 2020 and 2026 being the years of indie games majority.

=== Genres ===
The most frequently nominated and winning genres for Game of the Year had been action, adventure, and role-playing games. No strategy game had ever won the award, but fourteen had been nominated: Age of Empires, Sid Meier's Alpha Centauri, Age of Empires II: The Age of Kings, Age of Empires II: The Conquerors, Command & Conquer: Red Alert 2, Sacrifice, Sid Meier's Civilization III, Command & Conquer: Generals, Rise of Nations, XCOM: Enemy Unknown, Hearthstone, Into the Breach, Inscryption, and Balatro. The Sims was the only simulation game to win the top award, with six others also being nominated: MechWarrior 4: Vengeance, RollerCoaster Tycoon: Loopy Landscapes, Black & White, Animal Crossing, Nintendogs, and Animal Crossing: New Horizons. Four rhythm games had been nominated: PaRappa the Rapper, Guitar Hero, Guitar Hero II, and Rock Band. The only fighting games that had been nominated were Soulcalibur, Tekken Tag Tournament, and WWF No Mercy. The awards ceremony in 2001 had six sports game nominees: FIFA 2001, Links 2001, Madden NFL 2001, SSX, Tony Hawk's Pro Skater 2, and Virtua Tennis; SSX 3 and Wii Sports were the only sports games nominated after 2001. Only three expansion packs had ever been nominated (all during the awards ceremony in 2001): Age of Empires II: The Conquerors, EverQuest: The Ruins of Kunark, and RollerCoaster Tycoon: Loopy Landscapes. The only compilation pack that received a nomination for Game of the Year was The Orange Box (which included Half-Life 2: Episode Two, Portal, and Team Fortress 2, as well as previously released titles of Half-Life 2 and Half-Life 2: Episode One).

=== Platforms ===
Nearly every Game of the Year nominee had either been released for a home video game console or for personal computer. Pokémon Yellow, Nintendogs, and The Legend of Zelda: A Link Between Worlds were the only nominees that were released for handheld game consoles. There had been six nominees that were released for mobile devices at the time of their nomination: Angry Birds HD, The Walking Dead, Hearthstone, Pokémon Go, Vampire Survivors, and Balatro. Journey, Borderlands 2, XCOM: Enemy Unknown, Inside, PlayerUnknown's Battlegrounds, Into the Breach, Disco Elysium, and Hades would eventually be released for mobile devices, but they were not at the time of their nomination.

=== Other Game of the Year Awards ===
Usually the winner for Game of the Year would also win the award for their respective genre/platform category; the only exceptions had been The Sims, Battlefield 1942, Untitled Goose Game, and It Takes Two. Of the four exceptions, Battlefield 1942 and Untitled Goose Game did not receive any nominations for their respective genre-related category (although the former did win the award for Online Gameplay of the Year, while the latter won for Outstanding Achievement for an Independent Game). There had been seven winners for Family Game of the Year that were also nominated for Game of the Year: Guitar Hero, Guitar Hero II, Rock Band, LittleBigPlanet, Animal Crossing: New Horizons, Ratchet & Clank: Rift Apart, and Astro Bot, with LittleBigPlanet and Astro Bot being the only winners for Game of the Year. Angry Birds HD and Journey were the only winners for Casual Game of the Year that were also nominated for Game of the Year; the latter game won both awards.

== List of Winners and nominees ==
=== 1990s ===
Table key
Indicates the winner

Year	Game	Developer(s)	Publisher(s)	Ref.
1997/1998 (Note: Awarded as Interactive Title of the Year) (1st)	GoldenEye 007	Rare	Nintendo	
1997/1998 (1st)	Age of Empires	Ensemble Studios	Microsoft	
1997/1998 (1st)	Blade Runner	Westwood Studios	Virgin Interactive	
1997/1998 (1st)	Final Fantasy VII	SquareSoft	Sony Computer Entertainment	
1997/1998 (1st)	PaRappa the Rapper	NanaOn-Sha	Sony Computer Entertainment	
1997/1998 (1st)	Quake II	id Software	Activision	
1997/1998 (1st)	Riven: The Sequel to Myst	Cyan Worlds	Red Orb Entertainment	
1997/1998 (1st)	Turok: Dinosaur Hunter	Iguana Entertainment	Acclaim Entertainment	
1998/1999 (2nd)	The Legend of Zelda: Ocarina of Time	Nintendo EAD	Nintendo	
1998/1999 (2nd)	Banjo-Kazooie	Rare	Nintendo	
1998/1999 (2nd)	Grim Fandango	LucasArts	LucasArts	
1998/1999 (2nd)	Half-Life	Valve	Sierra Studios	
1998/1999 (2nd)	Metal Gear Solid	Konami	Konami	
1998/1999 (2nd)	Sid Meier's Alpha Centauri	Firaxis Games	Electronic Arts	
1998/1999 (2nd)	Star Wars: Rogue Squadron	Factor 5, LucasArts	LucasArts	
1999/2000 (3rd)	The Sims	Maxis	Electronic Arts	
1999/2000 (3rd)	Age of Empires II: The Age of Kings	Ensemble Studios	Microsoft	
1999/2000 (3rd)	Donkey Kong 64	Rare	Nintendo	
1999/2000 (3rd)	Pokémon Yellow	Game Freak	Nintendo	
1999/2000 (3rd)	Soulcalibur	Project Soul	Namco	
1999/2000 (3rd)	Unreal Tournament	Epic Games, Digital Extremes	GT Interactive	

=== 2000s ===
Year	Game	Developer(s)	Publisher(s)	Ref.
2000 (Note: Finalists included all nominees for Console Game of the Year and Computer Game of the Year.) (4th)	Diablo II	Blizzard North	Blizzard Entertainment	
2000 (4th)	Age of Empires II: The Conquerors	Ensemble Studios	Microsoft	
2000 (4th)	Asheron's Call	Turbine Entertainment Software	Microsoft	
2000 (4th)	Baldur's Gate II: Shadows of Amn	BioWare	Interplay Entertainment	
2000 (4th)	Banjo-Tooie	Rare	Nintendo	
2000 (4th)	Chrono Cross	SquareSoft	Square Electronic Arts	
2000 (4th)	Command & Conquer: Red Alert 2	Westwood Pacific	Electronic Arts	
2000 (4th)	Deus Ex	Ion Storm	Eidos Interactive	
2000 (4th)	Disney's Magic Artist 3D	Disney Interactive	Disney Interactive	
2000 (4th)	EverQuest: The Ruins of Kunark	Verant Interactive	Sony Online Entertainment	
2000 (4th)	FIFA 2001	EA Canada	Electronic Arts	
2000 (4th)	Final Fantasy IX	SquareSoft	Square Electronic Arts	
2000 (4th)	Jet Grind Radio	Smilebit	Sega	
2000 (4th)	Links 2001	Access Software	Microsoft	
2000 (4th)	Madden NFL 2001	EA Tiburon	Electronic Arts	
2000 (4th)	MechWarrior 4: Vengeance	FASA Interactive	Microsoft	
2000 (4th)	Rayman 2: The Great Escape	Ubi Pictures	Ubisoft	
2000 (4th)	RollerCoaster Tycoon: Loopy Landscapes	MicroProse	Hasbro Interactive	
2000 (4th)	Sacrifice	Shiny Entertainment	Interplay Entertainment	
2000 (4th)	Shenmue	Sega AM2	Sega	
2000 (4th)	Skies of Arcadia	Overworks	Sega	
2000 (4th)	Spyro: Year of the Dragon	Insomniac Games	Sony Computer Entertainment	
2000 (4th)	SSX	EA Canada	Electronic Arts	
2000 (4th)	Tekken Tag Tournament	Namco	Namco	
2000 (4th)	The Legend of Zelda: Majora's Mask	Nintendo EAD	Nintendo	
2000 (4th)	The Operative: No One Lives Forever	Monolith Productions	Fox Interactive	
2000 (4th)	Tony Hawk's Pro Skater 2	Neversoft	Activision	
2000 (4th)	Virtua Tennis	Sega AM3	Sega	
2000 (4th)	WWF No Mercy	AKI Corporation	THQ	
2001 (5th)	Halo: Combat Evolved	Bungie	Microsoft Game Studios	
2001 (5th)	Black & White	Lionhead Studios	Electronic Arts	
2001 (5th)	Ico	Japan Studio	Sony Computer Entertainment	
2001 (5th)	Sid Meier's Civilization III	Firaxis Games	Infogrames	
2002 (6th)	Battlefield 1942	DICE	Electronic Arts	
2002 (6th)	Animal Crossing	Nintendo EAD	Nintendo	
2002 (6th)	Grand Theft Auto: Vice City	Rockstar North	Rockstar Games	
2002 (6th)	Metroid Prime	Retro Studios	Nintendo	
2002 (6th)	Ratchet & Clank	Insomniac Games	Sony Computer Entertainment	
2003 (7th)	Call of Duty	Infinity Ward	Activision	
2003 (7th)	Command & Conquer: Generals	EA Pacific	Electronic Arts	
2003 (7th)	Max Payne 2: The Fall of Max Payne	Remedy Entertainment	Rockstar Games	
2003 (7th)	Prince of Persia: The Sands of Time	Ubisoft Montreal	Ubisoft	
2003 (7th)	Ratchet & Clank: Going Commando	Insomniac Games	Sony Computer Entertainment	
2003 (7th)	Rise of Nations	Big Huge Games	Microsoft Game Studios	
2003 (7th)	SSX 3	EA Canada	Electronic Arts	
2003 (7th)	Star Wars: Knights of the Old Republic	BioWare	LucasArts	
2003 (7th)	The Legend of Zelda: The Wind Waker	Nintendo EAD	Nintendo	
2004 (8th)	Half-Life 2	Valve	Vivendi Universal Games	
2004 (8th)	Grand Theft Auto: San Andreas	Rockstar North	Rockstar Games	
2004 (8th)	Halo 2	Bungie	Microsoft Game Studios	
2004 (8th)	Katamari Damacy	Namco	Namco	
2004 (8th)	World of Warcraft	Blizzard Entertainment	Vivendi Universal Games	
2005 (Note: Awarded as Overall Game of the Year) (9th)	God of War	Santa Monica Studio	Sony Computer Entertainment	
2005 (9th)	Call of Duty 2	Infinity Ward	Activision	
2005 (9th)	Guitar Hero	Harmonix	RedOctane	
2005 (9th)	Nintendogs	Nintendo EAD	Nintendo	
2005 (9th)	Shadow of the Colossus	Japan Studio	Sony Computer Entertainment	
2006 (10th)	Gears of War	Epic Games	Microsoft Game Studios	
2006 (10th)	Guitar Hero II	Harmonix	RedOctane	
2006 (10th)	The Elder Scrolls IV: Oblivion	Bethesda Game Studios	2K Games	
2006 (10th)	The Legend of Zelda: Twilight Princess	Nintendo EAD	Nintendo	
2006 (10th)	Wii Sports	Nintendo EAD	Nintendo	
2007 (11th)	Call of Duty 4: Modern Warfare	Infinity Ward	Activision	
2007 (11th)	BioShock	2K Boston, 2K Australia	2K Games	
2007 (11th)	Rock Band	Harmonix	MTV Games	
2007 (11th)	Super Mario Galaxy	Nintendo EAD	Nintendo	
2007 (11th)	The Orange Box	Valve	Valve, Electronic Arts	
2008 (12th)	LittleBigPlanet	Media Molecule	Sony Computer Entertainment	
2008 (12th)	Fallout 3	Bethesda Game Studios	Bethesda Softworks	
2008 (12th)	Grand Theft Auto IV	Rockstar North	Rockstar Games	
2008 (12th)	Left 4 Dead	Valve South	Valve	
2008 (12th)	Metal Gear Solid 4: Guns of the Patriots	Kojima Productions	Konami	
2009 (13th)	Uncharted 2: Among Thieves	Naughty Dog	Sony Computer Entertainment	
2009 (13th)	Assassin's Creed II	Ubisoft Montreal	Ubisoft	
2009 (13th)	Batman: Arkham Asylum	Rocksteady Studios	Warner Bros. Interactive Entertainment	
2009 (13th)	Call of Duty: Modern Warfare 2	Infinity Ward	Activision	
2009 (13th)	Dragon Age: Origins	BioWare	Electronic Arts	

=== 2010s ===
Year	Game	Developer(s)	Publisher(s)	Ref.
2010 (14th)	Mass Effect 2	BioWare	Electronic Arts	
2010 (14th)	Angry Birds HD	Rovio Entertainment	Chillingo	
2010 (14th)	Call of Duty: Black Ops	Treyarch	Activision	
2010 (14th)	God of War III	Santa Monica Studio	Sony Computer Entertainment	
2010 (14th)	Red Dead Redemption	Rockstar San Diego	Rockstar Games	
2011 (15th)	The Elder Scrolls V: Skyrim	Bethesda Game Studios	Bethesda Softworks	
2011 (15th)	Batman: Arkham City	Rocksteady Studios	Warner Bros. Interactive Entertainment	
2011 (15th)	Portal 2	Valve	Valve	
2011 (15th)	The Legend of Zelda: Skyward Sword	Nintendo EAD	Nintendo	
2011 (15th)	Uncharted 3: Drake's Deception	Naughty Dog	Sony Computer Entertainment	
2012 (16th)	Journey	thatgamecompany	Sony Computer Entertainment	
2012 (16th)	Borderlands 2	Gearbox Software	2K Games	
2012 (16th)	Far Cry 3	Ubisoft Montreal	Ubisoft	
2012 (16th)	The Walking Dead	Telltale Games	Telltale Games	
2012 (16th)	XCOM: Enemy Unknown	Firaxis Games	2K Games	
2013 (17th)	The Last of Us	Naughty Dog	Sony Computer Entertainment	
2013 (17th)	Assassin's Creed IV: Black Flag	Ubisoft Montreal	Ubisoft	
2013 (17th)	BioShock Infinite	Irrational Games	2K Games	
2013 (17th)	Grand Theft Auto V	Rockstar North	Rockstar Games	
2013 (17th)	The Legend of Zelda: A Link Between Worlds	Nintendo EAD	Nintendo	
2014 (18th)	Dragon Age: Inquisition	BioWare	Electronic Arts	
2014 (18th)	Destiny	Bungie	Activision	
2014 (18th)	Far Cry 4	Ubisoft Montreal	Ubisoft	
2014 (18th)	Hearthstone: Heroes of Warcraft	Blizzard Entertainment	Blizzard Entertainment	
2014 (18th)	Middle-earth: Shadow of Mordor	Monolith Productions	Warner Bros. Interactive Entertainment	
2015 (19th)	Fallout 4	Bethesda Game Studios	Bethesda Softworks	
2015 (19th)	Bloodborne	FromSoftware	Sony Computer Entertainment	
2015 (19th)	Ori and the Blind Forest	Moon Studios	Microsoft Studios	
2015 (19th)	Rise of the Tomb Raider	Crystal Dynamics	Square Enix Europe	
2015 (19th)	The Witcher 3: Wild Hunt	CD Projekt Red	CD Projekt	
2016 (20th)	Overwatch	Blizzard Entertainment	Blizzard Entertainment	
2016 (20th)	Battlefield 1	DICE	Electronic Arts	
2016 (20th)	Inside	Playdead	Playdead	
2016 (20th)	Pokémon Go	Niantic	Niantic	
2016 (20th)	Uncharted 4: A Thief's End	Naughty Dog	Sony Interactive Entertainment	
2017 (21st)	The Legend of Zelda: Breath of the Wild	Nintendo EPD	Nintendo	
2017 (21st)	Cuphead	Studio MDHR	Studio MDHR	
2017 (21st)	Horizon Zero Dawn	Guerrilla Games	Sony Interactive Entertainment	
2017 (21st)	PlayerUnknown's Battlegrounds	PUBG Corporation	Bluehole	
2017 (21st)	Super Mario Odyssey	Nintendo EPD	Nintendo	
2018 (22nd)	God of War	Santa Monica Studio	Sony Interactive Entertainment	
2018 (22nd)	Into the Breach	Subset Games	Subset Games	
2018 (22nd)	Marvel's Spider-Man	Insomniac Games	Sony Interactive Entertainment	
2018 (22nd)	Red Dead Redemption 2	Rockstar Games	Rockstar Games	
2018 (22nd)	Return of the Obra Dinn	Lucas Pope	3909	
2019 (23rd)	Untitled Goose Game	House House	Panic Inc.	
2019 (23rd)	Control	Remedy Entertainment	505 Games	
2019 (23rd)	Death Stranding	Kojima Productions	Sony Interactive Entertainment	
2019 (23rd)	Disco Elysium	ZA/UM	ZA/UM	
2019 (23rd)	Outer Wilds	Mobius Digital	Annapurna Interactive	

=== 2020s ===
Year	Game	Developer(s)	Publisher(s)	Ref.
2020 (24th)	Hades	Supergiant Games	Supergiant Games	
2020 (24th)	Animal Crossing: New Horizons	Nintendo EPD	Nintendo	
2020 (24th)	Final Fantasy VII Remake	Square Enix	Square Enix	
2020 (24th)	Ghost of Tsushima	Sucker Punch Productions	Sony Interactive Entertainment	
2020 (24th)	The Last of Us Part II	Naughty Dog	Sony Interactive Entertainment	
2021 (25th)	It Takes Two	Hazelight Studios	Electronic Arts	
2021 (25th)	Deathloop	Arkane Studios	Bethesda Softworks	
2021 (25th)	Inscryption	Daniel Mullins Games	Devolver Digital	
2021 (25th)	Ratchet & Clank: Rift Apart	Insomniac Games	Sony Interactive Entertainment	
2021 (25th)	Returnal	Housemarque	Sony Interactive Entertainment	
2022 (26th)	Elden Ring	FromSoftware	Bandai Namco Entertainment	
2022 (26th)	God of War Ragnarök	Santa Monica Studio	Sony Interactive Entertainment	
2022 (26th)	Horizon Forbidden West	Guerrilla Games	Sony Interactive Entertainment	
2022 (26th)	Stray	BlueTwelve Studios	Annapurna Interactive	
2022 (26th)	Vampire Survivors	poncle	poncle	
2023 (27th)	Baldur's Gate 3	Larian Studios	Larian Studios	
2023 (27th)	Alan Wake 2	Remedy Entertainment	Epic Games	
2023 (27th)	Cocoon	Geometric Interactive	Annapurna Interactive	
2023 (27th)	Marvel's Spider-Man 2	Insomniac Games	Sony Interactive Entertainment	
2023 (27th)	The Legend of Zelda: Tears of the Kingdom	Nintendo EPD	Nintendo	
2024 (28th)	Astro Bot	Team Asobi	Sony Interactive Entertainment	
2024 (28th)	Balatro	LocalThunk	Playstack	
2024 (28th)	Black Myth: Wukong	Game Science	Game Science	
2024 (28th)	Helldivers 2	Arrowhead Game Studios	Sony Interactive Entertainment	
2024 (28th)	Indiana Jones and the Great Circle	MachineGames	Bethesda Softworks	
2025 (29th)	Clair Obscur: Expedition 33	Sandfall Interactive	Kepler Interactive	
2025 (29th)	ARC Raiders	Embark Studios	Embark Studios	
2025 (29th)	Blue Prince	Dogubomb	Raw Fury	
2025 (29th)	Dispatch	AdHoc Studio	AdHoc Studio	
2025 (29th)	Ghost of Yōtei	Sucker Punch Productions	Sony Interactive Entertainment	

== Multiple nominations and wins ==
Nintendo EAD/EPD has developed the most Game of the Year nominees with fourteen. Nintendo EAD/EPD is also tied with Infinity Ward, Santa Monica Studio, Naughty Dog, BioWare, and Bethesda Game Studios for each developing two Game of the Year winners, being the most of any developer. Developer Insomniac Games has the most nominations without a win.

Sony has published the most Game of the Year nominees and winners. Sony has two back-to-back wins for Game of the Year; the first for LittleBigPlanet in 2009 and Uncharted 2: Among Thieves in 2010, and the second time for Journey in 2013 and The Last of Us in 2014. The only other publisher with back-to-back wins is Nintendo with GoldenEye 007 in 1998, and The Legend of Zelda: Ocarina of Time in 1999. Rockstar Games has published the most Game of the Year nominees without having a single winner.

Developers
Developer	Nominations	Wins
Nintendo EAD/EPD	14	2
BioWare	5	2
Naughty Dog	5	2
Bethesda Game Studios	4	2
Infinity Ward	4	2
Santa Monica Studio	4	2
Rare	4	1
Valve	4	1
Blizzard Entertainment	3	1
Bungie	3	1
DICE	2	1
Epic Games	2	1
FromSoftware	2	1
Insomniac Games	6	0
Ubisoft Montreal	5	0
Rockstar North	4	0
SquareSoft/Square Enix	4	0
EA Canada	3	0
Ensemble Studios	3	0
Firaxis Games	3	0
Harmonix	3	0
Remedy Entertainment	3	0
Guerrilla Games	2	0
2K Boston/Irrational Games	2	0
LucasArts	2	0
Japan Studio	2	0
Kojima Productions	2	0
Monolith Productions	2	0
Namco	2	0
Rocksteady Studios	2	0
Sega AM2/AM3	2	0
Sucker Punch Productions	2	0
Westwood Pacific/EA Pacific	2	0

Publishers
Publisher	Nominations	Wins
Sony Interactive Entertainment	31	7
Electronic Arts	18	5
Nintendo	20	3
Microsoft/Xbox Game Studios	11	2
Activision	8	2
Bethesda Softworks	5	2
Blizzard Entertainment	3	2
Namco/Bandai Namco Entertainment	4	1
Vivendi Universal Games	2	1
Rockstar Games	7	0
Ubisoft	6	0
2K Games	5	0
Sega	4	0
SquareSoft/Square Enix	4	0
Annapurna Interactive	3	0
LucasArts	3	0
Valve	3	0
Warner Bros. Interactive Entertainment	3	0
Interplay Entertainment	2	0
Konami	2	0
RedOctane	2	0

=== Franchises ===
The most nominated franchise is The Legend of Zelda, with eight nominations. Call of Duty, The Legend of Zelda, and God of War are the only franchises to have won Game of the Year twice. The Grand Theft Auto franchise has garnered the most nominations without winning a single award in this category. Final Fantasy VII Remake is the first and only remake that has been nominated, let alone a remake of a previous nominee.

Franchises
Franchise	Nominations	Wins
The Legend of Zelda	8	2
Call of Duty	5	2
God of War	4	2
Half-Life (Note: includes Half-Life 2: Episode Two as part of The Orange Box.)	3	1
Uncharted	3	1
Baldur's Gate	2	1
Battlefield	2	1
Dragon Age	2	1
Fallout	2	1
Halo	2	1
The Elder Scrolls	2	1
The Last of Us	2	1
Grand Theft Auto	4	0
Age of Empires	3	0
Final Fantasy	3	0
Ratchet & Clank	3	0
Animal Crossing	2	0
Assassin's Creed	2	0
Banjo-Kazooie	2	0
Batman: Arkham	2	0
BioShock	2	0
Command & Conquer	2	0
Far Cry	2	0
Ghost	2	0
Guitar Hero	2	0
Horizon	2	0
Marvel's Spider-Man	2	0
Metal Gear	2	0
Pokémon	2	0
Portal (Note: includes the original Portal as part of The Orange Box.)	2	0
Red Dead	2	0
Sid Meier	2	0
SSX	2	0
Star Wars	2	0
Super Mario	2	0
Warcraft	2	0
