= 4th Annual Interactive Achievement Awards =

Video game award ceremony

- Date: March 22, 2001
- Venue: Polly Esther's
- Country: San Jose, California, USA
- Hosted by: Martin Lewis

Highlights
- Most awards: SSX (5)
- Most nominations: Jet Grind Radio (8)
- Game of the Year: Diablo II
- Hall of Fame: John Carmack

The 4th Annual Interactive Achievement Awards was the 4th edition of the Interactive Achievement Awards, an annual awards event that honored the best games in the video game industry during the last ten months of 2000. The awards were arranged by the Academy of Interactive Arts & Sciences (AIAS) and were held at Polly Esther's in San Jose, California on March 22, 2001. It was hosted by Martin Lewis, and featured presenters included Scott Campbell, Louis Castle, Tony Goodman, Lorne Lanning, Sid Meier, Ray Muzyka, Gabe Newell, Chris Taylor, Will Wright, and Greg Zeschuk.

Innovation awards for console gaming and PC gaming were introduced. The console and PC awards for "Action" and "Adventure/Role-Playing" were replaced with "Action/Adventure" and "Role-Playing". Both console and PC awards had a "Family Title of the Year" game category. "Online Game of the Year" was relabeled as "Online Gameplay of the Year". This was the first year online awards for websites were not offered. The category for "Massive Multiplayer/Persistent World Game of the Year" was also introduced. This was the final year games could be nominated for more than one console or PC genre award.

Diablo II won the ceremony's top honor with "Game of the Year". The PlayStation 2 launch title SSX ended up winning the most awards at the event. Jet Grind Radio received the most nominations, but did not win a single award. Electronic Arts received the most nominations and won the most awards, some of which were for publishing SquareSoft games outside of Japan. Electronic Arts also had the most nominated games and the most award-winning games. There was also a tie between FIFA 2001 and Motocross Madness 2 for "PC Sports Game of the Year". EA Canada was the only developer with more than one award-winning game.

John Carmack, lead programmer of id Software titles Wolfenstein 3D, Doom, and Quake, was inducted into the Academy of Interactive Arts & Sciences Hall of Fame.

== Winners and Nominees ==
Winners are listed first, highlighted in boldface, and indicated with a double dagger (‡).

**Game of the Year (Note: Includes all finalists for Console Game of the Year and PC Game of the Year.)**
- **Diablo II** — **Blizzard North, Blizzard Entertainment**‡
  - Age of Empires II: The Conquerors — Ensemble Studios, Microsoft
  - Asheron's Call — Turbine, Microsoft
  - Baldur's Gate II: Shadows of Amn — BioWare, Black Isle Studios, Interplay Entertainment
  - Banjo-Tooie — Rare, Nintendo
  - Chrono Cross — SquareSoft, Square Electronic Arts
  - Command & Conquer: Red Alert 2 — Westwood Pacific, Electronic Arts
  - Deus Ex — Ion Storm, Eidos Interactive
  - Disney's Magic Artist 3D — Disney Interactive
  - EverQuest: The Ruins of Kunark — Verant Interactive, Sony Online Entertainment
  - FIFA 2001 — EA Canada
  - Final Fantasy IX — SquareSoft, Square Electronic Arts
  - Jet Grind Radio — Smilebit, Sega
  - Links 2001 — Access Software, Microsoft
  - Madden NFL 2001 — EA Tiburon
  - MechWarrior 4: Vengeance — FASA Interactive, Microsoft
  - Rayman 2: The Great Escape — Ubisoft
  - RollerCoaster Tycoon: Loopy Landscapes — MicroProse, Hasbro Interactive
  - Sacrifice — Shiny Entertainment, Interplay Entertainment
  - Shenmue — Sega AM2
  - Skies of Arcadia — Overworks, Sega
  - Spyro: Year of the Dragon — Insomniac Games, Sony Computer Entertainment
  - SSX — EA Canada
  - Tekken Tag Tournament — Namco
  - The Legend of Zelda: Majora's Mask — Nintendo EAD
  - The Operative: No One Lives Forever — Monolith Productions, Fox Interactive
  - Tony Hawk's Pro Skater 2 — Neversoft, Activision
  - Virtua Tennis — Sega AM-3
  - WWF No Mercy — AKI Corporation, THQ

=== Craft Awards ===
**Outstanding Achievement in Game Design**: **The Legend of Zelda: Majora's Mask** — **Nintendo EAD**‡; Jet Grind Radio — Smilebit, Sega; Rayman 2: The Great Escape — Ubisoft; Shenmue — Sega AM2; Tony Hawk's Pro Skater 2 — Neversoft, Activision	**Outstanding Achievement in Character or Story Development**: **Baldur's Gate II: Shadows of Amn** — **BioWare**, **Black Isle Studios**, **Interplay Entertainment**‡; Final Fantasy IX — SquareSoft, Square Electronic Arts; Shenmue — Sega AM2; Skies of Arcadia — Overworks, Sega
**Outstanding Achievement in Animation**: **Final Fantasy IX** — **SquareSoft**, **Square Electronic Arts**‡; Dead or Alive 2 — Team Ninja, Tecmo; Rayman 2: The Great Escape — Ubisoft; Space Channel 5 — United Game Artists, Sega; Tekken Tag Tournament — Namco	**Outstanding Achievement in Art Direction**: **Final Fantasy IX** — **SquareSoft**, **Square Electronic Arts**‡; Escape from Monkey Island — LucasArts; Jet Grind Radio — Smilebit, Sega; Spyro: Year of the Dragon — Insomniac Games, Sony Computer Entertainment
**Outstanding Achievement in Sound Design**: **Medal of Honor: Underground** — **DreamWorks Interactive**, **Electronic Arts**‡; Deus Ex — Ion Storm, Eidos Interactive; Jet Grind Radio — Smilebit, Sega; The Longest Journey — Funcom, IQ Media, Tri Synergy, Empire Interactive	**Outstanding Achievement in Original Musical Composition**: **Medal of Honor: Underground** — **DreamWorks Interactive**, **Electronic Arts**‡; Escape from Monkey Island — LucasArts; Final Fantasy IX — SquareSoft, Square Electronic Arts; Jet Grind Radio — Smilebit, Sega; SSX — EA Canada
**Outstanding Achievement in Game Play Engineering**: **SSX** — **EA Canada**‡; Baldur's Gate II: Shadows of Amn — BioWare, Black Isle Studios, Interplay Entertainment; The Operative: No One Lives Forever — Monolith Productions, Fox Interactive; Tony Hawk's Pro Skater 2 — Neversoft, Activision	**Outstanding Achievement in Visual Engineering**: **SSX** — **EA Canada**‡; FIFA 2001 — EA Canada; Jet Grind Radio — Smilebit, Sega; Motocross Madness 2 — Rainbow Studios, Microsoft

=== Console Awards ===
**Console Game of the Year**: **SSX** — **EA Canada**‡; Banjo-Tooie — Rare, Nintendo; Chrono Cross — SquareSoft, Square Electronic Arts; Final Fantasy IX — SquareSoft, Square Electronic Arts; Jet Grind Radio — Smilebit, Sega; Madden NFL 2001 — EA Tiburon; Rayman 2: The Great Escape — Ubisoft; Shenmue — Sega AM2; Skies of Arcadia — Overworks, Sega; Spyro: Year of the Dragon — Insomniac Games, Sony Computer Entertainment; Tekken Tag Tournament — Namco; The Legend of Zelda: Majora's Mask — Nintendo EAD; Tony Hawk's Pro Skater 2 — Neversoft, Activision; Virtua Tennis — Sega AM-3; WWF No Mercy — AKI Corporation, THQ	**Innovation in Console Gaming**: **Shenmue** — **Sega AM2**‡; Fantavision — SCE Japan Studio; Jet Grind Radio — Smilebit, Sega; Samba de Amigo — Sonic Team, Sega; Seaman — Vivarium, Sega; Space Channel 5 — United Game Artists, Sega
**Console Action/Adventure Game of the Year**: **The Legend of Zelda: Majora's Mask** — **Nintendo EAD**‡; Banjo-Tooie — Rare, Nintendo; Rayman 2: The Great Escape — Ubisoft; Spyro: Year of the Dragon — Insomniac Games, Sony Computer Entertainment; Vagrant Story — SquareSoft, Square Electronic Arts	**Console Role-Playing Game of the Year**: **Final Fantasy IX** — **SquareSoft**, **Square Electronic Arts**‡; Chrono Cross — SquareSoft, Square Electronic Arts; Skies of Arcadia — Overworks, Sega; The Legend of Dragoon — SCE Japan Studio
**Console Fighting Game of the Year**: **Dead or Alive 2** — **Team Ninja**, **Tecmo**‡; Ready 2 Rumble Boxing: Round 2 — Midway Studios San Diego, Midway Games; Tekken Tag Tournament — Namco; Ultimate Fighting Championship — Anchor Inc., Crave Entertainment; WWF No Mercy — AKI Corporation, THQ	**Console Racing Game of the Year**: **SSX** — **EA Canada**‡; F355 Challenge — Sega AM2; Ridge Racer V — Namco; San Francisco Rush 2049 — Midway Games
**Console Family Title of the Year**: **Mario Tennis** — **Camelot Software Planning**, **Nintendo**‡; Donkey Kong Country (Note: Game Boy Color version) — Rare, Nintendo; Hey You, Pikachu! — Ambrella, Nintendo; Pokémon Stadium — Nintendo EAD	**Console Sports Game of the Year**: **SSX** — **EA Canada**‡; Madden NFL 2001 — EA Tiburon; Tony Hawk's Pro Skater 2 — Neversoft, Activision; Virtua Tennis — Sega AM-3

=== Online Awards ===
**Online Gameplay of the Year**: **MechWarrior 4: Vengeance** — **FASA Interactive**, **Microsoft**‡; Clusterball — Daydream Software, RealNetworks; Command & Conquer: Red Alert 2 — Westwood Pacific, Electronic Arts; Ultima Online: Renaissance — Origin Systems, Electronic Arts	**Massive Multiplayer/Persistent World Game of the Year**: **EverQuest: The Ruins of Kunark** — **Verant Interactive**, **Sony Online Entertainment**‡; Allegiance — Microsoft Research; Asheron's Call — Turbine, Microsoft; Ultima Online: Renaissance — Origin Systems, Electronic Arts

=== PC Awards ===
**PC Game of the Year**: **Diablo II** — **Blizzard North, Blizzard Entertainment**‡; Age of Empires II: The Conquerors — Ensemble Studios, Microsoft; Asheron's Call — Turbine, Microsoft; Baldur's Gate II: Shadows of Amn — BioWare, Black Isle Studios, Interplay Entertainment; Command & Conquer: Red Alert 2 — Westwood Pacific, Electronic Arts; Deus Ex — Ion Storm, Eidos Interactive; Disney's Magic Artist 3D — Disney Interactive; EverQuest: The Ruins of Kunark — Verant Interactive, Sony Online Entertainment; FIFA 2001 — EA Canada; Links 2001 — Access Software, Microsoft; MechWarrior 4: Vengeance — FASA Interactive, Microsoft; RollerCoaster Tycoon: Loopy Landscapes — MicroProse, Hasbro Interactive; Sacrifice — Shiny Entertainment, Interplay Entertainment; The Operative: No One Lives Forever — Monolith Productions, Fox Interactive	**Innovation in Computer Gaming**: **Deus Ex** — **Ion Storm**, **Eidos Interactive**‡; Combat Mission: Beyond Overlord — Big Time Software, CDV Software; Crimson Skies — Zipper Interactive, Microsoft; Sacrifice — Shiny Entertainment, Interplay Entertainment; Shogun: Total War — Creative Assembly, Electronic Arts
**PC Family Title of the Year**: **Return of the Incredible Machine: Contraptions** — **Dynamix**, **Sierra On-Line**‡; Disney's Magic Artist 3D — Disney Interactive; Ernie's Adventures in Space — Sesame Workshop, Mattel Interactive; Tonka Digs N Rigs — Hasbro Interactive, ImageBuilder Software	**PC Action/Adventure Game of the Year**: **Deus Ex** — **Ion Storm**, **Eidos Interactive**‡; Crimson Skies — Zipper Interactive, Microsoft; Escape from Monkey Island — LucasArts; Star Trek: Voyager – Elite Force — Raven Software, Activision; The Operative: No One Lives Forever — Monolith Productions, Fox Interactive
**PC Role-Playing Game of the Year**: **Diablo II** — **Blizzard North, Blizzard Entertainment**‡; Baldur's Gate II: Shadows of Amn — BioWare, Black Isle Studios, Interplay Entertainment; Deus Ex — Ion Storm, Eidos Interactive; Icewind Dale — Black Isle Studios, Interplay Entertainment	**PC Simulation Game of the Year**: **MechWarrior 4: Vengeance** — **FASA Interactive**, **Microsoft**‡; Enemy Engaged: RAH-66 Comanche vs. KA-52 Hokum — Razorworks, Empire Interactive; Links 2001 — Access Software, Microsoft; Need for Speed: Porsche Unleashed — Eden Studios, EA Canada; RollerCoaster Tycoon: Loopy Landscapes — MicroProse, Hasbro Interactive
**PC Sports Game of the Year (Note: Tie between finalists.)**: **FIFA 2001** — **EA Canada**‡; **Motocross Madness 2** — **Rainbow Studios**, **Microsoft**‡; Championship Manager: Season 00/01 — Sports Interactive, Eidos Interactive; Links 2001 — Access Software, Microsoft	**PC Strategy Game of the Year**: **Age of Empires II: The Conquerors** — **Ensemble Studios**, **Microsoft**‡; Command & Conquer: Red Alert 2 — Westwood Pacific, Electronic Arts; Sacrifice — Shiny Entertainment, Interplay Entertainment; Zeus: Master of Olympus — Impressions Games, Sierra On-Line

=== Hall of Fame Award ===
- John Carmack

=== Multiple nominations and awards ===
==== Multiple Nominations ====
Games that received multiple nominations
Nominations	Game
8	Jet Grind Radio
7	Final Fantasy IX
7	SSX
6	Deus Ex
5	Baldur's Gate II: Shadows of Amn
5	Rayman 2: The Great Escape
5	Shenmue
5	Tony Hawk's Pro Skater 2
4	Command & Conquer: Red Alert 2
4	FIFA 2001
4	Links 2001
4	MechWarrior 4: Vengeance
4	Sacrifice
4	Skies of Arcadia
4	Spyro: Year of the Dragon
4	Tekken Tag Tournament
4	The Legend of Zelda: Majora's Mask
4	The Operative: No One Lives Forever
3	Age of Empires II: The Conquerors
3	Asheron's Call
3	Banjo-Tooie
3	Chrono Cross
3	Diablo II
3	Disney's Magic Artist 3D
3	Escape from Monkey Island
3	EverQuest: The Ruins of Kunark
3	Madden NFL 2001
3	RollerCoaster Tycoon: Loopy Landscapes
3	Virtua Tennis
3	WWF No Mercy
2	Crimson Skies
2	Dead or Alive 2
2	Medal of Honor: Underground
2	Motocross Madness 2
2	Space Channel 5
2	Ultima Online: Renaissance

Nominations by company
Nominations	Games	Company
35	11	Electronic Arts
25	8	Sega
19	7	Microsoft
11	6	Nintendo
11	3	SquareSoft
10	3	Interplay Entertainment
9	4	Sony Computer Entertainment
8	1	Smilebit
7	1	Eidos Interactive
6	2	Activision
6	2	Black Isle Studios
6	1	Ion Storm
5	2	Namco
5	1	BioWare
5	1	Neversoft
5	1	Ubisoft
4	2	Hasbro Interactive
4	2	Rare
4	1	Access Software
4	1	FASA Interactive
4	1	Fox Interactive
4	1	Insomniac Games
4	1	Monolith Productions
4	1	Overworks
4	1	Shiny Entertainment
4	1	Westwood Pacific
3	1	AKI Corporation
3	1	Blizzard Entertainment
3	1	Blizzard North
3	1	Disney Interactive
3	1	Ensemble Studios
3	1	LucasArts
3	1	MicroProse
3	1	THQ
3	1	Turbine
3	1	Verant Interactive
2	2	Empire Interactive
2	2	Midway Games
2	2	Sierra On-Line
2	1	DreamWorks Interactive
2	1	Origin Systems
2	1	Rainbow Studios
2	1	Team Ninja
2	1	Tecmo
2	1	United Game Artists
2	1	Zipper Interactive

==== Multiple awards ====
Games that received multiple awards
Awards	Game
5	SSX
3	Diablo II
3	Final Fantasy IX
2	Deus Ex
2	MechWarrior 4: Vengeance
2	Medal of Honor: Underground
2	The Legend of Zelda: Majora's Mask

Awards by company
Awards	Games	Company
11	4	Electronic Arts
4	3	Microsoft
3	2	Nintendo
3	1	Blizzard Entertainment
3	1	Blizzard North
3	1	SquareSoft
2	1	DreamWorks Interactive
2	1	Eidos Interactive
2	1	FASA Interactive
2	1	Ion Storm
