= EverQuest: The Ruins of Kunark =

2000 video game

- Developer: Sony Online Entertainment (Verant Interactive)
- Publisher: Sony Online Entertainment (Verant Interactive)
- Platform: PC
- Release: NA: April 14, 2000; EU: April 28, 2000
- Genre: Massively multiplayer online role-playing
- Mode: Online

EverQuest: The Ruins of Kunark (RoK, Kunark, or simply the Kunark expansion) is the first expansion to EverQuest, a massively multiplayer online role-playing game (MMORPG), released on April 14, 2000. It introduced a new land area to the game, the continent of Kunark, which had been previously unexplored. Through a mix of in-game events and fiction published on the web by Verant Interactive, the storyline of the discovery of Kunark was established.

== General information ==
In terms of the game, The Ruins of Kunark had a different visual feel compared to the original zones in EverQuest: the color palette was more vibrant and many of the models used for the monsters were more detailed. This detail was most evident in the Iksar, a new playable race of lizard people introduced with the expansion. The Iksar had a number of racial advantages, including the ability to stay underwater for longer periods of time, additional regenerative powers, and an armor bonus. This was balanced by the fact that they were hated by all of the other races in the game and that there were very few places they could go without being attacked. They also could not wear plate armor.

The Kunark expansion also increased the maximum level a character could attain from 50 to 60, and introduced a substantial number of new and powerful monsters for characters above level 50 to fight. The most notable of these was Veeshan's Peak, a zone populated by dragons that was, at its release, declared to be the hardest zone that would be put into EverQuest. Another notable and deep dungeon is Sebilis, the lair of the undead dragon Trakanon, which required players to level past the previous limit and obtain improved gear introduced in the expansion.

The Ruins of Kunark was also the focus of 'epic quests', or quests for powerful weapons for each character class, which were introduced between the Kunark and Velious expansions as a source of further high-end content. The Kunark expansion was unique in its method of distribution. A player would order the expansion from Verant's online store, and it was then shipped directly to the player's home. Unforeseen shipping delays caused many players to miss the expansion's official opening date. Thereafter, most EverQuest expansions were either available in local stores, or downloaded directly from Verant, many weeks before the official opening date.

== Reception ==
In the United States, The Ruins of Kunark sold 92,172 units between February 2000 through the first week of November alone. Desslock of GameSpot reported that the game and The Scars of Velious "sold well early in the year, but sales evaporated during the course of the summer, especially after the release of Camelot".

The Ruins of Kunark holds a 89% rating on GameRankings.

Richard Baguley for PC World said that "elfin magic, fierce foes, online action" are all here in the game.

Alex Handy for Computer Gaming World said that "it's hard to find problems with EverQuest. It's even harder to find problems with Ruins of Kunark, the expansion for the wildly successful massively multiplayer online role-playing game that has destroyed the lives of thousands".

Adam Duncan for Hyper said that "gamers who loved EQ will love Ruins of Kunark".

Chris Anderson for PC Zone said: "While Kunark doesn't radically change EQ's gameplay, it has enough to justify upgrading, and the extra space afforded on each server due to a partial exodus to Kunark makes it far more appealing".

During the 4th Annual Interactive Achievement Awards, the Academy of Interactive Arts & Sciences honored The Ruins of Kunark with the "Massive Multiplayer/Persistent World" award, and received nominations for "PC Game of the Year" and "Game of the Year".

== Reviews ==
- PC Player (German magazine)
- Giochi per il mio computer (Italian)

== See also ==
- EverQuest II: Rise of Kunark
