= Motocross Madness 2 =

2000 video game

- Developer: Rainbow Studios
- Publisher: Microsoft Games
- Designers: Robb Rinard; Stephane Roncada
- Programmers: Mark DeSimone; Glenn O'Bannon
- Artists: Brian Gillies; Kiki Wolfkill
- Platform: Microsoft Windows
- Release: NA: May 25, 2000; UK: July 21, 2000
- Genres: Vehicle simulation, racing
- Modes: Single-player, multiplayer

Motocross Madness 2 is a motocross racing video game that was developed by Rainbow Studios and published by Microsoft Games.

This sequel to 1998's Motocross Madness was released in May 2000 with improved graphics, which included better textures and many landscape objects like trees, road signs and caravans. It has over 40 tracks in 6 event types, over 50,000 3D objects and a new career mode. Players as well as bikes are easily customized. Motocross Madness also supports network play over a LAN environment and, until June 19, 2006, multiplayer gameplay through the MSN Gaming Network.

== Gameplay ==
In MCM2, there are six types of racing: Stunts, Enduro, Baja, Supercross and Nationals, and the campaign-style Pro-Circuit Mode.

In Pro-Circuit mode, a single player follows a series of events and courses in an effort to win prize money and upgrade equipment. Unlike the single-player mode, the multiplayer mode is completely lacking in structure. Players can race against each other on the same map, play tag and can choose from Supercross or Enduro. In either mode, players are not limited to track space, and are free to play amongst the terrain and inanimate objects or moving features such as trains, cars and farm tractors.

In Baja mode, the player races against other opponents to ride through checkpoints (called "gates") until all of the gates have been ridden through - this is one complete lap. The first player to complete a certain number of laps is the winner. Baja, unlike Nationals or Enduro, takes place in massive, open wilderness.

In Enduro mode, which is similar to baja, the player also races against other opponents to ride through gates, with the goal of being the first to complete a certain number of laps. Except, in this mode, the races take place in urban or rural maps, which is smaller and more variable than Baja.

In Nationals mode, the player is restricted to racing within a dirtbiking track against other opponents, with the goal of completing a certain number of laps first (there are no gates in this mode).

In Stunts mode, the player, in order to win, must accumulate the highest number of points by performing successful stunts. To perform a stunt, a rider must gain enough height in mid-air and then is able to perform any of the six stunts. A failed stunt results from the rider crashing while attempting to perform a stunt. In stunts, there is no restriction as to where the player may go, and so he may also roam freely across the map.

In Supercross mode, the player must race against other opponents within a dirtbiking track in a large stadium watched by an audience. It features an extreme sports-like atmosphere, with the crowd reacting to the player's performance. Supercross is similar to nationals, except for the location as well as nationals tracks are far broader and thinner, whereas Supercross tracks are large yet the track is compact.

While creating a custom game in single-player, players can select the number of computer opponents to compete against, which range from 0, the minimum, to 10 - the maximum number of opponents in a game (this makes a full race in MM2 eleven players maximum). They may also select the difficulty, which ranges from easy and normal to hard. They may then also select the map/track, game mode and toggle vegetation collision (whether players can crash into solid objects, such as trees or buildings) and whether they want to record a replay of the game they are about to play. Players can also select which bike they want to compete with as well as the appearance of the suit of their rider. Players can also select the style of the game they want to play: practice, single event, ghost or tournament. Practice games never end and no players can win. Single events finish right after all players complete the track. Ghost races allow players to race against their own times (how long it took them to finish the track). Tournaments are composed of various single events.

== Customization ==
Unlike its predecessor, Motocross Madness 2 allows players to create terrains (referred to as 'maps' or 'tracks') using Adobe Photoshop and the Armadillo terrain editor. These maps can be utilized by players who download them to their PCs. Players can create their own clothing and customize their motorcycles. Microsoft added to the realism of the game by securing licensed motorcycles from Yamaha, KTM, Suzuki, and Honda.

== Music ==
"New Skin", by the band Incubus, appeared in the opening segment of Motocross Madness 2. It was originally taken from their 1997 album S.C.I.E.N.C.E.. The end credits featured the song "Deville" from the band Strung Out. Most of the in-game sounds, such as the bikers crying out in pain when falling or radios playing in nearby caravans, were recorded from real-life sources. Music was not played during the in-game races.

== Reception ==
Reception

Aggregate score
Aggregator	Score
GameRankings	86%

Review scores
Publication	Score
AllGame	4/5
CNET Gamecenter	7/10
Computer Games Strategy Plus	4.5/5
Computer Gaming World	4.5/5
Eurogamer	8/10
GamePro	5/5
GameRevolution	A−
GameSpot	8.8/10
GameSpy	89%
GameZone	8.9/10
IGN	8.6/10
Next Generation	4/5
PC Gamer (US)	87%

Award
Publication	Award
PC Gamer	2000 Editor's Choice Award

Motocross Madness 2 received favorable reviews according to the review aggregation website GameRankings.

Vincent Lopez of IGN said of the game: "it's about fun, and MM2 provides this in piles and piles. The crash animations never (and I mean never) stop being anything less than hilarious, and the action is always as a pretty relentless pace. The eye-candy is constantly impressive, the physics are crazy enough to be fun but real enough to look right, and the multiplayer game is a blast, especially if you've got devious friends." Stephen Poole of GameSpot said that the game "isn't the most realistic motorcycle simulation you can buy, but it's definitely one of the most enjoyable." Jim Preston of NextGen said of the game: "Flying spread-eagle into a cactus never looked so good."

The staff of Computer Gaming World named it the best racing game of 2000. They hailed it as "far and away the most viscerally pleasing and outright fun racing game we've played in a long time." The game also won the Editor's Choice Award from PC Gamer, which called it "The PC's pre-eminent bike sim." The staff of Computer Games Magazine nominated it for their 2000 "Racing Game of the Year" award, whose winner remains unknown. During the Academy of Interactive Arts & Sciences' 4th Annual Interactive Achievement Awards, Motocross Madness 2 won the "PC Sports" award, which it shared with FIFA 2001, and was a nominee for the "Visual Engineering" award, which ultimately went to SSX.
