= Virtua Tennis (video game) =

1999 sports video game

- Arcade flyer
- Developer: Sega AM3
- Publishers: Sega: NA: Activision Value (PC); EU: Empire Interactive (PC); NA: THQ (GBA)
- Director: Katsumoto Tatsukawa
- Producer: Mie Kumagai
- Designer: Kazuko Noguchi
- Programmer: Mitsuharu Saikawa
- Composer: Chiho Kobayashi
- Series: Virtua Tennis
- Platforms: Arcade, Dreamcast, Microsoft Windows, Game Boy Advance, N-Gage
- Release: December 1999: Arcade; JP: December 1999; WW: 1999 Dreamcast; NA: July 11, 2000; EU: September 8, 2000; JP: November 23, 2000 Windows; EU: March 15, 2002; JP: July 11, 2002; NA: September 25, 2002 Game Boy Advance; NA: October 7, 2002; EU: March 7, 2003 N-Gage; EU: December 5, 2003; NA: December 8, 2003
- Genre: Sports game
- Modes: Single player, multiplayer
- Arcade system: Sega NAOMI

Virtua Tennis, known in Japan as Power Smash (パワースマッシュ, Pawā Sumasshu), is a 1999 tennis video game developed by Sega AM3 and published by Sega. Originally released for arcades on the Sega NAOMI hardware, it was ported to the Dreamcast in 2000 and later to Microsoft Windows, Game Boy Advance and N-Gage. The home versions expanded the arcade game with a World Circuit career mode in which players compete in matches and complete training minigames to improve their ranking.

The Dreamcast version received widespread critical acclaim and was nominated for Console Sports Game of the Year, Console Game of the Year and overall Game of the Year at the 4th Annual Interactive Achievement Awards. The game was followed by Virtua Tennis 2 in 2001 and became the first entry in the Virtua Tennis series.

== Game modes ==
=== Arcade ===
In Arcade mode, players compete in five successive matches of increasing difficulty, choosing between singles and doubles. The mode supports up to four players, with additional players able to join during gameplay.

=== Exhibition ===
Exhibition mode allows players to customise individual matches, including the court, opponent difficulty and match rules. Matches can be played in singles or doubles, with up to four human players participating. The number of games required to win can be adjusted from a single game to a full set.

=== World Circuit ===
World Circuit is a single-player career mode in which players compete in international tournaments and complete training minigames to improve their ranking and unlock additional challenges. The training exercises include knocking down bowling pins, hitting targets and clearing boxes from the court. Players earn prize money that can be spent on additional characters, courts, clothing and doubles partners, with purchased content also available in other game modes.

=== Game Content ===
The game features eight licensed professional tennis players: Jim Courier, Cédric Pioline, Tim Henman, Tommy Haas, Mark Philippoussis, Carlos Moyá, Thomas Johansson and Yevgeny Kafelnikov. Players compete at venues inspired by the four Grand Slam tournaments, alongside a fictional Sega tournament. The Dreamcast version also includes additional fictional players who can be unlocked through World Circuit mode and subsequently used in Arcade and Exhibition matches.

== Development ==
Virtua Tennis was developed by Sega AM3. The producer, Mie Kumagai, wanted to create a game that appealed to broad demographics of players, taking note of the large number of one-on-one fighting games that proliferated throughout Japanese arcades during the 1990s. She also wished to replicate the critical and commercial achievements of Sega AM2's soccer title Virtua Striker, which was directed by Satoshi Mifune and was a hit among a wide range of age groups. Kumagai began planning a game that could serve as a both a fun, casual experience and competitive, hardcore experience for people to play with friends and family in arcades and at home. Her initial proposal, a basketball game was rejected, while her alternative proposal, a tennis game, was accepted. However, the potential for the project's success was still met with a large amount of skepticism within Sega. After Kumagai acquired a programmer, they made a trip to a tennis school for research, and began designing a unique paddle controller. By twisting this paddle, the user could switch between forehand and backhand shots, but after months of in-house experimentation it proved too difficult to operate. Taking advice from Mifune, the team simplified the controls to a more traditional joystick and buttons. User reception at location testing and in Sega's offices proved to be very positive and development thereafter was smooth. Sega executives feared the game's original Japanese title, Power Smash, would not translate well to overseas audiences. For its North American and European localizations, the name adopted the familiar Virtua label and was changed to Virtua Tennis.

According to producer Mie Kumagai, the Dreamcast conversion of Virtua Tennis took seven months to develop. The selectable roster expanded from eight licensed professional tennis players to sixteen characters through the addition of eight fictional players, who could be unlocked through the World Circuit mode. Kumagai explained that Sega had considered including internationally prominent players such as Andre Agassi, but rejected this approach partly because the licensing costs could exceed the game's development budget. The team also wanted to represent a wider variety of countries rather than focus on individual celebrities. To assist with character animation, several Japanese tennis players were brought into Sega's studio to provide references for the players' movements. Kumagai additionally explained that Sega prioritised releasing the Dreamcast version in North America and Europe, where tennis had a larger audience than in Japan.

The Japanese Dreamcast release, titled Power Smash, also featured online multiplayer, a feature absent from the North American and European versions. Japanese magazine Dreamcast Magazine previewed the network functionality in August 2000, reporting that players would be able to compete against opponents throughout Japan.

Sega promoted the Japanese Dreamcast release through competitive gaming events. On 23 November 2000, the game's Japanese launch date, tournaments were scheduled at six venues across Japan. Prizes included a trip for two to attend the Australian Open and ten Dreamcast games. An exhibition match featuring television personality Fumie Nakajima was also scheduled for the Tokyo event, while the game's spectator mode allowed users to watch the tournament remotely.

Sega subsequently organised online competitions, including the second ISAO Open in January 2001 and Australia Challenge 2001, which ran from 22 to 28 January.

In Europe, Sega released the game on 8 September 2000, the same day that the company reduced the recommended retail price of the Dreamcast to £149.99. Sega Europe included the game among the major software releases intended to support the console's second year on the market. Sega UK head of marketing Alison Turner promoted the game's accessibility, multiple play modes, realistic courts and World Circuit features. Despite this, The Guardian described the marketing as invisible.

== Reception ==
Reception

Aggregate score
Aggregator	Score			
Aggregator	Dreamcast	GBA	N-Gage	PC
Metacritic	92/100	83/100	43/100	67/100

Review scores
Publication	Score			
Publication	Dreamcast	GBA	N-Gage	PC
CNET Gamecenter	9/10	N/A	N/A	N/A
Computer Gaming World	N/A	N/A	N/A	2/5
Electronic Gaming Monthly	8.33/10 (Note: Three critics of Electronic Gaming Monthly gave the Dreamcast version each a score of 7.5/10, 8/10, and 9.5/10.)	N/A	5/10	N/A
Eurogamer	9/10	8/10	2/10	N/A
Famitsu	33/40	N/A	N/A	N/A
Game Informer	9.25/10	7.75/10	5/10	N/A
GameFan	94% (Note: In GameFan's viewpoint of the Dreamcast version, one critic gave it 95, and the other 93.)	N/A	N/A	N/A
GameRevolution	B+	N/A	N/A	N/A
GameSpot	8.1/10	8.7/10	3.3/10	N/A
GameSpy	(SP) 89% (PDC) 8.5/10	4/5	2/5	N/A
IGN	9.4/10	9/10	3.5/10	N/A
Next Generation	5/5	N/A	N/A	N/A
Nintendo Power	N/A	3.6/5	N/A	N/A
PC Gamer (US)	N/A	N/A	N/A	84%

The Dreamcast version received "universal acclaim", the Game Boy Advance version received "favorable" reviews, and the PC version received "average" reviews, while the N-Gage version received "generally unfavorable reviews", according to the review aggregation website Metacritic. Blake Fischer of NextGen called the Dreamcast version "The best four-player game in a long time, and an excellent single- and two-player diversion. Don't avoid this because it's not football – you'll get more playtime out of it than you think." In Japan, Famitsu gave the same console version a score of 33 out of 40.

John Thompson of AllGame gave the same arcade version four-and-a-half stars out of five, saying: "With an excellent engine, beautiful graphics and sounds, and an intuitive, deep gameplay system, Virtua Tennis is one of the best arcade games in recent memory. Sega dominated arcades of the late '90s, and with excellent titles such as this, it's easy to see why." Bryan Melville, however, gave the Dreamcast version four stars, calling it "a game that will go down as one of the best arcade ports on the 128-bit system." Edge gave the same Dreamcast version eight out of ten, saying: "Were it not for the irritation caused by the almost unbeatable players in later stages and the inability to play more than a single set per match, Virtua Tennis would have been a near-perfect sports game." The D-Pad Destroyer of GamePro called the same console version "one of the most purely fun sports games in a long time, up there with Sega Bass Fishing in the Games You're Embarrassed To Enjoy category. If you're a sports fan, go get it." (Note: GamePro gave the Dreamcast version two 5/5 scores for graphics and fun factor, and two 4.5/5 scores for sound and control.) Four-Eyed Dragon said of the Game Boy Advance version: "Even with sluggish controls and so-so visuals, Virtua Tennis still delivers, especially in the winning career mode where you train your custom-made athletes (both male and female) to become the number-one ranked in the world." (Note: GamePro gave the Game Boy Advance version two 3.5/5 scores for graphics and fun factor, and two 3/5 scores for sound and control.)

European reviews for the Dreamcast version were highly positive. British magazine Computer and Video Games awarded Virtua Tennis five stars out of five, praising its accessibility, visual presentation and multiplayer play, and arguing that it could appeal even to players with little interest in tennis. French magazine Joypad gave the game 9 out of 10, praising its combination of simple controls with greater tactical depth and describing it as an exceptional tennis game.

German magazine MAN!AC awarded the game 87%, praising its player animations, accessible but nuanced controls, World Circuit mode and multiplayer options. Spanish magazine Dreamplanet similarly praised the Dreamcast conversion for retaining the quality of the arcade original while adding substantial new content, particularly the minigames included in the World Circuit mode.

The Dreamcast version has been ranked in the top 100 games of all time by IGN both in 2005 (#91) and 2003 (#89). Game Informer placed the Dreamcast version 50th on their top 100 video games of all time in 2001. It was also featured in Guinness World Records 2017: Gamer's Edition where it says that the Dreamcast version got GameRankings score of 91.37% based on 33 reviews.

The Dreamcast version was a runner-up for the "Best Multiplayer Game" and "Best Sports Game (Traditional)" awards at GameSpot's Best and Worst of 2000 Awards, both of which went to Quake III Arena and NFL 2K1, respectively. During the 4th Annual Interactive Achievement Awards, the Academy of Interactive Arts & Sciences nominated the Dreamcast version for the "Console Sports", "Console Game of the Year" and "Game of the Year" awards; the first two went to SSX, while the latter went to Diablo II. Two years later, the Game Boy Advance version was also a runner-up for the website's "Best Sports Game on Game Boy Advance" award, which went to Tony Hawk's Pro Skater 3. The PC version was a runner-up for PC Gamer US' "2002 Best Sports Game" award, which ultimately went to Tiger Woods PGA Tour 2003. Greg Howson of The Guardian awarded the Dreamcast version four stars out of five and described it as the "outstanding sports game of the year".

== Commercial performance ==
In Japan, Game Machine ranked the arcade version of Virtua Tennis, known locally as Power Smash, third in its video game software chart published on 1 February 2000. In October 2000, Italian publication KULT Underground described the arcade version of Virtua Tennis as having achieved considerable success in amusement arcades, attributing its popularity to the game's accessible and engaging gameplay.

In the United Kingdom, the Dreamcast version debuted at number one on the combined-formats software chart for the week ending September 9, 2000.

In Germany, the Dreamcast version debuted at number one on Media Control's Dreamcast sales chart in September 2000. In Spain, Virtua Tennis topped the Revista Oficial Dreamcast sales chart in November 2000, based on data provided by retailer Centro Mail.

In 2025, GameSpot, using lifetime United States retail tracking data supplied by Circana, ranked Virtua Tennis as the twelfth-best-selling Dreamcast game by unit sales and twentieth by dollar sales. According to NPD sales figures reproduced by Blast Processing!, the Dreamcast version sold 368,035 copies in North America by 2003. In Japan, it sold an estimated 50,824 copies according to a compilation of Famitsu sales data.

== Legacy and influence ==
Italian publication Everyeye retrospectively described Virtua Tennis as a "killer application" for the Dreamcast, noting the game's considerable commercial success. Virtua Tennis was credited with helping popularize tennis video games. In a 2003 review of Top Spin, GameSpot stated that Sega had "brought tennis to the video gaming masses" with Virtua Tennis, noting that numerous imitators subsequently appeared but had failed to match its quality until the release of Top Spin. Virtua Tennis also directly influenced the development of Top Spin (2003). Microsoft program manager Matthew Seymour said that the developers used Virtua Tennis and Mario Tennis as inspirations, describing them as games which had "set the bar" for the genre. Seymour specifically cited Virtua Tennis's ease of play and fast-paced rallies as influential, while the Top Spin team sought to retain its accessibility while adding greater tactical depth and realism.

The game was also cited as a personal favorite by professional basketball player Chris Paul, who told IGN in 2005 that after growing up playing sports games including Madden NFL, NBA Jam and NFL 2K on the Dreamcast, "The game I really loved was Virtua Tennis."

In January 2026, online multiplayer functionality for the Japanese Dreamcast version was restored by the Dreamcast preservation community, allowing players to compete online again through replacement servers.
