= FIFA 2001 =

2000 video game

- British and Irish PlayStation cover art featuring Manchester United's Paul Scholes
- Developer: EA Canada
- Publisher: EA Sports
- Series: FIFA
- Platforms: Windows, PlayStation, PlayStation 2
- Release: Windows, PlayStation: NA: 31 October 2000; EU: 3 November 2000 (PS); EU: 10 November 2000; PlayStation 2: EU: 24 November 2000; NA: 28 November 2000
- Genre: Sports
- Modes: Single-player, multiplayer

FIFA 2001 (known as FIFA 2001: Major League Soccer in North America and FIFA 2001: World Championship in Japan) is a football simulation video game and the sequel to FIFA 2000. It was succeeded by FIFA Football 2002. It features Paul Scholes on the UK cover and Ben Olsen on the North American cover. The game's Spanish cover features Gaizka Mendieta on it. It was released on 31 October 2000 for Microsoft Windows and PlayStation, and on 24 November 2000 for PlayStation 2 as a launch title in Europe. The PlayStation 2 version was originally slated for release in the U.S. on 7 November, before it was delayed to 28 November. A Game Boy Color version was planned but cancelled.

== Reception ==
Reception

Aggregate score
Aggregator	Score		
Aggregator	PC	PS	PS2
Metacritic	85/100	85/100	83/100

Review scores
Publication	Score		
Publication	PC	PS	PS2
AllGame	3/5	N/A	3/5
CNET Gamecenter	9/10	8/10	N/A
Computer Games Strategy Plus	4/5	N/A	N/A
Computer Gaming World	5/5	N/A	N/A
Electronic Gaming Monthly	N/A	7.5/10	8.83/10 (Note: Three critics of Electronic Gaming Monthly gave the PlayStation 2 version each a score of 9/10, 8/10, and 9.5/10.)
Eurogamer	8/10	7/10	N/A
Famitsu	N/A	N/A	30/40
Game Informer	N/A	7.5/10	8/10
GameSpot	9/10	8.3/10	9/10
GameSpy	N/A	N/A	91%
GameZone	9/10	8.5/10	N/A
IGN	8.8/10	9.2/10	9/10
Official U.S. PlayStation Magazine	N/A	4.5/5	4.5/5
PC Gamer (US)	80%	N/A	N/A
Playboy	N/A	N/A	90%

The game received "favourable" reviews on all platforms according to the review aggregation website Metacritic. CNET Gamecenter gave the PC version a favourable review, a week-and-a-half before its U.S. release date. In Japan, where the PlayStation 2 version was ported and published by Electronic Arts Square under the name FIFA 2001: World Championship (FIFA2001 ワールドチャンピオンシップ, FIFA 2001 Wārudo Chanpionshippu) on 7 December 2000, Famitsu gave it a score of 30 out of 40.

Dr. Zombie of GamePro said of the PlayStation version, "Even though FIFA 2001 is also slated for the PlayStation 2, PlayStation owners won't miss out-the gameplay and features should remain the same, as does the high Fun Factor. Once again, EA Sports scores with FIFA 2001!" (Note: GamePro gave the PlayStation version all perfect fives each for graphics, sound, control, and fun factor.) Air Hendrix said that the PlayStation 2 version "delivers a fine performance. It's not the instant classic that some of EA's other titles are, but if you're a fan of the world's most popular sport, you'll be glued to the controller." (Note: GamePro gave the PlayStation 2 version three 4.5/5 scores for graphics, control, and fun factor, and 4/5 for sound.) Extended Play gave the same PS2 version four stars out of five, saying, "'FIFA 2001 Major League Soccer' for the PS2 is deep, fast, and instantly playable. It is by far the most realistic and best-looking soccer game ever -- and, to top it off, the most fun. This is something we've grown accustomed to with EA Sports. The PlayStation2 [sic] is perfect for capturing the massive scope of this worldwide sport."

The PC version was a finalist for the "Sports" award at Computer Gaming World's 2001 Premier Awards, which went to Sammy Sosa High Heat Baseball 2001. The same PC version was nominated for the Sports Game of the Year award at the CNET Gamecenter Computer Game Awards for 2000, which went to NHL 2001. Said PC version won the award for "Sports Game of the Year" at GameSpot's Best and Worst of 2000 Awards. The PlayStation 2 version was also nominated for the "Best Sports Game (Traditional)" award, which went to NFL 2K1. During the Academy of Interactive Arts & Sciences' 4th Annual Interactive Achievement Awards, the PC version won the "PC Sports" award, which it shared with Motocross Madness 2, and was a finalist for "PC Game of the Year" and "Game of the Year", which ultimately lost both to Diablo II; it was also a nominee for "Visual Engineering", which ultimately went to SSX.

The PlayStation version received a "Gold" sales award from the Entertainment and Leisure Software Publishers Association (ELSPA), indicating sales of at least 200,000 units in the UK.
