= Sacrifice (video game) =

2000 real-time strategy video game

- Developer: Shiny Entertainment
- Publishers: Interplay Entertainment; MacPlay (Mac)
- Producer: Mark Teal
- Designer: Eric Flannum
- Programmer: Martin Brownlow
- Artist: Joby-Rome Otero
- Writer: James Phinney
- Composer: Kevin Manthei
- Platforms: Windows, Mac OS
- Release: Windows: NA: November 17, 2000; EU: November 24, 2000; Mac OS: December 14, 2001
- Genre: Real-time strategy
- Modes: Single-player, multiplayer

Sacrifice is a real-time strategy video game published by Interplay Entertainment in 2000 for Microsoft Windows platform. Developed by Shiny Entertainment, the game features elements of action and other genres. Players control wizards who fight each other with spells and summoned creatures. The game was ported to Mac OS 9.2 in 2001.

Unlike many of its contemporary real-time strategy games, Sacrifice places little emphasis on resource gathering and management. There is no system of workers; the players' wizards collect souls to summon creatures, and their mana—energy for casting spells—constantly regenerates. Players customize their attacks by choosing from spells and creatures aligned to five gods. To defeat an opponent, the player's wizard sacrifices a friendly unit at the opposing wizard's altar, thereby desecrating it and banishing the enemy wizard. Aside from a single-player campaign, Sacrifice offers a multiplayer mode, in which up to four players can play against each other over computer networks.

Sacrifice was created by a small team of developers; most of the work was done by four key personnel. The graphic engine of the game uses tesselation: thousands of polygons are used to display an object and as lesser details are needed, the number of polygons is reduced. By adjusting the required level of detail, Sacrifice can be run on various machines with the highest possible quality of graphics. Complementing the graphics of the game were the voice work of professional actors, such as Tim Curry, and the musical compositions of Kevin Manthei. Sacrifice was praised by reviewers for the novel designs of its creatures and for its humorous content. The high level of attention needed to manage its frenetic combat was mentioned as a flaw. Despite winning several awards, Sacrifice was not a commercial success.

== Gameplay ==
In Sacrifice, players control wizards, looking over their characters from behind. Each match starts the player with a wizard and an altar. Using the keyboard and mouse, players move their wizards around a virtual world, directing armies and casting spells to eliminate their opponents. A player's wizard defeats an opponent by desecrating their altar through the magical "sacrifice" of a friendly unit.

In Sacrifice, players control their character from a third-person perspective. Pop-up menus show the formations the characters' army can assume.

Wizards can cast spells that harm opponents (combat spells), heal damage taken, or summon creatures. More advanced combat spells affect large areas of the battlefield, taking the form of tornadoes and volcanoes. Casting spells requires energy, which the game represents in the form of mana. Recovery of mana is slow, but a wizard accelerates the process by staying close to their altar. Close proximity to one of several fountains of mana scattered across the world increases their recovery rate as well. A wizard can monopolize a mana fountain by erecting a structure known as a manalith over it. Because mana can always be regained, it is an infinite resource. Souls are the other type of resource in this game; they are used, along with mana, to summon creatures, who form the mainstay of the players' offensive capability. Unlike mana, souls are limited in quantity. Players start with a few souls and increase their resources by locating unclaimed souls, or by converting the souls of unfriendly creatures their wizards have killed.

One the player's priest is carrying a dead enemy's soul to the player altar for cleansing. A mana fountain can be seen on the right side.

Summoned creatures are mainly classified into three classes: melee, ranged, and air (flyers). In a rock-paper-scissors manner, each class is a counter to another. Melee creatures inflict more damage to their ranged opponents, but cannot retaliate against flyers, which in turn are vulnerable to those who can attack at range. Several creatures also have special abilities, such as creating protective magical barriers, becoming invisible, or immobilizing their opponents. Two units, manahoars and sac doctors, have special purposes. Manahoars help to recharge their summoner's mana by channeling energy from manaliths to him or her. Sac doctors are summoned to extract the souls of fallen opponents and bring them back to the altar for conversion. These units are also summoned to hold the sacrificial rituals required for desecrating enemy altars; killing a sac doctor disrupts the process.

The spells and abilities of the creatures are designed along the ethos of five gods. Persephone, the Great Healer, bestows her followers with powers of regeneration and nature. Her counterpart, Charnel, God of Strife, celebrates death and decay; his creatures are undead and his spells drains the life of others. The other three gods—James, Stratos, and Pyro—govern natural elements, granting their followers abilities associated with earth, air, and fire, respectively.

Unlike other real-time strategy games released in or before 2000, Sacrifice's gameplay is not focused on large-scale management of resources and bases. Instead, the game emphasizes micromanagement of the players' units; success in the game is linked to meticulous control of individuals or small groups to overcome enemies. Players order their armies to assume formations by pressing an assigned key or navigating through a pop-up menu. The order can also be given by moving the mouse in specific patterns without waiting for the menu to appear.

=== Single-player campaign ===
Sacrifice's single-player campaign begins with a meeting between the protagonist Eldred and the blind seer Mithras on a war-torn world. Through voiceovers and cut scenes rendered by the game engine, Eldred recounts to Mithras his background and the events that led to the world's current state. Eldred was a tyrannical emperor who ruled over the world of Jhera. However, his days of rule were numbered: his subjects were rebelling, and his enemies gathered at the borders of his realm. Turning to the mystical arts for a solution, Eldred summoned a demon, Marduk, to eliminate opposition to his rule. Marduk proved uncontrollable and ravaged Jhera. Eldred fled to the world that he and Mithras stand on. The world—having suffered a past cataclysm—was riven into a collection of five floating islands. A god rules over each realm, seeking to impose their own agenda. The rivalries among the gods are aggravated by Mithras's prophecy of a traitor amongst them. Sensing the opportunity for a new lease on life, Eldred offers his service to the gods.

The campaign spans ten missions. In each mission, the player chooses a god for Eldred to champion, receiving creatures and spells from that god. The player can build up a selection of units and spells from different gods by changing Eldred's allegiance between missions; the selections are used in later missions or multiplayer sessions. As the game progresses, the player's choices align Eldred with one god. Aside from the stated goals in each mission, there are secret objectives that if accomplished bestow bonuses to Eldred's attributes (magical and physical resistance, more mana, etc.).

Midway through the campaign, Eldred encounters Marduk again. The demon taunts the wizard and announces that this world will suffer the same fate as Jhera. Eldred warns the gods; they believe one of them supports the demon and fall upon each other to eliminate the traitor. By the last stage of the campaign, Eldred has helped one god to kill the others. After the end of the wizard's narration, Mithras reveals himself as Marduk. Stratos, the traitor, had planned for the demon to appear on this world and deliver the prophecy to the gods. Marduk berates Eldred for his naivety and starts the final battle. After defeating the demon, the player chooses one of two endings for Eldred: stay and help the last god rule the world, or leave and seek his destiny in other worlds.

=== Multiplayer ===
Sacrifice features the capability for players to play matches against each other over computer networks; up to four players (human- or computer-controlled) can participate in a multiplayer match. Four modes of play are available: Skirmish, Slaughter, Soul Harvest, and Domination. Skirmish's gameplay is similar to that of the single-player mode; a player wins the match by banishing the others' wizards. The winner of Domination is the wizard who controls a certain number of manaliths. The goal in Slaughter is to amass the most kills, while wizards in Soul Harvest have to collect the most souls.

Initially, the multiplayer games could only be played over small-area networks of computers (local area networks), or over the internet through an integrated matchmaking service. Later software patches added online rankings and the capability to connect computers via Internet Protocol Suite (TCP/IP), allowing play over the internet without the matchmaking service. The Macintosh version's matchmaking, handled by GameRanger, had to be installed through a patch. Multiplayer matches cannot be played between different computer platforms.

== Development ==
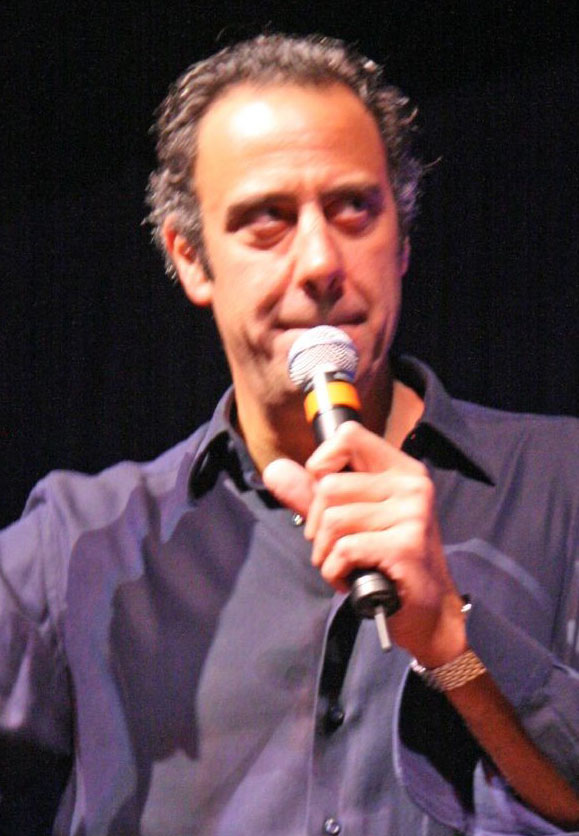
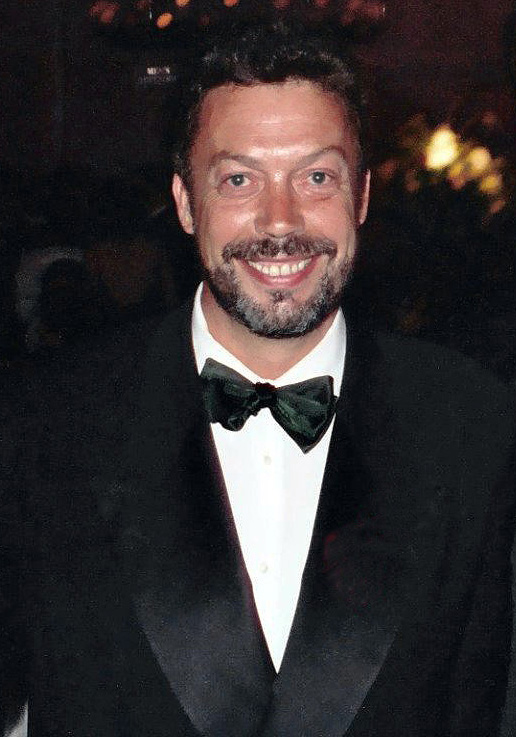
Brad Garrett (left) and Tim Curry (right) voiced two of the gods, James and Stratos respectively, in the game. Their efforts were praised by several reviewers for bringing depth to the characters.

Sacrifice's development started in August 1997. The game's lead programmer, Martin Brownlow, was inspired by Chaos: The Battle of Wizards, which was released in 1985 for the ZX Spectrum computer. In the old game, players take turns to control wizards, summoning creatures and casting spells to eliminate each other. Shiny desired to avoid repeating the bad experience of marketing their last product Messiah. Released in March 2000, the game was extravagantly promoted by Shiny during its development, and the resulting heavy scrutiny from the media greatly stressed the team who worked on the game. FiringSquad claimed that until the year of its release, no one outside the company knew of the game. However, Electronic Gaming Monthly printed a number of details about the game in an issue cover dated December 1997, and Eurogamer reported that Sacrifice "has been hyped almost incessantly in the press, and if you placed every screenshot of the game which has been posted on the web end to end, they would easily reach to the moon and back." According to Brownlow, his team was able to concentrate on developing the game without the media or "fan base questioning every decision that gets made along the way".

The bulk of the work was done by a small team. Game designer Eric Flannum, formerly of Blizzard Entertainment, recalls that there were only three other key personnel: two programmers and an animator. As more game features were developed, the team expanded. Flannum was tasked to lead four level designers, and Jon Gwyn joined Joby Otero on the art team. After the basic features of the game had been completed, James Phinney, lead designer and producer of Blizzard's 1998 real-time strategy game StarCraft, was hired to write the plot for the single-player campaign. His first draft was used as the script for recording placeholder voiceovers, which helped the team to judge the atmosphere in the game. Later, Shiny employed professional actors, such as Tim Curry and Brad Garrett, and various voice artists, such as Jennifer Hale, to record the final voices for the game's characters. Audio filters altered the voices for the gods, giving them a supernatural edge appropriate to their roles. The game had three voice directors: Ginny McSwain, Art Currim and Chris Borders with Margaret Tang providing VO coordination. For background music, Shiny hired Kevin Manthei, who had composed many scores for video games and big- and small-screen entertainment, such as Scream 3 and Buffy the Vampire Slayer. His compositions for Sacrifice were played by an orchestra of 25 instruments. Shiny's founder, David Perry, was so busy with the game's development that he passed over the opportunity to create a video game for the science-fiction movie The Matrix.

=== Graphics ===
Sacrifice's graphics engine was developed from Messiah's. The older game renders its characters by tesselation, using thousands of polygons to make up character models and decreasing the number of polygons when lesser details are required, such as drawing the object at a distance. A typical object in Sacrifice comprises 200 to 2,500 polygons. Shiny expanded the technology's application to the game's virtual world. The environment is not decorated with grass, flowers, and rocks by overlaying two-dimensional images of such objects on the terrain model. Instead, many tiny models of these terrain features litter the landscape. Objects in the game are composed of isosceles right triangles, each of which is infinitely divisible into two smaller isosceles right triangles. The array of infinite triangles derived from these divisions is stored in a binary triangle tree data structure, and the simplicity of the division and its data management algorithms frees up the graphic processor for other duties, allowing more resources to be spent on managing the level of detail. Sacrifice's spell effects are composed of parametric surfaces, which also can be broken down into triangles, facilitating tessellation.

Reviewers considered Sacrifice's creature designs unique.

In early 2000, the computer industry released the first video graphics cards capable of processing transform, clipping, and lighting (T&L) instructions. With the appropriate software, these new cards took over the burden of T&L processing from the computer's processor, allowing more detailed graphics and smoother animation. Shiny capitalized on the breakthrough, spending a few weeks to rewrite a portion of Sacrifice's software. Brownlow and his team refined and improved the game's graphics, increasing the number of polygons per model and setting the software to scan through scenes a few more times to determine what objects to render and how to display them. Sacrifice was acknowledged as the first game on the market to make full use of the new graphic cards (the GeForce 2 and Radeon series). Because of the adopted technology, animation in the game was smooth, without the jerkiness associated with overstressed graphical engines.

For the character models, Otero and his team eschewed conventional designs inspired by The Lord of the Rings and other fantasies. Otero's ideal was that of "form follows function", by which a creature's capabilities or purposes are readily apparent from its appearance. In his opinion, a creature designed to kill enemies by exploding itself would simply be a "cartoon-ish bomb with feet". Otero's simple designs were expanded and fleshed out in detail by Gwyn, who was also responsible for creating Eldred's model. The artists' incorporation of humor in their work did not escape the video game industry's notice; many pointed out the quirky allusion of James, God of Earth, to Earthworm Jim, star of Shiny's previous games.

=== Release ===
By June, the major features of the game had been implemented, and Shiny proceeded to the next stage of development. It selected a thousand members of the public to participate in a beta test of Sacrifice's multiplayer modes, receiving feedback on software bugs, performance issues, and possible improvements. The game's publisher, Interplay Entertainment, assigned its quality assurance department to test the single-player mode. Perry promoted the game by visiting professional game reviewers, such as FiringSquad, and giving copies of the beta version to them. On November 17, 2000, Interplay released the game for the Windows platform. Shiny packaged a level editor, Scapex, with the finished product, allowing gamers to create their own levels. The tool displays the user's changes as they are added to the level. Users have total control over the positioning of models and scripting of events, although the tool does not provide the capability to create new spells or creatures. User-created maps can be shared with other players during the connection phase of multiplayer games.

Earlier in the same month, Macintosh software publisher MacPlay announced that it was porting Sacrifice to the Apple computers. It took the company several months to adapt the source code to the Macintosh architecture, and on December 14, 2001, the Macintosh version of the game was released. It has almost the same features as the original version; however, Scapex was excluded from the port. Another feature left out was multiplayer mode, which MacPlay added through a software patch.

== Reception ==
Reception

Aggregate score
Aggregator	Score
Metacritic	89/100

Review scores
Publication	Score
CNET Gamecenter	9/10
Computer Games Strategy Plus	5/5
Computer Gaming World	4/5
Edge	7/10
EP Daily	9.5/10
Eurogamer	6/10
Game Informer	8.5/10
GameRevolution	A−
GameSpot	8.6/10
GameSpy	93%
IGN	9.4/10
MacLife	(Mac) "Spiffy"
Next Generation	4/5
PC Gamer (US)	90%

The PC version received "generally favorable reviews" according to the review aggregation website Metacritic. Lamchop of GamePro said, "A third-person hybrid of fantasy role-playing and real-time strategy, Sacrifice weaves together an intricate story, addictive gameplay, and drop-dead gorgeous graphics." (Note: GamePro gave the PC version three 5/5 scores for graphics, sound, and fun factor, and 4.5/5 for control.)

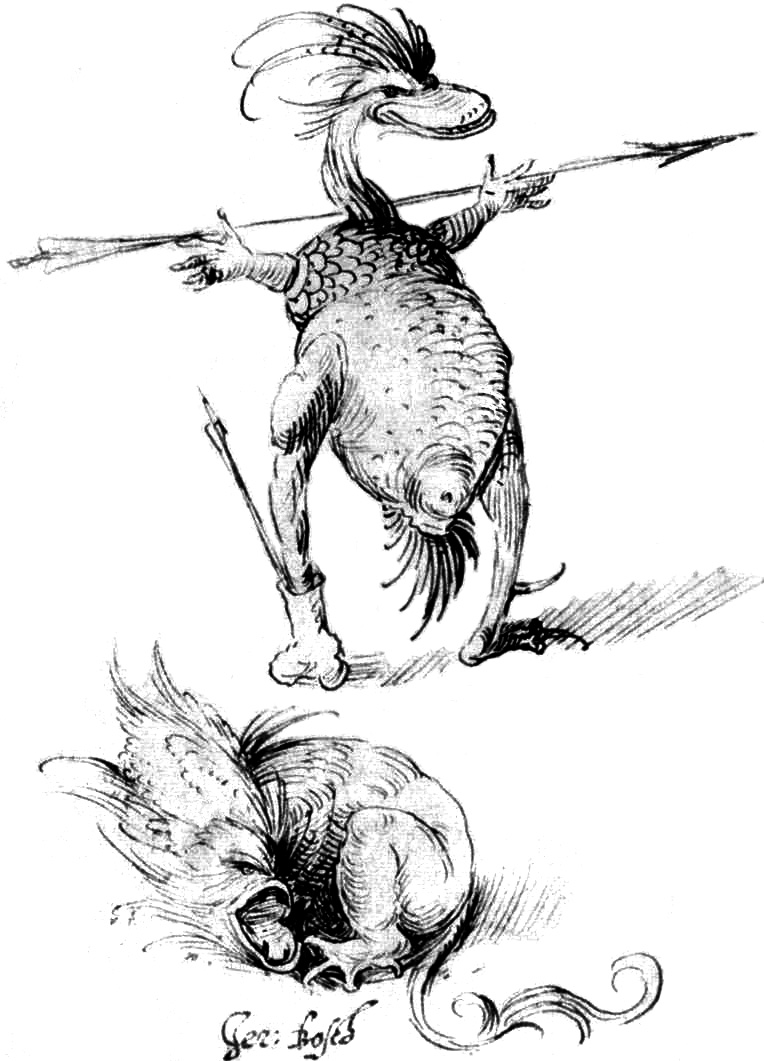
Sacrifice's art reminded video game journalist Kieron Gillen of the works (pictured) of Renaissance painter Hieronymus Bosch.

Initial reactions were favorable. Sacrifice's art was a point of focus for reviewers: the fantasy creatures' novel designs made deep impressions on the industry. The designs were so unconventional that gaming journalist Michael Eilers remarked, "It is as if Salvador Dalí and H. R. Giger got together and played around with 3D Studio Max for a few weeks with a cooler full of Bass Ale between them." To fellow journalist Kieron Gillen, Sacrifice resembled a version of the strategy game Command and Conquer as designed by Renaissance painter Hieronymus Bosch. Aside from being impressed by the details in the graphics, GameSpy's Lee Haumersen found the creatures' movements fluid and believable, remarking, "flying dragons heave their bodies through the air reminiscent of Draco in the movie Dragonheart." Tom Chick of Computer Gaming World summed up the weird experience of seeing his wizard at the head of "a troop of flapping, crawling, loping, whirling, hopping things" as the essence of "what gaming is all about."

The game's spell effects also elicited positive reactions. NextGen's Samuel Bass called them "awe-inspiring", while it was "positively breathtaking" for Eurogamer's John Bye to see "flaming missiles raining down on the battlefield, tornados lifting [his] men up into the sky, or the ground swelling up beneath [his wizard's] feet". Although such effects were implemented in other games, as Gillen pointed out, it was a vastly different experience to watch them from the first person perspective. Previewers of FiringSquad and PC Gamer UK were equally overwhelmed by the stunning visual effects. Despite filling the screen with "winged, fully animated demons" and "multiple gigantic twisters spiraling gorgeously into the clouds", Sacrifice performed smoothly on the previewers' machines, impressing the staff of Edge.

Aside from the visuals, the game's audio attracted comments. GameSpot's staff enjoyed listening to the story unfold through the recorded voices. They found that the voice actors did not overact their roles despite the extravagant appearances of the characters. Instead, the actors' performance conveyed an extra depth to the personalities of these characters. Haumersen noted a few flaws in the game's vocal presentation: the character models' lip movements did not match their speech, and they had a limited number of gestures to accompany the words. Michael L. House of AllGame was not altogether impressed, finding the voice acting to be "spotty[,] ... ranging from hilarious to obnoxious."

To several reviewers, Sacrifice was flawed in its handling of combat. They found that the game's interface—which presented a viewpoint that looked over the wizard from behind—hindered them from having a clear picture of their characters' surroundings. The game's fast-paced combat ensured that fights tended to be messy affairs, where aside from picking out their units from a chaotic mass to issue commands, players had to see to their wizards' safety, and cast spells to support their army. Reviewers commented that once a player had lost a number of early battles, their army could never recover from its losses to win the match. Sacrifice's multiplayer games, as GameSpot's Sam Parker observed, tended to be long-drawn stalemates until the wizards obtained more powerful spells. PC Zone's Keith Pullin was disappointed that the game was not designed to reward tactics; in his experience, he achieved victory by continually summoning groups of creatures to attack the enemy. Bass agreed that the game was lacking in tactical play, but other aspects impressed him enough to downplay this failing in his assessment.

The intensity and excitement generated by the frenetic gameplay pleased IGN's Dan Adams, but Bye was so frustrated by his experience that he claimed to have suffered a massive increase in blood pressure. The game's heavy demand for micromanagement convinced Maximum PC to name Sacrifice the "best argument for gamers [to grow] a third hand", an opinion in line with Chick's comment that the interface "[seemed] to have been designed for one of the game's 13-fingered beasts". Sacrifice's gameplay had its supporters; the staff at Edge, impressed with the game's controls and visual perspective, named it one of the "few titles [that took] strategy into the third dimension and convincingly used the extra plane for more than a dazzling 3D makeover".

Sacrifice was developed and released during a period of growth for the video games market; the amount United States consumers spent on video games increased from US$3.2 billion in 1995 to $6.0 billion in 2000. "Solid" real-time strategy games could sell more than 100,000 copies, and those that sold less than 75,000 units were considered commercial failures by the publishers. Many real-time strategy game developers concentrated on enhancing their game's visuals without concern for innovations in gameplay. Shiny was recognized by the industry for its unconventional games, which exhibited humorous content and unique artistic designs. When it became known that the company was developing Sacrifice as its first real-time strategy game, several industry observers were keen to see whether it could deliver a quality product.

No sales figures were released for Sacrifice, but several members of the video game industry acknowledged the game did not sell well. James Bell, Infogrames's Senior Vice President of Creative Development, said that Sacrifice, although an excellent game, suffered poor sales because it was badly marketed and released at the wrong time. Another reason, offered by Gillen, for Sacrifice's commercial failure was the small size of its development team. Based mostly on the efforts of four people, the game was built around their gaming preferences, failing to take into account the opinions of a wider variety; hence, the game became a niche product.

=== Awards and legacy ===
Impressing IGN with its "wonderful land full of character and imagination", Sacrifice was the gaming site's choice for the best strategy game of 2000 in its Best of 2000 Awards (but a runner-up for Readers' Choice), and was a runner-up for "Best Graphics" in both Editors' Choice and Readers' Choice. It was honored in the same year by European Computer Trade Show as the Best PC Game of the Show. During the 4th Annual Interactive Achievement Awards, Sacrifice was nominated for the "PC Strategy", "Computer Innovation", "PC Game of the Year", and "Game of the Year" awards, all of which went to Age of Empires II: The Conquerors, Deus Ex, and Diablo II (latter two), respectively. The game won the award for Strategy Game at Computer Gaming World's 2001 Premier Awards. It won the award for the RTS Game of the Year at the CNET Gamecenter Computer Game Awards for 2000, and was nominated for the Best Multiplayer Game award, which went to Earth 2150. It also won the award for "Best Graphics, Artistic" at GameSpot's Best and Worst of 2000 Awards, and was nominated for the "Best Sound" award, which went to The Sims. It was a runner-up for GameSpy's "2000 Strategy Game of the Year" award, which also went to The Sims. The staff called it "a strategy game at heart [...] with resource management and troop building playing a major part." The game did win the award for "Genre-Bender", though. The staff of Computer Games Magazine nominated it for their 2000 "Real-time Strategy Game of the Year" award, whose winner remains unknown. The game also won the award for "Best Graphics in a PC Game" and "Best Strategy Game for PC" awards at The Electric Playground's Blister Awards 2000, and was nominated for the "PC Game of the Year" and "Best Game of the Year" awards, both of which went to Deus Ex.

Since its release, Sacrifice had been one of PC Gamer UK's Top 100 Games for at least eight consecutive years. Looking back at the history of real-time strategy gaming, Geryk pointed out that Sacrifice's "depth and originality" was unparalleled in the genre and often overlooked in favor of its graphics. The staff of gaming site UGO shared a similar opinion, naming the game in 2010 as its eighteenth top strategy game of all time.

Although Sacrifice was honored as a quality game, industry observers pointed out that its qualities were forgotten by most people; the staff of GamesRadar+ said the game was "practically invisible to the gaming public", and according to Gillen, few remembered Sacrifice as the pioneer of the mouse-gesture control system, which was praised as revolutionary in Peter Molyneux's later game Black & White. Gillen further lamented that Sacrifice's release heralded the end of Shiny's forays into creative game development, as the company switched to producing more mainstream products, such as Enter the Matrix. Despite receiving numerous calls for a sequel, Shiny said in 2002 that it would not produce one. Years later, GamesRadar+ repeated the call for a sequel while proclaiming Sacrifice "one of the most underappreciated games of all time".
