= Madden NFL 2001 =

2000 American football video game

- North American PlayStation 2 box art, featuring Eddie George
- Developer: EA Tiburon (Note: Game Boy Color version developed by 3d6 Games and GameBrains.)
- Publisher: EA Sports
- Series: Madden NFL
- Platforms: PlayStation, PlayStation 2, Nintendo 64, Game Boy Color, Windows
- Release: August 14, 2000: PlayStation; NA: August 14, 2000; EU: October 6, 2000 Windows; NA: August 23, 2000; EU: October 6, 2000 Nintendo 64; NA: September 7, 2000 PlayStation 2; NA: October 17, 2000; EU: December 8, 2000 Game Boy Color; NA: November 8, 2000
- Genre: Sports (American football)
- Modes: Single-player, multiplayer

Madden NFL 2001 is a 2000 American football video game developed by EA Tiburon and published by EA Sports. It is the third in the Madden NFL series to include an NFL player, Tennessee Titans running back Eddie George, on its cover (the first being Madden NFL '95, which featured Erik Williams and Karl Wilson along with Madden himself). In addition, it is the first game in the series to have a player, instead of John Madden featured prominently on the box art. Madden's picture is shown on a small logo, which would reappear for every following game until Madden NFL 06. It is also the first game in the Madden NFL series to appear on the PlayStation 2 game console. This is the first Madden game to feature NFL Europe teams.

== Features ==
Madden NFL 2001 includes several customizable modes. Players have the ability to create a play, create a player, run a franchise, and collect Madden Cards, allowing players to perform certain actions during gameplay (for example, adding 5th downs, or limiting the CPU-controlled team to 3rd downs). The cards can also alter individual player ratings, unlock special stadiums, and unlock Hall of Fame and All-Madden teams.

Only the PC and PlayStation versions allow the player to create a team via the rosters menu, and the PlayStation 2 version have Madden Cards (297 total).

The best teams in the game overall were the Jacksonville Jaguars and the St. Louis Rams with a score of 95. The worst team in the game overall was the San Diego Chargers with the score of 70. The best offense in the game belongs to the St. Louis Rams with the score of 95. A 3-way tie for the best defense in the game belongs to the Tampa Bay Buccaneers, the Baltimore Ravens and the Jacksonville Jaguars with scores of 95. The best special teams in the game belong to the Denver Broncos with the score of 95.

The game also contains 35 Great Games that unlocks the additional teams and stadiums on PC, N64, and PS.

== Teams and stadiums ==
Madden NFL 2001 comes with over 50 teams and over 50 stadiums. Several of the teams and stadiums are fictional like the Mummies and the Marshalls. Each fictional team has its unique type of player (e.g. mummies players are mummies and the marshall's players are cowboys).

== Reception ==
Reception

Aggregate scores
Aggregator	Score				
Aggregator	GBC	N64	PC	PS	PS2
GameRankings	62%	85%	79%	89%	91%
Metacritic	N/A	89/100	78/100	90/100	91/100

Review scores
Publication	Score				
Publication	GBC	N64	PC	PS	PS2
CNET Gamecenter	N/A	8/10	7/10	9/10	8/10
Computer Gaming World	N/A	N/A	4.5/5	N/A	N/A
Electronic Gaming Monthly	N/A	9/10	N/A	9.33/10 (Note: In Electronic Gaming Monthly's review of the PlayStation version, two critics gave it each a score of 9.5/10, and the other gave it 9/10.)	9/10 (Note: Three critics of Electronic Gaming Monthly gave the PlayStation 2 version each a score of 9/10.)
Famitsu	N/A	N/A	N/A	N/A	35/40
Game Informer	N/A	8.75/10	N/A	8.75/10	9.75/10
GameFan	N/A	90% (Note: In GameFan's viewpoint of the Nintendo 64 version, one critic gave it 89, and the other 91.)	N/A	85% (Note: In GameFan's viewpoint of the PlayStation version, one critic gave it 85, and the other 84.)	91% (Note: In GameFan's viewpoint of the PlayStation 2 version, one critic gave it 94, and the other 88.)
GameRevolution	N/A	N/A	N/A	B−	A−
GameSpot	N/A	9.1/10	7/10	9.3/10	9.1/10
GameSpy	N/A	N/A	91%	93%	(T.W.) 94% (J.G.) 90%
IGN	N/A	8/10	8.7/10	9.4/10	9/10
Next Generation	N/A	N/A	N/A	N/A	5/5
Nintendo Power	6.2/10	8.1/10	N/A	N/A	N/A
Official U.S. PlayStation Magazine	N/A	N/A	N/A	5/5	4.5/5
PC Gamer (US)	N/A	N/A	83%	N/A	N/A
X-Play	N/A	N/A	N/A	N/A	5/5
Maxim	N/A	N/A	N/A	N/A	10/10
USA Today	N/A	N/A	N/A	N/A	4/4

Award
Publication	Award
OPM (UK)	Starplayer

The PlayStation and PlayStation 2 versions received "universal acclaim", while the Nintendo 64 and PC versions received "generally favorable reviews", according to the review aggregation website Metacritic. Rob Smolka of NextGen said of the PlayStation 2 version, "If you were looking for a reason to buy a PlayStation 2, this is it – superb gameplay, even better graphics, and enough substance to make you forget about all those other, weak launch titles." In Japan, where the same console version was ported and published by Electronic Arts Square under the name Madden NFL Super Bowl 2001 (マッデンNFLスーパーボウル2001, Madden NFL Sūpā Bouru 2001) on January 18, 2001, Famitsu gave it a score of 35 out of 40.

Official UK PlayStation Magazine gave the PlayStation version a score of nine out of ten and the Starplayer Award and said that it "expertly mixes arcade action with sim-deep stats and playbooks". Emmett Schkolven of Extended Play gave the PlayStation 2 version all five stars and said, "Madden NFL 2001 for the PS2 is the best-looking, smartest, most immersive game I have ever played. There's no comparing this game to anything else. From now on, all other sports titles will be compared to this."

Bro Buzz of GamePro said of the Nintendo 64 version, "For hardcore N64 football freaks, Madden NFL 2001 is all you need even as new console systems make their appearances. With the topnotch [sic] gameplay in this cart, you can give the Dreamcast, PlayStation 2, Dolphin, or even the Xbox all the time they need to produce a great football game." (Note: GamePro gave the Nintendo 64 version 4/5 for graphics, 3.5/5 for sound, 5/5 for control, and 4.5/5 for fun factor.) Brian Wright said, "If you're looking for football action on your PC this year, there's only one game in town...literally. Thankfully, Madden NFL 2001 offers enough features to please most computer gridiron fans." (Note: GamePro gave the PC version two 4.5/5 scores for graphics and sound, 3.5/5 for control, and 4/5 for fun factor.) Cheat Monkey said that the PlayStation version "delivers a realistic and deep pro football experience for this season. With all the experience the Madden team has under its belt, this veteran simulation scores a TD in overtime to take the PlayStation title for this year." (Note: GamePro gave the PlayStation version three 4/5 scores for graphics, sound, and control, and 4.5/5 for fun factor.) Human Tornado said, "Madden NFL 2001 for the PS2 is a sports gamer's dream come true. The great Madden gameplay is backed by a console system that finally has the power to show football action as it should be. It's fun to be this spoiled!" (Note: GamePro gave the PlayStation 2 version two 5/5 scores for graphics and fun factor, and two 4.5/5 scores for sound and control.)

Bryan Melville of AllGame gave the PlayStation version four-and-a-half stars out of five, calling it "the ultimate 32-bit football game. If you have the cash and the patience to wait, the PS2 version is undoubtedly a superior product. Still, the average player will be happy with the feel and look of the final Playstation version." Anthony Baize gave the PC version four stars, saying, "Overall, Madden NFL 2001 is a great game that perpetuates the tradition of quality games with the Madden nameplate. If you like football, you will love this game." Scott Alan Marriott gave the PlayStation 2 version the same score of four stars, saying, "When you factor in the Fantasy Mode, Madden Challenges, and crisp gameplay with the same control scheme as found in past Madden games, you have a winner for the PlayStation 2. The overall strength of NFL 2K1 on the Dreamcast keeps Madden from being the unanimous choice for best pigskin title of 2000, but you won't find a better version of the sport in this season's lineup -- on the consoles or the PC." However, William Abner of Computer Games Strategy Plus gave the PC version three-and-a-half stars out of five, saying, "If you are a Madden fan who isn't into playing online, then the decision as to whether or not it's worth another $45 bucks becomes a bit more difficult."

The game was a runner-up for GameSpot's annual "Best Graphics, Technical", "Best Nintendo 64 Game", "Best PlayStation Game", and "Best Sports Game (Traditional)" awards. The PC version was a finalist for the Sports award at Computer Gaming World's 2001 Premier Awards, which went to Sammy Sosa High Heat Baseball 2001. During the 4th Annual Interactive Achievement Awards, the Academy of Interactive Arts & Sciences nominated the PlayStation 2 version for the "Console Sports" and "Console Game of the Year" awards, both of which ultimately went to SSX; by virtue of being a "Console Game of the Year" nominee, the game was subsequently nominated for "Game of the Year", which eventually was awarded to Diablo II. The same console version was a runner-up for Sports Game of the Year 2000 award in Editors' Choice at IGN's Best of 2000 Awards, though it did win the same category in Readers' Choice, and was also a runner-up for Graphics of 2000 as well. The PlayStation version was a runner-up for the Sports award in both Editors' and Readers' Choice as well. The PS2 version was a runner-up for the "PlayStation 2 Game of the Year" award at EGM's 2000 Gamers' Choice Awards and Readers' Choice Awards, and for "Sports Game of the Year" in the latter Choice Awards. The same console version won the awards for "Best Sports Game" and "Best Graphics, PS2" at the Official U.S. PlayStation Magazine 2000 Editors' Awards, while the PlayStation version was a runner-up for the "Game of the Year, PS1" award, which went to Tony Hawk's Pro Skater 2.

Game Informer ranked the game 27th on their top 100 video games of all time list in 2001.

According to PC Data, Madden NFL 2001 sold 660,000 units in 2000 for the PlayStation 2.
