= Nintendo Gateway System =

Series of video game consoles specialized for airlines and hotels

- Developer: Nintendo; LodgeNet
- Manufacturer: Matsushita Avionics, Rockwell Collins, and Thales Avionics (airline version); LodgeNet (Hotel version)
- Product family: Super NES; Game Boy; Nintendo 64; GameCube
- Generation: Fourth; Fifth; Sixth
- Released: WW: August 10, 1993
- Availability: Airlines and hotels only; not for retail sale
- Lifespan: 1993–2012
- Discontinued: WW: 2008–2012
- Controller input: Armrest controller (airline version); Special versions of SNES, Nintendo 64, and GameCube controllers (hotel version)
- Backward compatibility: Not compatible with regular Nintendo systems

The Nintendo Gateway System is a series of video game consoles specialized for airlines and hotels. As part of a partnership between Nintendo and LodgeNet from late 1993 up until the late 2000s, about 40,000 airline seats and 955,000 hotel rooms featured a modified version of the Super Nintendo Entertainment System, Game Boy, Game Boy Color, Game Boy Advance, Nintendo 64 and GameCube, installed on some Northwest, Singapore Airlines, Air China, Air Canada, American Airlines, Alitalia-Linee Aeree Italiane, All Nippon Airways, British Midland International, Kuwait Airways, Malaysia Airlines, Thai Airways, and Virgin Atlantic passenger aircraft, as well as certain hotels with LodgeNet, NXTV, or Quadriga entertainment systems.

Aimed more at adults than Nintendo's core children's market, it was one of the first in-seat airline entertainment services, provided by Matsushita Avionics, Rockwell Collins, and Thales Avionics. The controller, or remote, for the airline version of the Gateway System had a button setup similar to the Super NES controller, and it also doubled as a remote for the movie and music aspects of the system. It was part of a much larger computer system that allowed air passengers to not only play video games, but also watch movies and shows, listen to music, talk on the phone, and even shop while in-flight, before the rise of the internet. Upon its release, there were 10 games installed in the system, which included The Legend of Zelda: A Link to the Past, F-Zero and Super Mario World. Future plans for the system were to have it installed on cruise ships as well.

LodgeNet partnered with Nintendo to bring video games directly into guest hotel rooms through streaming over the LodgeNet server, with the special LodgeNet controller plugging directly into the television or LodgeNet set-top box, transmitting the game over phone lines connected to a central game server. Pricing was usually $6.95 plus tax for 1 hour of video games. After 1 hour, the game would immediately stop and prompt the user to purchase more play time. Many games were modified for single-player play only.

Its official website was discontinued in mid-2008, but units have been seen as late as 2013 for Nintendo 64 in hotels, and as late as 2012 for Game Boy and Game Boy Color on Singapore Airlines. LodgeNet was the most widespread pay-per-view system for hotels that used it.

== History ==
On August 10, 1993, Nintendo of America began rolling out the Nintendo Gateway System, initially in one of Northwest Airlines' Boeing 747 and LodgeNet.

In late 1993, LodgeNet launched its on-demand hospitality service, including worldwide delivery of Super NES games to hotel guests via its proprietary building-wide networks. LodgeNet eventually reported the system being installed in 200,000 hotel guest rooms by April 1996, and 530,000 guest rooms by mid-1999. By April 1996, LodgeNet reported that its partnership with Nintendo to deliver Super NES games had yielded 200,000 worldwide hotel guest room installations. In June 1998, Nintendo and LodgeNet entered a 10-year licensing agreement for an "aggressive" upgrade to add Nintendo 64 support to their existing 500,000 Super NES equipped guest room installations. LodgeNet says that within the system's previous five years to date, the system had "caused Nintendo to become the most successful new product rollout in the history of the hotel pay-per-view industry". LodgeNet reported that within the middle of 1998 alone, 35 million hotel guests encountered the Nintendo name as an integral amenity, and it reported sales of more than 54 million minutes of Nintendo-based gameplay.

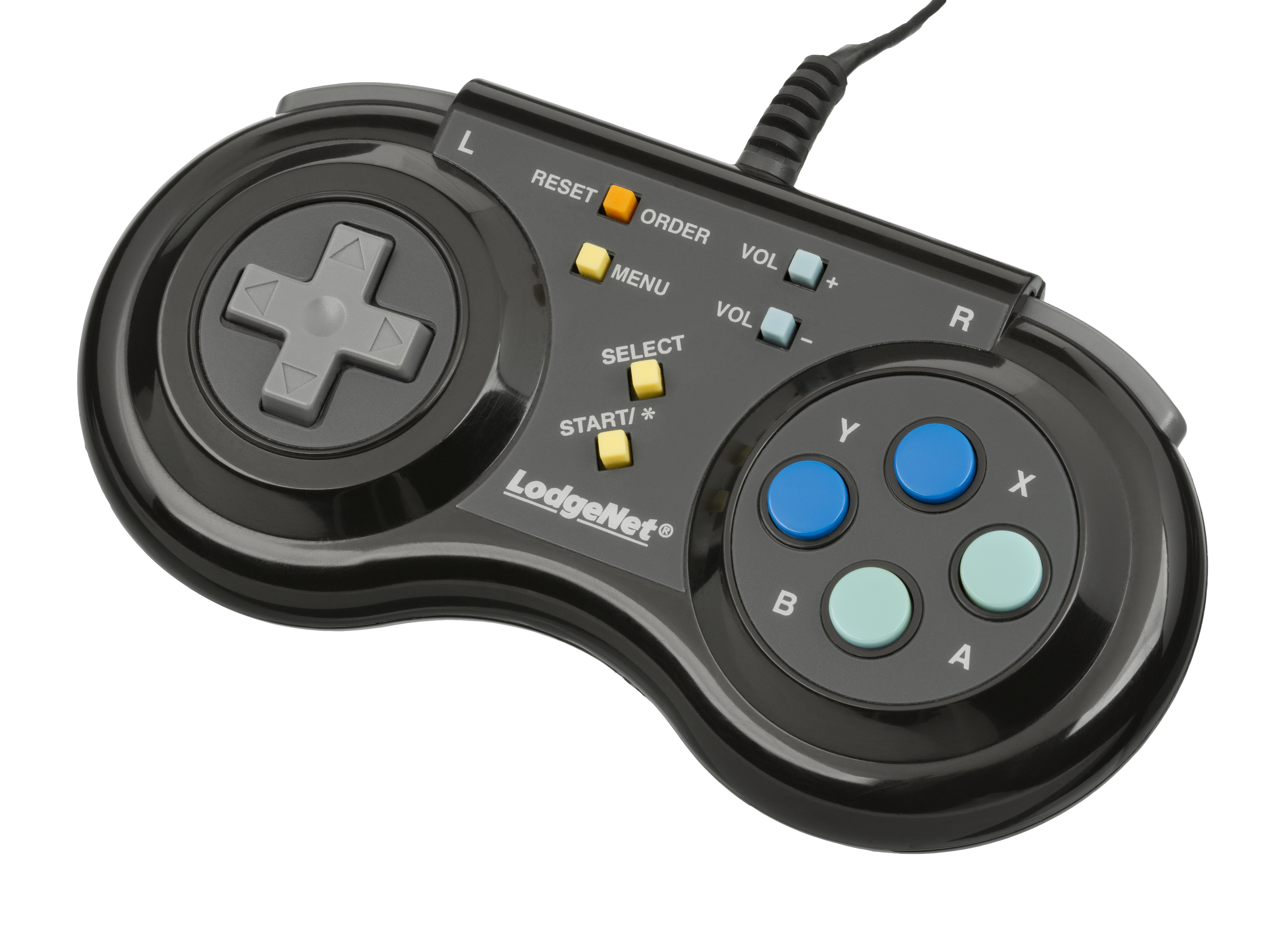
One of the two versions of the Super Nintendo LodgeNet controller

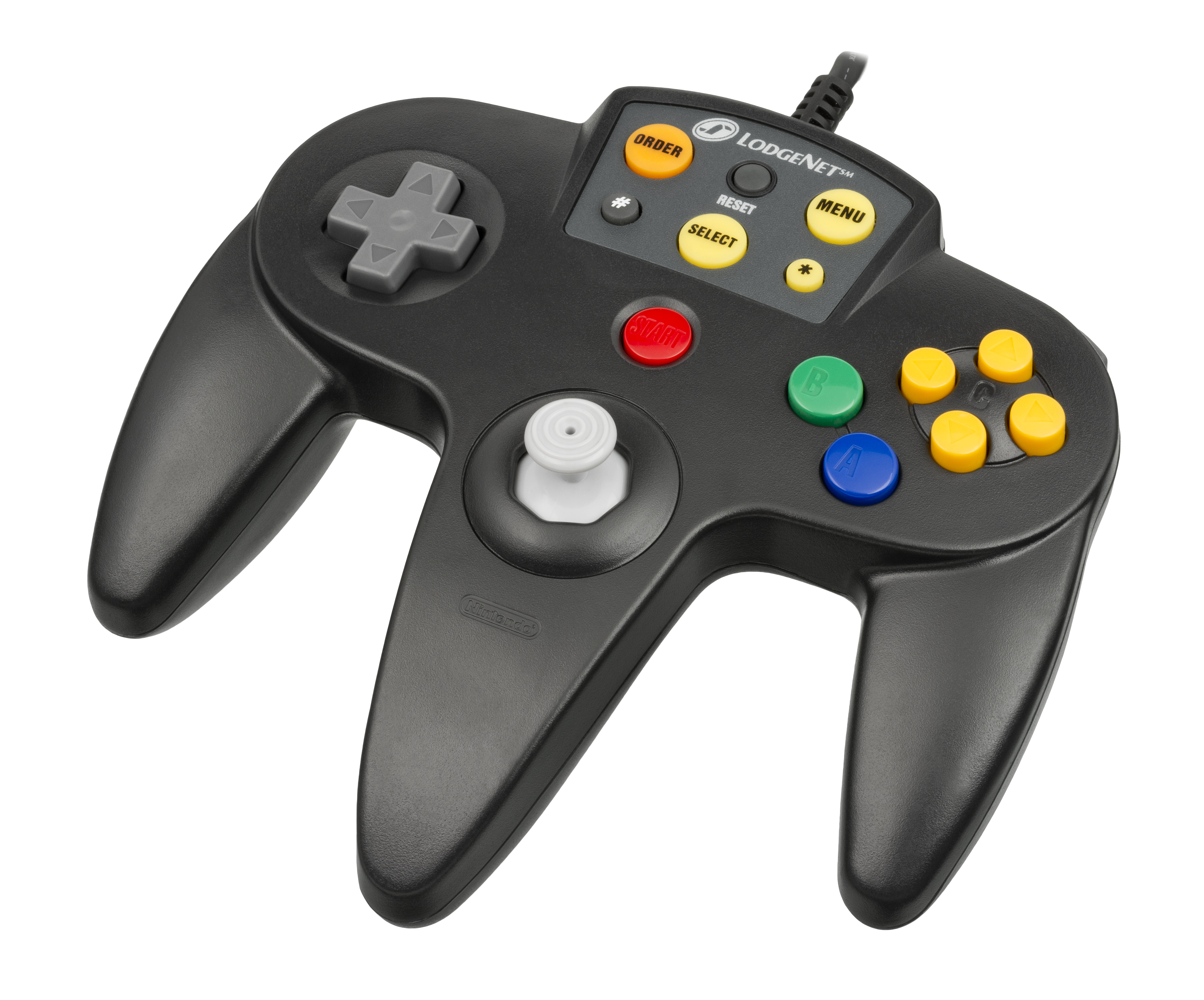
The Nintendo 64 LodgeNet controller, which could be used to play N64 games

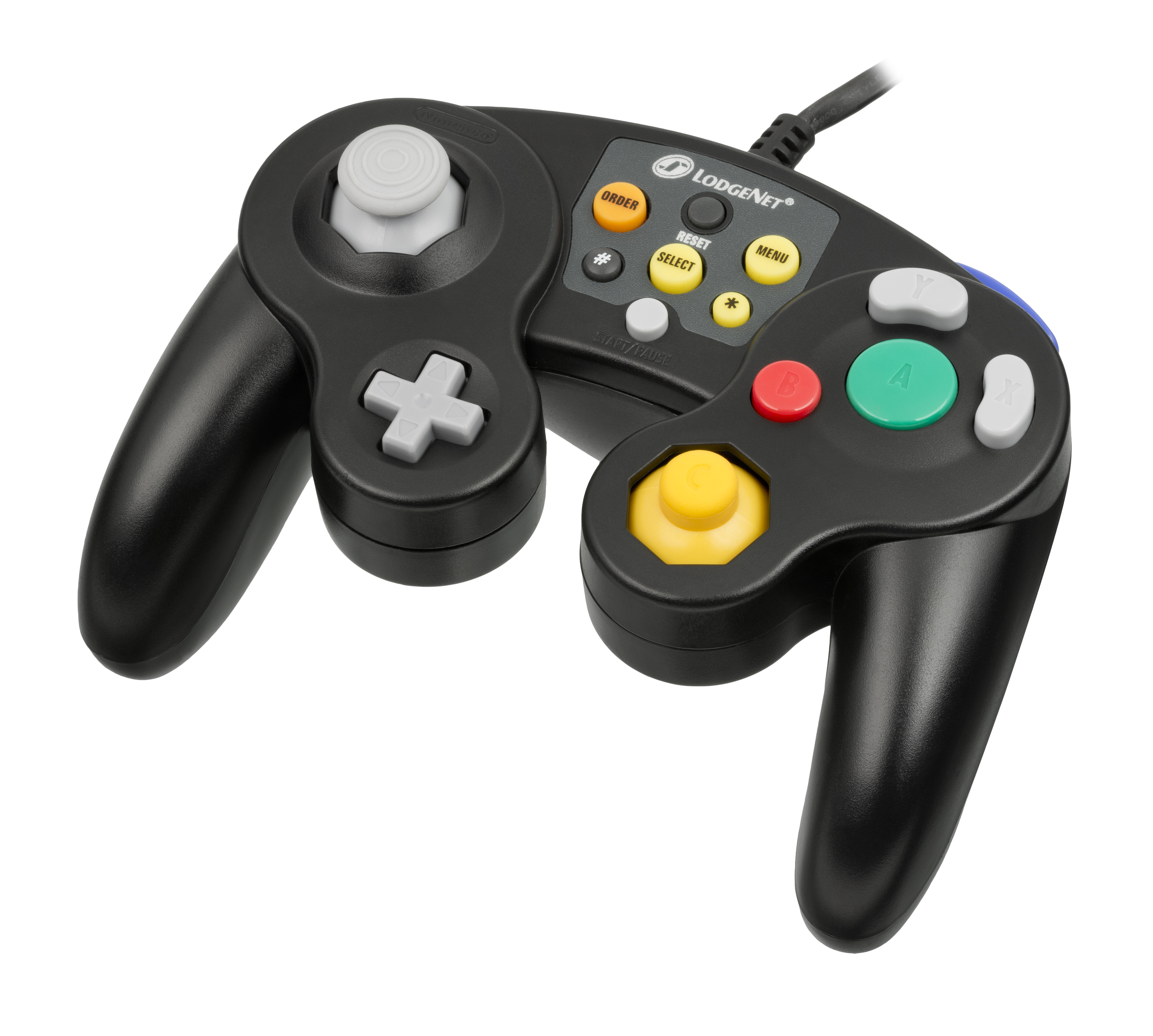
The LodgeNet GameCube controller. Hooked up to TVs in hotel rooms, it allowed patrons to pay to play GameCube games for limited time.

In June 1999, LodgeNet and Nintendo began expanding and upgrading their existing Super NES buildout to include Nintendo 64 support. In mid-1999, LodgeNet reported that its 530,000 hotel room installations were increasing at a rate of 11,000 rooms per month. In September 2000, Nintendo and LodgeNet began delivering newly released Nintendo 64 games to hotel rooms at more than 1,000 hotel sites, concurrently with the games' retail releases, demonstrating "the capacity to update LodgeNet's interactive digital systems with fresh content virtually overnight".

== Games ==
Games are offered for six Nintendo platforms, the Super Nintendo Entertainment System, the Game Boy, the Game Boy Color, the Game Boy Advance, the Nintendo 64, and the GameCube, with support for the Nintendo Entertainment System planned. While GB, GBC, and GBA games are exclusive to the airlines, the N64 and GC games are exclusive to the hotels, and the SNES is available for both.

=== Super Nintendo Entertainment System ===
There were 49 Super Nintendo Entertainment System titles available to play on LodgeNet hotel televisions and on airlines equipped with Nintendo Gateway System, which LodgeNet used for their hotel service. Some titles were not playable on airlines.

- Blackthorne
- Boogerman: A Pick and Flick Adventure (not available on airlines)
- Boxing Legends of the Ring
- The Brainies
- ClayFighter: Tournament Edition (not available on airlines)
- ClayFighter 2: Judgment Clay (not available on airlines)
- Claymates
- Donkey Kong Country
- Donkey Kong Country 2: Diddy's Kong Quest (not available on airlines)
- Dr. Mario (standalone, exclusive to the service)
- Final Fight
- F-Zero
- Hagane: The Final Conflict
- Hal's Hole in One Golf
- Hangman (exclusive to the service)
- Killer Instinct (not available on airlines)
- Kirby's Dream Course
- The Legend of Zelda: A Link to the Past
- The Lost Vikings
- The Lost Vikings 2
- Mega Man X
- NCAA Basketball (listed in a Nintendo Power article about the Gateway Service, unknown availability)
- Noughts & Crosses (exclusive to the service)
- Panel de Pon
- Postcard Puzzle (exclusive to the service)
- Prehistorik Man
- Pro Mahjong Kiwame
- Shanghai II: Dragon's Eye
- Street Fighter II: The World Warrior
- Street Fighter II: Hyper Fighting (not available on airlines)
- Super Adventure Island
- Super Bonk
- Super Ghouls 'n Ghosts
- Super Mario All-Stars
- Super Mario All-Stars + Super Mario World (unknown availability)
- Super Mario World
- Super Metroid (not available on airlines)
- Super Play Action Football
- Super Punch-Out!!
- Super Soccer
- Super Solitaire
- Super Street Fighter II (not available on airlines)
- Super Tennis
- True Golf Classics: Pebble Beach Golf Links (listed in a Nintendo Power article about the Gateway Service, unknown availability)
- Tetris (standalone, exclusive to the service)
- Tetris Attack
- Tetris & Dr. Mario
- Vegas Stakes
- Wario's Woods

=== Nintendo 64 ===
There were 38 Nintendo 64 titles available to play on LodgeNet hotel televisions.

- 1080° Snowboarding
- Donkey Kong 64
- Dr. Mario 64
- Excitebike 64
- Extreme-G
- F-Zero X
- Forsaken 64
- Gauntlet Legends
- Hydro Thunder
- Iggy's Reckin' Balls
- Kirby 64: The Crystal Shards
- The Legend of Zelda: Majora's Mask
- The Legend of Zelda: Ocarina of Time
- Mario Golf
- Mario Kart 64
- Mario Party 3
- Mario Tennis
- Midway's Greatest Arcade Hits
- Milo's Astro Lanes
- Mortal Kombat 4
- Namco Museum 64
- The New Tetris
- Paper Mario
- Pilotwings 64
- Pokémon Snap
- Rampage 2: Universal Tour
- Ready 2 Rumble Boxing
- Rush 2: Extreme Racing USA
- San Francisco Rush: Extreme Racing
- Star Fox 64
- Star Wars: Rogue Squadron
- Super Mario 64
- Super Smash Bros.
- Turok 2: Seeds of Evil
- Virtual Chess 64
- Virtual Pool 64
- Wave Race 64
- Yoshi's Story

=== GameCube ===
There were 43 GameCube titles available to play on LodgeNet hotel televisions.

- 1080° Avalanche
- Animal Crossing
- Backyard Baseball 2007
- Battalion Wars
- Chibi-Robo!
- Custom Robo
- Eternal Darkness: Sanity's Requiem
- Final Fantasy Crystal Chronicles
- Fire Emblem: Path of Radiance
- Geist
- Kirby Air Ride
- The Legend of Zelda: Collector's Edition (Note: Includes The Legend of Zelda, Zelda II: The Adventure of Link, The Legend of Zelda: Ocarina of Time, The Legend of Zelda: Majora's Mask, a 20-minute playable demo of The Legend of Zelda: The Wind Waker, a retrospective of The Legend of Zelda series, and a special movie of The Legend of Zelda: The Wind Waker. It is possible that some content may or may not be on this version, as this GameCube service already offers The Legend of Zelda: Ocarina of Time (with Master Quest alongside it), as well as The Legend of Zelda: The Wind Waker.)
- The Legend of Zelda: Four Swords Adventures
- The Legend of Zelda: Ocarina of Time Master Quest
- The Legend of Zelda: Twilight Princess
- The Legend of Zelda: The Wind Waker
- Luigi's Mansion
- Mario Golf: Toadstool Tour
- Mario Kart: Double Dash!!
- Mario Party 4
- Mario Party 5
- Mario Party 6
- Mario Party 7
- Mario Power Tennis
- Metroid Prime
- Metroid Prime 2: Echoes
- Paper Mario: The Thousand-Year Door
- Pikmin
- Pikmin 2
- Pokémon Channel
- Pokémon Colosseum
- Pokémon XD: Gale of Darkness
- Star Fox: Assault
- Star Wars Rogue Squadron II: Rogue Leader
- Star Wars Rogue Squadron III: Rebel Strike
- Super Mario Strikers
- Super Mario Sunshine
- TMNT
- Tomb Raider: Legend
- The Urbz: Sims in the City
- Wario World
- WarioWare, Inc.: Mega Party Games!
- Wave Race: Blue Storm

=== Game Boy and Game Boy Color ===
There were 33 Game Boy/Game Boy Color titles available to play on airlines featuring Nintendo Gateway System.

- Baseball
- Dr. Mario
- F1 Race
- Game & Watch Gallery
- Game & Watch Gallery 2
- Game & Watch Gallery 3
- Golf
- Kirby's Dream Land 2
- Kirby's Pinball Land
- Kirby's Star Stacker
- Mario Golf
- Mario Tennis
- Metroid II: Return of Samus
- Picross 2
- Pokémon Gold Version
- Pokémon Silver Version
- Pokémon Pinball
- Pokémon Puzzle Challenge
- Pokémon Red Version
- Pokémon Blue Version
- Pokémon Trading Card Game
- Pokémon Yellow Version
- Super Mario Bros. Deluxe
- Super Mario Land
- Super Mario Land 2
- Tennis
- The Legend of Zelda: Link's Awakening
- The Legend of Zelda: Oracle of Ages
- The Legend of Zelda: Oracle of Seasons
- Wario Land: Super Mario Land 3
- Wario Land II
- Wario Land 3
- Yakuman

=== Game Boy Advance ===
There were 13 Game Boy Advance titles available to play on airlines featuring Nintendo Gateway System.

- Advance Wars 2: Black Hole Rising
- Dr. Mario & Puzzle League
- Fire Emblem: The Blazing Blade
- Game & Watch Gallery 4
- Kirby: Nightmare in Dream Land
- Kirby & the Amazing Mirror
- Mario Kart: Super Circuit
- Mario Pinball Land
- Pokémon Pinball: Ruby & Sapphire
- Super Mario Advance 4: Super Mario Bros. 3
- Super Mario World: Super Mario Advance 2
- The Legend of Zelda: A Link to the Past
- Wario Land 4

== See also ==
- Nintendo 64 controller § LodgeNet variant
- Interactive television
- Smart TV
- Sonifi Solutions
