= Ready to Rumble (disambiguation) =

Ready to Rumble is a 2000 American comedy film.

Ready to Rumble may also refer to:

- "Ready to Rumble" (Ben 10 episode)
- "Let's get ready to rumble!", a catchphrase used in boxing by Michael Buffer
- Ready 2 Rumble Boxing, a video game
  - Ready 2 Rumble Boxing: Round 2
  - Ready 2 Rumble: Revolution
