= The Lost Vikings =

1993 video game

- North American SNES cover art
- Developer: Silicon & Synapse
- Publishers: Interplay Productions; Blizzard Entertainment (GBA)
- Designer: Ron Millar
- Composers: Charles Deenen; Allister Brimble (Amiga); Matt Furniss (Genesis)
- Platforms: Super Nintendo, Genesis, Amiga, MS-DOS, Amiga CD32, Game Boy Advance, Nintendo Switch, PlayStation 4, Windows, Xbox One
- Release: April 1993: SNES; NA: April 1993; EU: October 28, 1993 Amiga, DOS 1993 Genesis; NA: January 1994; EU: May 19, 1994 Amiga CD32; EU: 1994 Game Boy Advance March 2003 Nintendo Switch, PC, PS4, Xbox One; WW: February 20, 2021
- Genre: Puzzle-platform
- Modes: Single-player, multiplayer

The Lost Vikings is a 1993 puzzle-platform game developed by Silicon & Synapse (now Blizzard Entertainment) and published by Interplay Productions. In the game, the player controls three separate vikings with different abilities. The three vikings must work together to finish each level and find their way back home.

The game was initially released for the Super NES, then subsequently released for the Amiga, Amiga CD32, MS-DOS, and Mega Drive/Genesis. A sequel, The Lost Vikings 2, was released in 1997.

Blizzard re-released The Lost Vikings for the Game Boy Advance in 2003 and for Battle.net in 2014. In 2021, the game was re-released for Nintendo Switch, PlayStation 4, Windows, and Xbox One as part of the Blizzard Arcade Collection.

== Plot ==
Three Vikings—Erik the Swift, Baleog the Fierce, and Olaf the Stout—get kidnapped by Tomator, emperor of the alien Croutonian empire, for an inter-galactic zoo. They are able to escape the ship, but get lost in various periods of time. They must traverse various bizarre locations, and eventually confront and defeat Tomator, to find their way home.

== Gameplay ==
An in-game screenshot. In the main play area are the three playable characters (l-r): Olaf the Stout, Baleog the Fierce, and Erik the Swift.

The Lost Vikings is a side-scrolling platform adventure where the player alternates control of the three Viking characters, guiding each of them one at a time (though control may be swapped from character to character at any point) from a designated start point to the exit. The Mega Drive/Genesis version of the game offers a two-player cooperative mode in which each player simultaneously controls one Viking and is allowed to change control to the third, unused Viking at any point. Every level is designed so that each Viking must contribute his unique skills to help the other two through to the end. Similarly, to finish the level, all three characters must reach the exit point. Every Viking has three health points that can be lost by getting hurt by enemies or by falling from great heights. Any Viking that runs out of health points will die. Gameplay will then continue with the remaining Vikings, but the level becomes unwinnable, and the player will eventually have to restart and try again. However, the game offers unlimited continues.

Each Viking has the ability to carry and use items such as keys, bombs, and food (that restores health points). These items can also be swapped between characters as long as they are close to each other. Each Viking also has a unique set of skills:

- Erik can run faster than the other two, can jump, and can bash through some walls (and enemies) with his helmet.
- Baleog can kill enemies with his sword, or from a distance with his bow (and a "life-time supply of arrows"). The bow can also be used to hit switches from afar.
- Olaf can block enemies and their projectiles with his shield, and use his shield as a hang glider. Olaf's shield can also be used as a platform for Baleog to walk over and to allow Erik to reach higher areas.

The game consists of 37 levels and 42 levels in Mega Drive/Genesis version.

== Development ==
The Lost Vikings was initially influenced by the popular puzzle-based game, Lemmings. The original concept for the title had players managing hundreds of tiny onscreen vikings with different skills to defeat enemies and conquer enemy territory. However, as the game was to be developed primarily for consoles, developers realized that larger characters would work better for television screens and that players liked having direct control of the game characters. So they decreased the number of vikings down to five, then to three. Console limits on the number of onscreen colors also influenced the game's color palette, with the game's artists favoring more vibrant colors to stand out on a television screen.

== Release ==
The Lost Vikings was initially released by Interplay for the Super NES in 1993. Later in the year Interplay released versions of the game for the Amiga and MS-DOS. The following year, the company released versions for the Amiga CD32 and Mega Drive/Genesis. The Mega Drive/Genesis version contains five stages not present in any other version of the game, and can also be played by three players simultaneously. Blizzard re-released the game for the Game Boy Advance in 2003 and in 2014, the game was added to Battle.net, emulated through DOSBox. In celebration of Blizzard's 30th anniversary, The Lost Vikings was re-released for Nintendo Switch, PlayStation 4, Windows, and Xbox One as part of the Blizzard Arcade Collection in February 2021. The package includes both the SNES and Genesis versions, as well as the Definitive Edition which combines features from both versions such as the 3-player co-op mode and extra levels from the Genesis version.

== Cameo appearances ==
Both Olaf and Baleog make an appearance in the 1993 game Rock n' Roll Racing; Olaf can be unlocked as a hidden character, while Baleog appears on several billboards advertising "Viking Cola" on the planet Bogmire.

In the 32X version of Blackthorne, all three Vikings appear in a secret area in the second snow level.

The Lost Vikings have also had cameo appearances in Interplay's ClayFighter games: Olaf appeared in Helga's ending in the first ClayFighter, Helga being his girlfriend, but she later dumped him for Tiny; Erik and Baleog's faces appear as animated sculptures in the stage "Clay Keep" (Tiny's stage) in ClayFighter 2: Judgment Clay; in some interviews, Interplay designers hinted one of them would have appeared in the then upcoming ClayFighter III, but that never happened.

They have also appeared as NPCs in MMORPG World of Warcraft in the dungeon Uldaman. One of the quests in Uldaman also requires the player to collect the Shaft of Tsol and Amulet of Gni'Kiv, which spell out "Lost" and "Vik'ing" when read backwards. The shaft and amulet are combined to form the Staff of Prehistoria, which fits the theme of Uldaman and also is an area in The Lost Vikings. In the World of Warcraft: Cataclysm expansion, they feature prominently in a quest line for the Alliance faction in the Badlands area of Eastern Kingdoms. In World of Warcraft: Warlords of Draenor, Olaf can appear as one of the random daily quest NPCs if the players have the Frostwolf Tavern/Lunarfall Inn as a building in their Garrison. In World of Warcraft: Dragonflight, the three brothers come back to a new version of the Uldaman dungon: "Uldaman: Legacy of Tyr". This time, they are the first enemy boss to defeat, as their prolonged stay in the Titan underground complex maddened them.

In the Warcraft III: The Frozen Throne's "Monolith" scenario, the names for the Dark Troll Commando hero are the same as those for the Lost Vikings: Erik the Swift, Baleog the Fierce and Olaf the Stout.

A flying unit in StarCraft II is called the Viking, and there is a picture of the unit on their website, subtitled The Lost Vikings. In addition, repeatedly selecting the Viking unit in StarCraft II makes the Viking pilot mention Erik, Baleog, and Olaf getting lost, as he tries to contact them. He also sets in coordinates for Norse by Norse-west. There is also an arcade console in the Cantina of Battleship Hyperion in StarCraft II called The Lost Viking, which is a mini playable vertically scrolling shooter game featuring the Viking unit in StarCraft II.

The Lost Vikings reprised their role as playable characters in the crossover multiplayer online battle arena video game Heroes of the Storm. Unlike other heroes in the game, who are played as a single unit, selecting the Lost Vikings as a hero gives the player control over all three Vikings. This allows the player to control them as individuals or issue commands to all three at once. Erik is faster than most other heroes, and attacks from range with a slingshot. Baleog has the greatest attack power of the three, and throws swords from a medium range, dealing area damage to enemies near his target. Olaf has the highest health pool, and recovers quickly when he is not in combat.

== Reception ==
Reception

Review scores
Publication	Score
AllGame	4/5 (SNES); 3.5/5 (SMD)
Aktueller Software Markt	11/12; 10/12 (CD32)
Amiga Computing	84%
Amiga Format	79% 72% (CD32)
Amiga Power	87%
Computer and Video Games	88/100 (SMD); 90/100 (SNES)
Electronic Gaming Monthly	8/10, 6/10, 6/10, 7/10, 7/10 (SMD); 30/40 (SNES)
GamePro	17/20
GamesMaster	90%
GameSpot	7.1/10
GameZone	7.9/10
IGN	8.5/10
Jeuxvideo.com	16/20
Mean Machines Sega	84/100
Mega Fun	83/100
Nintendo Power	14.2/20
Total!	87%
Video Games (DE)	80% (SMD); 78% (SNES)
VideoGames & Computer Entertainment	9/10 (SNES)
The One	90%

Computer Gaming World in 1993 called The Lost Vikings "a clever blend of comedy and role playing". The magazine concluded that "the game is a unique puzzle solving adventure, great for people who enjoy using their cerebral cortex along with their eye to hand coordination". Zach Meston of VideoGames & Computer Entertainment praised the difficult puzzles, humor, distinctive visual style, personable character animation, and upbeat music. He summarized the game as "funny, fresh and challenging enough to keep you playing for hours on end".

Electronic Gaming Monthly in 1994 remarked of the Genesis version that "the music doesn't have the kick of the Super NES version (or the truly colorful graphics)", but it is generally a well done conversion of "a really good puzzle game". AllGame stated it was "methodically paced and intelligently designed" and that "the nice graphics combined with the funny (and sometimes helpful) dialogue gives The Lost Vikings more personality than most other video games. To top it off, the controls are sharp, and the level of challenge is high without being frustrating". Super Gamer magazine gave the SNES version a score of 92%, writing: "A huge variety of puzzles to this Lemmings game. Funny, fun and completely addictive".

=== Accolades ===
Nintendo Power ranked The Lost Vikings the seventh-best SNES game of 1993. They lauded the gameplay, calling it "deep and compelling" and praised the graphics and sound. Mega placed the game at number 22 in their Top Mega Drive Games of All Time. In 1995, Total! placed the game 52nd on its Top 100 SNES Games. In 1996, Super Play awarded the game 94th in its Top 100 SNES Games of All Time. IGN listed The Lost Vikings 30th in their "Top 100 SNES Games of All Time. They praised the game calling it a "Masterpiece" and praised the "nearly perfect" puzzle dynamics. In 2018, Complex rated The Lost Vikings 93rd on their "The Best Super Nintendo Games of All Time".

== See also ==
- Gobliiins, an earlier puzzle-solving game dependent on three different characters
- Fish Fillets NG
- Trine
