= Michael Buffer =

American ring announcer

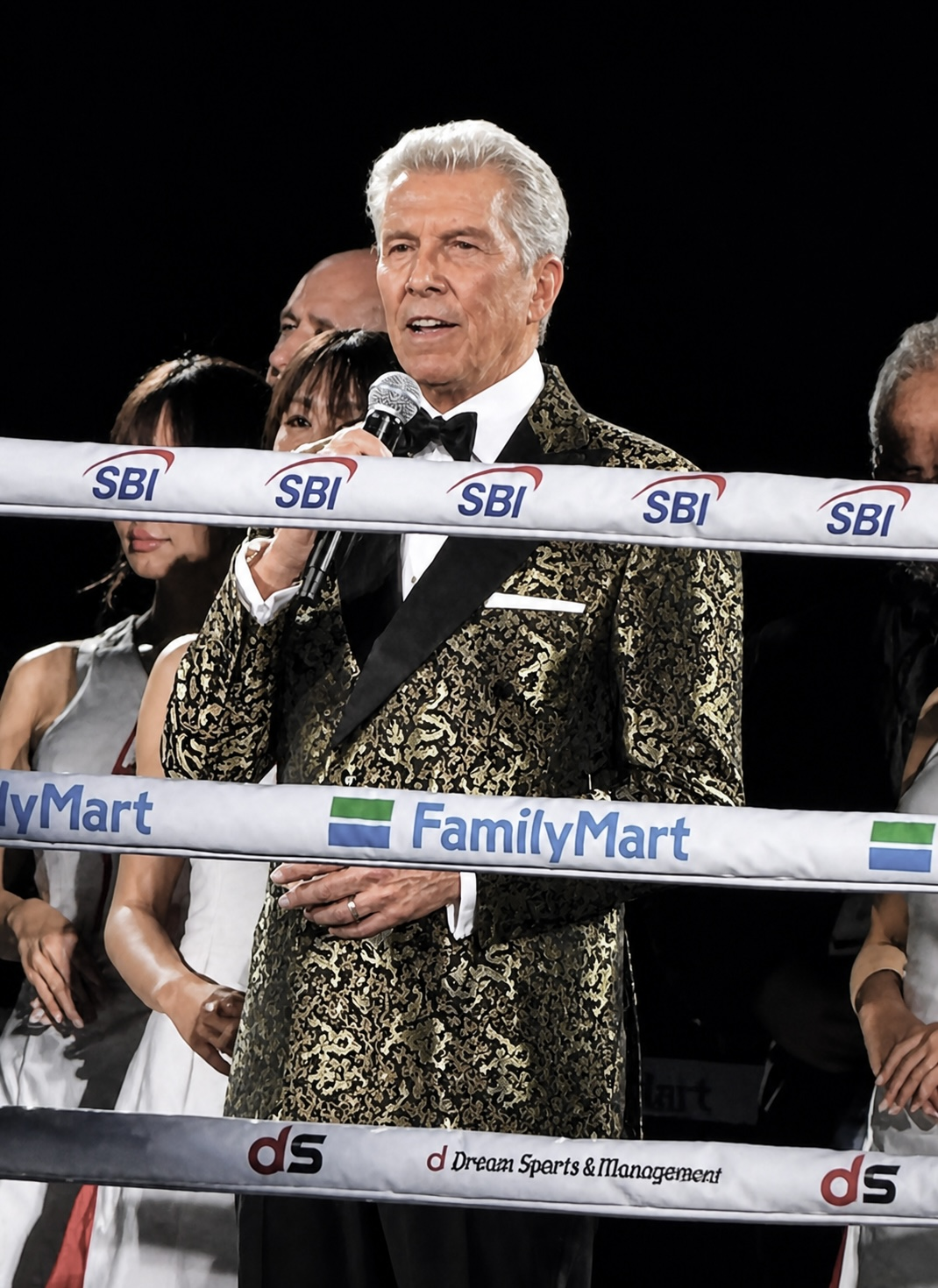
- Buffer in 2026
- Born: November 2, 1944 (age 82); Philadelphia, Pennsylvania, U.S.
- Occupations: Ring announcer, actor
- Years active: 1982–present
- Known for: "Let's get ready to rumble!" catchphrase
- Children: 2
- Relatives: Bruce Buffer (half-brother)

Michael Buffer (born November 2, 1944) is an American ring announcer (or "MC") for boxing, professional wrestling, and National Football League events. Pioneering a distinct announcing style in which he rolls certain letters and adds other inflections to a fighter’s name, and known for his trademarked catchphrase: "Let's get ready to rumble!", he was inducted into the International Sports Hall of Fame in 2019.

== Early life ==
Buffer was born in Philadelphia, Pennsylvania on November 2, 1944. His father was enlisted in the United States Navy during World War II. Buffer's parents divorced when he was 11 months of age, and he was then raised by foster parents, a school bus driver and housewife, in Roslyn, Pennsylvania. He enlisted in the United States Army during the Vietnam War at age 20 and served until age 23. He held various jobs, including a car salesman, then began a modeling career at age 32 before becoming a ring announcer at age 38.

== Career ==
=== Boxing ===
In 1982, Buffer began his career as a ring announcer. By 1983, he was announcing all boxing matches promoted by Bob Arum's Top Rank on ESPN, which gave him a national identity at a time when ring announcers were strictly locally hired talent. By 1984, Buffer developed the catchphrase "Let's get ready to rumble!" in his announcing, which gained enormous popularity. He began the process of obtaining a federal trademark for the phrase in the 1980s, acquiring it in 1992. Consequently, Buffer has earned in excess of $400 million with the license for his trademark.

In 1991, Buffer signed a deal with HBO and became a permanent ring announcer on World Championship Boxing and on occasion he would sub for Jimmy Lennon Jr. on rival network Showtime on Showtime Championship Boxing and Lennon would occasionally sub for Buffer on HBO as well.

In 2018, Buffer signed with DAZN to serve as the exclusive ring announcer for all of its boxing broadcasts, which include deals with Matchroom.

=== Wrestling ===
Buffer was formerly the exclusive ring announcer for World Championship Wrestling (WCW) main events featuring Hulk Hogan or other top WCW talent until 2001, when the organization folded. WCW's former parent company Time Warner owned through their pay-per-view subscription division HBO, which broadcast many matches from promoter Top Rank, of which Buffer is the lead ring announcer. The exclusivity of his contract with WCW prevented Buffer from announcing for other wrestling-type organizations, forcing him to stop announcing for the UFC (his only UFC cards were UFC 6 and UFC 7). However, when WCW ceased to exist, and Time Warner had no more affiliation with professional wrestling, Buffer was enabled to announce in other wrestling promotions. During the Monday Night War, while Buffer was on WCW Monday Nitro, WWF wrestler Triple H created the phrase "Let's get ready to suck it!" to mock him, as part of his D-Generation X gimmick.

On Saturday Night's Main Event XXXV, for the first time in more than six years, Buffer returned to pro-wrestling ring announcing duties at Madison Square Garden in a boxing match between pro boxer Evander Holyfield (who was substituting for Montel Vontavious Porter) and pro wrestler Matt Hardy. Buffer appears in the Royal Rumble 2008 advertisement, in which he begins to say "Let's get ready to rumble!" only to be superkicked by Shawn Michaels, causing him to fall over. As well as being in the commercial for the event, he was the guest ring announcer during the Royal Rumble match itself.

=== Other sports ===
During his career, Buffer has announced the MLB World Series, the Stanley Cup Final, NBA Finals, the Volunteer 500 at Bristol Motor Speedway, and NFL playoff games. He was a guest announcer at the 1999 Indianapolis 500 and the 2017 United States Grand Prix.

Buffer, like his brother Bruce, announced early UFC fights, starting at UFC 6 in 1995. He was the host of the Versus boxing retro show Legends of the Ring, produced by Top Rank, Inc., where he was ring announcer for most of their top matches.

On July 19, 2008, he announced the Affliction: Banned mixed martial arts show. On November 10, 2008, Buffer started the heads-up action between the two remaining players, Peter Eastgate and Ivan Demidov at the 2008 World Series of Poker final table with a modified version of his trademark statement: "Let's get ready to shuffle up and deal."

On September 12, 2021, Buffer announced for NBC's Sunday Night Football matchup, where the Los Angeles Rams hosted the Chicago Bears at the first regular season NFL game with fan attendance in SoFi Stadium. He later announced at the Rams' first home playoff game against the Arizona Cardinals on January 17, 2022, and two weeks later, during the 2022 NFC Championship game against the San Francisco 49ers.

On June 28, 2024, Buffer announced his hometown Philadelphia Flyers's 13th overall pick of the first round of the 2024 NHL entry draft at the Sphere in Vegas using his trademarked catchphrase, introducing draft pick Jett Luchanko with his height and weight like Buffer would in the ring, along with Luchanko's previous team.

In February 2025, Buffer made the trip to England to announce the opening match of the Super League season at the Brick Community Stadium between defending champions the Wigan Warriors and local rivals the Leigh Leopards.

He also made appearances at pre-matches of semi-finals and the final of the 2025 FIFA Club World Cup

=== Other appearances ===
Buffer has appeared on various talk shows hosted by Jay Leno, David Letterman, Arsenio Hall, Conan O'Brien, Jimmy Kimmel, and Jimmy Fallon. He has also appeared on Saturday Night Live, In Living Color, Mad TV and The Howard Stern Show.

He appeared on NBC's Deal or No Deal on December 10, 2007, and opened the finale of the seventh season of American Idol, a production of RTL. In 2011, he made an appearance on the 12th season of Dancing with the Stars to announce Sugar Ray Leonard week 3 dance. Buffer has also served as ringside announcer for the syndicated television game show The Grudge Match, hosted by Steve Albert and Jesse Ventura.

In the 1997 film Hercules, Hades uses Buffer's catchphrase "Let's get ready to rumble!" during Hercules' fight with Hydra.

He has played himself in various films including Ready to Rumble and Rocky Balboa, and in 2008 Buffer appeared as Walbridge, the main villain in the comedy You Don't Mess with the Zohan. His "Let's get ready to rumble!" soundbite is used briefly in the 2004 film Scooby-Doo 2: Monsters Unleashed. He also appeared in the 2019 remake of Dumbo, portraying a ringmaster who delivers the line "Let's get ready for Dumbo!" in his trademark cadence.

Buffer has been animated in The Simpsons, South Park, and Celebrity Deathmatch. Buffer also appears in the animated TV series Phineas and Ferb in the episode "Raging Bully", as the voice of the announcer for the big thumb-wrestling match with Phineas and Buford. Buffer appeared in the extended version of the Muppets webisode "Food Fight", where he is seen announcing the cooking competition between Gordon Ramsay and the Swedish Chef.

He's regularly featured in music, including on the introductory track of Tupac Shakur's All Eyez on Me—his voice here was originally intended for a separate track titled "Let's Get Ready to Rumble", which did not appear on the final album. He appears as featuring artist on "Let's Get Ready to Rumble" and "Go for It All!" by German eurodance group the K.O.'s and his voice was sampled in the Ant & Dec song "Let's Get Ready to Rhumble". He recorded the introduction track for country artist Josh Turner's 2012 album, Punching Bag.

Early in 2011, Buffer appeared in a large-scale advertising campaign to mark the 50th anniversary of German electronics retailer Saturn.

In 2013, Buffer appeared in Progressive Insurance commercials, promoting their program of combining different coverages into one policy, with a parody of his famous phrase – "Let's get ready to bundle!"

Buffer reproduced as an action figure in both Toy Biz's WCW line and Jakks Pacific's Rocky line.

In 2022, Buffer introduced Daddy Yankee's final album Legendaddy.

Buffer was confirmed as the master of ceremonies for Probellum: Revolution at Dubai's Coca-Cola Arena on Saturday, December 11.

=== Trademark ===
Buffer began using the phrase "Let's get ready to rumble!" in 1984. By 1992, he acquired a federal trademark for the phrase. Buffer uses his famous phrase in various licensing deals including the platinum selling album Jock Jams by Tommy Boy Records, the video games Ready 2 Rumble Boxing, Ready 2 Rumble Boxing: Round 2 for the PlayStation 2, Nintendo 64, Dreamcast and Game Boy Advance and Greatest Heavyweights for the Sega Genesis and numerous other products. In addition, he has used variations of the phrase in advertisements, including the popular commercial for Mega Millions in which he says "Let's get ready to Win Big!" and the Kraft Cheese commercial in which he says "Let's get ready to Crumble!" and most recently for Progressive Insurance in which he says "Let's get ready to bundle!" As of 2009, the catchphrase has generated $400 million in revenue from licensing the trademark.

== Personal life ==
Buffer's fame has reunited him with long-lost family members. In 1989, he was contacted by his birth father, who introduced him to his half-brothers after seeing him on television. In the mid-1990s, Buffer brought along one of his half-brothers, Bruce Buffer, as his agent/manager. This grew into a business partnership to increase licensing productivity of the trademark.

Buffer’s first marriage was at age 21, but the marriage ended in divorce after seven years. He has two sons from his first marriage. More than 25 years passed before he remarried in 1999. He and his second wife divorced in 2003.

On September 13, 2007, while making an appearance on The Tonight Show with Jay Leno, Buffer proposed to his current (third) wife, Christine. He resides in Southern California. His half-brother Bruce is an announcer for the Ultimate Fighting Championship, a leading mixed martial arts promotion.

In 2008, Buffer was treated for throat cancer.

== Filmography ==
Film
Year	Title	Role	Notes
1988	Homeboy	Ring announcer	
1989	Harlem Nights	Ring announcer	
1990	Rocky V	Himself/Ring announcer	
1995	Virtuosity	Emcee	
1999	Play It to the Bone	Himself/Ring announcer	
2000	The Extreme Adventures of Super Dave	Himself/Sports commentator	Direct-to-video
2000	Ready to Rumble	Himself/Ring announcer	
2003	More Than Famous	Himself	
2003	Game Over	Himself/Ring announcer	
2003	Dickie Roberts: Former Child Star	Himself	
2004	Fade to Black	Himself	
2004	Against the Ropes	Himself/Ring announcer	
2005	The L.A. Riot Spectacular	Himself	
2006	Rocky Balboa	Himself/Ring announcer	
2006	BoxinBuddies: Knockout Juvenile Diabetes	Mik O' Tux	Animated short
2008	Cornered: A Life Caught in the Ring	Himself	
2008	You Don't Mess with the Zohan	Grant Walbridge	
2009	2012	Himself/Ring announcer	
2010	Love and Other Drugs	Pfizer Convention MC	
2010	The Fighter	Fight announcer	
2011	The Green Card Tour: Live from The O2 Arena	Himself/Announcer	Russell Peters direct-to-video comedy special
2012	Vanilla Ice Archive	Himself	
2013	Maravilla, la película	Himself	
2013	Grudge Match	Himself/Ring announcer	
2015	Creed	Himself/Ring announcer	
2018	Creed II	Himself/Ring announcer	
2018	Holmes & Watson	Himself	
2019	Dumbo	Baritone Bates	
2021	Rumble	Stoker Announcer	

Television
Year	Title	Role	Notes
1985–present	Top Rank on ESPN	Himself/Ring announcer	Numerous episodes of both the original ESPN series and the 2017 ESPN revival
1988–2017	HBO Boxing	Himself/Ring announcer	57 episodes
1989	Showtime Championship Boxing	Himself/Ring announcer	Episode dated November 4, 1989
1991–1992	The Grudge Match	Himself/Ring announcer	
1991–2017	Sky Sports World Championship Boxing	Himself/Master of Ceremonies	
1992	Evander Holyfield vs. Riddick Bowe	Himself	
1993	Fallen Champ: The Untold Story of Mike Tyson	Himself	
1994	Evander Holyfield vs. Michael Moorer	Himself	
1994	Saturday Night Live	Himself	Season 20 episode 9: "George Foreman/Hole"; Uncredited
1995	Mad TV	Himself	Season 1 episode 4: "Life With Buffer"
1996	Weird Science	Himself	Season 4 episode 2: "Men in Tights"
1996	The Simpsons	Himself/Ring announcer	Season 8 episode 3: "The Homer They Fall"
1998	Monday Nitro	Himself	3 episodes
1998	South Park	Himself	Season 1 episode 10: "Damien"
1998–2000	Celebrity Deathmatch	Himself	Pilot: "Deathbowl '98"; Season 2 episode 1: "Deathbowl '99"; Season 3 episode 1: "Deathbowl 2000"
1999	Mad About You	Announcer #2	Season 7 episode 17: "Separate Beds"
2000	Clerks	Himself	Season 1 episode 4: "A Dissertation on the American Justice System by People Who Have Never Been Inside a Courtroom, Let Alone Know Anything About the Law, But Have Seen Way Too Many Legal Thrillers"
2002	Celebrity Boxing	Himself/Ring announcer	
2002	Inside Schwartz	Himself	Episode: "It's All in the Footwork"; No official date for the episode as it went unaired
2002–2013	Promi-Boxen	Himself/Ring announcer	
2003	Man vs. Beast	Himself	
2003	Maximum Surge	Himself/Ring announcer	TV film
2004	Open Access	Himself	Season 1 episode 4: "Miami"
2004	Jeopardy!	Himself/Video clue presenter	Season 20 episode 170: aired April 30, 2004
2004	Las Vegas	Himself/Contest announcer	Season 1 episode 11: "Blood and Sand"; Season 1 episode 20: "The Strange Life of Bob"
2004	Extreme Makeover: Home Edition	Himself	Season 2 episode 10: "The Broadbent Family"
2005	50 Hottest Vegas Moments	Himself	
2005	Entourage	Himself	Season 2 episode 6: "Chinatown"
2006	Legends of the Ring	Himself/host	Unknown episodes
2007	Polizeistund' ade - Das Abschiedskonzert von Klaus & Klaus	Himself	
2007	The World Awaits: De La Hoya vs. Mayweather	Himself	
2007	Saturday Night's Main Event XXXV	Himself	Season 2 episode 2: August 18, 2007
2007	BET Awards	Himself	
2007	Janice & Abbey	Himself	Season 1 episode 5: "Success?"
2007	Deal or No Deal	Himself	Season 3 episode 20: aired December 10, 2007
2008	Phineas and Ferb	Event announcer	Season 1 episode 6: "Raging Bully"
2008	RAW	Himself	Season 16 episode 10
2008	American Idol	Himself	Season 7 episode 41: The Final Two Perform
2009	Pacquiao vs. Hatton: The Battle of East and West	Himself	
2009	The Great Debate	Himself/host/Emcee	
2010	The Bold and the Beautiful	Himself	Episodes #5965 and #5966
2011	Lucian Bute: L'Homme, L'Athlète	Himself	
2012	America's Next Top Model	Himself	Cycle 18 episode 1: Kelly Osbourne
2012	NBC Sports Network Fight Night	Himself/Ring announcer	
2013	Legendary Nights	Himself	Season 2 episode 1: "The Tale of Gatti-Ward"
2014	Who Is...	Himself	1 episode
2015	Inside Mayweather vs. Pacquiao	Himself	2 episodes
2015	At Last: Mayweather vs. Pacquiao	Himself	Television Documentary
2015	30 for 30	Himself	Episode: "Chasing Tyson"
2017	Mano a Mano: The Battle for Mexico	Himself	
2017	2017 United States Grand Prix	Announcer	

Video games
Year	Title	Role	Notes
1993	Prize Fighter	Himself/Announcer	
1996	Pitball	Announcer	
1997	ClayFighter 63⅓	Announcer	
1999	Ready 2 Rumble Boxing	Himself	
2000	Ready 2 Rumble Boxing: Round 2	Himself/Rumbleman	
2009	Ready 2 Rumble: Revolution	Himself/Rumbleman	

== Discography ==
=== As a featured artist ===
List of singles as a featured artist, with selected chart positions, showing year released
Title	Year	Peak chart positions
Title	Year	GER
"Let's Get Ready to Rumble" (with K.O.'s)	1996	20
"Go for It All!" (with K.O.'s)	1996	—
"—" denotes a recording that did not chart in that territory.

== See also ==
- Chuck Hull
- Jimmy Lennon
- Jimmy Lennon Jr.
