= ClayFighter =

Video game series

- Genre: Fighting
- Developers: Visual Concepts, Interplay
- Publisher: Interplay
- First release: ClayFighter; 1993
- Latest release: ClayFighter: Sculptor's Cut; 1998
- Spin-offs: Claymates

ClayFighter is a fighting/beat 'em up series of video games. The series has character sprites rendered from clay-animated figures, and parodies other fighting games such as Street Fighter and Mortal Kombat.

ClayFighter: Tournament Edition and ClayFighter: Sculptor's Cut were only released as rental games from Blockbuster LLC in the United States.

== Recurring characters ==
- Bad Mr. Frosty - a bad snowman and the main character of the series, as well as being the only character to appear on all the cover art
- Blob - a green blob of clay and the main character of the series
- Bonker - a bad clown appears in all five games in the series, but only playable in four
- Hoppy - a yellow rabbit appears in three games in the series, he is a spoof of Terminator
- Ickybod Clay - a scarecrow-like ghost with a pumpkin head appears in four games in the series
- Taffy - a yellow fighting piece of taffy appears in all five games in the series, but only playable in four
- Tiny - a buff, large-toothed wrestler appears in three games in the series

Character	ClayFighter (Tournament Edition)	C2: Judgment Clay	63⅓	Sculptor's Cut
Bad Mr. Frosty	Yes	Yes	Yes	Yes
Blob	Yes	Yes	Yes	Yes
Blue Suede Goo	Yes	No	No	No
Boogerman	No	No	Yes	Yes
Bonker	Yes	No	Yes	Yes
Butch	No	Yes	No	No
Dr. Kilnklein	No	No	Yes	Yes
Dr. Peelgood	No	Yes	No	No
Earthworm Jim	No	No	Yes	Yes
Googoo	No	Yes	No	No
Helga	Yes	No	No	No
High Five	No	No	No	Yes
HoboCop	No	No	Yes (Beta)	No
Hoppy	No	Yes	Yes	Yes
Houngan	No	No	Yes	Yes
Ice	No	Yes	No	No
Ickybod Clay	Yes	No	Yes	Yes
Jack	No	Yes	No	No
Kangoo	No	Yes	No	No
Kungpow	No	No	Yes	Yes
Lady Liberty	No	No	No	Yes
Lockjaw Pooch	No	No	No	Yes
Lucy	No	Yes (Beta)	No	No
N. Boss	Yes	No	No	No
Nana Man	No	Yes	No	No
Octohead	No	Yes	No	No
Sarge	No	Yes	No	No
Slyck	No	Yes	No	No
Spike	No	Yes	No	No
Sumo Santa	No	No	Yes	Yes
Taffy	Yes	No	Yes	Yes
Thunder	No	Yes	No	No
Tiny	Yes	Yes	No	No
Zappa Yow Yow Boyz	No	No	No	Yes

== Games ==
- ClayFighter (Super NES, Genesis)
- ClayFighter: Tournament Edition (Super NES)
- ClayFighter 2: Judgment Clay (Super NES)
- ClayFighter 63⅓ (Nintendo 64)
- ClayFighter: Sculptor's Cut (Nintendo 64)
- ClayFighter Extreme (PlayStation), cancelled
- ClayFighter: Call of Putty (WiiWare and DSiWare), cancelled
- ClayFighter Remastered (PC), cancelled
