= Sonifi Solutions =

Provider of entertainment technology

SONIFI Solutions
- Formerly: Satellite Movie Company (1980–1991); LodgeNet Entertainment Corporation (1991–2008); LodgeNet Interactive Corporation (2008–2013); SONIFI Solutions (2013–2020)
- Predecessors: The Hotel Networks; On Command; Stay Online
- Founded: 1980 (as the Satellite Movie Company)
- Headquarters: Sioux Falls, South Dakota
- Key people: Ahmad Ouri (CEO) (General Counsel); John Chang (Chief Financial Officer)
- Number of employees: 650
- Website: www.sonifisolutions.com

SONIFI Solutions, Inc. is a provider of guest-facing entertainment technology in hotels and healthcare settings.

The company's corporate headquarters are in Sioux Falls, South Dakota with offices in Los Angeles, California, Mexico, and Canada. SONIFI has over 650 employees. SONIFI's primary customer base is in the United States, but they also deliver services in Canada, Mexico, and over 30 other countries through relationships with local licensees.

== History ==
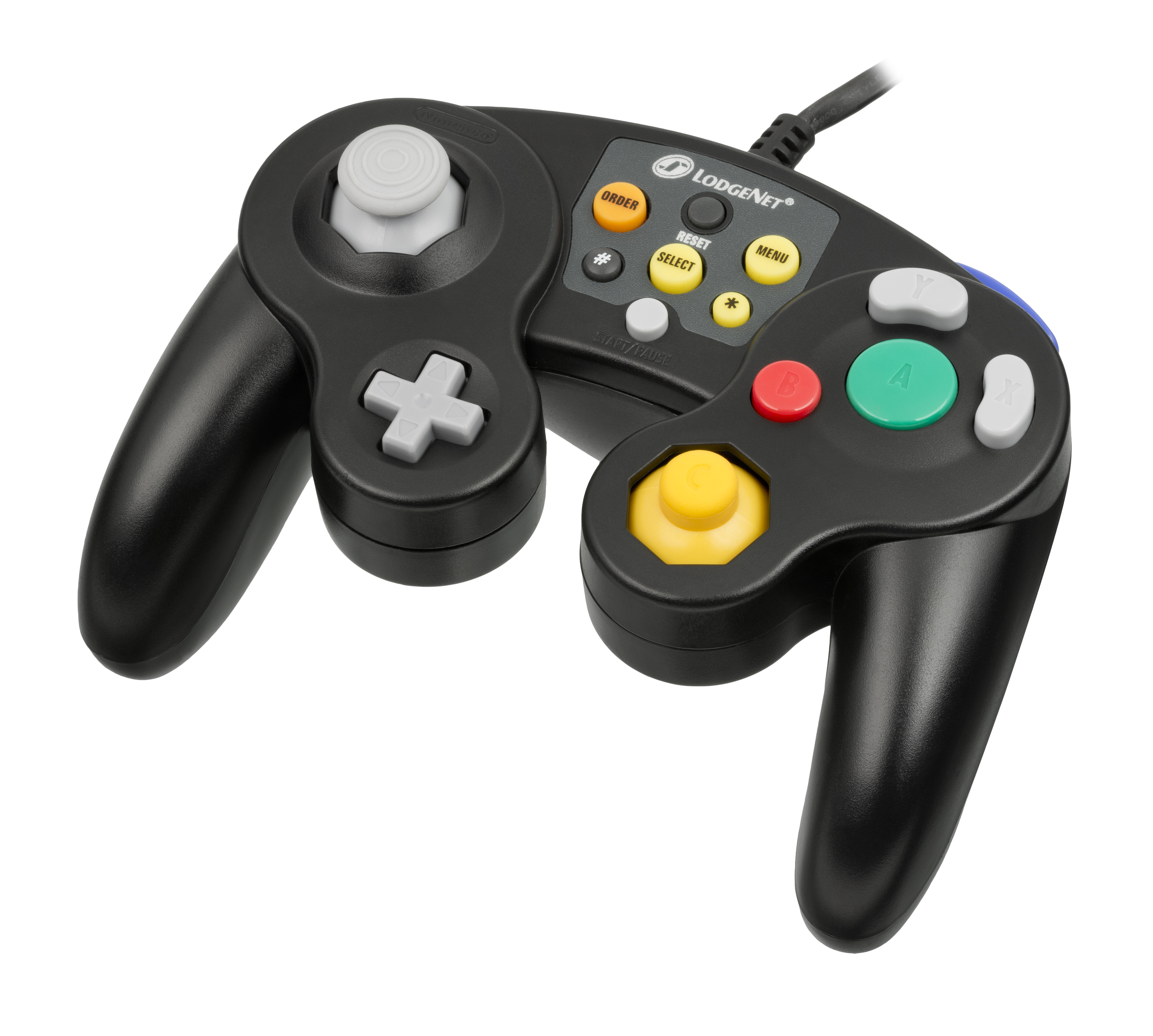
The LodgeNet GameCube controller. Hooked up to TVs in hotel rooms, it allowed guests to pay to play GameCube games for a limited time.

SONIFI Solutions was founded in 1980 as Satellite Movie Company. The company was renamed LodgeNet Entertainment Corporation in 1991 and became a publicly traded corporation in 1993. LodgeNet purchased The Hotel Networks, On Command, and Stay Online corporations in 2006 and 2007, and changed its name to LodgeNet Interactive Corporation in 2008.

As LodgeNet, it provided guest room entertainment services to most major hotel chains and cruise ships by installing and maintaining free televisions and offering video-on-demand entertainment; in return, the hotel and LodgeNet received fees.

In late 1993, LodgeNet launched its on-demand hospitality service, including worldwide delivery of Super NES games to hotel guests via its proprietary building-wide networks. LodgeNet eventually reported the system being installed in 200,000 hotel guest rooms by April 1996, and 530,000 guest rooms by mid-1999. By April 1996, LodgeNet reported that its partnership with Nintendo to deliver Super NES games had yielded 200,000 worldwide hotel guest room installations. On June 16, 1998, Nintendo and LodgeNet entered a 10-year licensing agreement for an "aggressive" upgrade to add Nintendo 64 support to their existing 500,000 Super NES equipped guest room installations. Lodgenet reported that in five years to date, the system had "caused Nintendo to become the most successful new product rollout in the history of the hotel pay-per-view industry". LodgeNet reported that within the middle of 1998 alone, 35 million hotel guests encountered the Nintendo name as an integral amenity, and it reported sales of more than 54 million minutes of Nintendo-based gameplay.

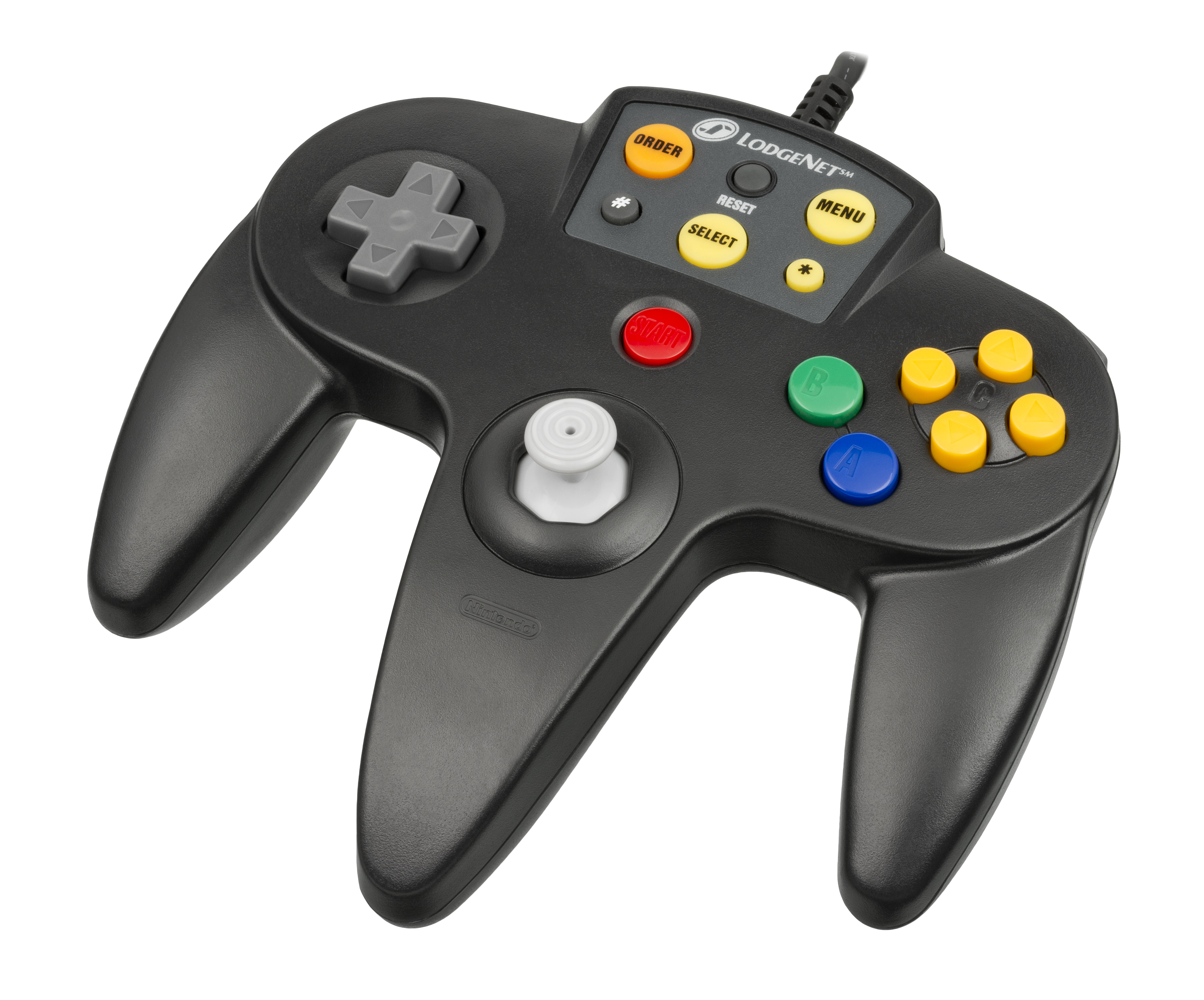
The LodgeNet Nintendo 64 controller Hooked up to TVs in hotel rooms, it allow guests to pay to play Nintendo N64 games for a limited time.

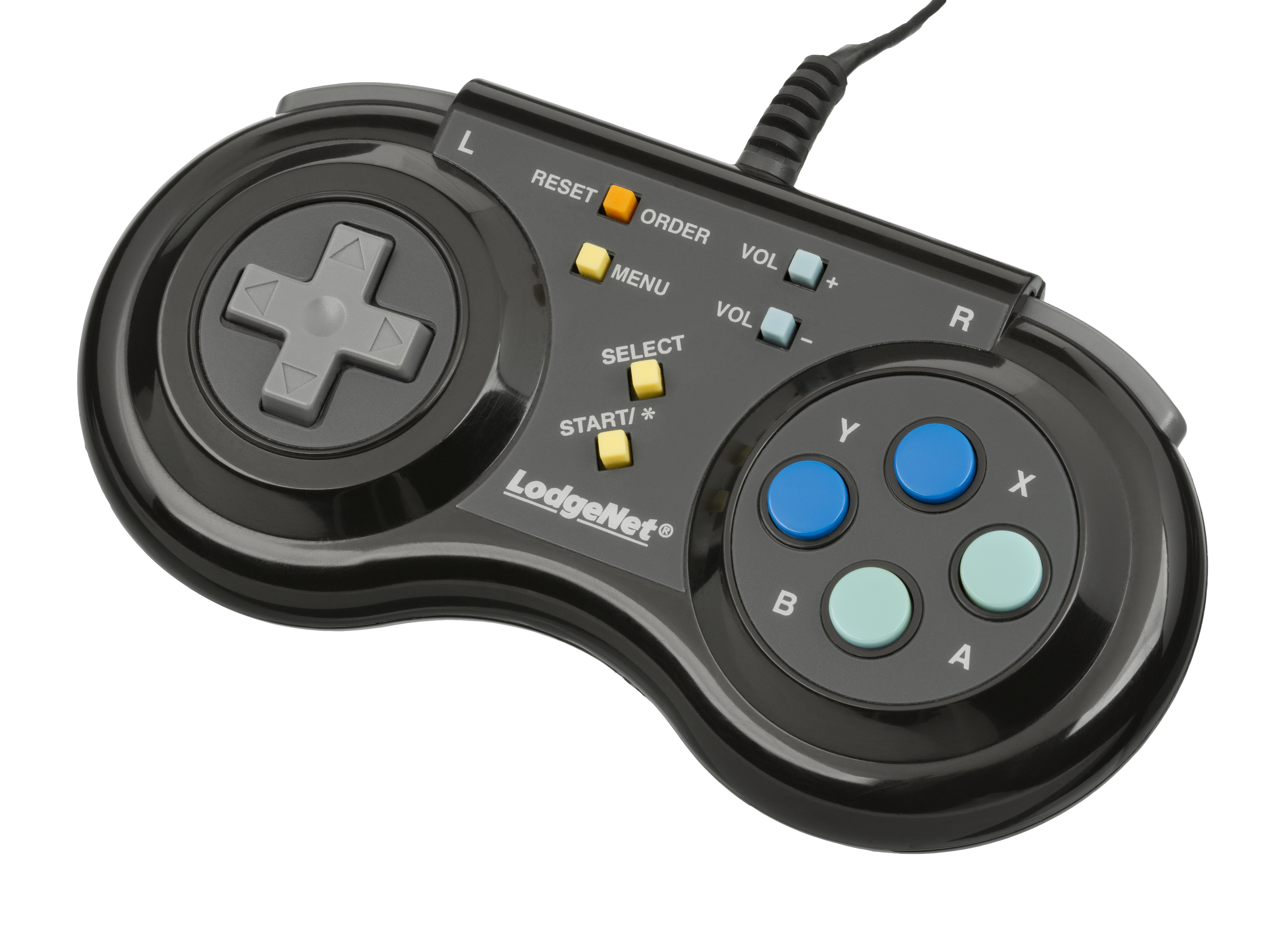
One of the two versions of the Super Nintendo LodgeNet controller.

On June 10, 1999, LodgeNet and Nintendo began expanding and upgrading their existing Super NES buildout to include Nintendo 64 support. In mid-1999, LodgeNet reported that its 530,000 hotel room installations were increasing at a rate of 11,000 rooms per month. In September 2000, Nintendo and LodgeNet began delivering newly released Nintendo 64 games to hotel rooms at more than 1,000 hotel sites, concurrently with the games' retail releases, demonstrating "the capacity to update [LodgeNet's] interactive digital systems with fresh content virtually overnight".

Facing competition from other companies and the rise of streaming services, the number of hotel rooms LodgeNet served globally dropped from 2 million in 2009 to 1.5 million in 2011.

On December 31, 2012, LodgeNet announced its intention to file for a prepackaged Chapter 11 bankruptcy as part of a recapitalization that would give control of the company to Colony Capital, a global investment firm with $38 billion in assets under management and a broad range of hospitality and media industry investments. The commencement of these proceedings was announced on January 28, 2013. During this period the company also announced that Colony had signed a memorandum of understanding with DirecTV under which LodgeNet and DIRECTV would operate as strategic partners within the hospitality and healthcare markets. The agreement extended the parties' current free-to-guest programming agreement to include DIRECTV branding, programming and content, advertising and other operational support.

On March 28, 2013, Colony announced that it had completed the acquisition, concurrent with an approximately $70 million recapitalization of the company and a new $358 million long term credit facility. The investor syndicate led by Colony was issued new common stock representing 100% ownership of the company. This completed the company's emergence from Chapter 11. In the same announcement, hospitality industry veteran Mike Ribero was named the company's new CEO. Tom Storey is the president of hospitality, Ed Kaufman is general counsel, and John Chang is the chief financial officer, completing the current executive management team.

The company officially became SONIFI Solutions on June 25, 2013, with an announcement at the HITEC trade show. In January 2020, its corporate entity became SONIFI Incorporated.

== Games ==
Games were offered for three Nintendo platforms: Super NES, Nintendo 64, and GameCube. Support for the Nintendo Entertainment System was planned, but never released.

== See also ==
- Nintendo 64 controller § LodgeNet variant
- Interactive television
- SpectraVision
- Smart TV
- Nintendo Gateway System
