= Claymates =

1993 video game

- North American cover art
- Developer: Visual Concepts
- Publisher: Interplay Productions
- Producer: Michael Quarles
- Designer: Gregory A. Thomas
- Programmer: Brian Greenstone
- Artist: Colin Silverman
- Composers: Brian Luzietti; Charles Deenen
- Platform: Super Nintendo Entertainment System
- Release: PAL: November 20, 1993; NA: April 26, 1994
- Genre: Platform
- Mode: Single-player

Claymates is a platform video game developed by Visual Concepts and published by Interplay Productions for the Super Nintendo Entertainment System (SNES). It is one of Interplay's clay animation titles which also included the ClayFighter series.

== Plot ==
The protagonist is a boy named Clayton, whose scientist father, Professor Putty, has developed a serum that can transform people into animals when it is combined with clay. Suddenly, Jobo the witch doctor appears and demands the formula for the serum. The professor refuses, to which Jobo replies by changing Clayton into a ball of clay and stealing away both his father and the serum. Clayton vows to save his father despite his new form and embarks on a journey through his backyard, the Pacific, Japan, Africa, and finally outer space.

== Gameplay ==
Gameplay screenshot.

The player uses samples of serum lying around in these levels to transform into one of five different animals (Muckster the Cat, Doh-Doh the Duck, Oozy the Mouse, Goopy the Guppy, and Globmeister the Chipmunk) to best fit with the environment and make it to the end of the level. Special abilities that are in a clay ball transform Clayton into a helpful animals as he races the clock to collect as much as possible and still makes it to the end, jumping over obstacles and attacking with the animal in use. Clayton must also be careful not to be hit while a blob or he'll die.

== Development and release ==
Claymates was developed by Visual Concepts and published by Interplay Productions. Interplay entered into a distribution contract with clay animation studio Cineplay Interactive, a subsidiary of Will Vinton Productions which also included the fighting game ClayFighter and the chess game Battle Chess 4000. Claymates was produced by Interplay veteran Michael Quarles, designed by Gregory A. Thomas of Visual Concepts, and animated by A-OK Animation, the last of which was responsible for mascots such as Gumby and the Pillsbury Doughboy. Thomas conceived Claymates under the working title "Animal Connection" for the Nintendo Entertainment System before production moved to the SNES. Quarles stated the game's clay characters were made in an attempt "to have the consistency of something like Flintstones in character and story" while Thomas claimed was designed to have "the speed of Sonic, the maps of Mario, and colors that have never been done before". For the game's audio, Interplay employed the Advanced Real-time Dynamic Interplay (ARDI) Sound System. This proprietary MIDI tool allowed composers to play music and sound effects directly from SNES ROM files to save on memory by only occupying 18 kilobytes of space.

Characters from Claymates would also appear in the pre-fight introductions of ClayFighter, which was released around the same time. The line "Blaze Processing" featured on the box art and in the manual of Claymates is a reference to Sega's claims of "Blast Processing" in some its US Sega Genesis advertisements. A Genesis version of Claymates was planned but never released. In July 2021, Claymates was added to the Nintendo Classics service.

== Reception ==
Reception

Review scores
| Publication | Score |
|---|---|
| AllGame | 3/5 |
| Computer and Video Games | 77/100 |
| Electronic Gaming Monthly | 7/10 (Note: In Electronic Gaming Monthly's review, three critics scored Claymates 7/10, one 6/10, another 8/10.) |
| GamePro | 4.125/5 (Note: GamePro scored Claymates 4/5 three times for sound, control, and fun factor, and 4.5/5 for graphics.) |
| Hyper | 87% |
| Mega Fun | 69% |
| Nintendo Power | 3.525/5 (Note: Nintendo Power scored Claymates 3.5/5 three times for play control, challenge, and theme/fun, and 3.6/5 for graphics/sound.) |
| Official Nintendo Magazine | 80/100 |
| Super Play | 79% |
| Video Games (DE) | 71% |
| Electronic Games | 90% |
| Nintendo Acción | 83/100 |
| Super Control | 85% |
| Super Gamer | 84/100 |
| Super Pro | 90/100 |

Claymates received mostly positive reviews.
