= ClayFighter (video game) =

1993 video game

- Developers: Visual Concepts (Super NES); Ringler Studios (Genesis)
- Publisher: Interplay Productions
- Producer: Michael Quarles
- Designers: Gregory A. Thomas; Matthew Crysdale; Jason G. Andersen; Jeffrey J. Thomas
- Programmer: Jason G. Andersen
- Artist: Matthew Crysdale
- Composers: Mitchell Stein; Brian Luzietti
- Series: ClayFighter
- Platforms: Super Nintendo Entertainment System, Sega Genesis
- Release: Super NES: NA: November 1993; PAL: May 26, 1994; Tournament Edition: NA: May 1994; Genesis: NA: 1994; PAL: January 1995
- Genre: Fighting
- Modes: Single player, multiplayer

ClayFighter is a fighting game developed by Visual Concepts and published by Interplay Productions. It was released for the Super Nintendo Entertainment System in November 1993 and the Sega Genesis in 1994. The game is a parody of Street Fighter and Mortal Kombat. In 2009, the Genesis version was re-released on the Wii Virtual Console.

Most of the game features a circus theme focused more on humor. It features claymation-style graphics that were created by photographing and digitizing actual clay models. The game was one of the two clay-themed game franchises , the second being a platformer released for the SNES titled Claymates.

In July 2020, Megalopolis Toys made a partnership with Interplay to release a line of 6-inch action figures based on the games.

== Plot ==
A meteor made entirely out of clay crash-lands in the grounds of a humble American circus. The goo from the interstellar object contaminates all of the circus's attractions, transforming them into bizarre caricatures of their former selves, with new superpowers.

== Characters ==
The game features eight playable characters and one boss character:

- Bad Mr. Frosty – A snowman with a bad attitude. His special attacks include throwing snowballs, spitting sharp balls of ice, sliding along the ground and kicking his opponent, and turning into a snow boulder and rolling into his opponent. His arena in 1-player mode is an icy lake in front of an ice block castle with penguin spectators. His taunt consists of his standing with arms akimbo or gesturing while stating "I'm bad, I'm cool, I'm no-one's fool."
- Blob – A blob of clay. A self-proclaimed master of "goojitsu", his specialty is "morphing" into objects to attack his opponent, with his specialty being transforming into a buzzsaw and cutting his opponent in half. He is said to be highly intelligent, despite being made up of the slimy dregs of the mutagenic meteor. His arena is a pool of green slime.
- Blue Suede Goo – An Elvis impersonator with wildly exaggerated features, including a big gut and even bigger hair. He throws musical notes at his opponent and uses his hair as a blade. He fights on the keys of a flaming piano with the words "Big Hunk O' Burnin' Clay" (a parody of the Elvis song "Hunka Hunka Burnin' Love") on it. His name is a parody of the 1950s song "Blue Suede Shoes", a version of which Presley recorded on his debut album.
- Bonker – A cheerfully manic clown whose arsenal includes deadly pies, killer cartwheels, a spraying flower, and the big hammer that gives him his name. He will fight in two funhouses, one resembling a clown head, the other resembling a bubble-spewing rubber duck (although their interiors are the same, save for a palette swap).
- Helga – An obese and heavily breasted opera singer dressed in Viking attire. She is Blue Suede Goo's rival. Helga attacks by hurling herself at her opponents, stabbing them with the horns on her helmet, and by belting a high vocal note for a sonic scream. The first opponent in single player mode, she fights at an open-air opera theatre.
- Ickybod Clay – A scarecrow-like ghost with a pumpkin head. He can teleport and throw balls of ectoplasm at foes. His name is a play on Ichabod Crane from "The Legend of Sleepy Hollow", and his pumpkin-head is based on the Headless Horseman from the same tale. His arena is a haunted house.
- Taffy – A fighting piece of taffy whose attacks mainly involve stretching and twisting his thin but super-flexible body. As a result, Taffy uses some of the longest-reaching moves in the game. He can also twist himself tightly to cause himself to spin at his opponent while his arms flail. In 1-player mode, he will fight in two overflowing taffy factories.
- Tiny – A buff, large-toothed wrestler-type character with a penchant for posing, who does not really rely on wrestling. Instead, he uses his big fists to charge across the screen and punch, as well as rolling himself into a ball and flinging himself at foes. Another opponent with two palette-swapped arenas, he will fight in a wrestling ring or at a coliseum.
- N. Boss – The final boss is an anthropomorphic string of pearls with two eyes (one wide open, one half closed). N. Boss only attacks with projectiles copied from other characters and a grab attack. Unlike the other characters, he does not appear to be made of clay. Further, the announcer does not announce his name at the start of the match or when he wins. N. Boss uses the purple meteor itself as his arena, although it is actually a palette swap of The Blob's stage. In ClayFighter: Tournament Edition, he has his own arena. His name is a play on M. Bison from Street Fighter II and the phrase "end boss".

== Development ==
ClayFighter was developed by the studio Visual Concepts and published by Interplay Productions. Visual Concepts president Greg Thomas stated that the game, consisting of silly, clay characters battling one another, was conceived as a "new" and "funny" alternative to the violent yet popular fighting franchises Street Fighter and Mortal Kombat. The developer took the idea to animation experts Ken Pontac and David Bleiman of Danger Productions, based in Brisbane, California. The two companies worked for nearly one year developing ClayFighter. Once the game's eight fighters were finalized, artists at Danger spent several months molding the characters into various positions with different types of clay. For instance, the thinner character Taffy was constructed with a stronger type of clay than the simpler Blob. Also, some characters required more models than others in order to capture all their movements; artists formed about 70 models just for Blob. The characters were then animated using stop-motion photography. A video camera linked to an Amiga computer running a graphics editor digitized the figures. Designer Jeremy Airey described this portion of development, processing usable and scripting language character animations, as very long and tedious. Interplay also aided in the ClayFighter project by creating new character movements with spliced animation sequences; the publisher was also responsible for recording the musical score, voices, and sound effects. ClayFighter's design was originally made to compete with fighting games such as Mortal Kombat, but without the heavy violence and gore that was becoming controversial. Interplay pushed the game saying that the "parents who object to blood-and-guts games now have an alternative title that gives kids the kind of intense action they want to see in fighting games" to draw sales.

In May 1994, Interplay released ClayFighter: Tournament Edition for the SNES. This version of the game was initially presented as an exclusive rental-only deal with Blockbuster Video in North America. Tournament Edition improved on the original ClayFighter by fixing many glitches, adding a number of stage backgrounds, and offering new difficulty settings, speed options, and versus modes. The Genesis version of ClayFighter was released on the Wii Virtual Console in Europe on February 6 and in North America on May 25, 2009.

A port of ClayFighter for the Atari Jaguar was reportedly in the works by Interplay but it was never released.

== Reception ==
Reception

Aggregate score
Aggregator	Score
GameRankings	49% (GEN)

Review scores
Publication	Score
AllGame	3.5/5 (SNES)
Consoles +	79%
Computer and Video Games	79/100
Electronic Gaming Monthly	7/10, 6/10, 6/10, 6/10, 7/10 (GEN); 8/10, 7/10, 8/10, 7/10 (SNES)
Eurogamer	5/10 (GEN)
IGN	4/10 (GEN)
Mega Fun	47% (GEN); 65% (SNES)
Nintendo Life	4/10 (GEN)
Video Games (DE)	65% (GEN); 75% (SNES)
VideoGames & Computer Entertainment	8/10 (GEN)

ClayFighter was awarded Best Street Fighter Wannabee of 1993 by Electronic Gaming Monthly. They also awarded it Best Sound Effects, as well as awarding it for having the Best Ad.

ClayFighter sold 200,000 copies by 1994.

GamePro gave the Genesis port a generally positive review, praising it as nearly identical to the Super NES original. They remarked of the game itself that "fighting fans with a funny bone will enjoy ClayFighter with its laughable characters, cool combos, and great game play." Electronic Gaming Monthly also praised the Genesis port for carrying over all the content of the Super NES version; however, they remarked that a six-button Genesis controller is needed to fully enjoy the game.

== Sequels ==
ClayFighter was followed by the Tournament Edition update in 1994. Two sequels were also produced: ClayFighter 2: Judgment Clay for the SNES in 1995 and ClayFighter 63⅓ for the Nintendo 64 in 1997. The latter game had its own special edition with ClayFighter: Sculptor's Cut in 1998, which was only available as a rental game at Blockbuster Video stores in North America. The Sculptor's Cut edition included four additional characters (High Five, Lady Liberty, Lockjaw Pooch, and Zappa Yow Yow Boyz) who were cut out of the original release for 63⅓. Many special attacks that the characters used were removed and the combo system was also altered. Sculptor's Cut is widely considered to be the rarest game released for the Nintendo 64, with only 20,000 copies ever produced.

In March 2015, Interplay revealed that a remastered ClayFighter was to be released sometime in 2016 and developed in partnership with Drip Drop Games. The game was to include more than 20 characters and 20 "familiar" environments, unique "Claytalities" and new mechanics like double-jumping, air-dashing, counters, and reversals. The game has since been cancelled, as in 2016 Interplay sold the intellectual rights to ClayFighter and many other titles as well.
