= ClayFighter 63 1/3 =

1997 video game

ClayFighter 63⅓
- North American box art
- Developer: Interplay Productions
- Publisher: Interplay Productions
- Producer: Jeremy Airey
- Designers: Jeremy Airey; Rodney Relosa; Eric Hart
- Composers: Richard Band; Rick Jackson
- Series: ClayFighter
- Platform: Nintendo 64
- Release: ClayFighter 63⅓: NA: October 23, 1997; EU: November 19, 1997; Sculptor's Cut: NA: May 15, 1998
- Genre: Fighting
- Modes: Single-player, multiplayer

ClayFighter 63⅓ is a 1997 fighting game developed and published by Interplay Productions for the Nintendo 64. It is the third installment in the ClayFighter series. The title is a parody of the 64 suffix common in Nintendo 64 games, and a reference to Naked Gun 33 1/3.

Upon release, ClayFighter 63⅓ was negatively received by critics for its gameplay, animation and AI. An updated version, titled ClayFighter: Sculptor's Cut, was released in 1998 as a Blockbuster rental exclusive. Due to its limited distribution, Sculptor's Cut is one of the rarest and most valuable Nintendo 64 games.

== Gameplay ==
Like its predecessors, ClayFighter and ClayFighter 2: Judgment Clay, ClayFighter 63⅓ uses stop motion animation and claymation rather than traditional computer animation, producing a unique visual effect.

The arenas in ClayFighter 63⅓ are distinctive, as most feature multiple rooms. During fights, players can punch or kick their opponents into different rooms, and the fight will continue there. There are 26 different rooms to fight in.

The game parodies other fighting games. It incorporates a 3-level bar for super combos, similar to the Street Fighter Alpha series, and uses parries like in the Street Fighter III series. Many of the super attacks are clear variations of attacks from the Street Fighter series. It also features a combo system similar to Killer Instinct, though it humorously mocks the combo names (e.g., "Itty Bitty Combo" or "Triple Brown Betty Combo"). During battles, players can use various attacks, each with its own strengths and weaknesses.

== Plot ==
The Isle of Klaymodo is home to Bessie, a purple meteor that crashed onto the island. Bessie contains the essential ingredient, Bawk Choy, which Dr. Kiln needs for his world-dominating Mutagen. Klaymodo's chief villains are the devious Dr. Kiln and the local voodoo practitioner, Happy Harry Houngan.

Using a mix of laboratory experiments and voodoo spells, they have created a bizarre group of henchmen to assist in their plan to take over the world. These grotesque goons include Bonker, a clown gone bad, and Ickybod Clay, a mysterious entity from down under.

Dr. Kiln is putting the finishing touches on his top-secret mutagen, code-named "Clayotic Claymorphisis," when Houngan enters the lab. Upon discovering Dr. Kiln's secret formula, chaos ensues. In the commotion, a vial of the mutagen shatters in Dr. Kiln's hand, and it begins to take on a life of its own.

The condition spreads quickly, forcing Dr. Kiln to amputate his own hand. As the severed hand hits the floor, it scurries out of the lab and into the dense jungle of Klaymodo. Houngan immediately rushes out in pursuit of the rogue hand, while Dr. Kiln writhes in agony.

Meanwhile, as Dr. Kiln copes with his new stump, a ship on a three-hour tour capsizes near Rubbage Reef. The ship's passengers are an eclectic group, each with their own goals. Among them is Bad Mister Frosty®, a former villain turned good, and Kung Pow, a wok chef known as Chef Boy R' Clay. Taffyman and Blob complete the castaways of the SS Manure.

== Characters ==
There are twelve characters in ClayFighter 63⅓, six of whom return from previous games in the ClayFighter series. Four characters make their debut in this game, and two are from other game series. The first nine characters are available for play from the start, while the remaining three are hidden and can be unlocked using cheat codes or by completing the game with each character.

All twelve characters from ClayFighter 63⅓ also appear in the updated version of the game, ClayFighter: Sculptor's Cut, which includes four additional characters, bringing the total roster to sixteen.

=== Default characters ===
- Bad Mr. Frosty: The Fighting Snowman

Once again reformed, Bad Mr. Frosty is a grouchy snowman determined to stop Dr. Kiln's sinister plot and reclaim the North Pole from Sumo Santa. Frosty fights by transforming his frozen body in various ways, creating snowballs, ice picks, and other icy weapons. He often attacks while growling the taunt, "Call me Daddy!" Frosty is one of the few characters to appear in every ClayFighter game, though his appearance has significantly changed in each installment. He is a parody of Frosty the Snowman.

- Blob

Blob is an amorphous green blob with a dopey grin, who may not seem like a skilled fighter at first glance. However, Blob is a master of morphing, able to transform his body into various weapons, such as cannons, sledgehammers, and boxing gloves. He also has a taste for living clay and doesn't hesitate to devour a downed opponent for a quick snack. Blob has appeared in all three games in the series. In previous entries, he had a high-pitched voice and a sadistic grin, but in this installment, he is given a Quasimodo-like voice and a dopey expression.

- Bonker

Once a children's entertainer, Bonker went insane years ago and now seeks revenge on anyone who laughed at him. With a perpetual scowl and a somber tone, Bonker's homicidal tendencies contrast sharply with his flamboyant dress and makeup. He attacks with cream pies, mallets, and a portable cannon, making his enemies suffer in creative ways. Bonker returns from the first ClayFighter game but with a completely different design. The original Bonker had a manic grin and a cheerfully goofy voice.

- Earthworm Jim

The mightiest worm in all creation, Earthworm Jim is vacationing on Klaymodo Island when he hears of Dr. Kiln's mad scheme. Never one to allow evil to triumph, Jim springs into action, showcasing the head-whipping, raygun-blasting, and cow-dropping moves his fans adore. Jim is a guest character from his own game series, with Dan Castellaneta reprising his role from the cartoon series. In ClayFighter: Sculptor's Cut, Jim is only playable as a secret character.

- Houngan

Happy Harry Houngan is an evil Jamaican witch doctor and master of voodoo with a sinister set of abilities to aid his quest for world domination through black magic. His primary weapon is a rubber chicken that he has transformed into a zombie. Houngan also wields a juju staff and a wooden tiki mask, which he can use as a bludgeon or even as a snowboard. Some of his attacks summon rotting zombie hands that reach out of the ground to grab his opponent. Upon entering the Battle Stage, Houngan rotates his head around, parodying The Exorcist.

- Ickybod Clay

Ickybod Clay is a withered ghoul with a mushy Jack-o'-lantern for a head. He resides in his own haunted mansion, but his squeaky voice and somewhat geeky personality make him less terrifying than he aspires to be. His attacks include throwing his own head as a weapon, performing a parody of the shoryuken called the "Boo-Hoo Ken," and teleporting. Ickybod appeared in the original ClayFighter but had a more whispery and creepy voice. His name is a parody of Ichabod Crane.

- Kung Pow

Kung Pow resembles a bucktoothed version of Bruce Lee and is a Chinese chef who also excels in martial arts. He wears a white gi and delivers dialogue filled with bland and questionable "oriental" wisdom. Most of his attacks are named after Chinese cuisine (such as Egg foo young and chop suey), and he uses utensils like chopsticks, woks, and meat cleavers as weapons. His name is a reference to Kung Pao chicken.

- T-Hoppy: The Battle Bunny

T-Hoppy is a cyborg rabbit created by Dr. Kiln, who combined the disfigured Hoppy from ClayFighter 2 with mechanical implants to transform him into a living weapon. However, T-Hoppy rebelled against his creator and now fights to destroy Kiln and find peace of mind. Along with his impressive physical strength and cybernetic enhancements, T-Hoppy is also a skilled stage magician. In ClayFighter 2, Hoppy had an Austrian accent, parodying Arnold Schwarzenegger (despite not yet having his implants). The "T" in his name references Schwarzenegger's role as the Terminator; however , in this installment, he is given a generic drill sergeant-style voice to match his new design. Hoppy is the only new character from ClayFighter 2 to return, as all other new characters from that game were removed.

- Taffy

Taffy, a former circus freak and partner of Bonker, is a bizarre creature made entirely out of taffy, granting him extraordinary flexibility and agility. He also uses gumballs as throwing weapons and carries a pair of six-shooters. Taffy frequently mimics Curly Howard of The Three Stooges, especially Moe's iconic line, "Oh, a wise guy, eh?" This vocal resemblance was more pronounced in the original ClayFighter, where Taffy first appeared.

=== Unlockable characters ===
- Boogerman

Boogerman, another hero from previous Interplay games, joins the Clayfighters to save the day and outshine his old rival, Earthworm Jim. Boogerman fights using his signature bodily emissions, including mucus, belches, and explosive flatulence. Additionally, he can summon a barrage of falling toilets to crush his foes.

- Dr. Kilnklein (often referred to as Dr. Kiln)

Dr. Generic Kilnklein is the main villain of the game. After being indirectly responsible for the events of ClayFighter 2 (he is mentioned in the manual but doesn't appear in the game), Dr. Kiln's latest scheme is to transform the entire world into clay, allowing him to mold it as he pleases. His hand, now replaced with a piece of clay, can transform into various weapons such as a propeller, machine gun, chainsaw, jumper cables, and a scalpel. Meanwhile, his lost hand gained sentience and became High Five, a hidden character in Sculptor's Cut. With his opaque eyeglasses, hunched back, and thick Germanic accent, Dr. Kiln embodies the archetype of the mad scientist.

- Sumo Santa

Sumo Santa is an evil doppelgänger of Santa Claus, dressed in little more than a loincloth. Characterized as megalomaniacal and power-hungry, Sumo Santa has conquered the North Pole and now views it as his domain and Frosty the Snowman as his primary opponent. Despite his grotesque obesity, Sumo Santa is surprisingly agile and delights in using his massive bulk to flatten his opponents.

== Development ==
ClayFighter 63⅓ was developed by Interplay Entertainment as part of its ClayFighter series, which originated on the Super NES. Initially titled ClayFighter 3, the project was produced by Jeremy Airey, who had worked on previous titles in the franchise, alongside designers Eric Hart and Rodney Relosa. The development team's goal was to create a legitimate fighting game while humorously parodying popular franchises in the genre, such as Street Fighter, Mortal Kombat, and Killer Instinct. Airey explained that the team aimed to replace the extreme violence of those games with gross or humorous actions: "Buckets of blood and gore get boring after a while. We want to make a game that stays fresh [...] We think this sort of thing works better than gore because each character has something unique and funny to show".

Dissatisfied with the clay animation in ClayFighter 2, Interplay reached out to Danger Productions for the new game's character models and stop motion animation, as they had done with the original ClayFighter. Once Interplay's artists had sketched out the game's characters, Danger Productions transformed the illustrations into maquettes for plastic molds, which were then crafted into models using clay, foam, and wire. Interplay directed Danger Productions to film the models in various positions using stop motion photography with backlighting. Interplay then digitized the photographs and integrated the animation, sound, and player input using computer scripting tools. These tools had been created during the short production of ClayFighter 2 but were not fully refined until work began on this third entry in the series.

Newer technology enabled Interplay to achieve the aesthetic they had originally envisioned for the ClayFighter series. Development initially began for the 3DO M2 but later transitioned to the Nintendo 64. Airey and the development team found the N64's software development kit much easier to work with compared to the M2, although Airey expressed regret that the N64 lacked a CD-ROM drive. The N64 allowed the team to render characters within 3D environments while maintaining 24-bit color depth. Airey also mentioned that the team implemented "Spillits" (bits of clay that scatter in 3D space, akin to blood or impact stars in other games) when characters are hit.

For the game's audio, Interplay brought in a sound director from Disney to record the character voice-overs, with a cast that included Rob Paulsen, Frank Welker, and Dan Castellaneta, among others. The team recorded 30 to 40 unique voice lines for each character. Additionally, the game features the voice of famous ring announcer Michael Buffer, who provides commentary throughout each round.

== Release ==
ClayFighter 63⅓ was initially announced in the fall of 1995 as a launch game for the anticipated M2 console. By mid-1996, the game remained a key title in the prospective M2 library. However, during the third quarter of the year, following the M2's eventual cancellation, Interplay announced that development had shifted to Sony's PlayStation and Nintendo's N64.

The game resurfaced under the name ClayFighter Extreme in late 1996; it was later retitled ClayFighter 63⅓ in early 1997 for its imminent N64 release.

The planned PlayStation version was ultimately cancelled due to delays in its development. An Interplay representative stated that this version was scrapped because it could not be released simultaneously with ClayFighter 63⅓; the developers wanted to avoid giving PlayStation owners the impression that it was merely a port of the N64 version.

ClayFighter: Sculptor's Cut

ClayFighter 63⅓ faced numerous delays, ultimately releasing nearly a year later than initially planned. The magazine Nintendo Power featured a cover story and an early review of the game in its June 1997 issue, highlighting anticipation for its launch.

Before releasing ClayFighter 63⅓, Interplay made significant adjustments, including altering the combat system, changing many fighters' movesets, and removing five of the original seventeen playable characters from the roster due to space limitations.

The game was quietly released in North America on October 23, 1997, followed by its launch in Europe the following month.

== ClayFighter: Sculptor's Cut ==
Interplay later released an updated version of ClayFighter 63⅓ titled ClayFighter: Sculptor's Cut, which became a rental exclusive at Blockbuster Video in North America on May 15, 1998. Although the game could only be rented, Blockbuster held an online contest that allowed customers to win a copy of the game.

Sculptor's Cut introduced new storylines, simplified menu navigation, adjustments to the combat system, and a new introduction sequence featuring vocal lyrics, along with other minor changes. Most notably, it reinstated four of the five characters that were removed from the original release of ClayFighter 63⅓, in addition to the original twelve fighters. The fifth character, Hobo Cop, was omitted due to Nintendo's disapproval; he was portrayed as a homeless vigilante with a penchant for alcohol consumption.

The four characters exclusive to ClayFighter: Sculptor's Cut are:

- High Five

Dr. Kiln's severed hand, mutated by chemicals and transformed into a sentient being, High Five harbors deep resentment towards his former host. Despite his physical limitations, he is a skilled "hand-to-hand combatant." Interestingly, it remains ambiguous whether High Five is a right or left hand, as the fighters are reversed when they cross sides of the screen during gameplay. In terms of gameplay mechanics, High Five appears somewhat unfinished; he lacks a ducking Brutal Kick, has only one super attack, and no Claytalities.

- Lady Liberty

Transformed by Dr. Kiln into a living clay creature, Lady Liberty, inspired by the Statue of Liberty, turned against her creator and seeks to destroy him. Her primary weapon is her iconic torch, which she can wield as a flamethrower, adding a unique combat dynamic to her character.

- Lockjaw Pooch

Originally marked as killed during the production of the original ClayFighter 63⅓—with a humorous note stating, "This animal was severely injured during the making of this game"—Lockjaw returns to wreak havoc in Sculptor's Cut. As a vicious junkyard dog granted sentience by Dr. Kiln's experiments, Lockjaw uses his powerful fangs effectively in battle, showcasing loyalty and ferocity.

- Zappa Yow Yow Boyz

Comprising three little pygmy brothers who are a nuisance to Houngan, the Zappa Yow Yow Boyz appear short and squat, but they become stronger when they stack onto each other's shoulders. They also summon their pet goat to assist in battle. Notably cannibalistic, the Boyz toss defeated opponents into a boiling kettle for dinner.

== Reception and legacy ==
Reception

Aggregate score
Aggregator	Score
GameRankings	48%

Review scores
Publication	Score
AllGame	2.5/5
CNET Gamecenter	1/5
Electronic Gaming Monthly	6.25/10 (Note: Four critics of Electronic Gaming Monthly gave the original scores of 7.5/10, 5/10, 6/10, and 6.5/10.) (SC) 5.625/10 (Note: Two critics of Electronic Gaming Monthly rated Sculptor's Cut with scores of 5.5/10, while the others gave scores of 5/10 and 6.5/10.)
Game Informer	6.5/10
GameFan	78% (Note: Three critics of GameFan rated the game with scores of 90, 79, and 66.)
GameSpot	3.1/10
IGN	3.7/10
N64 Magazine	24%
Next Generation	2/5
Nintendo Power	(Jun.) 3.8/5 (Nov.) 7.2/10 (SC) 6.6/10
Superjuegos	85/100

ClayFighter 63⅓ received a largely negative critical reception. The game holds an aggregate score of 47.96% on GameRankings, based on 13 reviews. While many reviewers found the game's humor and parody to be effective, they felt that its shortcomings in other areas left it lacking in long-term appeal. Next Generation noted, "What's so likable about Clay Fighter 63 1/3—in fact, about the only thing that's likable—is that it's just so damn silly, and it parodies its targets pretty squarely. Anyone who's played, or even watched someone else play Street Fighter, Mortal Kombat, or Killer Instinct ... will find the characters, their moves, and voice-overs hilarious. ... In the end, most gamers will have a difficult time spending $69.99 on this comic-tragic game. How much do you value a good, albeit short-lived, chuckle?" Critics condemned the game for its sprite-based graphics, derivative mechanics, weak AI, and choppy animation. GamePro summarized: "Slow action, forced humor, fuzzy speech, frustrating combos, cheesy A.I.—the game is practically a laundry list of what not to do without good gameplay." (Note: GamePro rated the game 3.5/5 for graphics and control, 3.0/5 for sound, and 2.0/5 for fun factor.)

Matt Casamassina predicted that ClayFighter 63⅓ would "remain a prominent title in the N64 library for years to come" because the game "is so terrible it sets the standards for bad." In contrast, the editors of Nintendo Power, who reviewed the game in both its unreleased and released forms in June and November 1997, respectively, were much more favorable. Sushi-X also defended the game in Electronic Gaming Monthly, arguing that while it is unenjoyable in a traditional fighting game sense, it makes for a great party game. His three co-reviewers leaned more toward the majority opinion, stating that the game is funny but would eventually become tiresome.

According to Toy Retail Sales Tracking, ClayFighter 63⅓ sold approximately 60,000 copies before Christmas in 1997. The Sculptor's Cut version of the game remains one of the rarest North American N64 games. Released as a Blockbuster rental deal, only 20,000 copies were manufactured. Due to this limited distribution and the poor treatment that games typically received at video rental stores, boxes and instruction manuals are extremely rare, and their value increased significantly in the early 2010s.

In September 2009, Interplay announced plans to update the ClayFighter series for the WiiWare and DSiWare services with a new title, ClayFighter: Call of Putty. Development was being handled by StudioBlack Games, which included Eric Hart, a programmer from the original ClayFighter. The title of this installment parodies Call of Duty, a popular series of first-person shooter games. Nintendo Power revealed that Call of Putty would include all the gameplay, fighters, and modes from ClayFighter: Sculptor's Cut, with an expected release date in late 2010 or early 2011. However, after continuous delays, the game was listed with a TBA release status on Interplay's website.

In 1999, Interplay commented that ClayFighter had "broken a million" in sales on the Nintendo 64, though it was unclear if the Sculptor's Cut edition was included in that figure.
