= Ready 2 Rumble Boxing: Round 2 =

2000 video game

- North American Dreamcast cover art
- Developers: Midway Studios San Diego (DC, PS2); Point of View (PS, N64); Crawfish Interactive (GBA)
- Publisher: Midway
- Director: Mike Merren (GBA)
- Programmers: Dave Wagner; Terry Betram; David Theodore (GBA)
- Artists: Emmanuel Valdez; Alesia Howard; Terry Ford (GBA)
- Composers: Orpheus Hanley; Rockett Music (GBA)
- Platforms: Dreamcast, Nintendo 64, PlayStation, PlayStation 2, Game Boy Advance
- Release: PlayStation 2, Dreamcast: NA: October 24, 2000; EU: November 24, 2000; JP: January 31, 2002 (PS2); Nintendo 64: NA: November 13, 2000; PlayStation: NA: November 14, 2000; EU: December 1, 2000; Game Boy Advance: NA: June 11, 2001; EU: June 22, 2001
- Genre: Sports (boxing)
- Modes: Single-player, multiplayer

Ready 2 Rumble Boxing: Round 2 is a boxing game for the Dreamcast, Nintendo 64, PlayStation, PlayStation 2, and Game Boy Advance (a North American launch title for the latter two systems). It is the sequel to Ready 2 Rumble Boxing.

== Gameplay ==
Gameplay in the game is similar to that of the previous game. The more big hits the player land consecutively, letters that spell out "RUMBLE" appear below the player's side of the screen. Letters also appear when the fighter taunts his opponent. Once the word is formed, powerful combo attacks can be activated that will almost definitely knock the opponent down. This time, however, there are three levels of "RUMBLE", which build up one after the other. If the player successfully lands a combo with his RUMBLE Meter full on the third level (where the letters start smoking), the final blow can launch the opponent clear out of the ring, giving the player an instant victory.

== Development ==
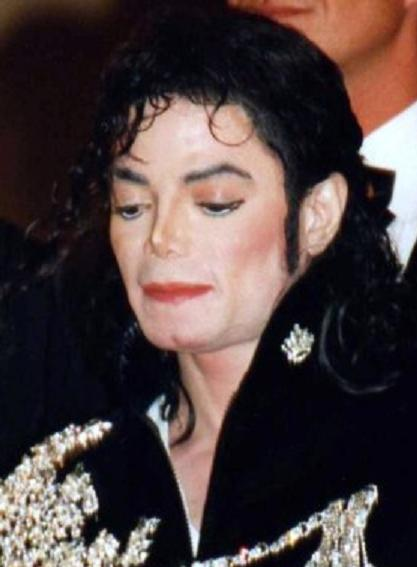
Michael Jackson (picture in 1997) allowed for his likeness to be used for the game.

News from Midway's sequel to Ready 2 Rumble Boxing were first made public back in early summer of 1999 and in May 2000 showed off the game at that year's E3 for demonstration. It was here that Midway announced that the game would receive a PlayStation 2 release. In September 2000 the game was previewed for public demonstrating at that year's ECTS. That same month images and screenshots of two of the game's unlockable characters were unveiled: Shaquille O'Neal and Michael Jackson. It was stated that Jackson was motion captured and digitally photographed for his character, and also lent his own voice to his character, albeit at a lower register than his usual speaking voice. Midway released the PlayStation 2 version on October 24 to coincide with the release of the PlayStation 2 three days later. As with the previous game, ring announcer Michael Buffer appears in the game as himself. The game's roster also features then U.S. President Bill Clinton and his wife Hillary Clinton, credited respectively only as "Mr. President" and "The First Lady".

Due to hardware restrictions, several characters had to be cut from the Nintendo 64 version, namely Freak E. Deke, Wild "Stubby" Corley, Freedom Brock, G.C. Thunder, Robox Rese-4 and Rumbleman.

== Reception ==
Reception

Aggregate score
Aggregator	Score				
Aggregator	Dreamcast	GBA	N64	PS	PS2
Metacritic	70/100	57/100	64/100	68/100	75/100

Review scores
Publication	Score				
Publication	Dreamcast	GBA	N64	PS	PS2
CNET Gamecenter	8/10	N/A	N/A	7/10	7/10
Electronic Gaming Monthly	6/10	6/10	N/A	5/10	7.33/10 (Note: In Electronic Gaming Monthly's review of the PlayStation 2 version, one critic gave it a score of 6/10, and the rest gave it each a score of 8/10.)
EP Daily	N/A	6.5/10	N/A	N/A	7/10
Eurogamer	N/A	3/10	N/A	N/A	N/A
Famitsu	N/A	N/A	N/A	N/A	31/40
Game Informer	7.5/10	4.25/10	N/A	N/A	7.25/10
GameFan	N/A	N/A	N/A	N/A	70%
GameRevolution	B−	N/A	N/A	N/A	B−
GameSpot	7.7/10	7.6/10	6.7/10	7/10	8/10
GameSpy	N/A	51%	N/A	N/A	N/A
IGN	7.7/10	3.5/10	7/10	6/10	6.2/10
Next Generation	N/A	2/5	N/A	N/A	3/5
Nintendo Power	N/A	2.5/5	7.6/10	N/A	N/A
Official U.S. PlayStation Magazine	N/A	N/A	N/A	3/5	4/5
USA Today	N/A	N/A	N/A	N/A	3/4

The game received "mixed or average reviews" on all platforms except the PlayStation 2 version, which received "generally favorable reviews", according to the review aggregation website Metacritic. Greg Orlando of NextGen said in its February 2001 issue that the same PS2 version "fills its spit bucket with last year's saliva." Five issues later, however, the magazine said that the Game Boy Advance version was "still in the ring, but it's out on its feet." In Japan, Famitsu gave the former console version a score of 31 out of 40.

Alan Maddrell of N64 Magazine gave the Nintendo 64 version a score of 76% and said that "we still have the same problems with the game as we had about a year ago. Sluggish response, annoying collision detection and the overriding averageness of it all. Shame." Edge gave the Dreamcast version a score of seven out of ten and called it "an offbeat, unpretentious treat." Jon Thompson of AllGame gave the same Dreamcast version three stars out of five and said it was "definitely a fighter for people who don't need deep gameplay to have a great time. It looks polished and is extremely easy to pick up and play, and something should be said for such a game. However, if you want a fighter with a bit more teeth to it, this title probably isn't for you." However, J.C. Barnes gave the PlayStation version three-and-a-half stars out of five, saying, "Those who bought the previous Ready 2 Rumble and are expecting a completely new experience will be sorely disappointed -- it's simply a basic roster update for the original. Yet gamers who haven't had a chance to play the first game will want to at least rent the sequel for some mindless but fun arcade-style action." Shawn Nicholls later gave the Game Boy Color version three-and-a-half stars and called it "an easy game to enjoy. While it isn't as challenging as more traditional sports titles, it is entertaining and the length of the Championship mode alone makes it a solid investment for any Game Boy Advance owner."

Da bomb mom of GameZone gave the PlayStation 2 version a perfect ten score and said that it was "one of those rare cases where it crosses so many lines of game genres. Whether you are a sports fan or challenge and skill, this is one game that will deliver on all fronts." Later, however, Michael Lafferty gave the Game Boy Advance version 7.5 out of 10 and said that it was "more reflexive than cerebral, but still a lot of fun."

Dan Elekro of GamePro said that the Dreamcast version "isn't a major leap forward from last year's ring rocker, but the championship mode has evolved enough to make it worth considering for a purchase." (Note: GamePro gave the Dreamcast version three 4.5/5 scores for graphics, control, and fun factor, and 4/5 for sound.) Four-Eyed Dragon said of the PlayStation 2 version in one review, "If you're craving a nonheavy, nonstrategic PS2 brawler, Ready 2 Rumble should be your first contender: It contains all the right elements for just having a lot of fun." (Note: GamePro gave the PlayStation 2 version two 5/5 scores for graphics and sound, and two 4.5/5 scores for control and fun factor in one review.) In another GamePro review, Human Tornado called the same PS2 version "a great sequel to what was one of the best Dreamcast games to date. On the PlayStation 2, this arcade boxing game really shines. The wild characters are hilarious, the gameplay is incredibly fun, and the graphics are excellent. Midway scores a KO in Round 2." (Note: GamePro gave the PlayStation 2 version three 5/5 scores for graphics, sound, and fun factor, and 4.5/5 for control in another review.) However, Uncle Dust later said of the Game Boy Advance version, "This mediocre conversion is better than the last Game Boy effort, providing gamers with fairly short-lived button-mashing fun." (Note: GamePro gave the Game Boy Advance version two 3.5/5 scores for graphics and fun factor, and two 4/5 scores for sound and control.)

The PlayStation 2 version was a nominee for the "Console Fighting" award at the Academy of Interactive Arts & Sciences' 4th Annual Interactive Achievement Awards, which ultimately was given to Dead or Alive 2.

The Dreamcast version of the game ranked 7th on NPD's list of Top Titles by units during the period from October 29 to November 11, 2000.
