= Ready 2 Rumble Boxing =

1999 video game

- North American Dreamcast cover art
- Developers: Midway Studios San Diego (Note: Ported to Nintendo 64 and PlayStation by Point of View.); Crawfish Interactive (GBC)
- Publisher: Midway
- Director: Mark Nausha (PS1/N64)
- Producers: Kevin Potter (PS1/N64); Dave Brooks (GBC)
- Programmers: Dave Wagner; Terry Betram; Ian McLean; Steven Lashower (PS1); Chris Warner (PS1/N64); Mike Michaels (PS1); Kamran Manoocherhri (N64); Dave Theodore (GBC)
- Artists: Emmanuel Valdez; Alesia Howard; Tina Hou; Ivan Enriquez (PS1/N64); Eddie Rainwater (PS1/N64)
- Composers: Orpheus Hanley; Aubrey Hodges; Rockett Music (GBC)
- Platforms: Dreamcast, PlayStation, Nintendo 64, Game Boy Color
- Release: Dreamcast: NA: September 9, 1999; EU: October 14, 1999; Nintendo 64, PlayStation, Game Boy Color: NA: November 16, 1999; UK: November 19, 1999 (PS); UK: December 10, 1999 (N64); UK: April 7, 2000 (GBC)
- Genre: Sports (boxing)
- Modes: Single-player, multiplayer

Ready 2 Rumble Boxing is a boxing video game developed by Midway Studios San Diego and published by Midway in September 1999 for the Dreamcast. Ports for Nintendo 64 and PlayStation were developed by Point of View and released in November 1999 alongside a separate version for Game Boy Color by Crawfish Interactive.

The game received generally favorable reviews, and was followed by Ready 2 Rumble Boxing: Round 2 (2000) and Ready 2 Rumble: Revolution (2009).

== Gameplay ==
Like Nintendo's Punch-Out!! series, Ready 2 Rumble Boxing features many characters with colorful personalities (i.e. Afro Thunder, Boris "The Bear" Knokimov, etc.); however, unlike the Punch-Out!! series, the game is in 3D, thus allowing for more control over one's character in the ring. Also unlike Punch-Out!!, players can choose whichever boxer they want from a rather large selection of characters.

The game features two principal modes. Arcade Mode allows one or two players to select a boxer and compete in individual bouts, while Championship Mode involves managing a boxing gym and developing fighters through a series of matches. Players earn prize money that can be spent on training activities and equipment, including speed bags, weightlifting and aerobics exercises, to improve their boxers' abilities. Progression through Championship Mode involves advancing through different competitive ranks and challenging opponents for titles.

Throughout the fights in the game, there is a special RUMBLE meter which fills up, one or two letters at a time, until the word "RUMBLE" is spelled at the bottom of the screen. Letters can be obtained by successfully landing hard blows; most such actions will yield one letter, though some particularly strong punches may yield more. Once the meter is full, the player can power himself up, enabling access to a special combo called "Rumble Flurry", activated by pressing a button combination. Each character's "flurry" is unique to them, and consists of a series of punches which does a large amount of damage if landed successfully.

One unique graphic feature of the game is the gradual bruises gained by players as the fight progresses (like hematomas and swellings), present in all fifth-generation versions. While this is not necessarily a new feature to games (it had been implemented before in SNK's 1992 game Art of Fighting), it garnered much appraisal from reviewers, because of the added fun factor this element supplied to the game.

The Game Boy Color version was one of the few games for the system to feature built-in rumble.

The Dreamcast, PlayStation, and Nintendo 64 versions each have an exclusive boxer: these are, respectively, Jimmy Blood, Gino Stiletto, and J.R. Flurry.

Ring announcer Michael Buffer appears in the game as himself.

== Development and release ==
Ready 2 Rumble Boxing was developed for the Dreamcast using PCs equipped with 3dfx graphics cards. According to lead programmer Dave Wagner, the development team separated the game's graphics layer from the rest of the code in order to keep the code portable, while the rendering engine was rewritten and optimized specifically for the Dreamcast.

Wagner found that memory cache misses were relatively costly on the Dreamcast and consequently rewrote the graphics pipeline into small loops designed to make use of memory prefetching. The team also performed back-face removal in software rather than through the Dreamcast's graphics processor in order to reduce the amount of data transferred to the graphics hardware. The game's artists used PowerAnimator 8.1 on Silicon Graphics workstations.

The game was showcased at E3 1999.

Ahead of the game's release, Midway announced a multimillion-dollar United States marketing campaign that was scheduled to begin alongside the Dreamcast's North American launch and continue through the 1999 holiday season. The campaign included television, print, internet and in-store advertising. Michael Buffer, whose trademark catchphrase provided the game's title, appeared in television commercials and was also scheduled to make promotional appearances.

The television campaign included an advertisement produced by MTV's commercial division and directed by Nick Litwinko, who had previously worked on Beavis and Butt-Head. Midway described the commercial as being inspired by Who Framed Roger Rabbit, combining the game's animated characters with live-action performers. Sega also featured Ready 2 Rumble Boxing characters in its own Dreamcast television advertising and included a playable demo of the game with the console.

In the United Kingdom, Ready 2 Rumble Boxing featured prominently in Sega's Dreamcast launch promotions. Former world boxing champions Chris Eubank and Nigel Benn attended launch events in London, with Eubank participating in a Ready 2 Rumble Boxing competition against members of the public.

In Japan, Sega published the Dreamcast version on 13 January 2000 under the title Ready 2 Rumble Boxing: Uchikome Warai no Megaton Punch!! (レディ・トゥ・ランブル・ボクシング 〜打ち込め笑いのメガトンパンチ!!〜). The Japanese release was priced at ¥5,800 and was promoted through extensive coverage in Dreamcast Magazine. Japanese promotional activities included "Afro Project 2000", a campaign centred on the character Afro Thunder that invited readers to submit designs for promotional T-shirts.

== Reception ==
Reception

Aggregate score
Aggregator	Score			
Aggregator	Dreamcast	GBC	N64	PS
GameRankings	84%	64%	78%	76%

Review scores
Publication	Score			
Publication	Dreamcast	GBC	N64	PS
AllGame	4/5	3.5/5	3.5/5	4/5
CNET Gamecenter	9/10	N/A	8/10	8/10
Edge	8/10	N/A	N/A	N/A
Electronic Gaming Monthly	8.75/10 (Note: Three critics of Electronic Gaming Monthly gave the Dreamcast version each a score of 9/10, and one gave it 8/10.)	N/A	7/10	6.5/10
Famitsu	28/40	N/A	N/A	N/A
Game Informer	7.25/10	N/A	6.5/10	6.5/10
GameFan	89% (Note: In GameFan's viewpoint of the Dreamcast version, three critics gave it each a score of 90, 83, and 93.)	N/A	85%	(T.R.) 84% 79% (Note: In GameFan's viewpoint of the PlayStation version, three critics gave it each a score of 78, 79, and 81.)
GameRevolution	B+	N/A	C−	B−
GameSpot	8.7/10	N/A	6.7/10	7.3/10
GameSpy	7.5/10	N/A	N/A	N/A
IGN	9.1/10	6/10	7.8/10	6.5/10
Next Generation	4/5	N/A	3/5	N/A
Nintendo Power	N/A	7.3/10	7.9/10	N/A
Official U.S. PlayStation Magazine	N/A	N/A	N/A	3.5/5

The game received "favorable" reviews on all platforms except the Game Boy Color version, which received "mixed" reviews, according to the review aggregation website GameRankings. Chris Charla of NextGen said of the Dreamcast original in its November 1999 issue, "With fast action, seriously funny character design, and excellent graphics, Midway once again proves it's untouchable when it comes to arcade sports." Two issues later, however, Adam Pavlacka said of the Nintendo 64 version, "After playing the Dreamcast version for months, it is hard for us to accept an inferior version of the game, even if it does play just as well." In Japan, where the Dreamcast version was ported and published by Sega under the name Ready 2 Rumble Boxing: Uchikomewarai no Megaton Punch!! (READY 2 RUMBLE BOXING〜打ち込め笑いのメガトンパンチ!!〜; Ready 2 Rumble Boxing: Crushing Comical Megaton Punch!!) on January 13, 2000, Famitsu gave it a score of 28 out of 40.

Dan Elektro of GamePro said of the Dreamcast original in one review, "With its unique look, awesome two-player matchups, and high replay value, Ready 2 Rumble Boxing makes the hungry young Dreamcast look like a true contender." (Note: GamePro gave the Dreamcast version 4.5/5 for graphics, and three 5/5 scores for sound, control, and fun factor in one review.) In another review, Scary Larry said that the same Dreamcast version was "far and away better than [Punch-Out!! and Super Punch-Out!!], and one of the most fun boxing games you'll ever find. The only flaw you may find is that the game is easy to beat, and once you're done, you're done. Want realism? Buy Knockout Kings. Want something fun and playable? Ready to Rumble [sic] is the king of the ring." (Note: GamePro gave the Dreamcast version two 5/5 scores for graphics and sound, and two 4.5/5 scores for control and fun factor in another review.)

European reception of the Dreamcast version was highly positive. British magazine Computer and Video Games awarded Ready 2 Rumble Boxing five stars out of five, praising its exaggerated presentation, character designs and accessible arcade-style gameplay. French magazine Consoles+ gave the game 94%, particularly praising its graphics, character animation, sound effects and immediate playability. German magazine MAN!AC awarded it 85 out of 100, praising its humorous presentation and arcade-oriented approach.

Italian magazine Console Mania awarded the game 92 out of 100, praising its audiovisual presentation, variety of characters and entertaining gameplay. Spanish magazine Revista Oficial Dreamcast gave it 9 out of 10, praising its distinctive characters, graphical quality, straightforward controls and entertainment value.

Boba Fatt said of the Nintendo 64 version in one review, "It may not be as pretty as its Dreamcast version, but R2RB still rocks the N64 with a one-two audio/visual combination, finishing the job with an outstanding right hook for personality." (Note: GamePro gave the Nintendo 64 version two 4/5 scores for graphics and sound, and two 4.5/5 scores for control and fun factor in one review.) However, iBot said in another review that the same N64 version was "is inferior to the Dreamcast version, maybe more so than it should be. But what's most important is that the raucous gameplay is still there . If you don't have a Dreamcast and don't plan on getting one (shame on you), then definitely jump into the ring with this game. Otherwise you'll be missing out on a brawlin' good time." (Note: GamePro gave the Nintendo 64 version 2.5/5 for graphics, two 3.5/5 scores for sound and control, and 4.5/5 for fun factor in another review.) Mark Green of N64 Magazine gave the Nintendo 64 version 81%, saying, "If you're looking for something to fill the gap between wrestling titles, ''Ready 2 Rumble is just about adequate. But with Knockout Kings 2000 out there, and Smash Bros and Wrestlemania [sic] offering more accomplished knockabout fighting, it's hard to get excited about the game. We'll applaud Midway for creating a fighter with a sense of humour and a real 'personality' – it's just a shame the fighting itself isn't as much fun."

Major Mike's review of the PlayStation version called it "a pick-up-and-play boxing game that's short on learning, long on fun – and it all occurs without messy reality getting in the way." (Note: GamePro gave the PlayStation version 3.5/5 for graphics, 3/5 for sound, and two 4/5 scores for control and fun factor in one review.) The D-Pad Destroyer said of the same console version in another review, "On its own merits, Ready 2 Rumble takes the PSX places it's never been. Unfortunately, the Dreamcast has been there, done that, and burned the bridges behind it. If you've never played the DC version, and you don't think you ever will, this version is really not bad at all. It's just a PlayStation version of a very impressive Dreamcast title, and the PlayStation just isn't quite up to snuff." (Note: GamePro gave the PlayStation version three 4/5 scores for graphics, control, and fun factor, and 4.5/5 for sound in another review.)

The Dreamcast version was a nominee for "Console Fighting Game of the Year" at the AIAS' 3rd Annual Interactive Achievement Awards; it was ultimately given to Soulcalibur. The game did win the "9th Annual GamePro Readers' Choice Awards" for "Best Boxing Game".

== Commercial performance ==
The success of the Dreamcast version led to it becoming one of the few Sega All Stars titles, and was viewed as one of the Dreamcast's most important launch titles in the UK.

The Dreamcast version maintained a presence on the United Kingdom sales charts after launch, ranking thirteenth on Chart-Track's Dreamcast chart for the week ending February 19, 2000.

In a 2025 ranking based on Circana retail tracking data, GameSpot listed Ready 2 Rumble Boxing as the eighth-best-selling Dreamcast game in the United States by both unit sales and dollar revenue.
