= Boogerman: A Pick and Flick Adventure =

1994 video game

- North American Genesis cover art
- Developer: Interplay Productions
- Publisher: Interplay Productions
- Producer: Michael Stragey
- Designers: Christopher Tremmel; Michael Stragey
- Programmer: Michael Stragey
- Artists: Eddie Rainwater; Scott Bieser
- Composers: Genesis/Mega Drive; Matt Furniss; Super NES; Roy Wilkins
- Platforms: Genesis/Mega Drive, Super NES
- Release: Genesis/Mega Drive: NA: November 18, 1994; EU: December 2, 1994; Super NES: NA: December 5, 1995; EU: January 25, 1996
- Genre: Platform
- Mode: Single-player

Boogerman: A Pick and Flick Adventure is a platform video game developed and published by Interplay Productions. It was released for the Sega Genesis in 1994 and on the Super NES in 1995. The Genesis version was also released on the Wii Virtual Console in North America on November 24, 2008, and in Europe on December 12, 2008. The game's lead character also appears as a playable character and the rival of Earthworm Jim in Interplay's ClayFighter 63⅓.

== Plot ==
One dark and stormy evening, the civic-minded Professor Stinkbaum was working in his lab above Takey Dump where he is secretly building a machine called Zap-o-Matic that would save the world from pollution by transporting it to a place he called Dimension X-Crement. That same evening, eccentric millionaire Snotty Ragsdale pays a visit to the lab to investigate this project and find out how such a thing is possible. He is suspicious about the machine's workings. After activating the machine, Ragsdale inhales a cloud of pepper through his nose, causing him to let out a mighty sneeze. The power of the sneeze breaks the machine, opening a portal. Just then, a mysterious giant arm pops out of the portal and takes the machine's main power source: Snotrium 357. In response to this danger, Snotty rushes into the men's room to change into his alter ego, the mighty Boogerman, before jumping into the portal to pursue the arm to learn the reason for the theft it has committed.

== Gameplay ==
The gameplay of Boogerman operates as a simple side-scroller, with burp/fart ammunition, as well as booger ammunition. There are 20+ different levels, as well as a final boss level. Each level consists of a slight puzzle to finish to the end, and to accomplish this it is necessary to defeat foes, unique to each level. Following this boss battle is a "sandbox" playable credit scroll, as the player can "fly-fart" with unlimited fuel (not possible in normal gameplay).

Throughout the game, Boogerman's health is represented by his cape, which changes from red to yellow whenever he takes damage from enemy attacks. If he is hit while his cape is turned yellow, he melts away and loses a life. The player can gather capes to restore Boogerman's health. Also scattered through the levels are huts that activate checkpoints if touched.

== Reception ==
Reception

Aggregate score
Aggregator	Score
GameRankings	69% (SMD); 73% (SNES)

Review scores
Publication	Score
AllGame	3.5/5
Computer and Video Games	85/100 (SMD)
Electronic Gaming Monthly	26/40 (SMD)
Eurogamer	7/10 (WII)
Game Informer	7.5/10 (SNES)
GameFan	277/300 (SMD)
IGN	6/10 (WII)
Jeuxvideo.com	15/20 (SMD)
Nintendo Life	7/10 (WII)
Nintendo Power	14.2/20 (SNES)
Official Nintendo Magazine	86/100 (SNES)
Total!	74/100 (SNES)
Video Games (DE)	81% (SMD & SNES)
VideoGames & Computer Entertainment	9/10 (SMD)
Mega Zone	83% (SMD)
Sega Magazine	87/100 (SMD)

GamePro's Manny LaMancha gave the Genesis version a positive review, summarizing that "As disgusting as Boogerman can be, as a video game it's fun to play. It almost comes off as a parody of last year's Disney's Aladdin, with extensive, challenging levels that take you up and down, left and right, and in and out of distant areas."

Videohead of GamePro said that while the game's gross-out premise is juvenile, the gameplay is high-quality and fun. He added that while the Super NES version is a simple port of the Genesis version, it features more colors, better voice clips, stronger bass sound, and improved controls.

The protagonist of Boogerman: A Pick and Flick Adventure was awarded Grossest Character of 1994 by Electronic Gaming Monthly. The website IGN nominated Boogerman the third worst character name in a 2007 list.

Game Informer gave the game an overall score of 7.5 out of 10 saying that kids will love this game because of the game's simple humor concluding "If you're looking for an action/platform game with a touch of the crass, look no further than Boogerman."

== Development ==
In an interview with Chris Trammel, Trammel stated the following,

“Interplay came to Mike and said “we want to make a gross-out game that appeals to the Garbage Pail Kids demographic…Conceptually we knew we wanted to make a “gross” game. Mike came up with the idea of a gross Superhero and off we went! The ideas just starting pouring out from Michael and myself, I would say we were never short of ideas for characters, locations, etc. As for the design of the characters, we worked very closely with Little Gangster and went through dozens of designs until we finally settled on what you see today. Funny enough, several of the bosses in the game including the main boss BoogerMiester were originally design concepts for Boogerman himself.”

== Legacy ==
On October 16, 2013, Mike Stragey and Chris Tremmel announced that an HD sequel to the game was in the works under their company name Toy Ghost by starting a Kickstarter campaign in which they set a $375,000 goal by November 20 to finish the game for a potential November 2014 release.

On October 24, 2013, Toy Ghost announced that backers who pledged $40 or more would be rewarded with an exclusive co-op mode featuring Earthworm Jim, which would have been the first time since 1997's ClayFighter 63⅓ that they had appeared in a game together.

It only reached a total of $40,252 when it reached its goal date; however, Stragey and Tremmel later sent it to the Steam Greenlight website, and announced on Boogerman's official Facebook page "[They were] waiting to see how things go on Greenlight and hope to try another Kickstarter". However, nothing has been heard since.
