= Ready 2 Rumble: Revolution =

2009 video game

- Developer: AKI Corporation USA
- Publisher: Atari, Inc.
- Platform: Wii
- Release: NA: March 17, 2009; EU: March 20, 2009; AU: March 26, 2009
- Genre: Sports
- Modes: Single player, Multiplayer

Ready 2 Rumble: Revolution is the third and final game in the Ready 2 Rumble Boxing series, released in North America on March 17, 2009, in Europe on March 20, 2009 and in Australia on March 26, 2009. Unlike the previous games developed by Midway, the third iteration was developed by AKI Corporation USA and produced by STEREO MODE under license from The Buffer Partnership. The game is published by Atari, Inc.

== Development ==
In March 2007, the Singapore division of 10tacle Studios acquired the video game rights to "Ready 2 Rumble" from owners The Buffer Partnership, with STEREO MODE as producer and AKI Corporation developing the upcoming title. In December 2008, the game was officially revealed as Ready 2 Rumble: Revolution, with Atari appointed as publisher for a release in Spring 2009 on the Wii.

== Reception ==
Reception

Aggregate scores
Aggregator	Score
GameRankings	39.06%
Metacritic	37/100

Review scores
Publication	Score
Eurogamer	3/10
Game Informer	1/10
GameSpot	3.5/10
GamesTM	4/10
GameZone	2.5/10
IGN	3.5/10
Nintendo Life	4/10
Nintendo Power	5/10
Official Nintendo Magazine	70%
VideoGamer.com	3/10

The game was met with negative reception upon release, as GameRankings gave it a score of 39.06%, while Metacritic gave it 37 out of 100.
