= ClayFighter 2: Judgment Clay =

1995 video game

ClayFIghter 2
- North American cover art
- Developer: Interplay Productions
- Publisher: Interplay Productions
- Producer: Jeremy Airey
- Designers: Jeremy Airey; Rodney Relosa; Eric Hart
- Programmer: Eric Hart
- Artist: Brian Giberson
- Composer: Ken Allen
- Series: ClayFighter
- Platform: Super Nintendo Entertainment System
- Release: NA: January 1, 1995; EU: May 23, 1995
- Genre: Fighting
- Modes: Single-player, multiplayer

ClayFighter 2: Judgment Clay is a 1995 fighting game developed and published by Interplay Productions for the Super Nintendo Entertainment System. It is the sequel to the 1993 game ClayFighter.

== Story ==
ClayFighter 2 revolves around the town of Mudville, where the clay meteor crashed in ClayFighter. Learning of the spectacle that took place in "Clayland", the evil Dr. Generic Kiln (who is only mentioned in the booklet and does not make a visual appearance until ClayFighter 63⅓ in 1997) flies in on his aircraft containing the residue he collected from the meteor and spreads it to the rest of Mudville in order to create more fighters. He declares himself grand master of Mudville after the fall of N. Boss, the end boss of the original ClayFighter. He holds the C-2 tournament to see who can become next grandmaster of Mudville.

== Characters ==
=== Protagonists ===
Bad Mr. Frosty - Frosty, the main character of the original ClayFighter, returns with a new look, wearing a backwards baseball cap instead of a top hat. Just released from prison, where he was incarcerated for beating up Santa Claus, he has been fully rehabilitated, and now fights for the side of good. His arena is the North Pole.

Tiny - Tiny, the champion of the first game, is a musclebound wrestler. He has strong attacks such as the medicine ball. Tiny's ClayFighter sprite was re-used with no changes–both the other returning characters were re-animated for the sequel. His arena is the foyer of a castle, which is suspected to have been originally meant for Ickybod Clay.

Blob - Blob is a mass of clay that can turn into anything he desires. He returns from the original ClayFighter. However, Blob has more forms this time around, and a much busier tongue. Before the match, he is seen morphing into a thumb and pointing it down replying that he is saying "You're goin' down!" His arena is a green, clay-covered city street.

Nana Man - Nana Man is a cool, laid-back banana with a Jamaican accent. He spends his days chilling in the shade and sipping icy-cold drinks. Nana Man has a carefree attitude and is known for saying "Go to the air, mon!" during his rising kick attack. His arena is a jungle temple.

Octohead - Octohead loves to party all the time and is now putting all that energy into winning the tournament. Octohead attacks with acrobatic cartwheels, and a move that resembles a headspin. His arena is the ocean floor.

Googoo - Googoo is a huge baby. He is a bad dude who plays pool, loves women, and chills with his posse in "The Crib". Googoo has a spiked rattle that he uses for almost all of his attacks. He also hurls his bottle at the opponents from a distance. His arena is a street outside of a toy store.

Hoppy - Hoppy the "Battle Bunny" was a normal little rabbit before he got ripped by talking to his muscles. Now that he's all diesel, aside from ravaging his neighbor's garden, Hoppy can mop the floor with the other Clayfighters to become grandmaster of Mudville. Hoppy is a spoof of the title character in the Terminator film series. His arena is a cliffside military camp.

Kangoo - Kangoo is a boxing kangaroo who usually is too nice to her opponents. She hates hurting people, despite being the World Clay Boxing Association champion. Kangoo wanted to retire, but her fans threatened to lynch her if she did; as such, she enters the tournament. She always carries her son into battle with her, who always sits in her pouch. Her arena is a boxing ring.

=== Antagonists (Bosses) ===
Along with the eight default characters in ClayFighter 2, each one has an evil counterpart that can be unlocked. These act as the "final boss" for their counterparts, and for themselves. Although they have the same sprites as their regular counterparts, they have different attacks (normal and special), different fighting stances, different colors, different win quotes, different poses at the start of matches, different mugshots, and different endings, making them play almost like entirely different characters.

Ice - Ice is Frosty's evil twin. Not much has changed about him, except his battle stance is a boxing stance and he wears a brown hat. His body is slightly darker than Frosty's. He believes that he is better than Frosty. He is seen frowning with angered eyes. Ice stole Frosty's Sneaky Punch from the original ClayFighter, although it works a little differently this time. When he wins, he says "I'm bad!" twisting his cap.

Butch - Butch, unlike Tiny, has a suitable name for his appearance. Like Tiny, Butch is big, but dumb as a brick. He will not only punch opponents, but fart at them, too, as a somewhat unconventional projectile attack. His battle stance and skin color are different, too. He is seen moving his lower jaw hanging open. When he wins, he says "Wimp!".

Slyck - Slyck is the evil(er) twin of Blob. His battle stance looks as if he is breathing heavily. His eyes are yellow with green and his teeth are yellow. He is seen glaring with his mouth open with closed teeth. He turns into different objects than Blob, but they fight in a similar manner. When he wins, he glares and says "I'm number one!".

Dr. Peelgood - A spoof of the Mötley Crüe song, "Dr. Feelgood", Peelgood's a laid-back dude, just like Nana. The only difference is his move, Banana Saw, which is like Nana's Banana Slice, except it cuts opponents in two. He is purple with green arms, and his battle stance has a slower pace. He is seen looking around suspiciously while frowning. When he wins, he says "Woot mon!" doing the "V" sign.

Jack - Jack is the opposite of Octohead. Rather than loving company and partying, Jack wishes to be left alone to do pretty much nothing. He wants the whole sea to himself. His stance is different from Octohead's, and he is purple and pale flesh, rather than light purple and white. He is seen moving his lower lip and looking downwards. Jack eschews Octo's fighting style, and attacks very differently, which makes him stand out among the evil characters. He is very direct in attacks, utilizing a charging bite move and a sneaky slide kick. When he wins, he says "Goodnight!" while flipping around.

Spike - Spike is not too different from his counterpart, Googoo, except he wears lavender, has darker skin, and is much meaner. He is seen frowning with his eyes glaring and shining. When he wins, he sucks on his thumb.

Sarge - Sarge, unlike Hoppy, got his muscles from hard military work. Sarge is a loud-mouthed sergeant and, like Hoppy, rides around on his "Thundering Chopper" motorcycle. His battle stance has a faster pace than Hoppy's. He is grey and wears yellow. He is seen growling with his mouth open, but teeth closed. When he wins, he says "I beat ya!" while hopping up and down.

Thunder - Unlike Kangoo, Thunder loves nothing more than beating someone senseless. She loves inflicting pain on all opponents. She is also dark-colored, but still with red gloves. Her joey in her pouch also attacks, unlike Kangoo's joey. She is seen glaring and growling with her mouth open, but teeth closed. When she wins, she laughs along with her child either holding it up or posing with it.

=== Rejected characters ===
Ickybod Clay - The ghoul resident of Clayland was originally planned to be a playable character in the game with his sprites re-used from the first ClayFighter. His stage would be used for Tiny in the final game.

Lucy - Lucy, a gorilla, was originally planned to be a playable character in the game. In the final version, she was replaced by Tiny at the last minute, using recycled sprites from the original ClayFighter.

== Development ==
ClayFighter 2: Judgment Clay was developed in-house at Interplay by many of the same individuals who had worked on the original ClayFighter. The game was produced by Jeremy Airey with scripting, programming and design work by Airey, Rodney Relosa, and Eric Hart. Airey stated that the team scrapped the "primitive" engine used in ClayFighter and ClayFighter: Tournament Edition and developed ClayFighter 2 using a set of programming tools. The development process for the game, including creating the tools, was completed in less than six months from start to finish. For the game's clay animation and stop motion, Interplay contracted a company other than Danger Productions, which had done the first game. Airey was very displeased with the quality of the clay work; in order to prove this to themselves and to test their new tools, the development team used the tools to implement the sprites of the original ClayFighter character Tiny into ClayFighter 2. Airey described Tiny as "best looking character in the game".

ClayFighter 2 was released for the SNES in North America in January 1995 and in Europe the following May. A version of ClayFighter 2 for the Sega 32X was advertised in some North American gaming magazines. However, this version was cancelled. A 3DO Interactive Multiplayer version of ClayFighter 2 was announced to be in development and slated to be published by Interplay during E3 1995, but this version was never released for unknown reasons.

== Reception ==
Reception

Review score
Publication	Score
GameFan	(SNES) 287 / 300

GamePro commented that the game's combo system is improved from the original ClayFighter, but that there are much fewer amusing sound bytes, and the graphics "are less cartoony and more 3D, which should be a plus but isn't. Lots of jagged edged and poorly illustrated backgrounds (especially the boxing ring) combine to make a very dull graphical showing." They concluded the game to be worthwhile for fans of the first game and fighting game enthusiasts, but not for the average gamer.

Entertainment Weekly gave the game a B and wrote, "In video games, as in movies, sequels don't often improve on the originals. As much as the original Clayfighter thumbed its Play-Doh nose at fighting-game conventions — the hurled projectiles, the roundhouse kicks — this sequel buys into those same conventions, making Clayfighter 2: Judgement Clay closer in spirit to Street Fighter II. The backgrounds here are darker and less cartoony, the moves seem much more vicious, and even the addition of goony-looking combatants (including a giant banana) doesn't compensate for the feeling that the original game was much more fun." In 1995, Total! ranked the game 77th on their Top 100 SNES Games stating: "A moderately good beat-‘em-up with the added bonus of being chocka with comedy fighters."
