= SSX (2000 video game) =

2000 video game

- North American box art
- Developer: EA Canada
- Publisher: EA Sports BIG
- Producers: Larry LaPierre; Steve Rechtschaffner
- Programmer: Jon Spencer
- Artist: Ian Lloyd
- Series: SSX
- Platform: PlayStation 2
- Release: NA: October 26, 2000; EU: November 24, 2000
- Genre: Sports (snowboarding)
- Modes: Single-player, multiplayer

SSX is a 2000 snowboarding video game developed by EA Canada and published by Electronic Arts as a launch title for the PlayStation 2. It is the first game in the SSX series, as well as the first title released under the EA Sports BIG publishing label, which specialized in extreme sports titles with an arcade feel.

SSX was a commercial success and received widespread acclaim, being widely regarded by critics as one of the standouts of the PlayStation 2's launch games. It also received numerous industry awards; the Academy of Interactive Arts & Sciences gave the game five awards, including "Console Sports Game of the Year", "Console Racing Game of the Year" and "Console Game of the Year". Subsequent titles in the SSX series include, in order of release, SSX Tricky (2001), SSX 3 (2003), SSX on Tour (2005), SSX Blur (2007), and SSX (2012), the final installment.

The executive producer and creative leader was Steve Rechtschaffner, who was also the inventor of the Olympic snowboard event called boardercross, which served as the inspiration for the game. Rechtschaffner led the development of SSX, SSX Tricky, and SSX 3, before moving into the chief creative officer role for EA Canada; he had no involvement in the other titles in the series.

== Gameplay ==
Players may choose one of a number of riders, each with their own statistics and boarding style. A course is selected, and the player is given the option of racing down the course or participating in a competition to do tricks. There are a total of eight playable characters: Mac Fraser, Moby Jones, Elise Riggs, Kaori Nishidake, Jurgen Angermann, JP Arsenault, Zoe Payne, and Hiro Karamatsu. Mac, Moby, Elise, and Kaori are available at the start, while the other four are unlocked by earning gold medals. Earning the first gold medal unlocks Jurgen, the second gold medal unlocks JP, the third gold medal unlocks Zoe, and the fourth gold medal unlocks Hiro.

Each course is filled with ramps, rails, jumps, and other assorted objects. Performing tricks fills up the player's boost meter, which can be used for additional acceleration, making tricks important even in a race. While some tricks have origins in snowboarding, many of the more advanced tricks are not realistic to actual physics. This matters little in games of this style, as the larger and more extreme tricks count for the most points and are the most spectacular to execute. Players also have the option of practicing or exploring courses in freeride mode.

== Development ==
SSX's development started on the Dreamcast. When Electronic Arts decided to end its relationship with Sega, the development was moved to the PlayStation 2. The game was announced on February 17, 2000, and had an estimated development budget of $8 million.

== Reception ==
Reception

Aggregate score
Aggregator	Score
Metacritic	93/100

Review scores
Publication	Score
AllGame	4.5/5
CNET Gamecenter	9/10
Electronic Gaming Monthly	9/10 (Note: Three critics of Electronic Gaming Monthly gave the game each a score of 9.5/10, 9/10, and 8.5/10.)
Eurogamer	9/10
Famitsu	32/40
Game Informer	9.25/10
GameFan	(G.H.) 94% 88% (Note: In GameFan's review, three critics gave it each a score of 79, 91, and 95.)
GamePro	5/5
GameRevolution	A−
GameSpot	9.4/10
GameSpy	94%
IGN	9.3/10
Next Generation	5/5
Official U.S. PlayStation Magazine	5/5
Maxim	10/10
USA Today	4/4

The game received universal acclaim according to Metacritic, a video game review aggregator. Eric Bratcher of NextGen called it "The best game on PS2 to date. End of story." In Japan, where the game was ported for release under the title X-treme Racing SSX (エクストリーム・レーシングSSX, Exusutorīmu Rēshingu SSX) on October 26, 2000 (the same release date as the North American PlayStation 2 launch), Famitsu gave it a score of 32 out of 40.

GameSpot's early review praised the game's smooth graphics and direct controls, while also drawing attention to the game's dynamic soundtrack, which adjusts the intensity of the background music based on the player's current performance. IGN's review drew attention to the game's deft balancing of tricks and racing, saying that a mastery of both is a requirement of success in the game. The game's tracks were seen as a strong point, calling the Tokyo Megaplex course "a festival of lights, color and one of the most ingeniously designed levels that have ever been in a game." Both reviews mentioned the presence of some graphical slowdown but stated that it was a rare occurrence and only a minor issue. Edge gave it eight out of ten and said of the game: "You'll win races by fractions of seconds, and you'll lose them by less, but either way you'll find yourself tearing down another hillside within minutes. It's addictive and instinctive, and it's that seemingly rare thing: a PlayStation2 [sic] title that values entertainment over image." GameCritics cited the scope of the game's tracks as a strength, and said that there is little revolutionary in the game's overall premise of snowboard races. The pre-wind jump system was also criticised, in that to ensure a good jump, the player must sacrifice the ability to steer long before they reach the ramp. The site praised the simplicity of the trick system, and called the game "an all-around solid title".

=== Accolades ===
The game won the title of the PlayStation 2 Game of the Year at Electronic Gaming Monthly's 2000 Gamers' Choice Awards and Readers' Choice Awards. It also won the "Best Sound" and "Best PlayStation 2 Game" awards at GameSpot's Best and Worst of 2000 Awards; and was a runner-up for "Best Game Music", "Best Graphics, Technical", "Best Sports Game (Alternative)", and overall "Game of the Year" awards. The staff dubbed it a "killer app" for the PlayStation 2.

SSX additionally won the "Console Game of the Year", "Console Racing", "Console Sports", "Gameplay Engineering", and "Visual Engineering" awards at the AIAS' 4th Annual Interactive Achievement Awards; it also received nominations for the "Original Musical Composition" award, which was given to Medal of Honor: Underground, as well as for "Game of the Year", which ultimately was awarded to Diablo II.

The game won the awards for Sports Game of 2000 in Editors' Choice (it was a runner-up in Readers' Choice), Graphics of 2000, Sound of 2000, and PlayStation 2 Game of the Year at IGN's Best of 2000 Awards. It also won the awards for "Game of the Year", "Best Soundtrack", and "Best Extreme Sports Game" at the Official U.S. PlayStation Magazine 2000 Editors' Awards, and was a runner-up for the "Best Multiplayer Game" award, which went to TimeSplitters.

=== Sales ===
According to PC Data, SSX sold 320,000 units in 2000.
