= SSX Out of Bounds =

2005 video game

SSX: Out of Bounds
- Developer(s): EA Sports Big
- Publisher(s): Nokia (N-Gage), Gizmondo Games (Gizmondo)
- Series: SSX
- Platform(s): N-Gage, Gizmondo, Symbian
- Release: N-Gage: EU: January 21, 2005; NA: January 24, 2005; Gizmondo: EU: August 29, 2005; Symbian; 2008
- Genre(s): Snowboarding
- Mode(s): Single-player, multiplayer

SSX Out of Bounds is a snowboarding video game developed by EA Sports Big for the N-Gage and Gizmondo in 2005, and for Symbian in 2008. It is a port of the console installment SSX 3 but downsized for the handheld. The game features multiplayer capability over Bluetooth.

== Reception ==
Reception

Aggregate score
Aggregator	Score
Metacritic	69/100

Review scores
Publication	Score
1Up.com	8.5/10
Consoles +	12/20
GameSpot	6.9/10
GameSpy	2/5 stars
GameZone	7/10
IGN	7.5/10
Pocket Gamer	2.5/5 stars

The N-Gage version received "average" reviews according to the review aggregation website Metacritic.
