= D.I.C.E. Award for Outstanding Achievement in Original Music Composition =

Annual award presented by the Academy of Interactive Arts & Sciences

- Country: United States
- Presented by: Academy of Interactive Arts & Sciences
- First award: 1998
- Currently held by: Ghost of Yōtei
- Website: interactive.org

The D.I.C.E. Award for Outstanding Achievement in Original Music Composition is an award presented annually by the Academy of Interactive Arts & Sciences during the D.I.C.E. Awards. This award is "presented to the individual or team whose work represents the highest level of achievement in original musical composition for an interactive title. Both the quality of the score and the integration of the score into the title will be considered when determining the recipient of the award". Creative/technical Academy members with expertise as an audio designer or musician are qualified to vote for this award.

The award's most recent winner is Ghost of Yōtei, developed by Sucker Punch Productions and published by Sony Interactive Entertainment.

== History ==
The award was initially presented as the Outstanding Achievement in Sound and Music for "the integration and use of sound and/or original music in an interactive title". The first winner was PaRappa the Rapper, which was developed by NanaOn-Sha and published by Sony Computer Entertainment. Sound and Music was separated into their own categories for Outstanding Achievement in Original Music Composition and Outstanding Achievement in Sound Design during the 3rd Annual Interactive Achievement Awards. The award for the Outstanding Achievement in Soundtrack was introduced for the 7th Annual Interactive Achievement Awards. This award recognized "the highest level achievement in soundtrack composition for an interactive title". Both the soundtrack's quality and the soundtrack's integration "into the interactive title will be considered in determining the recipient". The Outstanding Achievement in Soundtrack award was not offered for the 15th Annual Interactive Achievement Awards, and had not been offered since.

- Outstanding Achievement in Sound and Music (1998–1999)
- Outstanding Achievement in Original Music Composition (2000–present)
- Outstanding Achievement in Soundtrack (2004–2011)

Even after the categories for music and sound were split in 2000, several games had won both categories in the same year, which included:

- Medal of Honor: Underground
- Medal of Honor: Frontline
- God of War (2005)
- BioShock
- Uncharted 2: Among Thieves
- Journey
- Destiny
- God of War (2018)
- Ghost of Tsushima
- Returnal
- God of War Ragnarök
- Marvel's Spider-Man 2
- Helldivers 2

== Winners and nominees ==
=== 1990s ===
Table key
Indicates the winner

Year	Game	Developer(s)	Publisher(s)	Ref.
1997/1998 (Note: Presented as Outstanding Achievement in Sound and Music.) (1st)	PaRappa the Rapper	NanaOn-Sha	Sony Computer Entertainment	
1997/1998 (1st)	Fallout	Interplay Productions	Interplay Productions	
1997/1998 (1st)	Interstate '76	Activision	Activision	
1997/1998 (1st)	Oddworld: Abe's Oddysee	Oddworld Inhabitants	GT Interactive	
1997/1998 (1st)	Outlaws	LucasArts	LucasArts	
1997/1998 (1st)	Star Trek: Starfleet Academy	Interplay Productions	Interplay Productions	
1998/1999 (2nd)	Road Rash 3D	Electronic Arts	Electronic Arts	
1998/1999 (2nd)	Grim Fandango	LucasArts	LucasArts	
1998/1999 (2nd)	Heart of Darkness	Amazing Studio	Interplay Productions	
1998/1999 (2nd)	Wild 9	Shiny Entertainment	Interplay Productions	
1999/2000 (3rd)	Um Jammer Lammy	NanaOn-Sha	Sony Computer Entertainment	
1999/2000 (3rd)	Outcast	Appeal	Infogrames	
1999/2000 (3rd)	Silver	Spiral House	Infogrames	

=== 2000s ===
Year	Game	Developer(s)	Publisher(s)	Ref.
2000 (4th)	Medal of Honor: Underground	DreamWorks Interactive	Electronic Arts	
2000 (4th)	Final Fantasy IX	SquareSoft	Square Electronic Arts	
2000 (4th)	Jet Grind Radio	Smilebit	Sega	
2000 (4th)	Escape from Monkey Island	LucasArts	LucasArts	
2000 (4th)	SSX	EA Canada	Electronic Arts	
2001 (5th)	Tropico	PopTop Software	Gathering of Developers	
2001 (5th)	Batman: Vengeance	Ubisoft Montreal	Ubisoft	
2001 (5th)	Harry Potter and the Sorcerer's Stone	KnowWonder	Electronic Arts	
2001 (5th)	Myst III: Exile	Presto Studios	Ubisoft	
2002 (6th)	Medal of Honor: Frontline	EA Los Angeles	Electronic Arts	
2002 (6th)	Metroid Prime	Retro Studios	Nintendo	
2002 (6th)	Rygar: The Legendary Adventure	Tecmo	Tecmo	
2002 (6th)	The Elder Scrolls III: Morrowind	Bethesda Game Studios	Bethesda Softworks	
2002 (6th)	Warcraft III: Reign of Chaos	Blizzard Entertainment	Blizzard Entertainment	
2003 (7th)	Outstanding Achievement in Original Music Composition			
2003 (7th)	Medal of Honor: Rising Sun	EA Los Angeles	Electronic Arts	
2003 (7th)	Beyond Good & Evil	Ubisoft Montpellier	Ubisoft	
2003 (7th)	Call of Duty	Infinity Ward	Activision	
2003 (7th)	Grabbed by the Ghoulies	Rare	Microsoft Game Studios	
2003 (7th)	XIII	Ubisoft Paris	Ubisoft	
2003 (7th)	Outstanding Achievement in Licensed Soundtrack			
2003 (7th)	SSX 3	EA Canada	Electronic Arts	
2003 (7th)	Madden NFL 2004	EA Tiburon	Electronic Arts	
2003 (7th)	NBA Live 2004	EA Canada	Electronic Arts	
2003 (7th)	Tony Hawk's Underground	Neversoft	Activision	
2003 (7th)	True Crime: Streets of LA	Luxoflux	Activision	
2004 (8th)	Outstanding Achievement in Original Music Composition			
2004 (8th)	Fable	Lionhead Studios	Microsoft Game Studios	
2004 (8th)	Katamari Damacy	Namco	Namco	
2004 (8th)	Killzone	Guerrilla Games	Sony Computer Entertainment	
2004 (8th)	NBA Ballers	Midway Games	Midway Games	
2004 (8th)	Rome: Total War	Creative Assembly	Activision	
2004 (8th)	Outstanding Achievement in Soundtrack			
2004 (8th)	Grand Theft Auto: San Andreas	Rockstar North	Rockstar Games	
2004 (8th)	Donkey Konga	Namco	Nintendo	
2004 (8th)	Need for Speed: Underground 2	EA Black Box	Electronic Arts	
2004 (8th)	Tony Hawk's Underground 2	Neversoft	Activision	
2005 (9th)	Outstanding Achievement in Original Music Composition			
2005 (9th)	God of War	Santa Monica Studio	Sony Computer Entertainment	
2005 (9th)	Gun	Neversoft	Activision	
2005 (9th)	Jade Empire	BioWare	Microsoft Game Studios	
2005 (9th)	Kameo: Elements of Power	Rare	Microsoft Game Studios	
2005 (9th)	Rise of the Kasai	BottleRocket Entertainment	Sony Computer Entertainment	
2005 (9th)	Outstanding Achievement in Soundtrack			
2005 (9th)	Guitar Hero	Harmonix	RedOctane	
2005 (9th)	Burnout Revenge	Criterion Games	Electronic Arts	
2005 (9th)	SSX on Tour	EA Canada	Electronic Arts	
2005 (9th)	The Warriors	Rockstar Toronto	Rockstar Games	
2005 (9th)	Wipeout Pure	Studio Liverpool	Sony Computer Entertainment	
2006 (10th)	Outstanding Achievement in Original Music Composition			
2006 (10th)	LocoRoco	Japan Studio	Sony Computer Entertainment	
2006 (10th)	Black	Criterion Games	Electronic Arts	
2006 (10th)	Call of Duty 3	Treyarch	Activision	
2006 (10th)	The Elder Scrolls IV: Oblivion	Bethesda Game Studios	2K Games	
2006 (10th)	Tom Clancy's Splinter Cell: Double Agent	Ubisoft Shanghai, Ubisoft Milan	Ubisoft	
2006 (10th)	Outstanding Achievement in Soundtrack			
2006 (10th)	Guitar Hero II	Harmonix	RedOctane	
2006 (10th)	FIFA 07	EA Canada	Electronic Arts	
2006 (10th)	Marc Ecko's Getting Up: Contents Under Pressure	The Collective	Atari	
2006 (10th)	Scarface: The World Is Yours	Radical Entertainment	Sierra Entertainment	
2006 (10th)	SingStar Rocks!	London Studio	Sony Computer Entertainment	
2007 (11th)	Outstanding Achievement in Original Music Composition			
2007 (11th)	BioShock	2K Boston, 2K Australia	2K Games	
2007 (11th)	God of War II	Santa Monica Studio	Sony Computer Entertainment	
2007 (11th)	Heavenly Sword	Ninja Theory	Sony Computer Entertainment	
2007 (11th)	Lair	Factor 5	Sony Computer Entertainment	
2007 (11th)	Uncharted: Drake's Fortune	Naughty Dog	Sony Computer Entertainment	
2007 (11th)	Outstanding Achievement in Soundtrack			
2007 (11th)	Rock Band	Harmonix	MTV Games	
2007 (11th)	BioShock	2K Boston, 2K Australia	2K Games	
2007 (11th)	Guitar Hero III: Legends of Rock	Neversoft	Activision	
2007 (11th)	SingStar Pop	London Studio	Sony Computer Entertainment	
2007 (11th)	skate.	EA Black Box	Electronic Arts	
2008 (12th)	Outstanding Achievement in Original Music Composition			
2008 (12th)	Metal Gear Solid 4: Guns of the Patriots	Kojima Productions	Konami	
2008 (12th)	De Blob	Blue Tongue Entertainment	THQ	
2008 (12th)	Dead Space	EA Redwood Shores	Electronic Arts	
2008 (12th)	Fable II	Lionhead Studios	Microsoft Game Studios	
2008 (12th)	World of Warcraft: Wrath of the Lich King	Blizzard Entertainment	Blizzard Entertainment	
2008 (12th)	Outstanding Achievement in Soundtrack			
2008 (12th)	Rock Band 2	Harmonix	MTV Games	
2008 (12th)	Guitar Hero World Tour	Neversoft	Activision	
2008 (12th)	LittleBigPlanet	Media Molecule	Sony Computer Entertainment	
2008 (12th)	MotorStorm: Pacific Rift	Evolution Studios	Sony Computer Entertainment	
2008 (12th)	SingStar PS3 Vol. 1	London Studio	Sony Computer Entertainment	
2009 (13th)	Outstanding Achievement in Original Music Composition			
2009 (13th)	Uncharted 2: Among Thieves	Naughty Dog	Sony Computer Entertainment	
2009 (13th)	Assassin's Creed II	Ubisoft Montreal	Ubisoft	
2009 (13th)	Batman: Arkham Asylum	Rocksteady Studios	Warner Bros. Interactive Entertainment	
2009 (13th)	Call of Duty: Modern Warfare 2	Infinity Ward	Activision	
2009 (13th)	Flower	Thatgamecompany	Sony Computer Entertainment	
2009 (13th)	Outstanding Achievement in Soundtrack			
2009 (13th)	Brütal Legend	Double Fine Productions	Electronic Arts	
2009 (13th)	DJ Hero	Neversoft	Activision	
2009 (13th)	Skate 2	EA Black Box	Electronic Arts	
2009 (13th)	The Beatles: Rock Band	Harmonix	MTV Games	

=== 2010s ===
Year	Game	Developer(s)	Publisher(s)	Ref.
2010 (14th)	Outstanding Achievement in Original Music Composition			
2010 (14th)	Heavy Rain	Quantic Dream	Sony Computer Entertainment	
2010 (14th)	Assassin's Creed: Brotherhood	Ubisoft Montreal	Ubisoft	
2010 (14th)	Fable III	Lionhead Studios	Microsoft Game Studios	
2010 (14th)	StarCraft II: Wings of Liberty	Blizzard Entertainment	Blizzard Entertainment	
2010 (14th)	World of Warcraft: Cataclysm	Blizzard Entertainment	Blizzard Entertainment	
2010 (14th)	Outstanding Achievement in Soundtrack			
2010 (14th)	Rock Band 3	Harmonix	MTV Games	
2010 (14th)	Dance Central	Harmonix	MTV Games	
2010 (14th)	DJ Hero 2	FreeStyleGames	Activision	
2010 (14th)	Gran Turismo 5	Polyphony Digital	Sony Computer Entertainment	
2011 (15th)	Portal 2	Valve	Valve	
2011 (15th)	Infamous 2	Sucker Punch Productions	Sony Computer Entertainment	
2011 (15th)	L.A. Noire	Team Bondi	Rockstar Games	
2011 (15th)	LittleBigPlanet 2	Media Molecule	Sony Computer Entertainment	
2011 (15th)	Uncharted 3: Drake's Deception	Naughty Dog	Sony Computer Entertainment	
2012 (16th)	Journey	Thatgamecompany	Sony Computer Entertainment	
2012 (16th)	Diablo III	Blizzard Entertainment	Blizzard Entertainment	
2012 (16th)	Far Cry 3	Ubisoft Montreal	Ubisoft	
2012 (16th)	Mass Effect 3	BioWare	Electronic Arts	
2012 (16th)	World of Warcraft: Mists of Pandaria	Blizzard Entertainment	Blizzard Entertainment	
2013 (17th)	BioShock Infinite	Irrational Games	2K Games	
2013 (17th)	Beyond: Two Souls	Quantic Dream	Sony Computer Entertainment	
2013 (17th)	Puppeteer	Japan Studio	Sony Computer Entertainment	
2013 (17th)	Rain	Acquire, Japan Studio	Sony Computer Entertainment	
2013 (17th)	Rayman Legends	Ubisoft Montpellier	Ubisoft	
2014 (18th)	Destiny	Bungie	Activision	
2014 (18th)	Far Cry 4	Ubisoft Montreal	Ubisoft	
2014 (18th)	Lara Croft and the Temple of Osiris	Crystal Dynamics	Square Enix Europe	
2014 (18th)	The Vanishing of Ethan Carter	The Astronauts	The Astronauts	
2014 (18th)	Transistor	Supergiant Games	Supergiant Games	
2015 (19th)	Ori and the Blind Forest	Moon Studios	Microsoft Studios	
2015 (19th)	Batman: Arkham Knight	Rocksteady Studios	Warner Bros. Interactive Entertainment	
2015 (19th)	Everybody's Gone to the Rapture	The Chinese Room, Santa Monica Studio	Sony Computer Entertainment	
2015 (19th)	StarCraft II: Legacy of the Void	Blizzard Entertainment	Blizzard Entertainment	
2015 (19th)	The Witcher 3: Wild Hunt	CD Projekt Red	CD Projekt	
2016 (20th)	Doom	id Software	Bethesda Softworks	
2016 (20th)	Abzû	Giant Squid	505 Games	
2016 (20th)	Battlefield 1	DICE	Electronic Arts	
2016 (20th)	The Last Guardian	Japan Studio, GenDesign	Sony Interactive Entertainment	
2016 (20th)	Titanfall 2	Respawn Entertainment	Electronic Arts	
2017 (21st)	Cuphead	Studio MDHR	Studio MDHR	
2017 (21st)	Call of Duty: WWII	Sledgehammer Games	Activision	
2017 (21st)	Horizon Zero Dawn	Guerrilla Games	Sony Interactive Entertainment	
2017 (21st)	Rime	Tequila Works	Grey Box	
2017 (21st)	Wolfenstein II: The New Colossus	MachineGames	Bethesda Softworks	
2018 (22nd)	God of War	Santa Monica Studio	Sony Interactive Entertainment	
2018 (22nd)	Detroit: Become Human	Quantic Dream	Sony Interactive Entertainment	
2018 (22nd)	Forgotton Anne	ThroughLine Games	Square Enix Collective	
2018 (22nd)	Marvel's Spider-Man	Insomniac Games	Sony Interactive Entertainment	
2018 (22nd)	Tetris Effect	Monstars, Resonair	Enhance Games	
2019 (23rd)	Control	Remedy Entertainment	505 Games	
2019 (23rd)	Arise: A Simple Story	Piccolo Studio	Techland	
2019 (23rd)	Erica	Flavourworks	Sony Interactive Entertainment	
2019 (23rd)	Golem	Highwire Games	Highwire Games	
2019 (23rd)	Mortal Kombat 11	NetherRealm Studios	Warner Bros. Interactive Entertainment	

=== 2020s ===
Year	Game	Developer(s)	Publisher(s)	Ref.
2020 (24th)	Ghost of Tsushima	Sucker Punch Productions	Sony Interactive Entertainment	
2020 (24th)	Carrion	Phobia Game Studio	Devolver Digital	
2020 (24th)	Little Orpheus	The Chinese Room	Sumo Digital	
2020 (24th)	Ori and the Will of the Wisps	Moon Studios	Xbox Game Studios	
2020 (24th)	The Pathless	Giant Squid	Annapurna Interactive	
2021 (25th)	Returnal	Housemarque	Sony Interactive Entertainment	
2021 (25th)	Deathloop	Arkane Studios	Bethesda Softworks	
2021 (25th)	It Takes Two	Hazelight Studios	Electronic Arts	
2021 (25th)	Kena: Bridge of Spirits	Ember Lab	Ember Lab	
2021 (25th)	Psychonauts 2	Double Fine Productions	Xbox Game Studios	
2022 (26th)	God of War Ragnarök	Santa Monica Studio	Sony Interactive Entertainment	
2022 (26th)	A Plague Tale: Requiem	Asobo Studio	Focus Entertainment	
2022 (26th)	Horizon Forbidden West	Guerrilla Games	Sony Interactive Entertainment	
2022 (26th)	Metal: Hellsinger	The Outsiders	Funcom	
2022 (26th)	Moss: Book II	Polyarc	Polyarc	
2023 (27th)	Marvel's Spider-Man 2	Insomniac Games	Sony Interactive Entertainment	
2023 (27th)	Alan Wake 2	Remedy Entertainment	Epic Games	
2023 (27th)	Diablo IV	Blizzard Entertainment	Blizzard Entertainment	
2023 (27th)	Planet of Lana	Wishfully Studios	Thunderful Publishing	
2023 (27th)	Star Wars Jedi: Survivor	Respawn Entertainment	Electronic Arts	
2024 (28th)	Helldivers 2	Arrowhead Game Studios	Sony Interactive Entertainment	
2024 (28th)	Astro Bot	Team Asobi	Sony Interactive Entertainment	
2024 (28th)	Monument Valley 3	ustwo	Netflix Games	
2024 (28th)	Senua's Saga: Hellblade II	Ninja Theory	Xbox Game Studios	
2024 (28th)	Star Wars Outlaws	Massive Entertainment	Ubisoft	
2025 (29th)	Ghost of Yōtei	Sucker Punch Productions	Sony Interactive Entertainment	
2025 (29th)	Clair Obscur: Expedition 33	Sandfall Interactive	Kepler Interactive	
2025 (29th)	Herdling	Okomotive	Panic Inc.	
2025 (29th)	Mario Kart World	Nintendo EPD	Nintendo	
2025 (29th)	Sword of the Sea	Giant Squid	Giant Squid	

== Multiple nominations and wins ==
=== Developers and publishers ===
Sony has published the most finalists and winners of this award category. Sony has the longest winning streak of six consecutive years (2021-2026), and it also published the most finalists for Original Music Composition in a single year, with four in 2008. Sony and Electronic Arts are the only publishers to have published back-to-back winners for Original Music Composition. RedOctane and MTV Games have both published back-to-back winners for Soundtrack. Ubisoft has published the most finalists without a winner.

Harmonix has developed the most winners for Soundtrack, and has a four-year winning streak for the award. Electronic Art's former subsidiary EA Los Angeles (Note: EA Los Angeles's first win was when they were called "DreamWorks Interactive".) and Sony's Santa Monica Studio have developed the most winning titles for Original Music Composition. EA Los Angeles is the only developer that has developed back-to-back winners for Original Music Composition. Blizzard Entertainment has developed the most finalists without a win.

Developers
Developer	Nominations	Wins
Harmonix	7	5
Santa Monica Studio	5	3
DreamWorks Interactive/EA Los Angeles	3	3
2K Boston/Irrational Games	3	2
Sucker Punch Productions	3	2
NanaOn-Sha	2	2
EA Canada	5	1
Japan Studio	4	1
Lionhead Studios	3	1
Naughty Dog	3	1
Quantic Dream	3	1
Insomniac Games	2	1
Moon Studios	2	1
Remedy Entertainment	2	1
Thatgamecompany	2	1
Blizzard Entertainment	8	0
Neversoft	6	0
Ubisoft Montreal	5	0
EA Black Box	3	0
Giant Squid	3	0
Guerrilla Games	3	0
LucasArts	3	0
Bethesda Game Studios	2	0
BioWare	2	0
The Chinese Room	2	0
Criterion Games	2	0
Double Fine Productions	2	0
Infinity Ward	2	0
Interplay	2	0
London Studio	2	0
Media Molecule	2	0
Namco	2	0
Ninja Theory	2	0
Rare	2	0
Rocksteady Studios	2	0
Ubisoft Montpellier	2	0

Publishers
Publisher	Nominations	Wins
Sony Computer/Interactive Entertainment	42	14
Electronic Arts	24	6
MTV Games	5	3
Microsoft/Xbox Game Studios	10	2
2K Games	4	2
RedOctane	2	2
Activision	14	1
Bethesda Softworks	4	1
Rockstar Games	3	1
505 Games	2	1
Ubisoft	11	0
Blizzard Entertainment	8	0
Interplay	4	0
LucasArts	3	0
Nintendo	3	0
Warner Bros. Interactive Entertainment	3	0
Infogrames	2	0
Square Enix Europe/Collective	2	0

=== Franchises ===
Call of Duty, God of War, and Warcraft have the most nominations for Original Music Composition. God of War and Medal of Honor have garnered the most wins for Original Music Composition with three each; the only other franchises with multiple wins for Original Music Composition are BioShock, Ghost, and PaRappa the Rapper (Note: Um Jammer Lammy is a follow-up, spin-off of PaRappa the Rapper.) with two each. Medal of Honor is the only franchise with back-to-back wins for Original Music Composition. Despite their record-tying nomination counts, Call of Duty and Warcraft have never won the award for Original Music Composition.

Guitar Hero and Rock Band have the most nominations for Soundtrack, and have back-to-back wins for the category. Rock Band has garnered the most wins in the Soundtrack category. SSX is a finalist for Original Music Composition before the award for Soundtrack has been offered. LittleBigPlanet 2 is a finalist for Original Music Composition after the award for Soundtrack has no longer been offered. BioShock is the only game that is nominated for both Original Music Composition and Soundtrack, winning for the former.

Franchises
Franchises	Nominations	Wins
God of War	4	3
Rock Band	4	3
Medal of Honor	3	3
Guitar Hero (Note: DJ Hero and DJ Hero 2 are spin-offs of Guitar Hero.)	6	2
BioShock	3	2
Ghost	2	2
PaRappa the Rapper	2	2
Fable	3	1
SSX	3	1
Uncharted	3	1
Marvel's Spider-Man	2	1
Ori	2	1
Call of Duty	4	0
Warcraft	4	0
Batman	3	0
SingStar	3	0
Assassin's Creed	2	0
Diablo	2	0
The Elder Scrolls	2	0
Horizon	2	0
LittleBigPlanet	2	0
Skate	2	0
StarCraft	2	0
Star Wars	2	0
Tony Hawk's	2	0
