= Sword of the Sea =

2025 video game

- Developer: Giant Squid
- Publishers: Giant Squid (PS5, WIN); Fictions (NS2, XSXS)
- Director: Matt Nava
- Producer: Patrick Quah
- Designer: Tim Ambrogi Saxon
- Programmers: Derek Cornish; Brian Balamut
- Writer: Steve Lerner
- Composer: Austin Wintory
- Platforms: PlayStation 5; Windows; Nintendo Switch 2; Xbox Series X/S
- Release: PS5, Windows; August 19, 2025; Switch 2, Xbox Series X/S; October 29, 2026
- Genre: Adventure
- Mode: Single-player

Sword of the Sea is a 2025 adventure video game developed and published by Giant Squid. In it, the player assumes control of a character named Wraith, who rides on a "hoversword" to restore life to a barren wasteland. The game released on PlayStation 5 and Windows on August 19, 2025. Versions for Nintendo Switch 2 and Xbox Series X/S released on October 29, 2026 published by Fictions. It received generally positive reviews upon release.

== Gameplay ==
In the game, the player character traverses the world while riding on a "hoversword".

In Sword of the Sea, the player assumes control of a Wraith, who explores an abandoned, desolate world and seeks to bring life back to it. The Wraith explores the world with a hoversword, which combines parts of a snowboard, a skateboard, and a hoverboard into one. As the player explores the world, they will collect Ocean Seeds, which upon collecting, will bring back water to the desert wasteland. Returning the ocean to the world provides new opportunities for surfing, and the returning marine life opens up paths for exploration. The player can find Tetra, and donate them to vendors to unlock hoversword tricks. While the game is about surfing the landscape using the hoversword and keeping momentum, the player will battle large creatures named leviathans at certain points.

== Development ==
Sword of the Sea was developed by Giant Squid, the studio behind Abzû and The Pathless. The game was directed by Matt Nava, who worked as the art director of Journey, a game also set in a desert. Nava decided to return to a desert landscape for Sword of the Sea because he felt he had many ideas that were not used in Journey. As with Journey, Sword of the Sea has no dialogue, and its storytelling relies on its visuals and music. Giant Squid unveiled Sword of the Sea in May 2023, and released on Windows and PlayStation 5 on August 19, 2025.

The gameplay is influenced by snowboarding games such as 1080° Snowboarding, though Sword of the Sea is an exploration-focused game rather than a score-based game. The team drew from their experiences with scuba diving, snowboarding, and surfing while working on Sword of the Sea, reflecting on how these extreme sports foster a "spiritual connection" with nature by mixing both mindfulness and motion together. Nava stated that players must "harness" the waves while surfing, and added that the game focuses on developing the relationship between the player and the environment. Early prototypes of Sword of the Sea included elements commonly found in Sonic the Hedgehog games, such as speed boosts and grind rails, but these were later removed as Nava felt they did not fit the style. Shadow of the Colossus inspired the leviathan encounters.

Austin Wintory, a frequent collaborator of Nava's, composed the music. The soundtrack was created in collaboration with the London Voices Choir and the Phoenix Boys Choir. He described the score by saying, "At the heart of this one was an electronic soundscape enveloping a piano." Werner Herzog was noted as an influence, hearing on a podcast that "he'd use Orthodox monk chanting as underscore were he to make a skating documentary."

== Reception ==
Reception

Aggregate scores
Aggregator	Score
Metacritic	(PC) 82/100 (PS5) 88/100
OpenCritic	96% recommend (Note: Based on 51 reviews)

Review scores
Publication	Score
Eurogamer	5/5
Game Informer	8.5/10
GamesRadar+	4/5
PC Gamer (US)	78/100

Sword of the Sea received "generally favorable" reviews according to review aggregator Metacritic. Fellow review aggregator OpenCritic assessed that the game received "mighty" approval, being recommended by 96% of critics.

Chris Tapsell from Eurogamer compared the game to skateboarding games, though he noticed that the gameplay was forgiving, and remarked that the game was about "feeling good more than being good". He also praised the game for encouraging players to explore, as the game was filled with optional locations. Writing for GamesRadar, Rachel Watts remarked that the gameplay was "simultaneously thrilling and relaxing". She also praised the game's pacing, Wintory's soundtracks, and noted that it had more replay value than Giant Squid's previous games due to its inclusion of gameplay upgrades and collectibles. She wrote that Sword of the Sea combined "the majesty of Journey, the action of The Pathless, and the tranquillity of Abzû" and that its release marked "the end of a four-game odyssey that started in 2012 and has reached a simultaneously exhilarating and meditative crescendo".

PC Gamer's Sean Martin compared the game to Alto's Odyssey and wrote that the game excelled at taking the player from "spectacle to spectacle", though he felt that the game was short and its puzzles were simple. Kyle Hilliard from Game Informer praised the game's movement, calling it "fluid and fast". He further applauded the game's art direction and visuals, though he was felt that the story was not as good as other aspects of the game.

=== Awards ===
Year	Award	Category	Result	Ref.
2025	Golden Joystick Awards	Best Visual Design	Nominated	
2025	Golden Joystick Awards	Best Indie Game - Self Published	Nominated	
2025	Golden Joystick Awards	Best Soundtrack	Nominated	
2025	16th Hollywood Music in Media Awards	Score – Video Game (Console & PC)	Nominated	
2026	15th New York Game Awards	Big Apple Award for Best Game of the Year	Nominated	
2026	15th New York Game Awards	Tin Pan Alley Award for Best Music in a Game	Nominated	
2026	68th Annual Grammy Awards	Best Score Soundtrack for Video Games and Other Interactive Media	Won	
2026	29th Annual D.I.C.E. Awards	Outstanding Achievement in Original Music Composition	Nominated	
2026	24th Game Audio Network Guild Awards	Best Main Theme	Nominated	
2026	24th Game Audio Network Guild Awards	Best Music for an Indie Game	Nominated	
2026	24th Game Audio Network Guild Awards	Best New Original IP Audio	Nominated	
2026	24th Game Audio Network Guild Awards	Best Original Soundtrack Album	Nominated	
2026	24th Game Audio Network Guild Awards	Music of the Year	Nominated	
2026	22nd British Academy Games Awards	Artistic Achievement	Longlisted	
2026	7th Society of Composers & Lyricists Awards	Outstanding Original Score for Interactive Media	Won	
