= SSX on Tour =

2005 video game

- European box art
- Developers: EA Canada; EA Montreal (PSP)
- Publisher: EA Sports BIG
- Series: SSX
- Platforms: GameCube, PlayStation 2, Xbox, PlayStation Portable
- Release: GameCube, PlayStation 2 & Xbox: NA: October 11, 2005; EU: October 21, 2005; PlayStation Portable: NA: October 11, 2005; EU: October 28, 2005
- Genres: Sports, Racing
- Modes: Single-player, multiplayer

SSX on Tour is a 2005 sports video game developed by EA Canada and published by Electronic Arts under the EA Sports BIG label for the GameCube, PlayStation 2, Xbox and PlayStation Portable. It is the fourth title in the SSX series.

The GameCube version features cameos from the Mario series under a collaboration with Nintendo. The game was followed in 2007 by a prequel titled SSX Blur.

== Gameplay ==
The gameplay in SSX on Tour is similar to that in SSX 3, with similar controls and the overall aims of events remaining the same - snowboard down a mountain while gaining points for various tricks that can be performed. After each trick, a player's "boost bar" builds up, and once full enables a player to perform special moves (which have been renamed from "Über Tricks" to "Monster Tricks"). Despite the similarities, numerous changes were made to the structure of races and events themselves. A new mechanic in On Tour compared to previous entries is the addition of skiing alongside snowboarding, though the gameplay of the two is fairly identical. Players can now create their own characters, selecting his/her symbol, makeup, height, clothes and hair, in addition to whether they are a snowboarder or a skier. Once created, their character can compete in official competitions (known as "Events"), or unofficial challenges known as "Shreds". Each completed event or challenge gains their character "Hype", raising their profile and moving them up the SSX charts, with the ultimate goal of reaching number one.

With the focus now on custom-created characters, the original SSX cast is moved into the background slightly, appearing in various Shreds against the player, and available to play as when not on the Tour itself. In addition to seven returning SSX veterans (Elise, Mac, Kaori, Zoe, Psymon, Nate and Allegra), three new characters make an appearance: Tyson, Sid and Skye. In the GameCube version, Mario, Luigi, and Princess Peach appear as playable characters, and the level "Last Call" was renamed to "Nintendo Village", with Mario-themed iconography replacing certain textures in the level. Unlike its predecessor, SSX3, no online play was included on any of the versions of SSX On Tour. The main focus was on improving the single-player story mode, implementing the character-creation system, working on new levels, and implementing skiing.

The PSP version also differs greatly from the main console versions, with limited customization to custom-characters and levels borrowed from SSX 3. It also has omitted the use of bonuses when doing Monster Tricks.

This game is presented in the style of a sketch-book, a new direction for the SSX series. The cover artwork as well as the in-game menus are all shown in sketch formats, simplistic images often on a lined background. The special in game collectibles, displayed as snowflakes in previous SSX games, have been replaced with sketchlike doodles known as "skulvis", which were actually controversial within the team according to art director Rich Curren. "When we looked at the SSX franchise, everything was shiny and slick and felt too 'produced,'" said Curren. "We used drawings that looked like they were produced by a 15-year-old kid – not even 'good' drawings at that. We committed to this concept and it worked."

== Soundtrack ==
Like SSX Tricky and SSX 3, SSX on Tour features a licensed soundtrack, this time with more prominence on rap, punk, rock, and alternative music styles. The focus of punk and rock is a departure from the more electronic hip-hop, breakbeat, and techno focused soundtracks of previous games in the series. According to art director Rich Curren, the goal of this change was to capture "something that was more reflective of snowboard and youth culture at the time: the second coming of rock." He recalled the move was initially met with "a lot of blank stares" but after initial tests proved the music was getting the highest reception of anything in the game, they ran with the new direction.

Tracks used on the menu screens are instrumental versions of the ones used during races. Much like previous entries, the soundtrack dynamically fades out when doing certain actions, such as boosting or getting big air off a jump. In addition, when performing "Monster Tricks" during an event, the music will fade away, to be replaced with the sound of the wind whistling as the player cuts through the air. Upon hitting the ground again, the music cuts back in. The main song used in the intro is Iron Maiden's Run to the Hills.

== Reception ==
Reception

Aggregate score
Aggregator	Score			
Aggregator	GameCube	PS2	PSP	Xbox
Metacritic	80/100	80/100	79/100	81/100

Review scores
Publication	Score			
Publication	GameCube	PS2	PSP	Xbox
Electronic Gaming Monthly	8.33/10	8.33/10	7.5/10	8.33/10
Eurogamer	N/A	8/10	N/A	N/A
Famitsu	33/40 (C+A) 31/40	33/40	31/40	N/A
Game Informer	N/A	8/10	7.75/10	8/10
GamePro	4/5	4/5	N/A	4/5
GameRevolution	B	B	N/A	B
GameSpot	8.6/10	8.7/10	8.4/10	8.7/10
GameSpy	4/5	4.5/5	4/5	4.5/5
GameTrailers	7.7/10	7.7/10	N/A	7.7/10
GameZone	9/10	8.9/10	8.5/10	8.9/10
IGN	8.8/10	8.8/10	8.4/10	8.8/10
Nintendo Power	8/10	N/A	N/A	N/A
Official U.S. PlayStation Magazine	N/A	4/5	3/5	N/A
Official Xbox Magazine (US)	N/A	N/A	N/A	8/10
Detroit Free Press	N/A	3/4	N/A	N/A

The game received "favorable" reviews on all platforms according to video game review aggregator website Metacritic. In Japan, Famitsu gave the GameCube and PS2 versions a score of one nine and three eights, bringing it to a total of 33 out of 40; for the PSP version, the same magazine gave it a score of three eights and one seven, while Famitsu Cube + Advance also gave the GameCube version three eights and one seven, both for a total of 31 out of 40.

=== Awards and nominations ===
Awards

- Alternative Sports Game from IGN
- Best Use of Sound in a Game at DEM X AWARDS 2005
- Sports Game of the Year at 9th Annual Interactive Achievement Awards (AIAS) in 2006.

Nominations

- Best Mobile Game of the Year CAEAA 2006
- Best Individual Sports Game at Spike Video Game Awards 2005
- Best Sports/Extreme Sports title from 1UP.com
- Outstanding Achievement in Soundtrack at 9th Annual Interactive Achievement Awards (AIAS) in 2006.
