= Taxi 3 (video game) =

2003 racing video game

- Developer: Visual Impact
- Publisher: Ubisoft
- Platform: Game Boy Advance
- Release: January 2003
- Genre: Racing
- Mode: Single-player

Taxi 3 is a racing video game developed by Visual Impact and published by Ubisoft for the Game Boy Advance in 2003.

== Gameplay ==
Taxi 3 is based on the movie of the same title, Taxi 3. Players take on the role of Daniel, a taxi driver operating a customized high-performance vehicle. The game tasks players with navigating to assigned checkpoints within a time limit to collect items and passengers, and then delivering them to designated locations.

During races, players must stop at gas stations to refuel their vehicle and can use nitro boosts for temporary acceleration. Players must also avoid collisions with other road traffic, such as motorcycles, cars, and trucks. Each mission is preceded by a map showing the starting and ending points alongside a detailed description of the completion criteria. Players must remember these instructions as they will not be displayed again during the mission, and failing results in restarting from the beginning. Every successful mission rewards the player with a car part or a new device, which can usually be used in the next mission, and a repair garage is also featured. Progression is saved using a four-digit password system.

== Development and release ==
Taxi 3 was developed by Visual Impact using a 3D graphics engine. The engine powering the game is an improved version of the one used in SSX Tricky, and the game also features full-motion video (FMV) clips taken directly from the film.

The game was released in Europe in January 2003 at a retail price of €45.

== Reception ==
Reception

Review scores
Publication	Score
Joypad	6/10
GameBoy Advance	35%
Nintendo, le magazine officiel	2/10
Jeuxvideo.com	10/20
EAGB Advance	3/5

Taxi 3 received negative-to-average reviews upon release.

Joypad noted that the polygonal 3D graphics were surprising and found pleasant driving sensations, though it was disappointed by the few environments and the repetitive challenges. Nintendo, le magazine officiel didn't appreciate the driving and defined the races as boring.

Jeuxvideo.com found the 3D environments impressive and defined the rendering believable when driving the car at high speed, though points could be ruined by choppy animation. EAGB Advance found that the graphics engine does a great job representing urban France and found the game controls responsive, while criticizing, however, the short duration of the game.
