= SSX Blur =

2007 video game

- Developer: EA Montreal
- Publisher: EA Sports BIG
- Director: Éric Plante
- Producer: Alex Hyder
- Designer: Éric Chartrand
- Programmer: Sergei Savchenko
- Artist: David Taylor
- Composer: Junkie XL
- Series: SSX
- Platform: Wii
- Release: NA: February 27, 2007; AU: March 15, 2007; EU: March 16, 2007
- Genres: Snowboarding, Skiing, Racing
- Modes: Single-player, multiplayer

SSX Blur is a snowboarding and skiing video game, published by Electronic Arts under the EA Sports BIG label and developed by EA Montreal for the Wii. It is the fifth installment in the SSX series. The game was released in the United States on February 27, 2007. The soundtrack was created by Tom Holkenborg. It is a prequel to SSX on Tour, putting it in the timeline between SSX 3 and SSX on Tour. It is the last game in the series to have the EA Sports BIG branding, as the final installment of SSX would use the standard EA Sports branding instead.

== Gameplay ==
The gameplay in SSX Blur follows a similar format of the previous SSX titles. Like SSX 3, the player progressively works up through 3 peaks on a mountain, participating in races, trick competitions, and the new slalom event to earn prizes and other unlockable material. Players are able to choose from either the traditional snowboards; or skis, as introduced in SSX on Tour.

The game control uses both the Wii Remote and the Nunchuk controller. Movement, speed, and jumping is controlled through the Nunchuk, while, when in the air, the Wii Remote is used to perform tricks. The Wii Remote is also used for throwing snowballs at targets or foes during a race.

As the player races down the hillside, they can successfully complete tricks to earn points as well as to build up an ever-depleting boost meter. When the boost meter is full, the player is then able to execute special "Ubertricks", which require the player to draw a specific shape in the air, such as a heart or a treble clef. While the player knows some Ubertricks at the start of the game, additional ones can be discovered in career mode by collecting icons for that Ubertrick hidden across the various courses.

== Soundtrack ==
Unlike previous games, this soundtrack only contains one musician, Junkie XL. The music is available online.

== Reception ==
Reception

Aggregate score
Aggregator	Score
Metacritic	74/100

Review scores
Publication	Score
Edge	7/10
Electronic Gaming Monthly	5.5/10
Eurogamer	6/10
Game Informer	8.5/10
GamePro	2.5/5
GameRevolution	C
GameSpot	7.4/10
GameSpy	3.5/5
GameTrailers	8.4/10
GameZone	8.2/10
IGN	8.4/10
Nintendo Power	8.5/10
The Sydney Morning Herald	3/5

The game received "mixed or average reviews" according to video game review aggregator Metacritic.

GameRevolution gave the game a C rating: "Maybe SSX Blur sums up the first Wii generation – a small-scale game with some interesting but awkward new control ideas, showing the difficulty for developers and players alike in adjusting to Nintendo’s new wave. If you want a smooth downhill ride or a few hours to perfect your shredding, go hit the real slopes before global warming melts us all into little puddles of goo. Blur may be a step in the right direction, but it hasn’t gotten past the bunny slopes yet."

Eurogamer gave the game a 6/10: "All of which is a shame, really, because it's clear that these chaps could do a very good Wii snowboarding game from the ground up, given the time and resources. Perhaps that's what EA will try next, and I do hope so, because there's much promise here. In the meantime, SSX Blur is worth a go if you can put up with a few moments of frustration and the feeling of being slightly detached from your achievements, but those in search of a good snowboarding game would do better to stick with the good snowboarding games that EA has already made."
