= Medal of Honor 2 =

Medal of Honor 2 may refer to:

- Medal of Honor: Underground, the 2000 prequel to the 1999 video game Medal of Honor
- Medal of Honor: Warfighter, the 2012 sequel to the 2010 video game reboot Medal of Honor
