= The Pathless =

2020 action-adventure video game

- Developer: Giant Squid
- Publisher: Annapurna Interactive
- Director: Matt Nava
- Producer: Patrick Quah
- Programmers: Derek Cornish; Cosmo Fumo
- Writer: Steven Lerner
- Composer: Austin Wintory
- Engine: Unreal Engine 4
- Platforms: iOS; macOS; PlayStation 4; PlayStation 5; Windows; Nintendo Switch; Xbox One; Xbox Series X/S
- Release: iOS, Mac, PS4, PS5, Windows; November 12, 2020; Switch, Xbox One, Series X/S; February 2, 2023
- Genre: Action-adventure
- Mode: Single-player

The Pathless is an action-adventure video game developed by Giant Squid and published by Annapurna Interactive. Players control a nameless character, referred to as The Hunter, who travels to a mythical island shrouded in a supernatural curse. Instead of relying on traditional objective markers, the game focuses on intuitive exploration, archery-based movement and fluid traversal across forests, plains and ruins. Progress revolves around restoring light to regions controlled by corrupted gods, which culminates in boss encounters that blend chases, aerial movement and archery. The narrative is delivered through environmental storytelling and remnants of a fallen civilisation, keeping dialogue minimal.

The game was released for iOS and macOS via Apple Arcade, PlayStation 4, PlayStation 5 and Windows in November 2020, and was later ported to the Nintendo Switch, Xbox One and Xbox Series X/S in February 2023. The game received generally positive reception from critics, who praised the game’s traversal mechanics, art design and soundtrack, though some argued that its open-world suffered from a repetitive structure.

== Gameplay ==
The player can shoot at targets to maintain stamina.

The Pathless is an action-adventure video game played from a third-person perspective. In the game, the player controls the Hunter, who must find a way to lift the curse on an island. The Hunter is a master archer. She must use her bows and arrows to shoot talismans scattered throughout the world, which will fill the Hunter's dash meter and allow her to swiftly navigate the game's world. She is also accompanied by an eagle companion, which can carry the player while flying. The eagle loses altitude while carrying the Hunter, though it can gain altitude through flapping its wings.

Unlike other open world games, the game does not feature a mini-map. Players need to use "Spirit Vision" in order to find locations of interest. By exploring the game's world and solving puzzles, players would collect crystals which can be used to upgrade the eagle's abilities. Throughout the Hunter's journey, she is hunted by invincible cursed spirits which attempt to separate her from her eagle. Players need to avoid alerting them through stealth.

Players need to return light to the obelisks scattered in the game's world, which weakens the curse spirits, allowing players to defeat them. The game consists largely of puzzles to collect ‘lightstones’ to activate the obelisks, with the puzzles consisting of lighting fires, making trick arrow shots using mirrors and targets, Simon Says games with large bells, platforming to difficult locations, and deactivating statues of the game's antagonist. The eagle can assist in these puzzles by moving targets, mirrors, and weights to change the environment. Some puzzles also provide crystals that help the player upgrade the eagle’s abilities, with these crystals also found scattered randomly throughout the world. Players will lose the crystals they have collected when they are defeated by the cursed spirits, though there is a short time period where they may be recovered before they disappear.

== Plot ==
A dark curse threatens the world, stemming from an ancient island at the end of the sea where the god-spirits, the Tall Ones, reside. The Hunter (Laura Bailey), a master archer, travels to the island to attempt to end the curse. There, the Hunter finds a Spirit Mask that allows her to see the world’s secrets, and takes it for her own, before meeting the creator spirit, Eagle Mother. After the Hunter cleanses Eagle Mother of the curse that is slowly killing her, the Godslayer (Troy Baker), a powerful entity responsible for the curse shrouding the world and corrupting the Tall Ones, attacks and seemingly kills the spirit. He then leaves for the Floating Isle, a massive landmass floating in the sky. The Eagle Mother speaks to the Hunter and bids her to cleanse her four children, the other Tall Ones who have also been cursed by the Godslayer, in order to stop his plan to destroy the world. Eagle Mother then reincarnates into the form of a regular Eagle, who joins the Hunter on her quest.

The Hunter and the Eagle manage to cleanse the first three corrupted spirits: Cernos, the Elk Spirit; Sauro, the Lizard Spirit; and Nimue, the Snake Spirit. Throughout her quest, the Hunter can learn of the Pathfinder, a man who believed that the world the Tall Ones had created and ruled was full of chaos. Thus, he wished to discover the ‘One True Path’ so that all people would have a clear path to salvation. His beliefs created a cult of followers that committed many terrible acts against the people of the island in their zealotry. Eventually, the Pathfinder collected the Mask of Ancients, a mask that allowed him to see “as the Tall Ones see”. However, upon donning the Mask, the Pathfinder realized that the world was truly chaotic and 'pathless' and thus no 'One True Path' existed, and that the only way to create such a path was to destroy the world and create a new one. The Pathfinder acquired the Sun Sword, a weapon unmatched by any other except for its twin the Moon Bow, via the ritual sacrifice of his followers, and became known as the Godslayer.

Upon heading to the mountains to find and cleanse the fourth spirit, the Hunter is attacked by the Godslayer, who realizes that the Eagle is not a normal bird, before leaving again for the Floating Isle to prepare for his ritual ascent to godhood. The Hunter and the Eagle manage to cleanse the fourth and final spirit, Kumo the Bear Spirit, and fly to the Floating Isle, atop which is a barren wasteland populated by a single tower. There, the Godslayer ambushes the Hunter, breaking her bow, and curses the Eagle, transforming her into a massive corrupted spirit that attacks the Hunter. The Hunter manages to avoid the Eagle’s attacks as she crosses the Isle to the tower. There, Cernos, Sauro, Nimue, and Kumo grant her the Moon Bow and send her to the top of the tower to face the Godslayer.

Evenly matched against the Godslayer due to her possession of the Bow, the Hunter manages to weaken the Godslayer and the corrupted Eagle. However, the Godslayer completes his ritual and ascends to godhood, transforming into a massive skeletal monstrosity. Before he can kill her and the Eagle, the Hunter absorbs the Eagle’s corruption into her own body. She is transported to the spirit world, where the Eagle Mother speaks to her about the resolve she has displayed in cleansing the Tall Ones and her connection to the Eagle. The Hunter is reunited with the cleansed form of the Eagle, with the other Tall Ones granting her strength to defeat the Godslayer. The Hunter defeats the Godslayer, explaining to him that if everyone follows one path they will not find salvation, and that a "pathless" world allows everyone to find and make their own way. The Godslayer, unwilling to accept this, is destroyed, finally freeing the land of the curse. The Hunter shares a final moment with the Eagle before sending her to spread the word that the curse is broken and take her place as the Eagle Mother. The Hunter then succumbs to the curse.

If the player has found all fifty-seven lightstones throughout the game and collected the four gifts of the Tall Ones, a post-credits scene shows the Eagle cleansing the Hunter of the curse and reuniting with her.

== Development ==
The Pathless was developed by Giant Squid, the creator of Abzû (2016). According to creative director Matt Nava, The Pathless "is about finding your own way forward". Therefore, the team decided to remove the mini-map feature typically seen in open world maps in order to facilitate exploration. The team put heavy emphasis on creating a movement system that is fast and fluid so as to remove the need of incorporating fast travel points. Unlike other games in which the player will respawn at checkpoints when they lose all their health, The Pathless adopts a system in which the players will lose the crystals they have collected instead. According to Nava, this system helps create tension and stake without breaking the player's immersion, which may be the result of respawning the player character.

The game was announced at The Game Awards 2018. Initially set to be released in 2019, the game was first delayed to early 2020 and then subsequently to late 2020 as the team needed additional time for development. The game was released for iOS and macOS via Apple Arcade, PlayStation 4, PlayStation 5 and Windows via Epic Games Store on November 12, 2020. It was later released for Windows via Steam on November 16, 2021. Originally set to be released for Nintendo Switch, Xbox One and Xbox Series X/S in Q4 2022, it was delayed to February 2, 2023. Skybound Entertainment and iam8bit will publish and distribute the physical retail edition of the game for the Switch.

== Reception ==
Reception

Aggregate scores
Aggregator	Score
Metacritic	PC: 81/100; PS4: 77/100; PS5: 77/100
OpenCritic	78% recommend

Review scores
Publication	Score
Destructoid	7.5/10
Edge	5/10
Game Informer	8/10
GameSpot	7/10
GamesRadar+	4/5
IGN	8/10
Jeuxvideo.com	15/20
PlayStation Official Magazine – UK	8/10
PC Gamer (US)	85/100
VG247	4/5

According to review aggregator Metacritic, The Pathless received "generally favorable reviews" upon release. Fellow review aggregator OpenCritic assessed that the game received strong approval, being recommended by 78% of critics.

Chris Carter of Destructoid praised the dashing mechanic of The Pathless, in which the player would shoot at targets to keep their momentum, writing "It not only looks amazing in practice, but it's fun to keep running and jumping". Carter criticized some parts of the gameplay, feeling that the world and some puzzles were simplistic. He also thought the game could be repetitive at points, "While The Pathless looks great, in some sections I felt like I was going through the motions".

Game Informer's Andrew Reiner liked how the game avoided using a map or defined objectives, saying that the game did a good job visually guiding the player through points of interest. The reviewer disliked the lack of variety of each section of the world, "My biggest complaint about The Pathless is the repetitive structure of each world. Find the Lightstones. Light the towers. Repeat. Repeat. Repeat."

During the 24th Annual D.I.C.E. Awards, the Academy of Interactive Arts & Sciences nominated The Pathless for "Outstanding Achievement in Original Music Composition".
