= Hélène Deschamps Adams =

US intelligence agency member (born 1921)

Hélène Marguerite Deschamps Adams
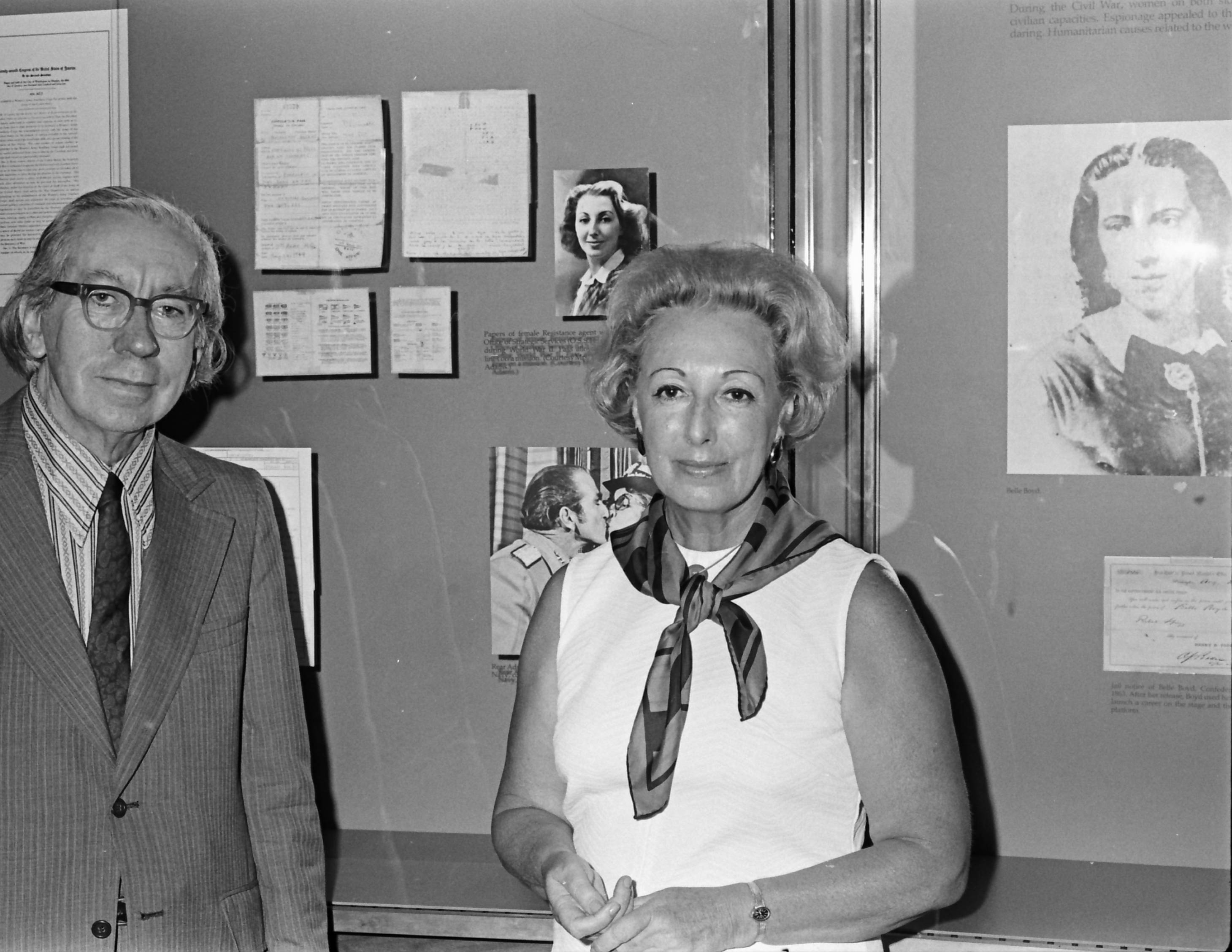
- Adams in 1975
- Born: Helene Marguerite Deschamps; January 30, 1921; Tianjin, China
- Died: September 16, 2006 (aged 85); Manhattan
- Occupation: Author
- Spouse: Forest E. Adams
- Children: 1
- Writing career
- Pen name: Anick, Helene de Champlain
- Period: 20th century
- Genres: Action, adventure
- Subject: Spying
- Notable works: The Secret War of Helene de Champlain (W.H. Allen, 1980); Spyglass: The Autobiography of Helene Deschamps Adams (Henry Holt Co. 1995)
- Literary movement: French Resistance [the Franc Croix and Jacques/Penny Farthing networks], and the OSS, the forerunner of CIA.

Hélène Marguerite Deschamps Adams (30 January 1921 in the French concession in Tianjin, China – 16 September 2006 in Manhattan) was a member of the OSS, a forerunner of the CIA.

== Early life ==
She "was raised in Senegal, Madagascar and Réunion, an island department of France in the Indian Ocean." Her family "returned to France when her father, a general, retired in Aix-en-Provence, in the south of France."

She was studying in a convent when the Nazis invaded France, and as a teenager decided to join the French Resistance. She began as a courier and progressed to more complicated missions behind enemy lines including reporting on airfield locations, German mines and antiaircraft and camouflaged emplacements along the shores of the Mediterranean. She saved American parachutists from capture at drop zones and helped Jewish families escape to Spain. She posed as a secretary at the Milice headquarters in Vichy, where she had access to file cabinets with names of Jews and Resistance fighters marked for execution or deportation to concentration camps, and removed several name cards a day for several months, thus saving many lives.

"Hélène was a very gutsy young woman," Henry Hyde, the chief of American intelligence in France during World War II, said in an interview in "Women in the Resistance" by Margaret L. Rossiter (Praeger, 1985). "She went through the lines for us, observing German defense installations and order of battle," he said. "She took many risks and was a genuinely good operator."

In an interview with CNN in 1996, Mrs. Deschamps Adams said her years of espionage had "no glamour, no romance, no dinner at the embassy in a designer gown." There was only a necessary job, she said. "You have to forget your own feelings.".

"Helene Deschamps joined the Resistance in 1940 and served as a courier and counterespionage agent in southern France. In November 1943 she joined the OSS as a field operative for the network "Jacques," better known as Penny Farthing. Working behind and crossing German lines became a part of her life between 1943 and 1945. The successful invasion of southern France in August 1944 must be in part credited to OSS operatives providing information, sabotage and encouragement to Allied and French patriot forces. For almost five years Helene Deschamps served the Allied cause."

== Time as spy during World War II ==
Following the German occupation of France in 1940, Deschamps fought for the French resistance under the code name "Anick".

She sustained serious injuries for her efforts, including to her back from a beating by an interrogator and partial deafness when a bomb exploded. Nevertheless, when "asked why she took on the dangerous role of secret agent, she was fond of saying, 'I didn't like the idea of Nazis taking over my country.'"

== Personal life ==
She married American first lieutenant, Forest E. Adams, and moved to the United States of America in 1946. She had a daughter with Adams named Karyn Anick Monget.

In 2000, she received The Distinguished Service Medal as well as a citation from former Secretary of Defense, William Cohen, and a citation from the French government as an "ancienne combattante" at a joint ceremony at the French Consulate in Manhattan. She was working on unpublished missions for a third book before her death.

== Death ==
She died of congestive heart failure in Manhattan at age 85.

== Accomplishments and legacy ==
During the war, she "saved American parachutists from capture at drop zones and helped Jewish families escape to Spain." After the war, "she wrote two books, The Secret War, in 1980, and Spyglass: The Autobiography of Helene Deschamps Adams, in 1995. She was honored by the U S and French governments for her deeds....In addition to her books – she was working on a third when she fell ill – Ms. Deschamps Adams was the subject of several TV documentaries on female spies."

For example, The Washington Post reports that Davis Barcalow's documentary film on the OSS's "last shot, after the credits and in a punchy and artsy move, is a short clip of Helene Deschamps Adams, the famous World War II spy, saying: 'You have to think, if you look scared, you're dead. So smile.'"

== In popular culture ==
The video game character Manon Batiste is based on Deschamps Adams, who also served as a consultant for the game Medal of Honor.

== Major publications ==
- The Secret War of Helene de Champlain (1980), ISBN 0-491-02872-5
- Spyglass: The Autobiography of Helene Deschamps Adams (1995), ISBN 0-8050-3536-2
