= Medal of Honor: Underground =

2000 video game

- North American PlayStation cover art
- Developers: DreamWorks Interactive (PlayStation); Rebellion Developments (GBA)
- Publishers: PlayStation; Electronic Arts (Note: Released under the EA Games brand name.); Game Boy Advance: NA: Destination Software; EU: Zoo Digital Publishing
- Producer: Scott J. Langteau
- Designer: Lynn Henson
- Programmer: Adrian Jones
- Composer: Michael Giacchino
- Series: Medal of Honor
- Platforms: PlayStation, Game Boy Advance
- Release: PlayStation: NA: October 25, 2000; EU: December 1, 2000; Game Boy Advance: NA: November 25, 2002; EU: May 9, 2003
- Genre: First-person shooter
- Modes: Single-player, multiplayer

Medal of Honor: Underground is a 2000 first-person shooter video game developed by DreamWorks Interactive and published by Electronic Arts as the second installment in the Medal of Honor video game series and was released for the PlayStation with an adapted port later for the Game Boy Advance, developed by Rebellion Developments.

In 2002, the game was re-released in Europe as part of the compilation Medal of Honor / Medal of Honor: Underground. It later was re-released a second time on the North American PlayStation Network for the PlayStation 3 and PlayStation Portable. It was the last game developed by DreamWorks Interactive when the studio was still jointly owned by Microsoft Games and DreamWorks SKG. During the game's release, the studio was renamed EA Los Angeles.

== Gameplay ==
The gameplay is much like its predecessor requiring the player to complete objectives by acquiring items, interacting with objects and destroying specified targets as well as the use of four different weapons and disguise against enemies. As well as new types of weapons, the new mechanics in the game are fighting against tanks and halftracks in three out of eight missions and fighting alongside friendly allies.

After completing the game, the player can play a non-canon bonus level, named "Panzerknacker Unleashed", in which the player plays as Lieutenant Jimmy Patterson. Many strange enemies are fought at a castle, including gun-toting and vehicle-driving dogs, knights carrying battle axes, zombie soldiers (with bodies that explode seconds after being killed), robotic soldiers which look like large nutcrackers, called Panzerknacker. The objective of all of the three missions available in this level is to build a Panzerknacker, who assists in the final mission.

=== Game Boy Advance version ===
A version of Medal of Honor: Underground was released for Game Boy Advance in 2002-2003. It is a first-person shooter based on the PlayStation version. The game was developed by Rebellion Developments and published by Destination Software. Underground for the GBA features up to 4 players using the Game Boy link cable and lex levels. The game is played in a three dimensional environment. The game's objectives usually revolve around finding certain papers. There is no save system; however, each level has a code to play again in the future, which can be viewed by pausing the game.

== Plot ==
Since 1940, France is occupied by Nazi Germany and ruled by the collaborationist Vichy regime. The game's protagonist, French Resistance commander Manon Batiste, assists her brother Jacques, who is killed in an attempted heist. Manon carries out her mission for the resistance until she is found and recruited by the OSS, who assign her around North Africa and Europe to foil the Milice and Nazis' defenses and plans of invasion until 1944, when Manon returns to help liberate Paris and avenge Jacques.

== Development ==
The main character Manon Batiste is based on Hélène Deschamps Adams, a real-life member of the Office of Strategic Services (OSS), the forerunner of Central Intelligence Agency (CIA). Adams appears in the game's final mission to brief Manon before the level. Hirschmann, Langteau and Henson researched by meeting up with people who had been involved with the French Resistance including Elizabeth Peet McIntosh and Deschamps Adams.

Michael Giacchino explains that for "Manon, I wanted a theme that could convey one emotion at a particular moment, and then a completely different emotion the next without having to rely on two completely different themes. As a result, Manon's two main themes are very similar and yet very different. One version of the theme stays the course in a major tone, conveying a feel of great national purpose against the Nazi menace, and the secondary theme dips into a minor 6th chord which describes Manon's more intimate and emotional feelings as an individual and a woman who is pitted against the fascist war machine. Both of these themes are bookended with what liner notes author Paul Tonks has aptly named 'the resolve theme'. This theme was meant to represent the moments where Manon is called upon to steel her nerves and gather the courage to continue on with the fight....Manon travels to places that are not quite so militaristic as Jimmy Patterson. Her journey was a bit more 'scenic'." Critic Ian Lace said of her theme: "One has to suppose that the main character of this new game, Manon, inspired by the exploits of Hélène Déschamps is French. Michael Giacchino has created a theme for her that in its first few notes irresistibly makes me want to anticipate the old pop song, 'Arrivederci Roma' which I found disconcerting because she is French and so much of the action, particularly at the beginning and end, takes place in Paris."

Producer Scott Langteau offers that "Underground had an entirely different feel than the original [Medal of Honor], and yet the gameplay was entirely familiar. That's what we tried to do, anyway. In Underground, it was personal. The game's front end was gritty and less militarily organized; it was rustic and roughly hewn. The same can be said for the game. Manon used petrol bombs and also used her femininity to gain access to restricted areas. We used the freedom of telling her backstory- she was in the French Resistance, then joined the OSS-to give the game its own flair and widely varied missions that took us all over Europe: Greece, Italy, etc."

Producer Scott J. Langteau showcased the game at the E3 2000 along with Tony Rowe and Lynn Henson.

== Reception ==
Reception

Aggregate score
Aggregator	Score	
Aggregator	GBA	PS
Metacritic	46/100	86/100

Review scores
Publication	Score	
Publication	GBA	PS
AllGame	N/A	3.5/5
CNET Gamecenter	N/A	8/10
Edge	N/A	7/10
Electronic Gaming Monthly	N/A	7.67/10 (Note: In Electronic Gaming Monthly's review of the PlayStation version, one critic gave it 8/10, and the rest gave it each a score of 7.5/10.)
EP Daily	N/A	8.5/10
Game Informer	N/A	9/10
GameFan	N/A	89% (Note: In GameFan's viewpoint of the PlayStation version, two critics gave it each a score of 89, and the other gave it 88.) (MVS) 83%
GameRevolution	N/A	B
GameSpot	5.5/10	7.6/10
IGN	N/A	9/10
Next Generation	N/A	4/5
Nintendo Power	2.3/5	N/A
Official U.S. PlayStation Magazine	N/A	4/5
Maxim	N/A	8/10

The PlayStation version received "favorable" reviews, while the Game Boy Advance version received "unfavorable" reviews, according to video game review aggregator website Metacritic. Jeff Lundrigan of NextGen said of the former version, "A terrific game gets a sequel that's in some ways even better. And after all, it's still true: at the end of the day, nothing is more satisfying than shooting a Nazi in the face." Nintendo Power gave the latter version a negative review, a few months before it was released Stateside. Air Gendrix of GamePro said of the former console version, "Fans of the first Medal will feel right at home with Underground, but the game also delivers enough new touches and surprises to prevent it from becoming merely a copycat sequel." (Note: GamePro gave the PlayStation version 4.5/5 for graphics, and three 5/5 scores for sound, control, and fun factor.)

GameSpot praised the makers of the PlayStation version for taking "a character from the original game named Manon Batiste and [placing] her in the lead role so that her full story can be told. This setting is a welcome change, as Underground provides a meaningful historical context that's rare in most video games today." William Abner similarly described the same version as "a refreshing change of pace because you played Manon Batiste, a woman enlisted in the French Resistance."

The PlayStation version was a runner-up for the "Best Sound" and "Best Shooter" awards at GameSpot's Best and Worst of 2000 Awards, which went to SSX and Perfect Dark, respectively. The same console version won the award for Sound at IGN's Best of 2000 Awards. Underground won the "Sound Design" and "Original Musical Composition" awards at the AIAS' 4th Annual Interactive Achievement Awards. It also won the award for "Best Sound" at the Official U.S. PlayStation Magazine 2000 Editors' Awards.
