= Giant Squid (company) =

American video game developer

- Industry: Video games
- Founded: March 2, 2013; 13 years ago
- Headquarters: Santa Monica, California, U.S.
- Key people: Matt Nava; Nicholas Clark
- Products: Abzû; The Pathless; Sword of the Sea
- Number of employees: ~20 (2025)
- Website: giantsquidstudios.com

Giant Squid is an American independent video game development company located in Santa Monica, California. Founded by several ex-thatgamecompany staff in March 2013, the studio is most known for developing Abzû (2016), The Pathless (2020), and Sword of the Sea (2025).

== History ==
Giant Squid was founded in 2013 by Matt Nava, who previously worked at thatgamecompany as the art director for Flower (2009) and Journey (2012). Nava was joined by lead designer Nicholas Clark, and the composer for Journey, Austin Wintory. TV and film production company The Ink Factory also helped co-found the company, and was involved in providing funding for the studio's projects. The studio is located in Santa Monica, California. The studio name was chosen due to Nava's love for giant, mysterious creatures, and its connection to ink. The goal for Nava was to keep the studio small, with a team of only five to ten people.

At E3 2014, the company announced sea exploration game Abzû as their debut title. Development lasted three years, and the team partnered with publisher 505 Games to release the game in August 2016. The game received generally positive reviews upon release, with critics praising the game's visual style and music. Following the release of Abzû, the studio decided to create something bigger. The project, titled The Pathless, was released by publisher Annapurna Interactive in November 2020. The size of the team grew to 33 people during its development.

Following the release of The Pathless, the team wanted to pursue a more condensed project, and returned to a visual design that is more reminiscent of Journey's art style. The game's development lasted for more than five years, and the studio was able to secure funding from PlayStation Indies, an initiative launched by Sony Interactive Entertainment to support independent games. As part of a deal with Sony, Giant Squid will self-publish the game, though it also had to be released for subscribers of the PlayStation Plus subscription service at launch. The game, titled Sword of the Sea, was released on Windows and PlayStation 5 on August 19, 2025.

According to Nava, all of the studio's games were "iterations on the same kind of idea of visual design", and had a large emphasis on player movement, as Abzû, The Pathless and Sword of the Sea were inspired by his passion for scuba diving, skating and surfing respectively.

== Games ==
Year	Title	Platform(s)	Publisher
2016	Abzû	Windows, PlayStation 4, Xbox One, Nintendo Switch	505 Games
2020	The Pathless	Windows, PlayStation 4, PlayStation 5, Nintendo Switch, Xbox One, Xbox Series X/S, iOS, macOS	Annapurna Interactive
2025	Sword of the Sea	Windows, PlayStation 5, Nintendo Switch 2, Xbox Series X/S	Giant Squid, Fictions
