= SSX Tricky =

2001 video game

- North American cover art
- Developers: EA Canada; Visual Impact (GBA)
- Publisher: EA Sports BIG
- Producers: Larry LaPierre; Adam Mackay-Smith; Steve Rechtschaffner
- Programmer: Jon Spencer
- Artist: Ian Lloyd
- Series: SSX
- Platforms: PlayStation 2, GameCube, Xbox, Game Boy Advance
- Release: 6 November 2001: PlayStation 2; NA: 6 November 2001; EU: 30 November 2001 GameCube; NA: 27 November 2001; EU: 12 July 2002 Xbox; NA: 11 December 2001; EU: 14 June 2002 Game Boy Advance; NA: 29 October 2002; EU: 1 November 2002
- Genre: Sports (snowboarding)
- Modes: Single-player, multiplayer

SSX Tricky, also known as SSX 2 or SSX 2: Tricky, is a snowboarding video game, the second game in the SSX series published by Electronic Arts under the EA Sports BIG label and developed by EA Canada. A direct sequel to SSX, the game was originally released in 2001 for PlayStation 2, GameCube, and Xbox, and was later ported to the Game Boy Advance in 2002. SSX 3 followed in 2003.

In SSX Tricky, players can choose among twelve characters, participate in races or trick competitions, and earn rewards. It is named after Run-DMC's "It's Tricky", a song that is featured throughout the game. Additionally, the game includes a behind-the-scenes making-of video, which is labelled DVD Content in the main menu. One of the major new features is the addition of Uber Tricks, absurdly unrealistic and exaggerated tricks, often involving detaching the board from the snowboarder's feet. The player can gain access to Uber Tricks during play after filling the adrenaline bar; performing six Uber Tricks earns the player unlimited boost for the rest of the race. Another added feature is the rivalry system, where knocking down an opponent will make them more hostile.

SSX Tricky was the first game in the series to be released on multiple consoles, as the original SSX was one of the PS2's launch games. Its PS2 version received a 92% score on Metacritic, sold over 800,000 units worldwide, and like other games in the series achieved Platinum status. Though reviewers felt that the game was more an improved version of SSX rather than a true sequel, it was critically acclaimed for its added features, voice acting, and general improvements, leading to calls for a remake into the 2020s.

== Gameplay ==
Gameplay continues the same basic method introduced in the original SSX. The main tracks are remixes from the previous game like Merqury City, which takes place in a New York City-based downtown area, and Tokyo Megaplex, a course resembling a giant pinball machine, plus two new tracks, Garibaldi and Alaska. It features twelve characters: the returning Elise Riggs, Mackenzie "Mac" Fraser (NTSC version), Kaori Nishidake, Zoe Payne, Moby Jones, and Jean-Paul "JP" Arsenault, plus new ones like Psymon Stark, Edward "Eddie" Wachowski, Seeiah Owens, Luther-Dwayne Grady, Marisol Diez Delgado, Broderick "Brodi" Ford, Martin "Marty" Stieber (PAL version), who replaces Mac, and Kim Yuri (NTSC Korean version), who replaces Kaori. Hiro Karamatsu and Jurgen Angermann did not return, which was justified as suffering off-season injuries. Winning medals in a variety of events unlocks new courses, characters, and boards, as well as improved the boarder's abilities. New outfits may be earned by completing a character's trick book, by doing a number of specific tricks during play. Three kinds of boards are available to players: trick-oriented Freestyle boards, all-around BX boards, and racing-oriented Alpine boards, which are not meant to be ridden backwards.

The important new feature added to the series are the Uber moves. If players are able to fill their boost bar to the maximum, they will be able to perform Uber moves, which involve characters taking their feet off their board and doing over the top moves. If a player successfully lands an Uber move, they are given a short amount of time for infinite boost, which can be topped off by performing more Uber moves. Each player can perform five Uber moves, including a personal move if the character is using a board that matches their style. If a player successfully performs six Uber moves, spelling out TRICKY on the boost bar, they will have infinite boost for the remainder of the race. Also introduced in the game is a rivalry system in the World Circuit mode. If the player is friendly with another artificial intelligence (AI) character, they will treat the player favourably; however, if the player ends up annoying other AI characters, generally by attacking them during the race in order to fill the adrenaline bar, they will become hostile towards players in future events.

=== Modes ===
There are four modes of gameplay:

Freeride
The Freeride mode does not allow players to unlock characters or boards. It enables players to play with either one or two players, as well as allowing the player to get to know the course. It allows the player to unlock outfits by completing a trick chapter.
Practice
Practice mode is the place for beginners to get the opportunity to get used to snowboarding. As in Freeride, players have the ability to do what they wish and to practice tricks.
World Circuit
In the World Circuit mode, players have the ability to unlock characters, boards, and outfits by racing and competing in events. There are two main categories of events: Race and Showoff. In Race, the player must compete in the Quarter Final and Semi Final rounds, and then in the Final round and get within the top three places to win that track; the medals are bronze, silver, and gold.
There are eight tracks to complete. When racing, players must attempt to stay in the lead of their five opponents. In Showoff, players are required to perform as many fancy tricks as they can and obtain as many points as they can.
If this mode is completed in Race, the extra track Untracked is unlocked but is available for Freeride only. Similar to Untracked is Pipedream, available for Freeride and Single Event (Showoff only), which is unlocked by winning a medal on all Showoff courses.
Single Event
Single Event takes one of the events over a single heat from World Circuit mode, including Race, Showoff, and Time Challenge. Medals are awarded at the end of the track for the first two modes and a second human player can be added for all three.

== Development ==
SSX Tricky was developed by EA Canada and created by Steven Rechtschaffner, who had worked as a producer for EA's FIFA Soccer 96 and the Triple Play baseball series, and was produced by Larry LaPierre and Adam Mackay-Smith, the latter of whom was working on EA's Need for Speed racing series at that time.

The game was originally called SSX: DVD and was intended to be a remixed, enhanced version of the original SSX, capitalizing on the success of the original game. EA Canada intended to add new areas, shortcuts, and subtly change the landscape of the environments of the original game. They also intended to have more interaction during races, redesigned character models, celebrity voice work, character specific cutscenes and more in-game music.

At some point in development it was decided to make the title into a full-fledged sequel, renaming the game SSX: Tricky. The intended features of SSX: DVD such as celebrity voiceovers and level redesigns made it into the final game, with multiple behind-the-scenes making-of videos found in the main menu under DVD Content.

A version for Game Boy Advance was developed by Visual Impact.

== Reception ==
Reception

Aggregate score
Aggregator	Score			
Aggregator	GBA	GameCube	PS2	Xbox
Metacritic	66/100	87/100	92/100	88/100

Review scores
Publication	Score			
Publication	GBA	GameCube	PS2	Xbox
AllGame	2/5	4/5	4/5	N/A
Edge	N/A	N/A	7/10	N/A
Electronic Gaming Monthly	N/A	N/A	8.5/10	N/A
Eurogamer	N/A	N/A	9/10	9/10
Famitsu	N/A	8/10, 7/10, 8/10, 9/10	N/A	N/A
Game Informer	4/10	8.5/10	9/10	9/10
GamePro	3.5/5	4.5/5	4.5/5	4.5/5
GameRevolution	N/A	B+	A−	B+
GameSpot	7.8/10	8.8/10	9.4/10	8.8/10
GameSpy	N/A	85%	4.5/5	4.5/5
GameZone	N/A	8.5/10	9/10	N/A
IGN	6.5/10	7.9/10	9.4/10	9/10
Next Generation	N/A	N/A	4/5	N/A
Nintendo Power	3/5	4.5/5	N/A	N/A
Official U.S. PlayStation Magazine	N/A	N/A	5/5	N/A
Official Xbox Magazine (US)	N/A	N/A	N/A	8.7/10
FHM	N/A	N/A	4/5	N/A

The PlayStation 2 (PS2) version received universal acclaim, and the GameCube (GC) and Xbox versions received favorable reviews, while the Game Boy Advance (GBA) version received average reviews according to Metacritic, a video game review aggregator. It was a runner-up in GameSpot's annual award categories for the best Xbox game and best alternative sports console game, losing to Halo: Combat Evolved and Tony Hawk's Pro Skater 3, respectively.

Most reviews hesitated before calling the game a true sequel, since it shared a large amount of content with the original SSX, which was published in 2000, and all but two of the courses appear in the original. Peter Suclu reviewed the PS2 version of the game for Next Generation, rating it four stars out of five, and stated: "If you haven't played SSX, this is a must-buy, but if you already own the game, the full-price 'expansion pack' is hardly revolutionary." Reviews like that of IGN's Aaron Boulding complimented the added features, such as Uber tricks and rivalry with other boarders. Some reviewers, such as Shan Satterfield for GameSpot, thought that the improvements over the original were so good that SSX Tricky was billed as the best snowboarding game to date. IGN's Peer Schneider wrote: "Overall, the PS2 SSX Tricky delivers the best control setup for returning players, but if you've never played SSX before you might as well go for the best-looking and sounding version: SSX Tricky for Xbox."

The voice acting, which included Lucy Liu, David Arquette, Macy Gray, Oliver Platt, and Billy Zane, was praised by reviewers, including GameSpy's Michael G. Moen, who commented that the use of celebrities like Liu helped bring the outrageous characters to life. The music system received much acclaim, as it was able to adapt to suit the situation. Each course had specific songs paired with it to match the mood and when riders reached maximum boost or were knocked down, the music reacted accordingly. The size of the environments, the detail of the graphics, and the trick system also received plenty of recognition from reviewers. In Japan, Famitsu gave it a score of 32 out of 40 for the GC version, 30 out of 40 for the PS2 version, and three sevens and one eight (29/40) for the Xbox version.

During the 5th Annual Interactive Achievement Awards, the Academy of Interactive Arts & Sciences nominated SSX Tricky for the "Console Sports" award.

The PS2 version sold over 800,000 units worldwide, earning the Platinum status. In predicting the sales for the game, PSX Extreme said: "It's quite unfortunate if I do say so myself, because a AAA title like SSX Tricky won't be getting the sales it really deserves." SSX Tricky remains decades later one of the best games in the extreme sports genre. In 2016, IGN called it the 95th best PS2 game. The staff cited its improvements over its predecessor, including "flashier Uber moves".

== Legacy ==
SSX Tricky is noted to have increased the popularity of Run-DMC's song "It's Tricky", which is used as the game's main theme. The renowned song's connection to the game and its fans led to its inclusion in the 2012 reboot SSX.

=== Possible remake ===
Into the 2020s, amid a number of games getting remade, fans have been clamoring for a remake of SSX Tricky. In 2020, Steven Rechtschaffner, the producer of SSX Tricky, expressed his interest and the possibility of a remake of the game. When the game's successor SSX 3 was re-released for Xbox One in 2018, he was impressed, saying that a remake of SSX Tricky could work. Rechtschaffner said that it is not his decision but rather of the developers and EA, who own the intellectual property.

In 2021, Rechtschaffner said he was working on a spiritual successor of SSX, revealed to be Project Gravity, a free-to-play live service snowboarding game from Rechtschaffner's team at Supernatural Studios.
