= SSX (2012 video game) =

- North American cover art
- Developer: EA Canada
- Publisher: EA Sports
- Series: SSX
- Platforms: PlayStation 3, Xbox 360, Android
- Release: NA: February 28, 2012; AU: March 1, 2012; EU: March 2, 2012; Android: WW: 23 December 2013
- Genre: Sports (snowboarding)
- Modes: Single-player, multiplayer

SSX is a 2012 snowboarding video game developed by EA Canada and published by Electronic Arts under its EA Sports label. Released on PlayStation 3 and Xbox 360 in early 2012, it is a reboot of the SSX series and the sixth installment overall. The game was revealed at the Spike Video Game Awards in 2010 under the working title SSX: Deadly Descents, the game's trailer appeared to show a much darker direction to the series than previous entries, though later footage revealed a return to a lighter tone. SSX includes the use of real locations, rather than the fictional courses of past games. The game received positive reviews from critics.

== Gameplay ==
SSX is a snowboarding game which can be controlled via buttons or analogue sticks, although an option for classic controls from earlier entries in the series is available. Throughout the game, players navigate various snowy levels and perform tricks. Players receive a speed boost for successfully performing tricks. By filling up the boost meter completely, players enter 'Tricky' mode, which makes a return from SSX Tricky. During this mode, players have unlimited boost and tricks will now become wilder 'Über' tricks. If players perform enough Über tricks whilst in Tricky mode, they will enter 'Super Tricky' mode, allowing for wilder Über tricks called Super Über tricks as well as having prolonged unlimited boost, which can last longer if the player continuously performs tricks. As players perform tricks, they build up a combo bonus which goes through a multiplier once cashed in, but will be lost if the player bails. If players make a mistake, they can rewind time to get back on track, although this will cost trick points and cause time loss (time continues normally for opponents).

The bulk of the game is the World Tour mode, in which Team SSX attempts to conquer the nine deadly descents across the world, including the Himalayas and Antarctica. During each location, players train a specific rider to tackle the descent via a series of events which generally involve either defeating opponents in a race or obtaining the highest trick score. These culminate in a Deadly Descent stage, in which the player is tasked with safely making it to the end of the level with a limited number of rewinds. Each of these descents features dangerous obstacles, such as trees, avalanches, large drops, low oxygen, freezing areas and darkness. To face these threats, the player can equip various helpful gadgets. These include body armor to defend against rocks and trees, wingsuits to clear large gaps, pickaxes to aid turning on icy surfaces, and flashlights to light up dark areas. Playing through this mode unlocks new areas and characters for use in other modes.

Other modes include Explore Mode, in which players can freely explore the various mountains and take on various challenges, and Global Events, in which players can take on various challenge online, although certain features will require an online pass, either sold with new copies of the game or purchased online. Performing well in any of the modes earns the players SSX Credits which can be used to purchase new boards or gadget upgrades. Players are also able to plant Geotags throughout the various levels, challenging players to try and reach them in order to earn some extra credits.

=== Characters ===
Original SSX character Elise Riggs returns. Mackenzie "Mac" Fraser, Kaori Nishidake, Moby Jones, Psymon Stark, Zoe Payne, Griff Simmons and Eddie Wachowski (pre-order bonus from GameStop) also appear in the game. New characters include Tane Mumea, Alex Moreau, and Ty Thorsen. Travis Rice was later made available as a DLC character, making him the only real-life snowboarder to feature in the game series.

== Plot ==
The World Tour follows biker Zoe Payne who, along with snowboarder Mac Fraser and surfer Tane Mumea, has founded Team SSX (which stands for Snowboarding, Surfing, and Motocross). Gathering a team of nine of the best riders in the world, Team SSX plans to conquer the nine deadliest descents across the world in order to raise funds via livestreaming. However, a former SSX member, Griff Simmons, is seeking to conquer the nine descents himself, leading to a race against time to see who will conquer the world first.

== Soundtrack ==
The soundtrack features a large number of tracks spanning different genres. Run–D.M.C.'s "It's Tricky" remixed by Pretty Lights from SSX Tricky returns. The game introduces a new remixing technology known as "Harmony" that can dynamically remix any song during gameplay, including custom soundtracks. Flux Pavilion's song "I Can't Stop" was accidentally excluded from the list.

== Downloadable content ==
Three packs of downloadable content were released in 2012. On April 3, EA released two characters, Eddie Wachowski and Travis Rice, which were previously only available with pre-orders of the game, and limited Facebook app codes, respectively.

On May 1, EA released content entitled "Mount Eddie & Classic Characters Pack" to Xbox Live and the PlayStation Network. The downloadable content contained seven characters from SSX Tricky and SSX 3, three songs from the previous games, and a new mountain. The mountain, named "Mount Eddie", contains several elements reminiscent of the previous games, including large jumps, halfpipes, fireworks, billboards, and an overall colorful environment.

EA released a content pack, free to all players entitled "Mt. Fugi & Friends Pack" for Xbox 360 and PlayStation 3. The content included the characters Eddie Wachowski and Travis Rice. also included in this pack was ultimate snowboards for 5 characters, Eddie, Zoe, Mac, Kaori, and Elise.

On August 7, EA released a patch update with two new game modes. The first mode, entitled "3-2-1 GO!", added live multiplayer gameplay. This mode allowed up to five players to compete simultaneously in a race or trick event. The second mode, called Freeride, let players ride down any mountain without any time limits, ghosts or scores.

== Reception ==
Reception

Aggregate score
Aggregator	Score
Metacritic	(X360) 82/100 (PS3) 81/100

Review scores
Publication	Score
Edge	5/10
Eurogamer	9/10
G4	4.5/5
GameSpot	8.5/10
IGN	9/10
PlayStation Official Magazine – UK	8/10
Official Xbox Magazine (UK)	9/10
Official Xbox Magazine (US)	7.5/10

SSX received generally positive reviews from critics, with a Metacritic score of 82 and 81 for the Xbox 360 and PlayStation 3 versions respectively, signifying "generally favorable reviews".

IGN gave SSX a score of 9/10 in their review, stating "SSX is the video game this generation has been missing". Reviews praised the new entry for the motivation behind its development; Eurogamer said that "few series have enjoyed such an assured and enjoyable update in the current generation of consoles", noting it was far from being "a weary evolution", while IGN remarked that "this is what happens when you don't just put the game out every year". However, Edge gave the game a 5/10, opening that SSX "has found a worthy infrastructure to establish an online community, but this same approach has found the brand veering away from some of the fun...of yesteryear, leaving its more seductive silly side out in the cold".

According to EA's Labels President Frank Gibeau, SSX was a better success than EA's first-person shooter Syndicate which the company was expecting to perform successfully. In May 2012, the game topped #1 on the UK sales charts. SSX was the fifth best selling game in the United States behind Mass Effect 3, Resident Evil: Operation Raccoon City, MLB 12: The Show, and NBA 2K12.
