= Abzû =

2016 adventure video game

- Developer: Giant Squid
- Publisher: 505 Games
- Director: Matt Nava
- Programmer: Brian Balamut
- Artist: Matt Nava
- Composer: Austin Wintory
- Engine: Unreal Engine 4
- Platforms: PlayStation 4; Windows; Xbox One; Nintendo Switch
- Release: PlayStation 4, Windows; August 2, 2016; Xbox One; December 6, 2016; Nintendo Switch; November 29, 2018; Amazon Luna; October 20, 2020
- Genres: Adventure, simulation
- Mode: Single-player

Abzû (Note: The title is stylized as ABZÛ, and translated by the developers as Ocean of Wisdom.) is an adventure video game developed by Giant Squid and published by 505 Games for PlayStation 4, Windows, Xbox One, Nintendo Switch, and Amazon Luna. Initially released as a digital title in August 2016, a retail version for consoles was released in January 2017. Following the journey of a diver exploring the ocean and restoring life using sonar calls, the gameplay allows the player to freely navigate underwater environments ranging from open water and natural caverns to ancient ruins.

Development lasted three years, involving a team of thirteen people. Several members, including director Matt Nava and composer Austin Wintory, had previously worked on the 2012 video game Journey—the ocean setting of Abzû was both a reaction to the desert setting of Journey and inspired by Nava's love of scuba diving. The setting and story drew from Sumerian mythology and the cosmic ocean myth. Reaching high positions in sales charts, Abzû was praised by journalists: the majority of praise went to its art style, with some critics comparing it to Journey.

== Gameplay ==
In-game screenshot showing the playable character underwater

In Abzû, the player takes on the role of a diver in a vast ocean—after waking up floating on the ocean's surface, the diver begins exploring the surrounding underwater environments filled with plant and animal life, in addition to uncovering ancient technology and submerged ruins. In a few areas, the diver is also able to explore land-based environments above the water. As the game progresses, the diver unlocks new areas and pursues the secrets behind the forces harming the local environment. The diver's course through the game follows a linear path through interconnected areas filled with marine life. The player directs the diver through the environments using full analogue control, able to interact with the environment to solve switch or item-based puzzles, and the ability to meditate which grants the character the ability to sit on the shark-shaped pedestals within each area to observe the surrounding sea life. The diver can accelerate, and interact with marine life using sonar chimes. The diver can grab onto the bodies of larger marine animals and ride on them. Each area sports hidden collectables for the diver to find.

== Synopsis ==
The narrative of Abzû is told wordlessly through gameplay and using cutscenes, taking place in a vast ocean. The player character, a female diver, (Note: The diver is referred to as female in the developer diary.) awakens floating in the ocean and begins exploring the surrounding sea: ruins and ancient murals show that an ancient civilization once shared a symbiotic connection with this ocean. As she explores she is led by a great white shark to wells that, when activated using an energy from within her, restore life to the local seas. That energy is being forcefully harvested by robotic pyramid-like devices, the development of which disrupted the ocean's balance and brought about the civilization's downfall. Upon reaching the original pyramid, the diver sees the great white shark attacking it, and the pyramid's counterattack damages the diver—revealing her to be a mechanical robot, confirming her existence as a being connected to the pyramid and capable of restoring life to the ocean—and mortally wounds the great white shark, which dies as the diver comforts it. After activating the final well, the great white shark manifests and guides the repaired diver back to the original pyramid which the diver destroys, returning life to the ocean. During the credits, the diver and great white shark swim together through the revitalized ocean. It is unclear whether the diver survived, or if the cutscene shows the diver in the afterlife with the spirit of the great white shark, referring to the circle of death and life renewal that the ocean reflects.

== Development ==
The origins of Abzû lay in the development of Journey, an independent video game developed by Thatgamecompany and released in 2012. Abzû's creator, director and art director Matt Nava had previously worked as art director for Journey during its three-year development. Having worked in a game featuring a desert setting, Nava wanted to change to a more vibrant and populated setting for his next title. Nava began creating the pitch for Abzû before leaving Thatgamecompany and founding the game's developer Giant Squid Studios. One of the main elements Nava incorporated was his love for ancient cultures and their artwork, particularly relating to the myths surrounding the concept of Abzu. Nava's love of the ocean, which he explored through his hobby of scuba diving, also figured heavily in the design of Abzû. The team at Giant Squid Studios grew to ten developers from across the industry, mainly programmers who specialized in multiple aspects of game design from gameplay to graphics, in addition to a graphical and technical artist who helped create and animate the character models.

The game was first announced at the 2014 Electronic Entertainment Expo (E3). It was later previewed at E3 2016. The game's initial digital release was on PlayStation 4 via PlayStation Network and Windows through Steam on August 2, 2016. Later it was also released digitally on Xbox One through Xbox Live on December 6, 2016. The game also received a physical release for PlayStation 4 and Xbox One on January 31, 2017. A Nintendo Switch version was released through the Nintendo eShop on November 29, 2018. It was released in Japan on February 27, 2020. It was also included in the early access release of the cloud gaming platform Amazon Luna on October 20, 2020. All versions were published by 505 Games.

=== Design ===
The game's title stems from Sumerian mythology, particularly the myth of the ocean goddess Tiamat and the fresh water god Abzu uniting to form all life: a reason this was chosen was that myths surrounding land-based life and their supposed origins in a cosmic ocean were a recurring theme in multiple world mythologies. The title is made up of the Sumerian words "ab" (water) and "zu" (to know), translated by the developers as "Ocean of Wisdom". The word provided difficulties early on, as the Sumerian spelling "Abzu" differed from the Akkadian spelling "Apsû". As a compromise, the team merged the two spellings into the game's title. The circumflex over the letter "u" caused problems for the team as hardly anyone knew how to type it and the computer programs had trouble handling it as part of the coding. The use of the word played into the game's focus on the ocean due to its mythic connections. The Middle Eastern influences extended to the game's architecture, and incorporated Nava's wish for structures to have meaning beyond being simple scenery or tools for player progression.

The aim from an early stage was not to simulate diving, but instead to capture the dream-like feeling of ocean exploration. As part of his research, Nava experimented with other ocean simulation games and found they were not "fun". By removing any time limit or air gauge, the team sought to promote a relaxing sense of exploration. The meditation mechanic was added during later development from 2015 to 2016 as a means of allowing players a view of the surrounding marine life and environment. When choosing their game engine, Matt Nava was still the only staff member and so they needed an easy-to-use platform with tools and technology to create the game. Unreal Engine 4 was still quite new at this time, but it was chosen after the team had vetted other developer software available at the time. The team were able to use both Unreal Engine 4's advanced developer tools and expand the engine's functionality to incorporate unique elements such as fish shoal behavior, vegetation animation, and underwater lighting. Using Unreal Engine 4 allowed engineer Derek Cornish to construct unique systems for underwater lighting effects.

The artistic style was meant to portray a vibrant underwater world, but the team also needed to prevent activity on-screen from overwhelming the player, so a stylized look was chosen to both maintain the game's artistic style and reduce the amount of "visual noise". Environmental editing was a big issue for the team, with much of their early development dedicated to creating editing tools that could do small-scale edits to environments after they had been locked down. When creating the environments, Nava drew on his experience developing Flower for Thatgamecompany, creating sporadically scattered interaction points that triggered with player exploration and triggered new life or new elements within each environment. Since there was no dedicated animator, the team needed to use multiple techniques for animating the diver, fish and flexible vegetation: the diver used a skeletal animation run through a complex state machine, vegetation such as seaweed used rope physics, while fish mainly used mathematical motion in combination with morph target posing to remove the need of individual skeletal structures.

The types of fish seen in Abzû were based on real-life creatures from the oceans of Earth, and to fit them into the game each species was distilled down to its most distinctive traits. The team had "tens of thousands" of fish within the game. Their swimming styles were directly modeled on the behavior and physics of real fish movements. The number of fish presented problems with running the game, but the programming staff developed a method of simplifying each fish's animation without compromising the game's visuals, which "multiplied the number of fish possible on screens by 10". Each fish species had its own unique artificial intelligence that had cascading levels of awareness and interaction with other species and objects in the environment. The team started with getting the fish to swim without clipping through walls, then built upon that with further expansion on fish behavior and interaction. Their most challenging task was creating realistic bait balling effects for shoals of small fish, which was only achieved and finalized near the end of development. The developers did take liberties by grouping together types of fish from different parts of the globe which would normally not be able to interact, though this fell in line with the game's overall theme and the myths it referenced. Despite this, the developers emulated the zones that each fish would be found in, whether it be a coral reef or the deep ocean where sunlight does not reach. The amount of work and the team's dedication to creating a realistic and vibrant experience meant they were creating fish until development finished.

=== Music ===
The soundtrack for Abzû was composed, conducted, and produced by Austin Wintory, who had previously worked on Journey and The Banner Saga. Wintory was first shown concept art for the project by Nava before Giant Squid Studios was founded and development began. When the studio was founded, Wintory was invited on board the project. The music was written from the start to be interactive and dynamic rather than based on specific cues. To achieve this, Wintory had to play the game extensively and repeatedly to get a sense for what players would experience and what would best match the mood. Similar to Wintory's work on Journey, the first track written was the main theme "To Know, Water" and further tracks were created over the game's three year development based on that theme. The track titles from the second piece onwards were taken either from an English translation of the Enūma Eliš, or were named after marine creatures featured in levels where the tracks featured. The credits theme was purely choral, with the lyrics sung at normal speed.

The score's instrumental element began with using a harp as its base, with a choir being used later. The choir sections, performed by the London Voices Choir were used to represent the spiritual elements of the story. The lyrics were the first ten lines of the Enūma Eliš used for each track with drawn-out syllables to sound alien. More instrumentation was needed, with a full orchestra eventually being incorporated. As with his work on Journey and Assassin's Creed Syndicate, he used a soloist alongside an ensemble orchestra: in this case, the solo instrument was an oboe. The oboe solos were performed by Kristin Naigus, whom Wintory had heard performing a cover of a track from Journey on YouTube. The music for early levels went through extensive redrafts with an estimated fifty minutes of music being discarded for five minutes left in-game, though pieces of later sections came together quickly and remained generally unchanged. The Diver's theme formed a recurring leitmotif throughout the score. Wintory worked closely with Abzû's sound designer Steve Green and created a music-based story that flowed alongside and worked with the visual narrative of Abzû.

The official soundtrack was released as a digital album through Bandcamp and iTunes on August 2, 2016. A physical edition was released on October 22 through Varèse Sarabande. The album included a long piece of music in the track "Balaenoptera Musculus" that was not used in-game, but was included by Wintory as he liked the piece. Music reviewers were generally positive about the soundtrack album. The soundtrack later won the 2017 Game Audio Network Guild's "Best Original Soundtrack Album" award. The soundtrack was also nominated at the 2017 BAFTA Games Awards in the "Music" category, but lost to Virginia. During the 20th Annual D.I.C.E. Awards, the Academy of Interactive Arts & Sciences nominated Abzû for "Outstanding Achievement in Original Music Composition", which was ultimately awarded to Doom. For his work on Abzû, Wintory won the 2016 International Film Music Critics Association award for "Best Original Score for a Video Game or Interactive Media", making his second win in a row. The score was also nominated at the Hollywood Music in Media Awards in the "Original Score – Video Game" category. Reviewers of the game also gave unanimous praise to the soundtrack, positively comparing it to that of Journey.

Track list

No.	Title	Length
1.	"To know, water"	1:58
2.	"Heaven Was Not Named"	1:28
3.	"Seriola Lalandi"	3:16
4.	"And the Earth Did Not yet Bear a Name"	2:51
5.	"Delphinus Delphis"	4:51
6.	"No Field Was Formed"	1:51
7.	"Caranx Ignobilis"	2:10
8.	"Myliobatis Aquila"	3:30
9.	"No Destinies Ordained"	2:08
10.	"Balaenoptera Musculus"	3:57
11.	"Architeuthis"	0:59
12.	"Chaos, the Mother"	4:52
13.	"Arandaspis Prionotolepis"	4:19
14.	"Elasmosaurus Platyurus"	3:22
15.	"Ichthyosaurus Communis"	2:01
16.	"Osteoglossum Bicirrhosum"	1:15
17.	"Their Waters Were Mingled Together"	10:13
18.	"Then Were Created the Gods in the Midst of Heaven"	3:49
Total length:		58:57

== Reception ==
Reception

Aggregate scores
Aggregator	Score
Metacritic	PC: 83/100; PS4: 78/100; XONE: 83/100; NS: 80/100
OpenCritic	73% recommend

Review scores
Publication	Score
Destructoid	7/10
Eurogamer	Recommended
Game Informer	8/10
GameSpot	9/10
GamesRadar+	4/5
IGN	8.4/10
PC Gamer (UK)	88/100
Polygon	7.5/10
VideoGamer.com	8/10

In its debut week on Steam, the game reached #9 in platform sales charts. Abzû was at #18 among the best-selling titles on PlayStation Store's PS4 charts for August, being the third best-selling new title that month behind Batman: The Telltale Series (#7) and No Man's Sky (#1). The PS4 and PC versions received scores of 78 and 83 on aggregate site Metacritic based on 19 and 72 reviews respectively, each denoting "generally favorable" reception. Fellow review aggregator OpenCritic assessed that the game received strong approval, being recommended by 73% of critics. Abzû was nominated at The Game Awards 2016 in the "Best Art Direction" category; at the Golden Joystick Awards in the "Best Original Game", "Best Visual Design" and "PlayStation Game of the Year" categories; and at the 2017 BAFTA Games Awards in the "Artistic Achievement" category.

Martin Gaston of Eurogamer called it "a mechanically simple game, but a pleasurable one"—while finding early sections barren and the camera awkward at times, he enjoyed the gameplay's simplicity. Scott Butterworth of GameSpot found the gameplay lacking in variety, but otherwise praised the game's immersive qualities. Justin McElroy of Polygon felt that the gameplay, while generally enjoyable, was undermined by a lack of player interaction. Zack Furniss of Destructoid found swimming easy and enjoyable despite simplistic controls, and found that the experience benefited from its short length. Matthew Kato of Game Informer found the lack of interaction was balanced out by the sheer spectacle of environments and swimming with marine life. Jose Otero of IGN enjoyed the continued rewards of exploration despite its minimal amount of gameplay mechanics, while James Davenport of PC Gamer enjoyed both the exploration and the ability to meditate and observe the environment. Tom Orry of VideoGamer.com enjoyed the gameplay but disliked its lack of seamless environments, and David Roberts of GamesRadar+ felt that the game's biggest strength was its simplicity when compared to other titles on the market at the time.

The visuals and environments were generally praised for their artistic style and beauty, with many citing the graphics as one of the game's main strengths; Butterworth positively compared the graphics to the cel-shaded style of The Legend of Zelda: The Wind Waker, Otero called the game's art direction "fantastic" and praised the consistent framerate, while Orry praised the art style and graphics despite the simplistic models making Abzû appear "basic looking". Reactions to the story were generally positive, with many critics calling it an emotive experience, with many noting its narrative as being mostly open to interpretation: Kato compared the game's themes to 2001: A Space Odyssey. Some reviewers were less positive: Furniss felt that Abzû's story was not as grand as its developers touted, while Davenport found it overly familiar to the point of being cliche. Multiple reviewers favorably compared the artistic style and gameplay experience to Journey and the previous work of Thatgamecompany. Roberts in particular noted that some players might find it too similar to the likes of Journey.
