= SSX 3 =

2003 video game

- North American cover art
- Developer: EA Canada
- Publisher: EA Sports BIG
- Producer: Larry LaPierre
- Programmer: Mike Rayner
- Artists: Geoff Coates; Henry LaBounta; Ian Lloyd
- Series: SSX
- Platforms: GameCube, PlayStation 2, Xbox, Game Boy Advance, Gizmondo
- Release: October 21, 2003: GameCube, PlayStation 2, Xbox; NA: October 21, 2003; EU: October 31, 2003 Game Boy Advance; NA: November 11, 2003; EU: November 21, 2003 Gizmondo; EU: August 31, 2005; NA: October 22, 2005
- Genre: Sports (snowboarding)
- Modes: Single-player, multiplayer

SSX 3 is a 2003 snowboarding video game developed by EA Canada and published by Electronic Arts under the EA Sports BIG label. The third installment in the SSX series, it was released on October 21, 2003, for the PlayStation 2, Xbox, and GameCube, and was later ported to the Game Boy Advance by Visual Impact on November 11, 2003, and to the Gizmondo by Exient Entertainment on August 31, 2005, as a launch title.

Set on a fictional mountain, the single-player mode follows snowboarders competing in the SSX Championship. Players choose from a variety of characters and take part in various events in different locations, earning points and money by performing tricks, winning races, completing goals, and finding collectables. Money can be used to upgrade character attributes, buy new clothes and boards, and unlock music and extras. Multiple players can play against each other in local multiplayer modes, and an online multiplayer mode also allowed players to connect to games and play against each other online on the PS2 version of the game, but it has since been discontinued.

Development of SSX 3 initially began in 2001 following the release of SSX Tricky, the previous title in the series. The development team was composed of people from various different employment backgrounds, including an Oscar-nominated visual effects designer who worked as one of the game's art directors. The game includes thirty different types of snow and general visual improvements over the previous game, such as enhanced models and shadows. It was initially confirmed through a trailer in NBA Street Vol. 2 in 2003. A soundtrack album, SSX 3 Soundtrack, was released on September 30, 2003.

SSX 3 was critically acclaimed, with reviewers praising the game's open world, trick system, presentation, and soundtrack. It was the first game in the SSX series to sell 1 million copies. IGN's Douglass C. Perry called it the best snowboarding game he had ever played, and GameSpot's Greg Kasavin recommended it not only to veterans but also for novices of the series. SSX 3 received the Academy of Interactive Arts and Sciences' awards for Console Action Sports Game of the Year and Outstanding Achievement in Licensed Soundtrack. Its 2018 re-release for Xbox One was also a success and was critically acclaimed.

== Gameplay ==
SSX 3 is a snowboard racing game played from a third-person view. Players control one of various snowboarders and compete in events set across individual courses in peaks on a mountain. Unlike previous games in the series, which contain unconnected courses, a freeride mode also allows players to freely roam the open world consisting of all the courses in the game; it is possible for the player to ride from the top of the mountain to the bottom without stopping or reloading each course. New areas are progressively unlocked throughout the game.

Players can gain points by performing tricks, such as grabs, grinds, flips, and spins. A feature returning from previous games in the SSX series is the adrenaline meter, which gains adrenaline when the player executes tricks. It can be used to provide a speed boost or, once it becomes full, perform advanced tricks called übers, which grant more points than regular tricks. Performing übers increases the level of the adrenaline meter, which leads to progressively more advanced super über tricks and faster adrenaline boosts. Performing multiple tricks of different kinds creates a combo, doubling the points acquired from tricks, while repeating the same trick causes the number of points it earns to drop. Landing tricks poorly or hitting an object in mid air will cause the snowboarder to wipe out, falling over. The player has the ability to recover their snowboarder more quickly by tapping a button, or alternatively reset the snowboarder back to the course if they get stuck in an area. Both wiping out and resetting result in a loss of adrenaline and the ability to perform übers until the adrenaline meter is filled again.

Players complete peak goals—set objectives—to progress through the single-player mode and unlock all three peaks of the mountain. Peak goals are achieved by completing events, earning money or completing big challenges and finding collectables, both during freeride mode, which can be accessed outside of events. The player only has to complete one of these goals to progress to the next peak. Completing each peak goal unlocks a trophy for the player.

A screenshot from a race event in SSX 3 showing the HUD, including the adrenaline meter on the right

Each course in the game has a designated event that players can compete in. Events fall under two categories: race and freestyle. Coming first in an event provides the player a gold medal, coming second provides the player a silver medal, and coming third provides the player a bronze medal. It is also possible to obtain a platinum medal by beating certain times or getting a high enough score. The race event objective is to get to the end of the course as quickly as possible. Players race against other snowboarder NPCs on the same course.

Races contain multiple routes and shortcuts, which can give the player an advantage over opponents. Players can also use melee combat to knock other snowboarders over, slowing them down and providing the player with adrenaline. Race events have three heats, and the player must come third place or above in each heat to progress. Once all race events are completed on a peak, the player's snowboarder is challenged to a backcountry race by their rival snowboarder. Winning unlocks a peak race, where the player aims to beat their rival's best time from the peak to the bottom of the mountain; both races have only one heat. Completing the races unlocks the next peak.

The freestyle events include slopestyle, big air, and super pipe. Their objectives are to get as many points as possible. Slopestyle courses are similar to race courses, as players must ride through a downhill track with multiple paths. While the goal of slopestyle courses is for the player to gain points by performing tricks, big air courses are short, with one or two ramps that are designed to allow the player to perform large jumps and multiple tricks in a small amount of time, and super pipe courses contain half-pipes that the player can repeatedly perform tricks on. Freestyle events are structured similarly to race events; each have three heats, and the player is invited to backcountry jams and peak jams, where points are scored through performing tricks. Completing the freestyle events unlocks the next peak.

Outside of events, players can take part in big challenges. The objectives of the challenges include jumping through hoops and collecting items, among others. Collectable crystals items can also be found on every course, and can be collected in any event and in freeride. Obtaining enough crystals and completing enough big challenges on a peak unlocks the next peak. In addition to peak goals, SSX 3 contains smaller challenges called career highlights. Similar to big challenges, objectives can vary, and include holding a handplant for five seconds or doing a certain number of übers in one event. In freeride, players can travel to any courses they have unlocked and can also go to stations; these areas contain lodges, which allow the player to save their game, edit music playlists, buy attributes to improve their snowboarder, purchase new übers, and buy or equip gear and boards to change the aesthetics of the snowboarder. Money can also be used to buy extras, such as videos, cheat characters, and game art. Money can be earned in game by performing tricks, completing big challenges and events, or collecting crystals. Earning enough money on a peak will unlock the next peak. In station areas, game narrator DJ Atomika talks to the player via EA Radio Big, a fictional radio station. He gives the player information about events and weather, as well as other miscellaneous information. While the player is on a course, the soundtrack of the game is played through EA Radio Big. Depending on how well the player is performing, the music becomes quieter and louder. The player can change what music is allowed to play at lodges.

The PlayStation 2 version of SSX 3 had an online multiplayer mode that allowed two players to race against each other over the internet. The service required an EA account to use. Players could join lobbies, where they could challenge players to races, view player statistics such as the global rank of a player, and chat with players using supported USB headsets and keyboards. Players could send messages and add up to forty friends, called buddies, using EA Messenger, an in-game instant messaging service. The online service has since been discontinued.

== Development ==
SSX 3 was developed by EA Canada and published by Electronic Arts under the EA Sports Big label. Its development began after the release of SSX Tricky, the previous title in the series, in 2001. During the development of SSX and SSX Tricky, there were plans for both games to allow the player to explore a mountain, but this was never implemented, and was instead made the focus for SSX 3. EA Canada stated that SSX 3 was designed so "just about anyone can pick up and play". Larry LaPierre, the producer of the game, stated that the developers wanted "to give people the first ever full mountain experience" and allow players to choose what they wanted to do on the mountain. The game was initially confirmed through a trailer in the 2003 game NBA Street Vol. 2 with the working title SSX 3, which later became the official title. The game was available to play by journalists before release at the July 2003 Camp EA event, and earlier in May at E3 2003. The Gizmondo version was also available to play by journalists at E3 2005.

The open ended nature of the game was influenced by Battlefield 1942 and NBA Street Vol. 2, both EA titles, as the developers of SSX 3 enjoyed features in both games that allow players to choose the way they want to play. Developers were also inspired by their own personal experiences with snowboarding at Island Lake Lodge. EA Canada hired people from various different work backgrounds to develop the game, including the Academy Award-nominated visual effects designer Henry LaBounta, who worked as one of the game's three art directors. The game contains thirty different types of snow, ranging in consistency, and rendered using various shading techniques and more realistic lighting effects than SSX Tricky. Improvements to graphics over the previous game in the series also include better models and shadows, as well as more reflections in the in-game snow. SSX 3 is the first game in the SSX series and one of the first games in general to be THX certified.

== Reception ==
Reception

Aggregate score
Aggregator	Score			
Aggregator	GBA	GameCube	PS2	Xbox
Metacritic	63/100	92/100	93/100	92/100

Review scores
Publication	Score			
Publication	GBA	GameCube	PS2	Xbox
Edge	N/A	8/10	8/10	8/10
Electronic Gaming Monthly	N/A	9/10	9/10	9/10
Eurogamer	N/A	N/A	9/10	9/10
Game Informer	4/10	9.5/10	9.5/10	9.5/10
GamePro	3.5/5	N/A	5/5	N/A
GameRevolution	N/A	A−	A−	A−
GameSpot	8.1/10	9/10	9/10	9/10
GameSpy	1/5	5/5	5/5	5/5
GameZone	5/10	9/10	9.4/10	9.7/10
IGN	4.5/10	9.3/10	9.5/10	9.4/10
Nintendo Power	3.1/5	4.3/5	N/A	N/A
Official U.S. PlayStation Magazine	N/A	N/A	5/5	N/A
Official Xbox Magazine (US)	N/A	N/A	N/A	9.1/10
Entertainment Weekly	N/A	N/A	A	N/A
Playboy	N/A	100%	100%	100%

SSX 3 received critical acclaim upon its release. Metacritic calculated an average score of 93 out of 100 for the PlayStation 2 (PS2) version based on 41 reviews, and 92 out of 100 for the Xbox and GameCube (GC) versions, both based on 27 reviews. All scores indicate universal acclaim. It is EA Sports Big's second-highest rated game on Metacritic before the first title in the SSX series. On aggregate website GameRankings, the game holds 92% for PS2 and GC based on 60 reviews and 38 reviews, respectively, and 90% for Xbox based on 41 reviews. Reviewers liked the addition of an open world, the presentation, and trick system, while finding issues with the difficulty of the controls and customization options. Douglass C. Perry of IGN stated that it "expands upon Tricky in every way", while GameSpot's Greg Kasavin wrote that it "delivers a rush like few racing games or action sports games have ever achieved".

Reviewers particularly praised SSX 3's technical advancements, with Game-Revolution's Ben Silverman calling the game's snow effects unrivaled, while also recognising its "consistently high" frame rate. Eurogamer's Tom Bramwell directed his praise at the game's draw distances, seamless animation and colourful environments, and GameSpy's Bryn Williams commended the game's lighting and particle effects. Reviewers also recognised SSX 3's open world as innovative, with Williams finding that the loading times allow players to ride across long distances "without having to wait a single second for the environments to load into memory". With a score of 9.4 out of 10, Louis Bedigian of GameZone called the PS2 version "extremely fun. The gameplay is as good as snowboarding games come." Carlos McElfish, Bedigian's colleague, was a bit less positive of the GC version but did not rate it below a score of 9.0 out of 10, saying: "The lack of fantastical obstacles and other Tricky-exclusive elements is admittedly missed, but the inclusion of so many other excellent improvements makes you quickly forget that this ain't Tricky." Tim Surette, also of GameZone, gave the Xbox version a score of 9.7 out of 10, which is a higher score than the other console versions, and called it "one of the tightest games out there... there's nothing that stands out as a negative, and everything else is a glaring positive. The abundance of 'stuff to do' keeps the gameplay fresh and makes 100% completion a task for the gods." In a slightly less positive review with a score of 70 out of 100, the reviewer for GamesTM stated that "given the constraints of the sport", the game does a great job of staying as open as possible.

The trick system was well received. Bramwell called the new super-über tricks "astonishingly cool" and stated that he was pleased that the game introduced "a much more clear-cut combo system". Perry said that the addition of board presses "make playing SSX 3 an entirely new game", adding that performing tricks is "a pleasure on the PS2 and Xbox", but criticised the GC's controls, citing that "the controller just doesn't provide enough buttons to do" the game justice. Kasavin also said that the PS2 pad was "especially well suited for the game". SSX 3's sound and voice acting were widely praised, with Silverman commending the "varied soundtrack and great effects", stating that they make the game "sound terrific". Perry commented that SSX 3 is "a legitimate THX endorsed game, ensuring high-quality sound clarity". Williams thought highly of the voice acting, calling it "clear, simple, and not annoying in the slightest". He also considered the DJ commentary to be slick and unobtrusive. Kasavin praised the soundtrack, calling it "one of the highlights of the experience", and gave recognition to the way it layers in with the racing, saying that "it contributes heavily to the intensity and excitement of playing SSX 3".

Non-video game publications sang the praises of the game. Noah Robischon of Entertainment Weekly gave the PS2 version an A and said that all of the smooth music, "along with the 'Uber' and 'Super Uber' combo tricks, will have you stumbling away from the console at 4 a.m., your fingers aching and your voice hoarse." Playboy gave the GC, PS2, and Xbox versions a score of 100% and said: "While other snowboarding games run out of steam mid-shred, the SSX series continues to gain momentum." The Game Boy Advance (GBA) version of SSX 3 was more poorly received, gaining a score of 63 out of 100 based on 14 reviews on Metacritic, indicating mixed or average reviews. On GameRankings, the GBA version received a score of 57% based on 12 reviews. A review by Computer and Video Games called the game slow and sluggish, and its controls unresponsive. Craig Harris of IGN said that the graphics engine has difficulty "keeping up with all that the designers throw at it". In a more positive review, Frank Provo of GameSpot wrote that it "duplicates many of the same features found in the console versions", stating that the game's 3D graphics engine is "unrivaled by anything else currently available for the system". Bedigian of GameZone said that this version was "not even close to the exciting console versions".

The Academy of Interactive Arts & Sciences awarded SSX 3 with "Console Action Sports Game of the Year" and "Outstanding Achievement in Licensed Soundtrack" during the 7th Annual Interactive Achievement Awards; it also received nominations for "Game of the Year", "Console Game of the Year", "Outstanding Innovation in Console Gaming", and "Outstanding Achievement in Visual Engineering".

By July 2006, its PS2 version had sold 750,000 copies and earned $28 million in the United States. It was the first game in the SSX series to sell 1 million copies. Next Generation ranked it as the 83rd highest-selling game launched for the PS2, Xbox, or GC between January 2000 and July 2006 in that country. Combined sales of the SSX series reached 3 million units in the United States by July 2006. SSX 3's PS2 version also received a Gold sales award from the ELSPA, indicating sales of at least 200,000 copies in the United Kingdom.
