= List of WWE video games =

This is a list of professional wrestling video games and game series based on the American professional wrestling promotion WWE (World Wrestling Entertainment), formerly known as World Wrestling Federation (WWF).

By 1994, WWF video games had sold 3,491,127 units and grossed $110,115,043 in North America. As of 2023, WWE and WWF video games sold 98 million units worldwide, making it the best-selling combat sports video game franchise.

== List of WWE video games ==
=== Primary video games ===
1. MicroLeague Wrestling [1987] (Commodore 64, Amiga)
2. WWF WrestleMania [1989] (NES)
3. WWF WrestleMania Challenge [1990] (NES)
4. WWF WrestleMania [1991] (Amstrad CPC, Amiga, Commodore 64, ZX Spectrum, Atari ST, Personal Computer/PC)
5. WWF Super WrestleMania [1992] (SNES, Mega Drive/Genesis)
6. WWF WrestleMania: Steel Cage Challenge [1992] (Master System, Game Gear, NES)
7. WWF Royal Rumble [1993] (SNES, Mega Drive/Genesis)
8. WWF King of the Ring [1993] (Game Boy, NES)
9. WWF Raw [1994] (32X, Mega Drive/Genesis, Game Boy, Game Gear, SNES)
10. WWF WrestleMania: The Arcade Game [1995] (Arcade, 32X, Mega Drive/Genesis, MS-DOS, PlayStation, Saturn, SNES)
11. WWF In Your House [1996] (Personal Computer/PC, PlayStation, Saturn, MS-DOS)
12. WWF War Zone [1998] (Game Boy, PlayStation, Nintendo 64)
13. WWF Attitude [1999] (Game Boy Color, Nintendo 64, PlayStation, Dreamcast)
14. WWF SmackDown! [2000] (PlayStation)
15. WWF SmackDown! 2: Know Your Role [2000] (PlayStation)
16. WWF SmackDown! Just Bring It [2001] (PlayStation 2)
17. WWE SmackDown! Shut Your Mouth [2002] (PlayStation 2)
18. WWE SmackDown! Here Comes the Pain [2003] (PlayStation 2)
19. WWE SmackDown! vs. Raw [2004] (PlayStation 2)
20. WWE SmackDown! vs. Raw 2006 [2005] (PlayStation 2, PlayStation Portable)
21. WWE SmackDown vs. Raw 2007 [2006] (Xbox 360, PlayStation 2, PlayStation Portable)
22. WWE SmackDown vs. Raw 2008 [2007] (PlayStation 2, PlayStation 3, PlayStation Portable, Nintendo DS, Wii, Xbox 360, Mobile)
23. WWE SmackDown vs. Raw 2009 [2008] (PlayStation 2, PlayStation 3, PlayStation Portable, Nintendo DS, Wii, Xbox 360, Mobile)
24. WWE SmackDown vs. Raw 2010 [2009] (PlayStation 2, PlayStation 3, PlayStation Portable, Nintendo DS, Wii, Xbox 360, IOS)
25. WWE SmackDown vs. Raw 2011 [2010] (PlayStation 2, PlayStation 3, PlayStation Portable, Wii, Xbox 360)
26. WWE '12 [2011] (PlayStation 3, Wii, Xbox 360)
27. WWE '13 [2012] (PlayStation 3, Wii, Xbox 360)
28. WWE 2K14 [2013] (PlayStation 3, Xbox 360)
29. WWE 2K15 [2014] (PlayStation 3, Xbox 360, PlayStation 4, Xbox One, Personal Computer/PC, Android, iOS)
30. WWE 2K16 [2015] (PlayStation 3, Xbox 360, PlayStation 4, Xbox One, Personal Computer/PC)
31. WWE 2K17 [2016] (PlayStation 3, Xbox 360, PlayStation 4, Xbox One, Personal Computer/PC)
32. WWE 2K18 [2017] (PlayStation 4, Xbox One, Nintendo Switch, Personal Computer/PC)
33. WWE 2K19 [2018] (PlayStation 4, Xbox One, Personal Computer/PC)
34. WWE 2K20 [2019] (PlayStation 4, Xbox One, Personal Computer/PC)
35. WWE 2K22 [2022] (PlayStation 4, Xbox One, PlayStation 5, Xbox Series X/S, Personal Computer/PC)
36. WWE 2K23 [2023] (PlayStation 4, Xbox One, PlayStation 5, Xbox Series X/S, Personal Computer/PC)
37. WWE 2K24 [2024] (PlayStation 4, Xbox One, PlayStation 5, Xbox Series X/S, Personal Computer/PC)
38. WWE 2K25 [2025] (PlayStation 4, Xbox One, PlayStation 5, Xbox Series X/S, Nintendo Switch 2, Personal Computer/PC, Android)
39. WWE 2K26 [2026] (PlayStation 5, Xbox Series X/S, Nintendo Switch 2, Personal Computer/PC)

=== Secondary video games ===
1. WWF European Rampage Tour [1992] (Amiga, Atari ST, Personal Computer/PC, Commodore 64)
2. WWF Rage in the Cage [1993] (Sega CD)
3. WWF WrestleMania 2000 [1999] (Nintendo 64, Game Boy Color)
4. WWF Royal Rumble [2000] (Arcade, Dreamcast)
5. WWF No Mercy [2000] (Nintendo 64)
6. WWF Raw [2002] (Personal Computer/PC, Xbox)
7. WWE WrestleMania X8 [2002] (GameCube)
8. WWE Raw 2 [2003] (Xbox)
9. WWE WrestleMania XIX [2003] (GameCube)
10. WWE Day of Reckoning [2004] (GameCube)
11. WWE WrestleMania 21 [2005] (Xbox)
12. WWE Day of Reckoning 2 [2005] (GameCube)
13. WWE Legends of WrestleMania [2009] (PlayStation 3, Xbox 360, IOS)
14. WWE All Stars [2011] (PlayStation 2, PlayStation 3, PlayStation Portable, Wii, Nintendo 3DS, Xbox 360)
15. WWE 2K Battlegrounds [2020] (PlayStation 4, Xbox One, Nintendo Switch, Personal Computer/PC)

=== Handheld-exclusive video games ===
1. WWF Superstars [1991] (Game Boy)
2. WWF Superstars 2 [1992] (Game Boy)
3. WWF Betrayal [2001] (Game Boy Color)
4. WWF Road to WrestleMania [2001] (Game Boy Advance)
5. WWE Road to WrestleMania X8 [2002] (Game Boy Advance)
6. WWE Survivor Series [2004] (Game Boy Advance)
7. WWE Aftershock [2005] (N-Gage)

=== Arcade-exclusive video games ===
1. WWF Superstars [1989] (Arcade)
2. WWF WrestleFest [1991] (Arcade)

=== Mobile/tablet-exclusive video games ===
1. WWF Mobile Madness [2002] (Mobile)
2. WWE Mobile Madness Hardcore [2003] (Mobile)
3. WWE Mobile Madness: Cage [2003] (Mobile)
4. WWE Raw [2005] (Mobile)
5. WWE Smackdown [2005] (Mobile)
6. WWE Superstar Slingshot [2011] (Mobile)
7. Apptivity WWE Rumblers [2012] (iPad)
8. WWE WrestleFest [2012] (iPad)
9. WWE Presents: John Cena's Fast Lane [2013] (iOS, Android)
10. WWE Presents: RockPocalypse [2013] (iOS, Android)
11. WWE SuperCard [2014] (iOS, Android)
12. WWE 2K [2015] (iOS, Android)
13. WWE Immortals [2015] (iOS, Android)
14. WWE Champions [2017] (iOS, Android)
15. WWE Tap Mania [2017] (iOS, Android)
16. WWE Mayhem [2017] (iOS, Android)
17. WWE Universe [2019] (iOS, Android)
18. The King of Fighters All Star [2020] (iOS, Android)
19. WWE Racing Showdown [2020] (Android)
20. WWE Champions 2021 [2021] (iOS, Android)
21. WWE Undefeated [2021] (iOS, Android)
22. WWE 2K25: Netflix Edition [2026] (Mobile)
23. WWE Generations : Eras Collide [2026] (iOS, Android)

=== Other video games ===
1. WWF With Authority! [2001] (Microsoft Windows)
2. WWE Crush Hour [2003] (PlayStation 2, GameCube)
3. WWE Plug N' Play [2005]

== See also ==
- List of fighting games
- List of licensed professional wrestling video games
- List of wrestling video games
