= Hulk Hogan filmography =

List of performances

During his lifetime, Hulk Hogan appeared in a wide range of visual media.

== Films ==
Year	Title	Role	Notes	Ref
1982	Rocky III	Thunderlips		
1989	No Holds Barred	Rip Thomas		
1990	Gremlins 2: The New Batch	Himself	Cameo	
1991	Suburban Commando	Shep Ramsey		
1993	Mr. Nanny	Sean Armstrong		
1996	Spy Hard	Steele's other Tag-Team Member	Cameo	
1996	The Secret Agent Club	Ray Chase		
1996	Santa with Muscles	Blake Thorn		
1998	McCinsey's Island	Joe McGrai		
1998	3 Ninjas: High Noon at Mega Mountain	Dave Dragon		
1998	The Ultimate Weapon	Ben Cutter		
1999	Muppets from Space	Himself	Cameo	
2009	Little Hercules	Zeus		
2011	Gnomeo & Juliet	Terrafirminator V.O.	Voice	

== Television ==
Year	Title	Role	Notes
1984	Goldie and the Bears	Mac McKenna	TV film
1985–1986	The A-Team	Himself	2 episodes: ("Body Slam", "The Trouble with Harry")
1985–1986	Hulk Hogan's Rock 'n' Wrestling	Himself	Live-action parts only
1986	The Love Boat	Himself	1 episode ("Miss Mom/Who's the Champ/Gopher's Delusion")
1994	Thunder in Paradise	Randolph J. "Hurricane" Spencer	Main role; 22 episodes
1995	Space Ghost Coast to Coast	Himself	1 episode ("Sleeper")
1996	Baywatch	Himself	1 episode: ("Bash at the Beach")
1997	Assault on Devil's Island	Mike McBride	TV film
1999	Suddenly Susan	Himself	2 episodes ("In This Corner... Susan Keane!: Part 1" & "In This Corner... Susan Keane!: Part 2")
1999	Assault on Death Mountain	Mike McBride	TV film
2001	Walker, Texas Ranger	Boomer Knight	1 episode: ("Division Street")
2005–2007	Hogan Knows Best	Himself	Reality TV series
2006–2016	Robot Chicken	Himself, Abraham Lincoln, The Giving Tree, Bigfoot, Various	4 episodes
2008	Hulk Hogan's Celebrity Championship Wrestling	Himself	Reality TV series
2008–2009	Brooke Knows Best	Himself	Reality TV series
2011–2015	China, IL	The Dean	Main cast
2012	American Dad!	Himself	1 episode: ("Stanny Tendergrass")
2012	The Inbetweeners	Himself	1 episode ("Fire!")
2014	The '80s Called	Himself	RadioShack commercial for Super Bowl XLVIII
2015	Smosh	Himself	1 episode
2019	The Goldbergs	Himself	1 episode ("WrestleMania")
2022	Camp WWE	Himself	2 episodes ("John Cena's Grounded", "Vince's Pizza Party")

== Video games ==
Hulk Hogan and Hollywood Hogan are featured in the following licensed wrestling video games:

=== WWE ===
Year	Title	Notes
1987	MicroLeague Wrestling	Video game debut Cover athlete
1989	WWF WrestleMania	Cover athlete
1989	WWF Superstars	Cover athlete
1990	WWF WrestleMania Challenge	Cover athlete
1991	WWF WrestleMania	Cover athlete
1991	WWF WrestleFest	Cover athlete
1992	WWF Super WrestleMania	Cover athlete
1992	WWF European Rampage Tour	
1992	WWF Superstars 2	Cover athlete
1992	WWF WrestleMania: Steel Cage Challenge	Cover athlete
1993	WWF Royal Rumble	Hogan was featured in the Sega Genesis version of the game (of which he was also on the cover), but was not in the SNES version
1993	WWF King of the Ring	Cover athlete
2002	WWF WrestleMania X8	Cover athlete
2002	WWE Road to WrestleMania X8	
2002	WWE SmackDown! Shut Your Mouth	Hogan was on the cover of the PAL version of the game, but not the NTSC version
2003	WWE Crush Hour	
2003	WWE WrestleMania XIX	
2003	WWE Raw 2	
2005	WWE Day of Reckoning 2	
2005	WWE SmackDown! vs. RAW 2006	
2006	WWE SmackDown vs. Raw 2007	
2009	WWE Legends of WrestleMania	Cover athlete
2011	WWE All Stars	Cover athlete
2013	WWE 2K14	
2014	WWE SuperCard	
2014	WWE 2K15	Cover athlete on the Hulkamania edition of the game; Hogan was downloadable content and removed after his racial scandal
2015	WWE Immortals	
2017	WWE Champions	Added in 2019
2019	WWE 2K20	
2020	WWE 2K Battlegrounds	
2022	WWE 2K22	Cover athlete on the nWo 4-Life edition of the game
2023	WWE 2K23	
2024	WWE 2K24	Cover athlete on the 40 Years of WrestleMania edition of the game
2025	WWE 2K25	
2026	WWE 2K26	Posthumous release

=== WCW ===
Year	Title	Notes
1997	WCW vs. the World	Cover athlete
1997	WCW vs. nWo: World Tour	Cover athlete
1998	WCW Nitro	Cover athlete
1998	WCW/nWo Revenge	Cover athlete
1999	WCW/nWo Thunder	Cover athlete
1999	WCW Mayhem	
2000	WCW Backstage Assault	

=== TNA ===
Year	Title	Notes
2010	TNA Impact! Cross the Line	Hogan was featured in the Nintendo DS version of the game (of which he was also on the cover), but was not in the PSP version
2011	TNA Wrestling Impact!	

=== Legends of Wrestling ===
Year	Title	Notes
2001	Legends of Wrestling	Cover athlete
2002	Legends of Wrestling II	Cover athlete
2004	Showdown: Legends of Wrestling	Cover athlete

=== Other ===
Year	Title	Role
1995	Thunder in Paradise	Randolph J. "Hurricane" Spencer
1998	Monster Truck Madness 2	Hollywood Hulk Hogan
2011	Hulk Hogan's Main Event	Hulk Hogan
