= WWF WrestleMania =

WWF WrestleMania may refer to:

- WrestleMania, World Wrestling Entertainment's annual pay-per-view event WrestleMania
  - WrestleMania I, the first event of the said series
- WWF WrestleMania (1989 video game), a 1989 video game for the NES
- WWF WrestleMania (1991 video game), a 1991 computer video game released by Ocean Software
- WWF WrestleMania: The Arcade Game, a 1995 video game released by Midway Games
- WWF WrestleMania 2000, a 1999 video game for the Nintendo 64

== See also ==
- WWF Super WrestleMania
