= Big Boss Man =

American professional wrestler (1963–2004)

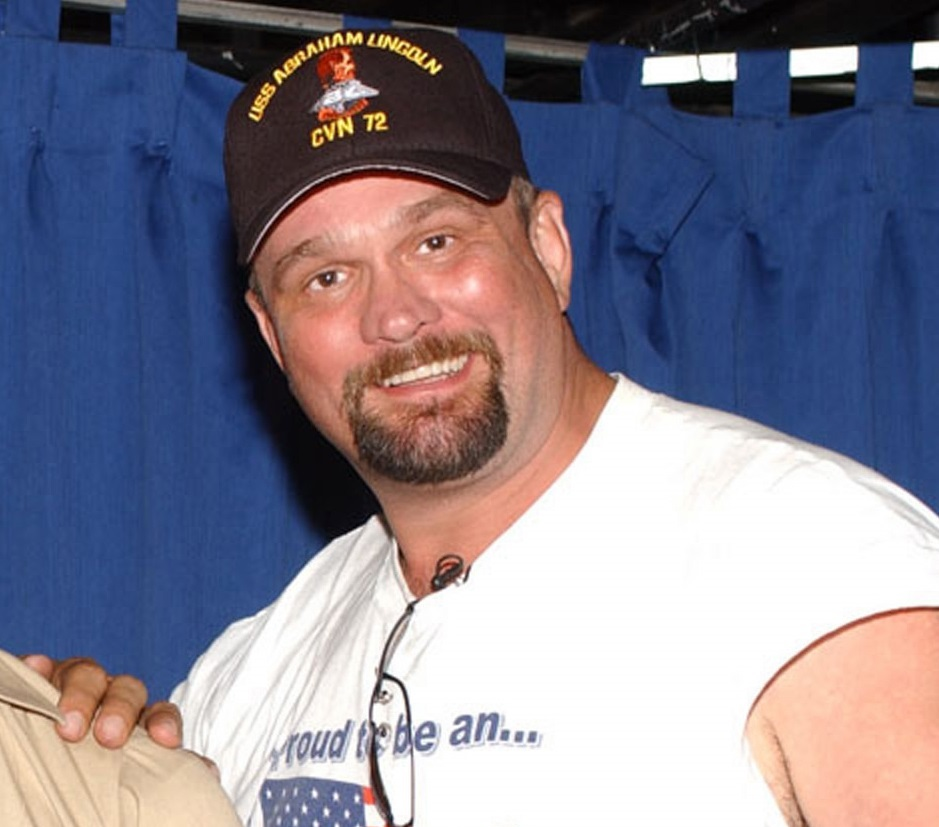
- Traylor in 2002

Personal information
- Born: Ray Washington Traylor Jr. May 2, 1963 Marietta, Georgia, U.S.
- Died: September 22, 2004 (aged 41) Dallas, Georgia, U.S.
- Cause of death: Heart Attack
- Spouse: Angela Traylor (m. 1989)
- Children: 2

Professional wrestling career
- Ring name(s): (The) Big Boss Man; Boss Man; Big Bossman; The Man; Big Bubba; Big Bubba Rogers; The Boss; The Guardian Angel; Ray Traylor; War Machine
- Billed height: 6 ft 7 in (201 cm)
- Billed weight: 330 lb (150 kg)
- Billed from: Cobb County, Georgia
- Trained by: Ted Allen
- Debut: 1984

Ray Washington Traylor Jr. (May 2, 1963 – September 22, 2004) was an American professional wrestler best known for his appearances with the World Wrestling Federation (WWF) under the ring name (The) Big Boss Man, as well as for his appearances with World Championship Wrestling (WCW) as the Boss, the Man, the Guardian Angel, and Big Bubba Rogers. During his appearances with the WWF, Big Boss Man held the WWF World Tag Team Championship once and the WWF Hardcore Championship four times. Traylor was posthumously inducted into the WWE Hall of Fame in 2016.

== Early life ==
Ray Washington Traylor Jr. was born on May 2, 1963, in Marietta, Georgia. He attended Paulding County High School where he graduated in 1982. Later, Traylor then worked as a corrections officer from the Department of Corrections in Cobb County, Georgia. Traylor would later use his corrections background to create his character of The Big Boss Man.

== Professional wrestling career ==
=== Early career (1984–1988) ===
After his career as a correctional officer, Traylor then transitioned into professional wrestling where he debuted in 1984 then began working as a jobber for Jim Crockett Promotions. Head booker Dusty Rhodes took notice of Traylor's potential (particularly after seeing him take Tully Blanchard's slingshot suplex finisher despite being 6'6 and over 350 lbs) and took him off television for three months before repackaging him as Big Bubba Rogers. He received a push as the silent heel bodyguard for Jim Cornette, who, along with The Midnight Express, was feuding with the James Boys (Rhodes and Magnum T. A., under masks). Rogers feuded with Rhodes (the top face at the time) in a series of Bunkhouse Stampede matches in 1986. He and Rhodes were tied for wins in this series, leading to a tiebreaking cage match, which Rhodes won on February 27.

In 1987, Traylor joined the Universal Wrestling Federation (UWF) after it was purchased by Jim Crockett. On April 19, Traylor won the UWF Heavyweight Championship from One Man Gang, who was leaving the UWF for the World Wrestling Federation. Following his title win, he aligned himself with General Skandor Akbar and his Devastation Inc. stable. Traylor lost the title to "Dr. Death" Steve Williams on July 11 during the Great American Bash tour. In the second WarGames match on July 30, Traylor, as War Machine, teamed with The Four Horsemen (Ric Flair, Arn Anderson, Lex Luger and Tully Blanchard) in a loss to The Road Warriors (Hawk and Animal), Nikita Koloff, Dusty Rhodes and Paul Ellering, when Animal forced the War Machine to submit by gouging his eyes with a spiked armband.

Traylor made his first tour to Japan in March to April 1988, wrestling for All Japan Pro Wrestling as "Big Bubba" as part of its Champion Carnival series. During the tour, he primarily teamed with Bruiser Brody, marking some of Brody's final matches before his sudden death in July 1988. His matches during the tour included defeating Shunji Takano in Tokyo's Nippon Budokan, wrestling John Tenta to a double count out in the Okayama Budokan in Okayama, and teaming with George Skaaland in a loss to The Great Kabuki and Shunji Takano in Tokyo's Korakuen Hall.

=== World Wrestling Federation (1988–1993) ===
==== Twin Towers (1988–1990) ====
In May 1988, Traylor joined the WWF as Big Boss Man, a heel character inspired by his previous career as a corrections officer. Managed by Slick, Boss Man's post-match routine often included handcuffing his defeated opponents to the ring ropes and beating them with a nightstick or ball and chain. On August 29, he defeated Koko B. Ware at the inaugural SummerSlam.

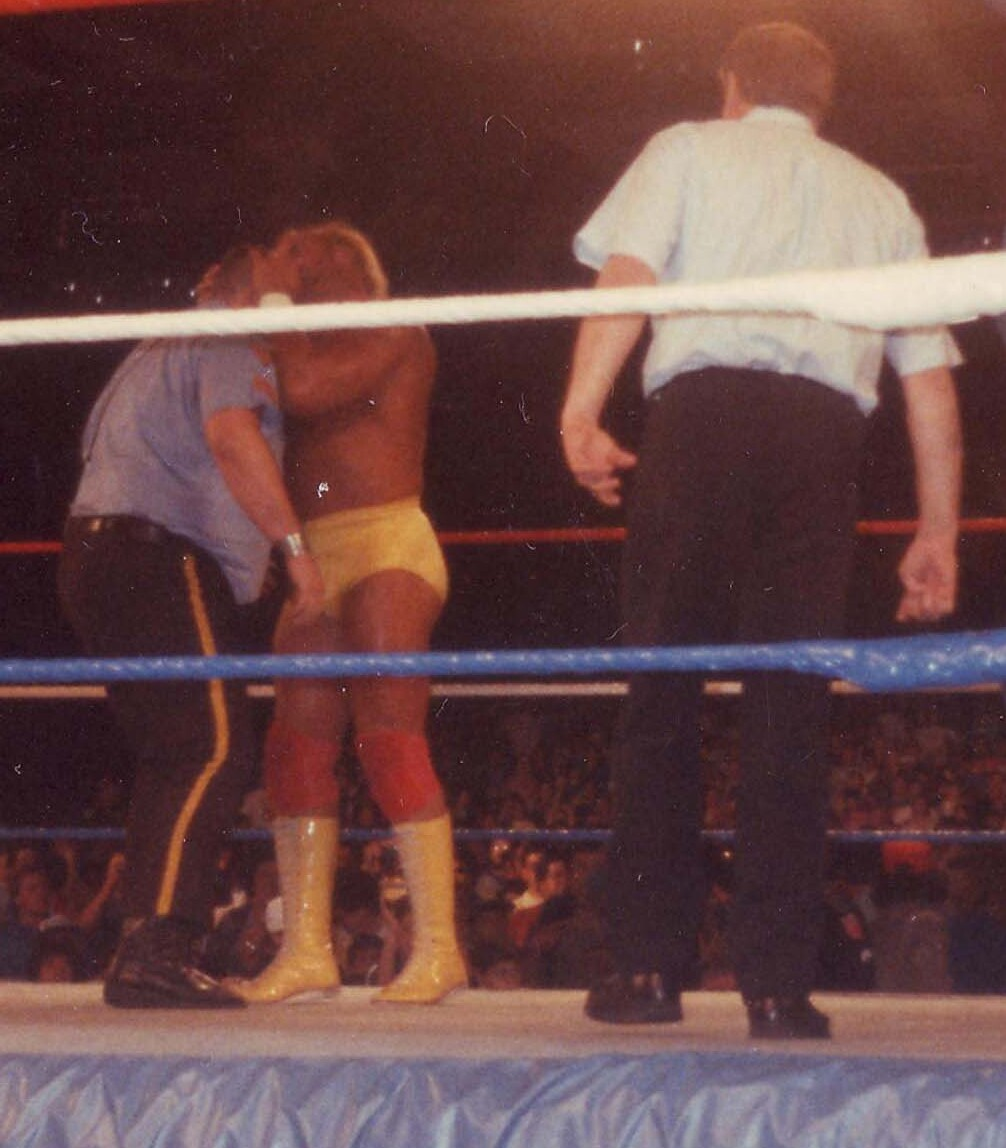
Big Boss Man (left) facing Hulk Hogan in March 1989

Big Boss Man began his first major WWF angle by attacking Hulk Hogan (who he was specifically brought in to the WWF to be an opponent for) in an October edition of "The Brother Love Show". He also formed a tag team with Akeem (formerly billed as One Man Gang) known as The Twin Towers. At Survivor Series on November 24, they teamed with Ted DiBiase, King Haku and The Red Rooster in a 5-on-5 Survivor Series match, but lost to The Mega Powers (Hulk Hogan and WWF Champion Randy Savage), Hercules, B. Ware and Hillbilly Jim. The Twin Towers were a key part in the top storyline of Savage turning on Hogan, leading to the WrestleMania V main event; in the later part of a tag match between the four on February 3, 1989, at The Main Event II, Hogan abandoned Savage to attend to the hurt Miss Elizabeth and went backstage. After being double-teamed for a while, Savage eventually rallied until Hogan returned to the match. After Savage tagged Hogan in, he slapped Hogan and left him to defeat The Twin Towers on his own, which led to The Mega Powers' demise as Savage beat Hulk in the backstage medical room where fellow wrestlers, managers and staff had to break them up.

At WrestleMania V on April 2, The Twin Towers defeated The Rockers (Shawn Michaels and Marty Jannetty). Meanwhile, Boss Man continued his feud with Hogan in a series of steel cage matches; in their most notable encounter on May 27 at Saturday Night's Main Event XXI, he failed to win the WWF Championship from Hogan. During the match, Hogan superplexed Boss Man off the top of the cage. The Twin Towers were then involved in a feud with Demolition (Ax and Smash) over the WWF Tag Team Championship. At SummerSlam on August 28, they teamed with André the Giant and lost to Demolition and King Duggan in a six-man tag team match. Boss Man subsequently feuded with Dusty Rhodes and led a team on November 23 at Survivor Series including Bad News Brown, Rick Martel and The Honky Tonk Man, but they lost to Rhodes, Brutus Beefcake, Red Rooster and Tito Santana.

==== Face turn and various feuds (1990–1993) ====
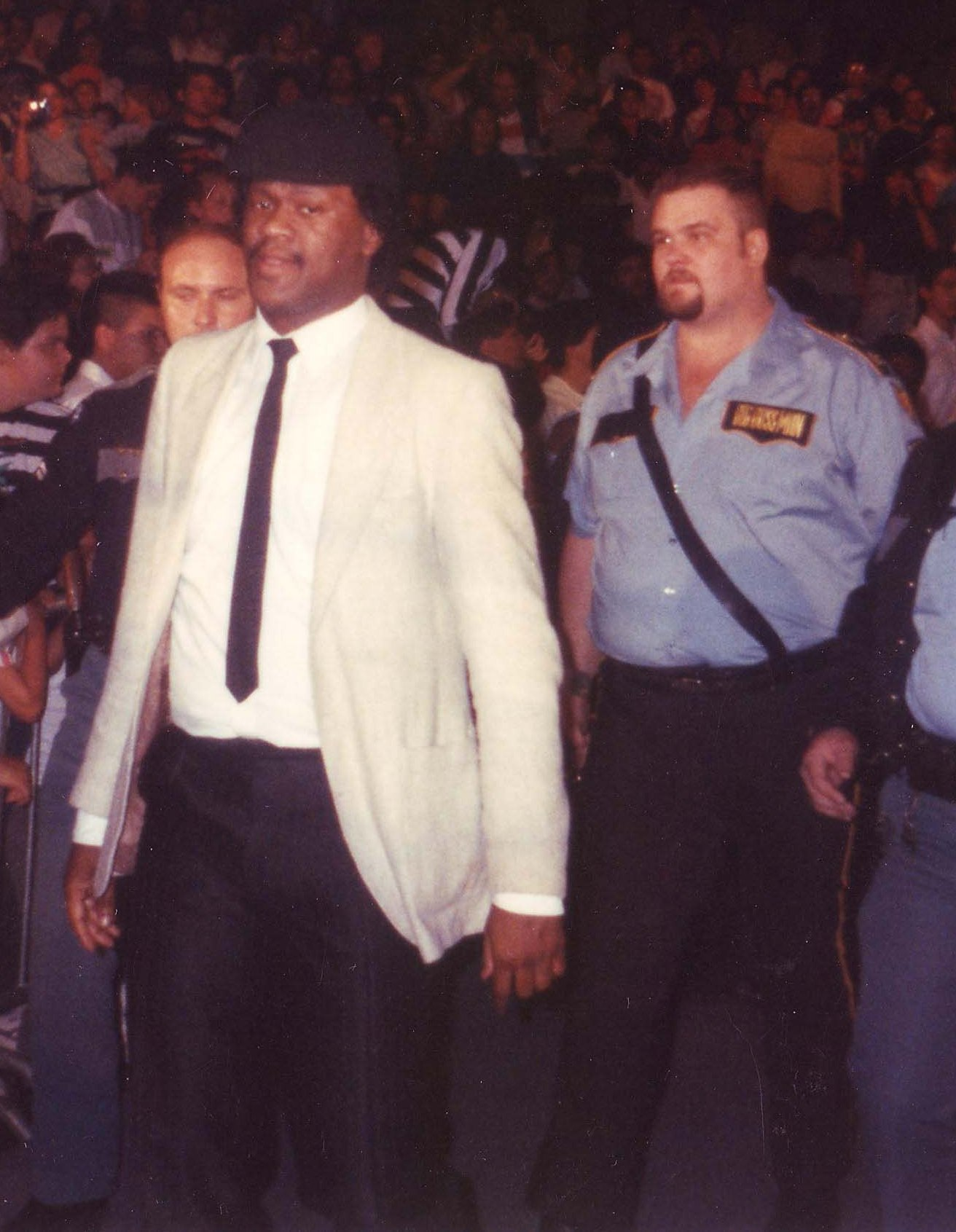
Boss Man (pictured in March 1989) became a fan favorite after refusing to do the bidding of his villainous manager Slick (left)

Big Boss Man turned face on the February 24, 1990 episode of Superstars, when DiBiase had paid Slick to have Boss Man retrieve the Million Dollar Championship belt from Jake Roberts, who had stolen it. Boss Man retrieved a bag containing both the belt and Roberts' pet python, Damien. On The Brother Love Show, he refused to accept DiBiase's money for the bag, and returned it to Roberts. Boss Man then defeated his former partner Akeem in less than two minutes on April 1 at WrestleMania VI. Later that month at the WWF/AJPW/NJPW Wrestling Summit in the Tokyo Dome in Tokyo, Japan, Boss Man lost to Jake "the Snake" Roberts.

At Survivor Series on November 22, he teamed with Hogan, Duggan and Tugboat to defeat Earthquake, Haku, Dino Bravo and The Barbarian. The entrance theme song "Hard Times" was performed by Survivor lead singer Jimi Jamison, written by Jimmy Hart, JJ Maguire, Mike Stock and Pete Waterman.

In the fall, Boss Man began feuding with Bobby Heenan and the Heenan Family after Heenan continually insulted Boss Man's mother. He defeated Heenan Family members The Barbarian on January 19, 1991, at Royal Rumble and Mr. Perfect on March 24 at WrestleMania VII in an Intercontinental Championship match via disqualification. Following this, he feuded with The Mountie to see who the real officer of the WWF was, culminating in a Jailhouse match at SummerSlam on August 26. Boss Man won the match, thus the Mountie had to spend a night in jail; this was the only such match ever held by the company. He also had an upset victory vs The Undertaker in November 16 via DQ.

In 1992, Boss Man had an 8-man tag team match at WrestleMania VIII teaming up with Virgil, Sgt. Slaughter, and Jim Duggan against the team of Brian Knobbs, Jerry Sags, Repo Man, and The Mountie which Boss Man won. He then began feuding with Nailz, an ex-convict character who, in a series of promos aired before his debut, claimed Boss Man had been his abusive officer in prison, and warned he was seeking revenge. On the May 30 episode of WWF Superstars, Nailz – clad in an orange prison jumpsuit – ran into the ring and attacked Boss Man, handcuffing him to the top rope and repeatedly choking and beating him with the nightstick. Boss Man took time off to sell his (kayfabe) injuries, eventually returning and having a series of matches with Nailz in the latter half of 1992. The feud culminated at Survivor Series on November 25, where Boss Man defeated Nailz in a Nightstick on a Pole match.

Boss Man's last major feud was against Bam Bam Bigelow, leading to a match at the Royal Rumble on January 24, 1993, which Boss Man lost. He left the WWF shortly after a house show in Gatineau, Quebec on March 14 defeating Doink the Clown and later made appearances in USWA, SMW, Australia and Japan. In December, he briefly returned to the WWF to serve as the special guest referee for three house show main events between Bret Hart and Jeff Jarrett.

=== All Japan Pro Wrestling (1993) ===
In July 1993, Traylor (as "Big Bubba") returned to All Japan Pro Wrestling (AJPW) as part of its "Summer Action Series". During the tour, he primarily competed in the tag team division, facing team such as the Super Generation Army, the Youngbloods, and the Holy Demon Army. On July 23, he wrestled on a memorial show for Bruiser Brody (who had been killed in Puerto Rico five years earlier), teaming with Johnny Smith in a loss to Steve Williams and Terry Gordy. In his final match of the tour, he lost to Akira Taue in Tokyo's Nippon Budokan.

In September to October 1993, Big Bubba returned to AJPW as part of its "Giant Series". His matches included teaming with Steve Williams to defeat Danny Spivey and Johnny Ace in the Nippon Budokan and teaming with Stan Hansen to defeat the Super Generation Army in Tokyo's Korakuen Hall.

Big Bubba returned to AJPW for his third tour of the year in November to December 1993 as part of its World Tag League for the vacant World Tag Team Championship, entering the round-robin tournament with Steve Williams as his partner. Bubba and Williams placed fourth in the tournament with eight points. His matches during the tour included teaming with Williams in a loss to Giant Baba and Stan Hansen in the Nippon Budokan.

=== World Championship Wrestling (1993–1998) ===
==== The Boss / The Guardian Angel (1993–1995) ====
Traylor made his debut for World Championship Wrestling (WCW) as The Boss on the December 18, 1993 episode of WCW Saturday Night, pinning WCW International World Heavyweight Champion Rick Rude in a non-title match. He challenged for Rude's title at Starrcade '93: 10th Anniversary on December 27, but was unsuccessful.

In 1994, Traylor began a lengthy feud with Big Van Vader, losing to him on April 17 at Spring Stampede. In light of legal complaints from the WWF regarding the similarity of "The Boss" to "Big Boss Man", Traylor was renamed The Guardian Angel and sported similar attire to those in the organization he was named after. He subsequently lost to Vader at Bash at the Beach on July 17, Fall Brawl on September 18, and Halloween Havoc on October 23 to end their feud.

==== Various feuds (1995–1996) ====
In early 1995, Traylor turned heel and again became known as Big Bubba Rogers, defeating Sting at Uncensored on March 19 but lost in a rematch at Slamboree '95: A Legends' Reunion on May 21. On September 4, Rogers challenged Hulk Hogan for the WCW World Heavyweight Championship on the debut episode of WCW Monday Nitro, but failed to win the title.

==== Dungeon of Doom (1996) ====
In 1996, Rogers joined the Dungeon of Doom and feuded with former Dungeon of Doom member John Tenta, whom he lost to at The Great American Bash on June 16 and Bash at the Beach on July 7.

==== New World Order (1996–1997) ====
On the December 16, 1996 episode of WCW Monday Nitro, Rogers defected from the Dungeon of Doom to join the New World Order (nWo), attacking the Faces of Fear during a bout against the Outsiders. He subsequently began feuding with the Dungeon of Doom, facing Dungeon member Konnan in a series of matches including a strap match and a chain match. On January 25, 1997, at Souled Out, he defeated Dungeon member Hugh Morrus in a Mexican deathmatch by running Morrus over with a motorcycle at ringside.

Rogers' tenure in the nWo abruptly ended when he was knocked out by an unknown assailant at the start of the February 17, 1997 edition of Nitro. He later explained that Eric Bischoff fired him from the nWo while he was temporarily paralyzed.

==== Feud with the New World Order (1997–1998) ====
Upon his return in September 1997, Traylor resumed wrestling under his real name and began feuding with the nWo, forming an alliance with The Steiner Brothers, who also sought Ted DiBiase as their manager. The union abruptly ended when Scott Steiner turned on them to join the nWo in February 1998. After Traylor lost to Goldberg on the March 30 episode of Nitro, he left WCW the following month.

=== Return to the World Wrestling Federation / World Wrestling Entertainment (1998–2003) ===
==== Hardcore and Tag Team Champion (1998–1999) ====
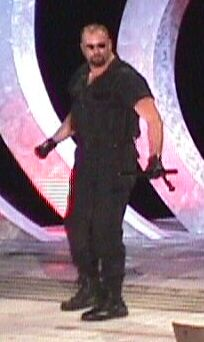
Big Boss Man on SmackDown! in October 1999

Traylor rejoined the WWF shortly after, again as Big Boss Man. On October 12, 1998, he returned to television with a new look, abandoning his blue police shirt for an all-black SWAT-style uniform, including a tactical vest and gloves. He served as Vince McMahon's bodyguard during his feuds with Stone Cold Steve Austin and D-Generation X (DX) and was one of the first members of his heel stable, The Corporation, briefly wearing a mask before he revealed his identity.

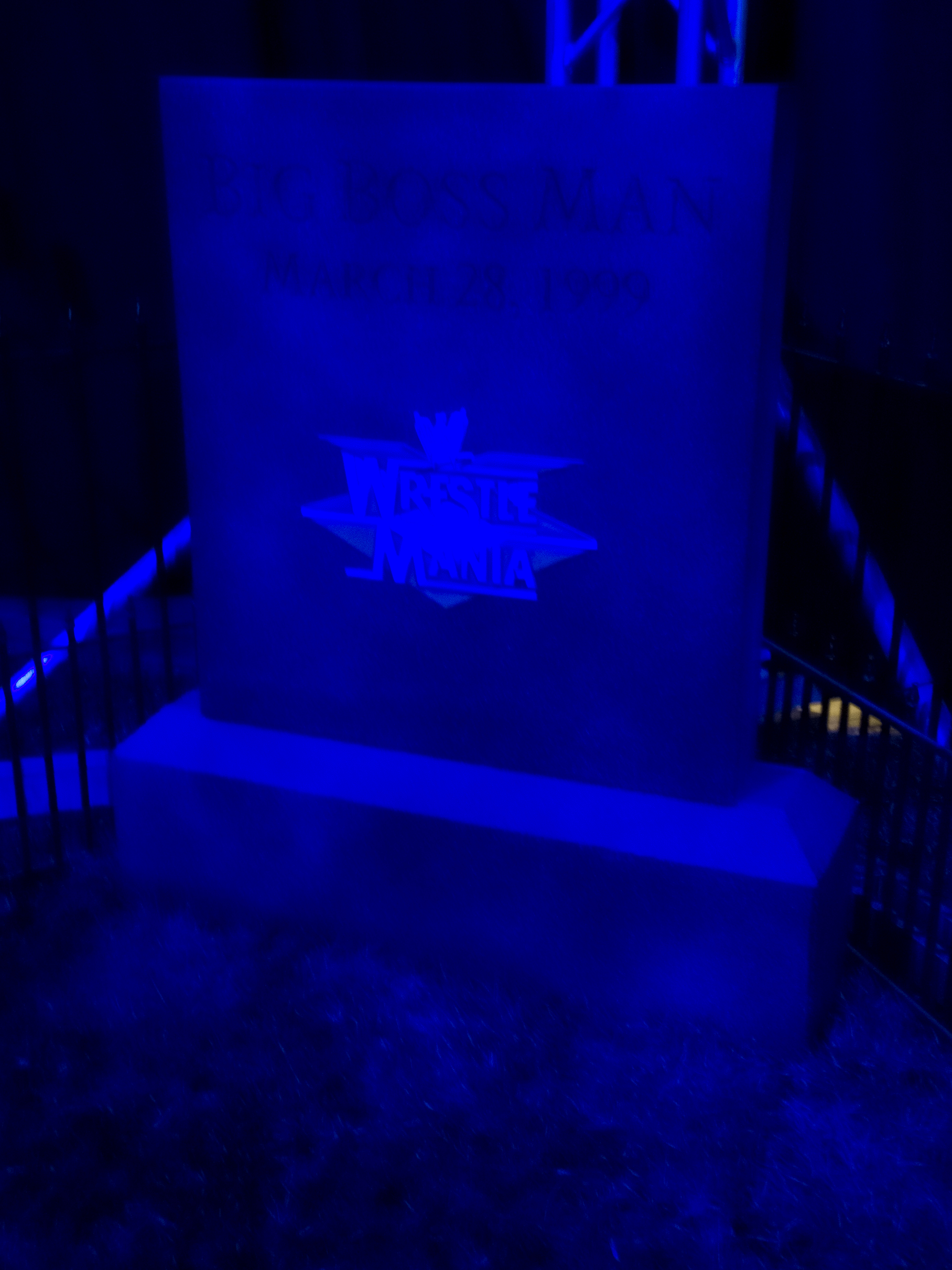
A tombstone commemorating Big Boss Man's loss at WrestleMania XV

On the November 30 episode of Raw is War, Big Boss Man defeated Mankind to win the WWF Hardcore Championship after assistance from The Rock. Boss Man and Shamrock were initially defeated by WWF Tag Team Champions the New Age Outlaws at Rock Bottom: In Your House on December 13, however, on the following day's Raw is War broadcast, they won the WWF Tag Team Championship in a rematch, making Boss Man a double champion. He lost the Hardcore Championship to New Age Outlaws member Road Dogg nearly two weeks later, but defeated him in a non-title rematch at Royal Rumble on January 24, 1999. In that same Pay-Per-View, he entered the 1999 Royal Rumble at number 22, He eliminated X-Pac and D'Lo Brown, before being eliminated by "Stone Cold" Steve Austin; Boss Man was the penultimate elimination.

Boss Man and Shamrock lost the WWF Tag Team Championship to Owen Hart and Jeff Jarrett the next night on Raw is War. In March 8, The Undertaker brought The Boss Man to the ring alongside the rest of The Ministry to sacrifice The Boss Man, they did that by tying his arms and legs to a symbol, Boss Man managed to break free from the symbol before crashing down to the ground and The Ministry asssulting him, then The Corporation came to help Big Boss Man, in the end Undertaker was arrested and the symbol was lit on fire by Undertaker (like how Kane does it) . At WrestleMania XV on March 28, Big Boss Man lost his first and only WrestleMania match loss to The Undertaker in a Hell in a Cell match. After the match, The Undertaker hanged him from the roof of the cage (an illusion made possible by a full-body safety harness concealed under Big Boss Man's outfit). While a video package of the WrestleMania Rage Party was then shown, Big Boss Man had to be safely taken down onto a stretcher so that he could get to a hospital with only minor injuries. At Over the Edge on May 23, Boss Man was a part of The Corporate Ministry (The Corporation and The Ministry Of Darkness united), losing to The Union in an eight-man elimination tag team match. Big Boss Man also competed to qualify for King of the Ring against X-Pac and lost from a rollup.

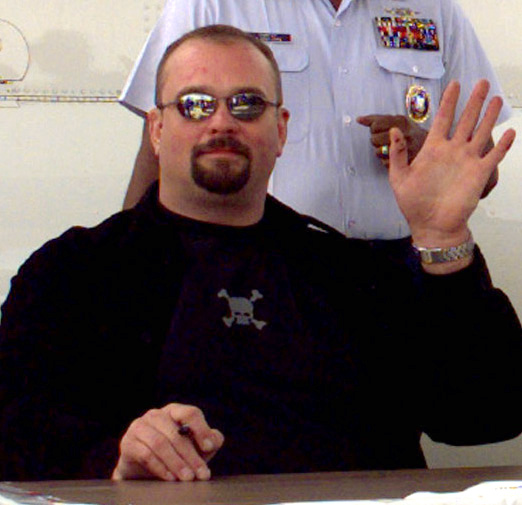
Traylor at an autograph session in May 1999

Big Boss Man subsequently entered a major feud with Al Snow, which eventually involved Snow's pet chihuahua, Pepper. He won the WWF Hardcore Championship from Snow on July 25 at Fully Loaded. At SummerSlam on August 22, the two had a Falls Count Anywhere match that spilled into the backstage area, the street and, finally, into a nearby bar. Prior to the match, Snow had set Pepper's pet carrier near the entrance way; minutes into the match, Boss Man picked it up, taunted Pepper, struck Snow with the carrier, and carelessly tossed it behind him. Commentator Jim Ross immediately apologized to viewers for the act and stated that Pepper had been removed from the box before the match. Snow won the match and regained the WWF Hardcore Championship. Boss Man regained the championship on the subsequent episode of SmackDown!. Two weeks later, Big Boss Man kidnapped and ransomed Pepper, arranging a meeting in which he fed Snow a meat dish supposedly made from Pepper's remains. On the same night, Big Boss Man lost the Hardcore Championship to the returning British Bulldog, who then gifted the title to Snow. Boss Man and Snow settled their feud in a Kennel from Hell match for the title at Unforgiven on September 26, in which a blue solid steel cage surrounded the ring itself and the ringside was surrounded by a chain-link fenced "cell". The objective of the match was to escape from the cage and the cell while avoiding "attack dogs" (which turned out to be disappointingly docile and was the worst rated match of 1999) positioned outside the ring. Boss Man ultimately lost the match, but won back the title in a triple threat match involving Snow and Big Show nearly two weeks later, that title reign ended up being for a total of 97 days, making him have the longest hardcore title reign ever.

The WWF Hardcore Champion, Big Boss Man feuded with Big Show over the WWF Championship in October (which was the worst rated feud of 1999 and one of Boss Man's biggest feuds ever); during the feud, Big Boss Man admitted he pulled the plug on his cancer-stricken father, broke his family's heritage loom, and hit Show with a hammer. He also showed up at Big Show's father's funeral and made some disrespectful remarks such as asking Big Show's mother to go out with him, then drove Big Show over with his bluesmobile, afterwards chaining the casket to the back of his car and driving off. Big Show attempted to save the coffin by jumping on it, riding it for a few yards before losing his grip and tumbling off. Boss Man and Prince Albert trapped Big show in a room (he was doing an interview) and threw a tear gas and locked the door. On the November 15, 1999 episode of Raw is War, Big Boss Man semi cleanly (arguably cleanly) beat The Rock after assist from Prince Albert who broke up a pin from The Rock, Prince Albert tried to hit Rock with a steel chair but missed and hit The Big Boss Man, he also tried to break up another pin but Rock dodged and Albert accidentally hit Boss Man again, then Rock proceeded to hit Albert, that distraction gave Boss Man enough time to recover and hit Rock with a sidewalk slam to win the match, making this the biggest win in Boss Man's career to become the number one contender for the WWF Championship. Rock wasn't happy he lost and went ahead to assault and bust Boss Man and Albert open with several weapons, mainly using a steel chain. Boss Man assaulted Big Show again in the ring with a nightstick, and after a match between Big Show vs Viscera, Boss Man appeared on the titantron with his mother, Boss Man managed to get his mother to tell him Big Show is a bastard, Boss Man then exposed a hidden camera without her knowing (indicating that she publicly said to everyone that Big Show is a bastard). Big Boss Man then met the Big Show at Armageddon on December 12, in the match, The Big Show was releasing all his tension on Boss Man, and choke-slammed Prince Albert who tried to intervene to help Boss Man through the Spanish announce table, then Boss Man hit Show with the steel steps, and into the ring-post, Big Show did an impressive kick up at 500lbs, before hitting him with a choke-slam and pinning him to retain the title. That match made it in the HOF showcase mode in WWE 2K18. They met again for the title in a handicap match with Prince Albert on the following episode of Raw is War and Show pinned Boss Man to retain the title again, ending their feud.

==== Various tag teams and departure (2000–2003) ====
The alliance between Boss Man and Albert ended after they lost to the Hardy Boyz on the January 13, 2000 episode of SmackDown!. The following week, Boss Man lost the WWF Hardcore Championship to Test. He entered the Royal Rumble match at the titular event on January 23 at number 9, during his entrance, he avoided entering the ring against Rikishi who was eliminating everyone before he came out, to smartly waste the 90 seconds for a new entry to not be eliminated early in the rumble, he eliminated Rikishi, Chyna and Faarooq before being eliminated by The Rock. At No Way Out on February 27, Boss Man lost to Taz via disqualification. On the March 19 episode of Sunday Night Heat, he introduced Bull Buchanan as his protégé. They teamed to defeat The Godfather and D'Lo Brown at WrestleMania 2000 on April 2 and the Acolytes Protection Agency on April 30 at Backlash. On the June 5 episode of Raw is War, after losing to the Hardy Boyz and subsequently arguing, Boss Man knocked Buchanan out with his nightstick when his back was turned and the team split up.

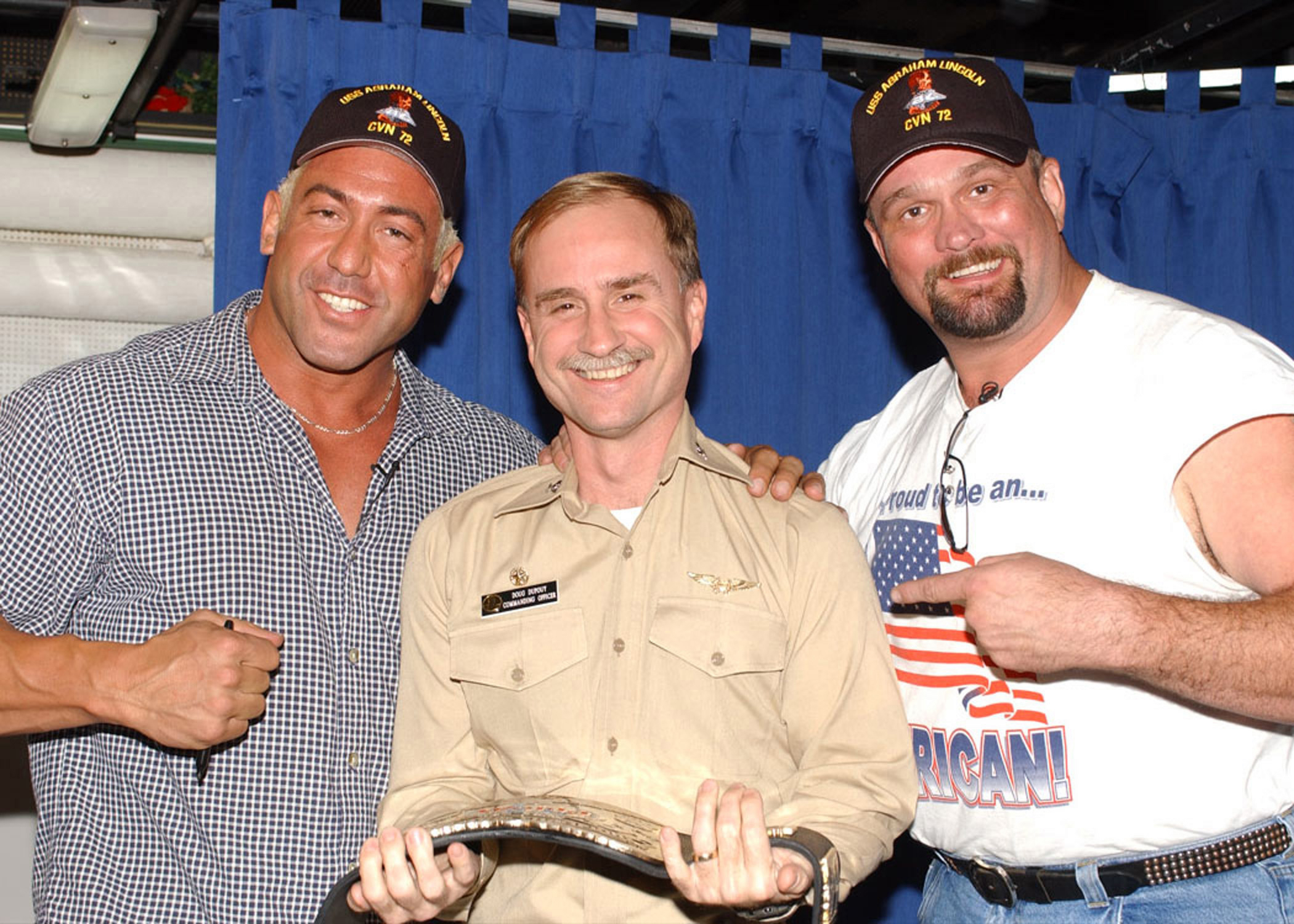
Traylor at a charity event in May 2002

In the summer of 2000, Boss Man disappeared from the WWF's primary television shows, wrestling mainly on Jakked and Heat, where he had a minor feud with Crash Holly until suffering a legit injury in April 2001, keeping him out of The Invasion storyline, which featured invading WCW and ECW wrestlers, for much of the year. He returned on the December 20, 2001 episode of SmackDown!, his name now shortened to The Boss Man hitting "Stone Cold" Steve Austin with a chair shot in his match against Booker T who he forming a team with after Vince McMahon ordered him to be his enforcer. The team quietly split in late January 2002, and Boss Man returned to Jakked/Metal and Heat. In April, he formed a short-lived tag team with Mr. Perfect after both were drafted to the Raw brand. On the May 26 episode of Heat, he lost his final and only match when the WWF was rebranded to WWE to Tommy Dreamer. In the summer, Traylor was assigned to train developmental wrestlers in Ohio Valley Wrestling. He was released from WWE in 2003 after his contract expired; thus ending his second and final tenure with the company after six years.

=== International Wrestling Association of Japan (2004) ===
After a year-long hiatus, Traylor returned in 2004 to wrestle for the International Wrestling Association of Japan, attacking Steve Williams at a show in Korakuen Hall. In his first match back on March 12, he teamed with Keizo Matsuda in a loss to Mike Rotunda and Williams. On August 31, he competed in a tournament for the vacant IWA World Heavyweight Championship but lost to Jim Duggan in the finals.

== Personal life ==
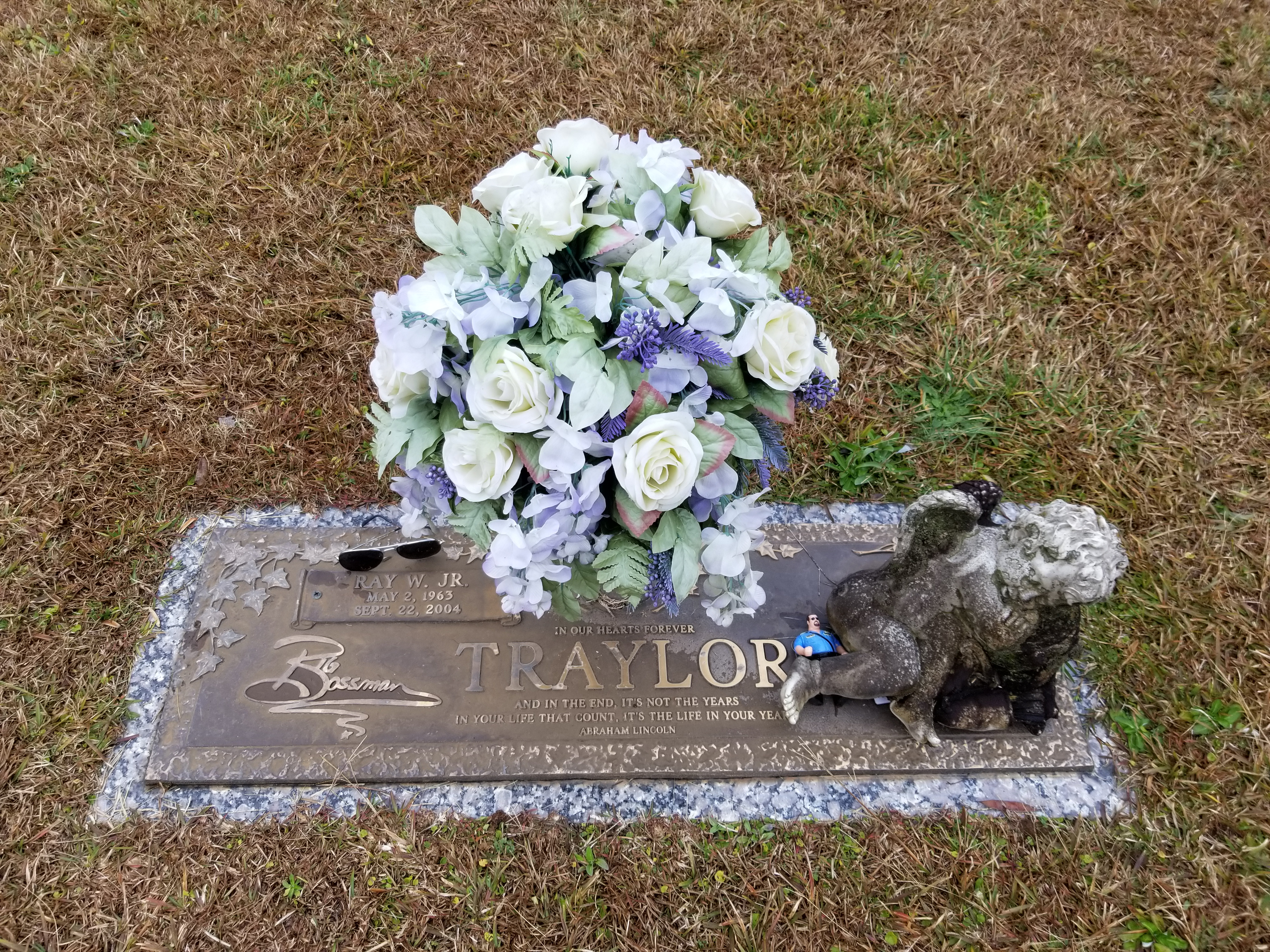
Grave of Ray W. Traylor Jr., aka "The Big Bossman" at the Dallas Memory Gardens in Dallas, Georgia, United States.

Traylor was married to his childhood sweetheart Angela, and they had two daughters.

Traylor suffered a motorcycle accident on his Harley-Davidson in May 2002 after he hit a deer and was badly injured. He was badly affected by close friend Curt Hennig's death in 2003.

In July 2004, Traylor unsuccessfully ran for Commission chairman for Paulding County, Georgia. He was the owner of a Dallas, Georgia, storage company called RWT Enterprises.

== Death and legacy ==
Traylor died of a heart attack at the age of 41 on September 22, 2004, at his home in Dallas, Georgia. According to The Wrestling Observer, Traylor's sister had been visiting, and while his two daughters went upstairs to play, his wife Angela briefly left the room at about 10:00 p.m., and returned to find him dead on the sofa.

Traylor was posthumously inducted into the WWE Hall of Fame in 2016 by Slick, with his widow and daughters accepting the award on his behalf.

His life was chronicled and featured as a namesake title on the fifth episode within the seventh season of the Canadian docuseries, Dark Side of the Ring.

== Other media ==
Big Boss Man appears in video games including WWF Superstars, WWF WrestleMania Challenge, WWF WrestleFest, WWF Rage in the Cage, WWF Attitude, WWF WrestleMania 2000, WWF SmackDown!, WWF SmackDown! 2: Know Your Role and WWF No Mercy. He further appears posthumously in WWE Legends of WrestleMania, WWE '13, WWE 2K16, WWE 2K17 WWE 2K18, WWE 2K19, WWE 2K20, WWE 2K22, WWE 2K23 and WWE 2K24.

== Championships and accomplishments ==
- Pro Wrestling Illustrated
  - Ranked No. 23 of the top 500 singles wrestlers in the PWI 500 in 1992
  - Ranked No. 138 of the top 500 singles wrestlers in the "PWI Years" in 2003
- Universal Wrestling Federation
  - UWF Heavyweight Championship (1 time)
- World Wrestling Federation/WWE
  - WWF Hardcore Championship (4 times)
  - WWF Tag Team Championship (1 time) – with Ken Shamrock
  - WWE Hall of Fame (Class of 2016)
- Wrestling Observer Newsletter
  - Most Improved (1987)
  - Best Gimmick (1996) – nWo
  - Feud of the Year (1996) New World Order vs. World Championship Wrestling
  - Worst Feud of the Year (1996) vs. John Tenta
  - Worst Feud of the Year (1999) vs. The Big Show
  - Worst Worked Match of the Year (1999) vs. Al Snow at Unforgiven
