= RetroMania Wrestling =

- Developer: RetroSoft Studios
- Publisher: RetroSoft Studios
- Series: WrestleFest
- Platforms: Xbox One; PlayStation 4; Nintendo Switch; Microsoft Windows
- Release: April 1, 2021
- Genres: Fighting, wrestling
- Modes: Single-player, multiplayer

RetroMania Wrestling is a professional wrestling video game by RetroSoft Studios, and was released on April 1, 2021. The game was created as a homage to the classic WWF arcade games WWF Superstars and WWF WrestleFest.

== Gameplay ==
RetroMania Wrestling simulates professional wrestling matches, with multiple game modes included.

In the Story mode, the player goes through the comeback story of Johnny Retro (aka John Morrison), with branching dialogue options that offer the choice of whom to befriend and whom to backstab.

10 Pounds of Gold is a standard tournament where the player must compete in various match types to reach and challenge Nick Aldis for the NWA Worlds Heavyweight Championship.

A Royal Rumble-style match is included as Retro Rumble, where up to 16 men can compete.

The game also features a Versus mode with match customization, and the game includes tag team and cage match options.

RetroMania's grappling system is timing-based, similar to that of the Fire Pro Wrestling series. The game features light, medium, and heavy grapple moves. Strong grapple moves can only be completed after the character's momentum bar fills. Each wrestler also possesses standing strikes, running attacks, running counterattacks, ground attacks, and moves from the top turnbuckle.

== Reception ==
According to Metacritic, reception to Retromania was mixed or average, with a critic metascore of 74 and user score of 6.7. Paste Magazine wrote, "RetroMania is faithful to its inspiration, with the right kind of updates needed to bring it up to modern gaming standards." NintendoLife criticized the length of the story and said that the game "feels like a prototype."

== See also ==
- List of licensed wrestling video games
- List of fighting games
