= List of professional wrestling video games =

The following is a list of sports video games based on professional wrestling, licensed by promotions such as WWF/WWE, WCW, ECW, NJPW, TNA, AAA, and AEW.

== Promotion-based games ==
=== All Elite Wrestling ===
Video games by professional wrestling promotion All Elite Wrestling:

1. AEW Casino: Double or Nothing [2020] (iOS, Android)
2. AEW Elite GM [2020] (iOS, Android)
3. AEW Fight Forever [2023] (Nintendo Switch, PlayStation 5, PlayStation 4, Xbox Series X/S, Xbox One, PC)
4. AEW Rise to the Top [2024] (iOS, Android)
5. AEW Figure Fighters [2024] (iOS, Android)

=== All Japan Pro Wrestling ===
Video games featuring professional wrestling promotion All Japan Pro Wrestling:

1. All Japan Pro Wrestling [1993] (SNES)
2. All Japan Pro Wrestling Dash: World's Strongest Tag Team [1993] (SNES)
3. All Japan Pro Wrestling Jet [1994] (Game Boy)
4. Zen-Nihon Pro Wrestling: Fight da Pon! [1994] (SNES)
5. All Japan Pro Wrestling 2: 3-4 Budokan [1995] (SNES)
6. All Japan Pro Wrestling featuring Virtua [1997] (Saturn)
7. King's Soul: All Japan Pro Wrestling [1999] (PlayStation)
8. Giant Gram: All Japan Pro Wrestling 2 [1999] (Dreamcast)
9. Giant Gram 2000: All Japan Pro Wrestling 3 [2000] (Dreamcast)
10. Virtual Pro Wrestling 2 [2000] (Nintendo 64)
11. King of Colosseum Red [2003] (PlayStation 2)
12. King of Colosseum II [2004] (PlayStation 2)
13. Wrestle Kingdom [2006] (Xbox 360, PlayStation 2)
14. Wrestle Kingdom 2 [2007] (PlayStation 2)

=== All Japan Women's Pro-Wrestling ===
Video games by former professional wrestling promotion All Japan Women's Pro-Wrestling:

1. Dump Matsumoto (Body Slam) [1986] (Arcade, Master System)
2. Fire Pro Women: All-Star Dream Slam [1994] (SNES)
3. Super Fire Pro Wrestling: Queen's Special [1995] (Super Famicom, TurboGrafx-16/PC Engine)
4. Wrestling Universe: Fire Pro Women: Dome Super Female Big Battle: All Japan Women VS J.W.P. [1995] (TurboGrafx-CD/PC Engine-CD)
5. All Japan Women's Pro-Wrestling: Queen of Queens [1995] (PC-FX)
6. All Japan Women's Pro-Wrestling [1998] (PlayStation)

=== Extreme Championship Wrestling ===
Video games featuring former professional wrestling promotion Extreme Championship Wrestling:

1. ECW Hardcore Revolution [2000] (Nintendo 64, PlayStation, Game Boy Color, Dreamcast)
2. ECW Anarchy Rulz [2000] (PlayStation, Dreamcast)
3. WWE SmackDown vs. Raw 2008 [2007] (PlayStation 2, PlayStation 3, PlayStation Portable, Nintendo DS, Wii, Xbox 360, Mobile) *Featured as the ECW Brand
4. WWE SmackDown vs. Raw 2009 [2008] (PlayStation 2, PlayStation 3, PlayStation Portable, Nintendo DS, Wii, Xbox 360, Mobile) *Featured as the ECW Brand
5. WWE SmackDown vs. Raw 2010 [2009] (PlayStation 2, PlayStation 3, PlayStation Portable, Nintendo DS, Wii, Xbox 360, IOS) *Featured as the ECW Brand

=== Frontier Martial-Arts Wrestling ===
Video games featuring professional wrestling promotion Frontier Martial-Arts Wrestling:

1. Onita Atsushi FMW [1993] (Super Famicom)
2. Ultra Pro Wrestling [upcoming] (PlayStation 5, Xbox Series X/S, Nintendo Switch, Personal Computer/PC)

=== JWP Joshi Puroresu ===
Video games featuring professional wrestling promotion JWP Project:

1. JWP Women's Pro-Wrestling: Pure Wrestle Queens [1994] (Super Famicom)
2. Wrestling Universe: Fire Pro Women: Dome Super Female Big Battle: All Japan Women VS J.W.P. [1995] (TurboGrafx-CD/PC Engine-CD)

=== Lucha Libre AAA World Wide ===
Video games featuring professional wrestling promotion Lucha Libre AAA World Wide:

1. Lucha Libre AAA: Héroes del Ring [2010] (PlayStation 3, Xbox 360) Released on Wii exclusively in South American regions
2. WWE 2K26 [2026] (PlayStation 5, Xbox Series X, Nintendo Switch 2, Personal Computer/PC) *Featured as DLC

=== New Japan Pro-Wrestling ===
Video games featuring professional wrestling promotion New Japan Pro-Wrestling:

1. New Japan Pro-Wrestling: The Three Musketeers [1991] (Game Boy)
2. New Japan Pro-Wrestling: Fantastic Story in Tokyo Dome [1993] (SNES)
3. New Japan Pro-Wrestling '94 [1994] (SNES)
4. New Japan Pro-Wrestling '94: Battlefield in Tokyo Dome [1994] (TurboGrafx-CD, Super Famicom)
5. New Japan Pro-Wrestling '95: Battle 7 in Tokyo Dome [1995] (SNES)
6. New Japan Pro-Wrestling: Toukon Retsuden [1995] (PlayStation, WonderSwan)
7. New Japan Pro-Wrestling: Toukon Retsuden 2 [1996] (PlayStation)
8. New Japan Pro-Wrestling: Toukon Road – Brave Spirits [1998] (Nintendo 64)
9. New Japan Pro-Wrestling: Toukon Retsuden 3 [1998] (PlayStation)
10. New Japan Pro-Wrestling: Toukon Road 2 – The Next Generation [1998] (Nintendo 64)
11. New Japan Pro-Wrestling: Toukon Retsuden 4 [1999] (Dreamcast)
12. All Star Pro-Wrestling [2000] (PlayStation 2)
13. All Star Pro-Wrestling II [2001] (PlayStation 2)
14. New Japan Pro-Wrestling: Toukon Retsuden Advance [2002] (Game Boy Advance)
15. All Star Pro Wrestling III [2003] (PlayStation 2)
16. King of Colosseum Red [2003] (PlayStation 2)
17. King of Colosseum II [2004] (PlayStation 2)
18. Wrestle Kingdom [2006] (Xbox 360, PlayStation 2)
19. Wrestle Kingdom 2 [2007] (PlayStation 2)
20. Fire Pro Wrestling World [2018] (Personal Computer/PC, PlayStation 4)
21. King of Sports - New Japan Pro Wrestling [2018] (iOS, Android)
22. NJPW Collection [2020] (iOS, Android)
23. NJPW Strong Spirits [2021] (iOS, Android)

=== Pro Wrestling Noah ===
Video games featuring professional wrestling promotion Pro Wrestling Noah:

1. All Star Pro-Wrestling II [2001] (PlayStation 2)
2. All Star Pro Wrestling III [2003] (PlayStation 2)
3. Gekitou Densetsu Noah: Dream Management [2003] (Game Boy Advance)
4. King of Colosseum Green [2003] (PlayStation 2)
5. King of Colosseum II [2004] (PlayStation 2)
6. Wrestle Kingdom [2006] (Xbox 360, PlayStation 2)

=== Pro Wrestling Zero1 ===
Video games featuring professional wrestling promotion Pro Wrestling Zero1:

1. All Star Pro-Wrestling II [2001] (PlayStation 2)
2. New Japan Pro-Wrestling: Toukon Retsuden Advance [2002] (Game Boy Advance)
3. All Star Pro Wrestling III [2003] (PlayStation 2)
4. King of Colosseum Green [2003] (PlayStation 2)
5. King of Colosseum II [2004] (PlayStation 2)

=== Total Nonstop Action Wrestling ===
Video games by professional wrestling promotion Total Nonstop Action Wrestling:

1. TNA Impact! [2008] (PlayStation 2, PlayStation 3, Xbox 360, Wii)
2. TNA Wrestling [2008/09] (Verizon Wireless, iOS)
3. TNA Impact!: Cross The Line [2010] (Nintendo DS, PlayStation Portable)
4. TNA Wrestling Impact! [2011] (iOS, Android)

=== World Championship Wrestling ===
Video games by former professional wrestling promotion World Championship Wrestling:

1. WCW Wrestling [1989] (NES)
2. WCW: The Main Event [1994] (Game Boy)
3. WCW SuperBrawl Wrestling [1994] (SNES)
4. WCW vs. the World [1997] (PlayStation)
5. WCW vs. nWo: World Tour [1997] (Nintendo 64)
6. Virtual Pro Wrestling 64 [1997] (Nintendo 64)
7. WCW Nitro [1998] (PlayStation, Nintendo 64, Microsoft Windows)
8. WCW/nWo Revenge [1998] (Nintendo 64)
9. WCW/nWo Thunder [1999] (PlayStation)
10. WCW Mayhem [1999] (PlayStation, Nintendo 64, Game Boy Color)
11. WCW Backstage Assault [2000] (PlayStation, Nintendo 64)
12. UWC [2019] (NES) *Cancelled prototype, released to the public in 2019

=== World Wrestling Federation / Entertainment ===
Some WWF / WWE games which share a name but were produced for different platforms are considered separate, especially if they were released years apart. For example, the SNES game WWF Royal Rumble is completely different from the Dreamcast game entitled WWF Royal Rumble released years later.

1. MicroLeague Wrestling [1987] (Amiga, Commodore 64)
2. WWF WrestleMania [1989] (NES)
3. WWF Superstars [1989] (Arcade)
4. WWF WrestleMania Challenge [1990] (NES)
5. WWF Superstars [1991] (Game Boy)
6. WWF WrestleFest [1991] (Arcade)
7. WWF WrestleMania [1991] (Amstrad CPC, Amiga, Commodore 64, ZX Spectrum, Atari ST, Personal Computer/PC)
8. WWF Super WrestleMania [1992] (SNES, Mega Drive/Genesis)
9. WWF Superstars 2 [1992] (Game Boy)
10. WWF WrestleMania: Steel Cage Challenge [1992] (Master System, Game Gear, NES)
11. WWF European Rampage Tour [1992] (Amiga, Atari ST, Personal Computer/PC, Commodore 64)
12. WWF Royal Rumble [1993] (SNES, Mega Drive/Genesis)
13. WWF King of the Ring [1993] (NES, Game Boy)
14. WWF Rage in the Cage [1993] (Sega CD)
15. WWF Raw [1994] (32X, Mega Drive/Genesis, Game Boy, Game Gear, SNES)
16. WWF WrestleMania: The Arcade Game [1995] (Arcade, 32X, Mega Drive/Genesis, MS-DOS, PlayStation, Saturn, SNES)
17. WWF In Your House [1996] (Personal Computer/PC, PlayStation, Saturn, MS-DOS)
18. WWF War Zone [1998] (Game Boy, PlayStation, Nintendo 64)
19. WWF Attitude [1999] (Game Boy Color, Nintendo 64, PlayStation, Dreamcast)
20. WWF WrestleMania 2000 [1999] (Nintendo 64, Game Boy Color)
21. WWF SmackDown! [2000] (PlayStation)
22. WWF Royal Rumble [2000] (Arcade, Dreamcast)
23. WWF No Mercy [2000] (Nintendo 64)
24. WWF SmackDown! 2: Know Your Role [2000] (PlayStation)
25. WWF With Authority! [2001] (Microsoft Windows)
26. WWF Betrayal [2001] (Game Boy Color)
27. WWF Road to WrestleMania [2001] (Game Boy Advance)
28. WWF SmackDown! Just Bring It [2001] (PlayStation 2)
29. WWF Mobile Madness [2002] (Mobile)
30. WWF Raw [2002] (Personal Computer/PC, Xbox)
31. WWE WrestleMania X8 [2002] (GameCube)
32. WWE Road to WrestleMania X8 [2002] (Game Boy Advance)
33. WWE SmackDown! Shut Your Mouth [2002] (PlayStation 2)
34. WWE Crush Hour [2003] (PlayStation 2, GameCube)
35. WWE Mobile Madness Hardcore [2003] (Mobile)
36. WWE Mobile Madness: Cage [2003] (Mobile)
37. WWE WrestleMania XIX [2003] (GameCube)
38. WWE Raw 2 [2003] (Xbox)
39. WWE SmackDown! Here Comes the Pain [2003] (PlayStation 2)
40. WWE Day of Reckoning [2004] (GameCube)
41. WWE Survivor Series [2004] (Game Boy Advance)
42. WWE SmackDown! vs. Raw [2004] (PlayStation 2)
43. WWE Raw [2005] (Mobile)
44. WWE Smackdown [2005] (Mobile)
45. WWE WrestleMania 21 [2005] (Xbox)
46. WWE Aftershock [2005] (N-Gage)
47. WWE Day of Reckoning 2 [2005] (GameCube)
48. WWE Plug N' Play [2005]
49. WWE SmackDown! vs. Raw 2006 [2005] (PlayStation 2, PlayStation Portable)
50. WWE SmackDown vs. Raw 2007 [2006] (Xbox 360, PlayStation 2, PlayStation Portable)
51. WWE SmackDown vs. Raw 2008 [2007] (PlayStation 2, PlayStation 3, PlayStation Portable, Nintendo DS, Wii, Xbox 360, Mobile)
52. WWE SmackDown vs. Raw 2009 [2008] (PlayStation 2, PlayStation 3, PlayStation Portable, Nintendo DS, Wii, Xbox 360, Mobile)
53. WWE Legends of WrestleMania [2009] (PlayStation 3, Xbox 360, IOS)
54. WWE SmackDown vs. Raw 2010 [2009] (PlayStation 2, PlayStation 3, PlayStation Portable, Nintendo DS, Wii, Xbox 360, IOS)
55. WWE SmackDown vs. Raw 2011 [2010] (PlayStation 2, PlayStation 3, PlayStation Portable, Wii, Xbox 360)
56. WWE All Stars [2011] (PlayStation 2, PlayStation 3, PlayStation Portable, Wii, Nintendo 3DS, Xbox 360)
57. WWE Superstar Slingshot [2011] (Mobile)
58. WWE '12 [2011] (PlayStation 3, Wii, Xbox 360)
59. WWE '13 [2012] (PlayStation 3, Wii, Xbox 360)
60. Apptivity WWE Rumblers [2012] (iPad)
61. WWE WrestleFest [2012] (iPad)
62. WWE 2K14 [2013] (PlayStation 3, Xbox 360)
63. WWE Presents: John Cena's Fast Lane [2013] (iOS, Android)
64. WWE Presents: RockPocalypse [2013] (iOS, Android)
65. WWE SuperCard [2014] (iOS, Android)
66. WWE 2K15 [2014] (PlayStation 3, Xbox 360, PlayStation 4, Xbox One, Personal Computer/PC, Android, iOS)
67. WWE 2K [2015] (iOS, Android)
68. WWE Immortals [2015] (iOS, Android)
69. WWE 2K16 [2015] (PlayStation 3, Xbox 360, PlayStation 4, Xbox One, Personal Computer/PC)
70. WWE 2K17 [2016] (PlayStation 3, Xbox 360, PlayStation 4, Xbox One, Personal Computer/PC)
71. WWE Champions [2017] (iOS, Android)
72. WWE Tap Mania [2017] (iOS, Android)
73. WWE 2K18 [2017] (PlayStation 4, Xbox One, Nintendo Switch, Personal Computer/PC)
74. WWE Mayhem [2017] (iOS, Android)
75. WWE 2K19 [2018] (PlayStation 4, Xbox One, Personal Computer/PC)
76. WWE 2K20 [2019] (PlayStation 4, Xbox One, Personal Computer/PC)
77. WWE Universe [2019] (iOS, Android)
78. The King of Fighters All Star [2020] (iOS, Android)
79. WWE 2K Battlegrounds [2020] (PlayStation 4, Xbox One, Nintendo Switch, Personal Computer/PC)
80. WWE Racing Showdown [2020] (Android)
81. WWE Champions 2021 [2021] (iOS, Android)
82. WWE Undefeated [2021] (iOS, Android)
83. WWE 2K22 [2022] (PlayStation 4, Xbox One, PlayStation 5, Xbox Series X, Personal Computer/PC)
84. WWE 2K23 [2023] (PlayStation 4, Xbox One, PlayStation 5, Xbox Series X, Personal Computer/PC)
85. WWE 2K24 [2024] (PlayStation 4, Xbox One, PlayStation 5, Xbox Series X, Personal Computer/PC)
86. WWE 2K25 [2025] (PlayStation 4, Xbox One, PlayStation 5, Xbox Series X, Nintendo Switch 2, Personal Computer/PC, Netflix)
87. WWE 2K26 [2026] (PlayStation 5, Xbox Series X, Nintendo Switch 2, Personal Computer/PC)
88. WWE Generations: Eras Collide [2026] (iOS) (Android )

=== Other promotions ===
1. Wrestle and Romance — Genichiro Tenryu's Pro-Wrestling Revolution [1994] (Super Famicom) Released in North America as Hammerlock Wrestling.
2. UWF International — Saikyō: Takada Nobuhiko [1995] (Super Famicom)
3. Fighting of World Japan Pro Wrestling — King of Colosseum II [2004] (PlayStation 2)
4. 5 Star Wrestling — 5 Star Wrestling [2015] (PlayStation 3, PlayStation 4)
5. Chikara — Action Arcade Wrestling [2021] (Personal Computer/PC, Nintendo Switch, PlayStation 4, Xbox One) All Chikara branding such as the name, official roster, music, graphics, and etc. was dropped due to the company's controversy and closure before its release.
6. World Wonder Ring Stardom — Fire Pro Wrestling World [2018] (Personal Computer/PC, PlayStation 4)
7. National Wrestling Alliance — RetroMania Wrestling [2021] (PlayStation 4, Xbox One, Personal Computer/PC, Nintendo Switch)
8. Ohio Valley Wrestling — Ultra Pro Wrestling [upcoming] (PlayStation 5, Xbox Series X/S, Nintendo Switch, Personal Computer/PC)
9. Warrior Wrestling — Wrestle Deck [2021] (iOS/Android)
10. Monster Factory — Wrestle Deck [2021] (iOS/Android)

== Brandless games ==
These titles do not belong to a specific brand. However, some of the following titles include real wrestlers from brands like WWF/WWE, WCW, NWA, ECW, TNA, NJPW, AJPW, and NOAH.

1. Tag Team Wrestling [1983] (Arcade)
2. Appoooh [1984] (Arcade)
3. Champion Pro Wrestling [1985] (Arcade, SG-1000, MSX)
4. Mat Mania – The Prowrestling Network [1985] (Arcade)
5. Rock'n Wrestle [1985] (ZX Spectrum, Amstrad, Commodore 64) *Also known as Bop 'n Wrestle
6. Mania Challenge [1986] (Arcade)
7. Pro Wrestling [1986] (NES, Famicom, Arcade)
8. Robo Wres 2001 [1986] (Arcade, PC-8801)
9. Tag Team Match: M.U.S.C.L.E. [1986] (NES)
10. Title Match Pro Wrestling [1987] (Atari 2600, Atari 7800)
11. The Main Event [1988] (Arcade)
12. Champion Wrestler [1989] (Arcade, PC Engine)
13. Fire Pro Wrestling Combination Tag [1989] (PC Engine, Wii)
14. Grudge Match [1989] (Arcade)
15. Title Match Pro Wrestling [1989] (Atari 7800)
16. Sgt. Slaughter's Mat Wars [1989] (Commodore 64)
17. Wrestle War [1989] (Arcade, Mega Drive)
18. Cutie Suzuki's Ringside Angel [1990] (Mega Drive/Genesis)
19. Hal Wrestling [1990] (Game Boy)
20. Mat Mania Challenge [1990] (Atari 7800)
21. Tecmo World Wrestling [1990] (NES)
22. Fire Pro Wrestling 2nd Bout [1991] (PC Engine, Wii)
23. Super Fire Pro Wrestling [1991] (Super Famicom)
24. Ring Rage [1992] (Arcade)
25. Thunder Pro Wrestling Retsuden [1992] (Mega Drive)
26. Fire Pro Wrestling 3: Legend Bout [1992] (PC Engine)
27. Super Fire Pro Wrestling 2 [1992] (Super Famicom)
28. American Tag-Team Wrestling [1992] (Amiga, Commodore 64, ZX Spectrum, Amstrad CPC)
29. Toukon Club [1992] (Famicom)
30. 3 Count Bout [1993] (Arcade)
31. Saturday Night Slam Masters [1993] (Arcade, Super Nintendo, Mega Drive/Genesis, FM Towns)
32. Super Fire Pro Wrestling 3 Final Bout [1993] (Super Famicom)
33. Fire Pro Gaiden: Blazing Tornado [1994] (Arcade, Saturn)
34. Funaki Masakatsu Hybrid Wrestler [1994] (Super Famicom)
35. Ring of Destruction: Slam Masters II [1994] (Arcade)
36. Super Fire Pro Wrestling 3 Easy Bout [1994] (Super Famicom)
37. Super Fire Pro Wrestling Special [1994] (Super Famicom)
38. Gekitou Burning Pro Wrestling [1995] (Super Famicom)
39. Stardust Suplex [1995] (Super Famicom)
40. Super Fire Pro Wrestling X [1995] (Super Famicom)
41. Champion Wrestler: Jikkyou Live [1996] (PlayStation)
42. Fire Pro Wrestling: Iron Slam '96 [1996] (PlayStation)
43. Fire Prowrestling S: 6Men Scramble [1996] (Saturn)
44. Jikkyō Power Pro Wrestling '96: Max Voltage [1996] (Super Famicom)
45. Life Pro Wrestling: An Elegy for Pro Wrestlers [1996] (PC)
46. Super Fire Pro Wrestling X Premium [1996] (Super Famicom)
47. Fire Pro Wrestling for WonderSwan [2000] (WonderSwan)
48. Fire Pro Wrestling G [1999] (PlayStation)
49. Simple 1500 Series Vol. 22: The Pro Wrestling [1999] (PlayStation)
50. Big Bang Pro Wrestling [2000] (NEOGEO Pocket Color)
51. Simple 1500 Series Vol. 52: The Pro Wrestling 2 [2000] (PlayStation)
52. Fire Pro Wrestling [2001] (Game Boy Advance)
53. Fire Pro Wrestling D [2001] (Dreamcast)
54. Legends of Wrestling [2001] (PlayStation 2, GameCube, Xbox)
55. Fire Pro Wrestling 2 [2002] (Game Boy Advance)
56. Legends of Wrestling II [2002] (Game Boy Advance, PlayStation 2, GameCube, Xbox)
57. Backyard Wrestling: Don't Try This at Home [2003] (PlayStation 2, Xbox)
58. Def Jam Vendetta [2003] (PlayStation 2, GameCube)
59. Fire Pro Wrestling Z [2004] (PlayStation 2)
60. Backyard Wrestling 2: There Goes the Neighborhood [2004] (PlayStation 2, Xbox)
61. Rumble Roses [2004] (PlayStation 2)
62. Showdown: Legends of Wrestling [2004] (PlayStation 2, Xbox)
63. Fire Pro Wrestling Returns [2005] (PlayStation 2)
64. Rumble Roses XX [2006] (Xbox 360)
65. Hulk Hogan's Main Event [2011] (Xbox 360)
66. Fire Pro Wrestling [2012] (Xbox 360)
67. Fire Pro Wrestling in Mobage [2012] (Mobage)
68. Wrestling Revolution [2012] (Android)
69. Pro Wrestling X [2014] (PC)
70. Wrestling Revolution 3D [2017] (Android, IOS, PC)
71. RetroMania Wrestling [2021] (PlayStation 4, Xbox One, Personal Computer/PC, Nintendo Switch)
72. Wrestling Empire [2021] (Nintendo Switch, iOS, PC, Android)
73. Pro Wrestling Sim [2021] (PC)
74. Casual Pro Wrestling [2023] (PC)
75. Modern Mania Wrestling GM [2023] (Android, IOS)
76. WrestleQuest [2023] (PlayStation 5, Xbox Series X/S, PlayStation 4, Xbox One, Nintendo Switch, Personal Computer/PC)
77. Mark Out! The Wrestling Card Game [2023] (PC)
78. GM Universe (IOS/Android)
79. Journey of Wrestling [2024] (PC)
80. Pro Wrestler Story [2024] (Android, iOS, PC)
81. Eras of Wrestling [2026] (Android, iOS)
82. Lucha Chess [2026] (PC)
83. Wrestling Classics: Olde Timey Pro Wrestling [2026] (PC)

== Upcoming games ==
1. The Wrestling Code [upcoming] (PlayStation 5, Xbox Series X/S, Personal Computer/PC)
2. Ultra Pro Wrestling [upcoming] (PlayStation 5, Xbox Series X/S, Nintendo Switch, Personal Computer/PC)
3. Bastante Bueno Lucha Libre [upcoming] (PC)
4. Neckbreaker: Visceral Pro Wrestling [upcoming] (PC)
5. Main Event: Wrestling Manager [upcoming] (PC)
6. Micro Titans Wrestling [upcoming] (PC)
7. Thumblemania [upcoming] (PC)
8. Lucha Throwdown [upcoming] (PC)
9. Wrestle Story [upcoming] (PC)
10. Winning Hearts: Wrestling Otome [upcoming] (PC)
11. Legendary Pro Wrestling: Fighting Spirit [upcoming] (PC)

== See also ==
- WWE 2K
- List of video games in the WWE 2K Games series
- List of fighting games
- List of sumo video games
- List of wrestling video games
