= WWF Rage in the Cage =

1993 video game

- Cover art featuring various WWF wrestlers.
- Developer: Sculptured Software
- Publisher: Acclaim Entertainment (Note: Released under the Arena Entertainment brand name.)
- Producers: Mark Flitman; Michael Arkin
- Programmer: Arti Haroutunian
- Artists: Ray Cornia; Clark Sorensen; Les Pardew
- Composers: H. Kingsley Thurber; Paul Webb; Dean Morell; Scotty Fulmer
- Platform: Sega CD
- Release: NA: November 1993; PAL: January 1994
- Genres: Wrestling, fighting, sports
- Modes: Single-player, multiplayer

WWF Rage in the Cage is a professional wrestling video game developed by Sculptured Software and released by Acclaim Entertainment on December 21, 1993 for the Sega CD gaming system. It is a spin-off of LJN's 16-bit WWF games, as the gameplay engine and graphical style are the same as in WWF Royal Rumble for the Super NES and Sega Genesis, also developed by Sculptured Software.

== Features ==
Rage in the Cage is the first WWF game to feature actual video footage in the form of FMV clips seen in the game's opening video, as well clips of the wrestlers' signature moves that can be viewed on the wrestler select screen, and clips that play of the player's wrestler celebrating upon completion of the tournament mode. In addition, the game features audio introductions by Howard Finkel and rants between the competitors prior to the matches. However, for the game's music, developers did not take advantage of the CD format, as it resembles the synthesized music of 16-bit games from that period, more specifically the SNES version of Royal Rumble. Rage in the Cage features 20 wrestlers, the most seen in a WWF game up to that point (this number would not be surpassed until WWF Attitude was released six years later).

== Gameplay ==
Each wrestler possesses punches and kicks, several grapple moves (executed via a "tug-of-war" style lockup system), running attacks, a move off the top turnbuckle, and a signature finishing move unique to that wrestler. Also available are illegal eye gouges and chokeholds, which can only be done outside the ring or if a referee is not present.

Several match variations are available for either one player versus the computer, or two players head-to-head. A One Fall match is a standard bout won by pinfall. In a Brawl match, there is no referee, no count-out, and illegal moves can be done at all times. The match ends only when one wrestler lacks the energy to continue. A Cage Match puts the wrestlers inside of a steel cage. There are no holds barred, and victory is achieved by escaping the cage. Also available is a one-player Tournament mode, where the player selects a wrestler and must defeat the rest in a series of One Fall matches to become WWF Champion. Upon completion, a FMV clip of the wrestler celebrating a victory is shown.

There are no tag team modes, despite the inclusion of tag teams in Money Incorporated, The Headshrinkers, and The Nasty Boys.

== Featured wrestlers ==
- Randy Savage
- Samu
- Fatu
- I.R.S
- Lex Luger
- Razor Ramon
- Ted Dibiase
- Bam Bam Bigelow
- Yokozuna
- Shawn Michaels
- Rick Martel
- Jerry Sags
- Brian Knobbs
- Big Boss Man
- Tatanka
- Bret Hart
- The Undertaker
- Kamala
- Crush
- Mr. Perfect

== Reception ==
In North America, the game sold 69,984 units and grossed $3,526,117.

== See also ==
- List of licensed wrestling video games
- List of fighting games
