= WWE 2K18 =

2017 video game download

- Cover art featuring Seth Rollins
- Developer: Yuke's (Note: Additional work by Visual Concepts; Blind Squirrel Games co-developed the Nintendo Switch version.)
- Publisher: 2K
- Series: WWE 2K
- Platforms: PlayStation 4; Windows; Xbox One; Nintendo Switch
- Release: PlayStation 4, Windows, Xbox One; October 17, 2017 (Note: The Deluxe Edition was released on October 13, 2017.); Nintendo Switch; December 6, 2017
- Genre: Sports
- Modes: Single-player, multiplayer

WWE 2K18 is a professional wrestling video game developed by Yuke's and published by 2K. It is the nineteenth instalment in the WWE game series (fifth under the WWE 2K banner) and a follow-up to WWE 2K17. It was released worldwide on October 17, 2017, for Windows, PlayStation 4, Xbox One and Nintendo Switch. With its release, WWE 2K18 became the first in the series to be exclusively released on eighth generation hardware and also the first in the series to be released for PC and consoles simultaneously. A Nintendo Switch version followed on December 6, 2017, the only release of the series for the Switch and the first WWE game to be released for a Nintendo platform since WWE '13. Not counting WWE 2K Battlegrounds, which released in 2020, 2K18 would be the last WWE game to release on a Nintendo platform until WWE 2K25 released on the Nintendo Switch 2 in July 2025.

Among the features 2K promoted were enhanced graphics and the return of Kurt Angle to the series as a playable character. Critical response to the game was mixed, with particular criticism levied at the Switch version and its various technical issues. A sequel, WWE 2K19, was released in October 2018.

== Marketing ==
On May 23, 2017, 2K Sports announced WWE 2K18 would be released in 2017. On June 19, 2017, 2K released a trailer, revealing that Seth Rollins will be featured as the game's cover star. In the trailer, it features Rollins vandalizing and burning down a fictitious WWE warehouse in Stamford, Connecticut, as well as showing the tagline "Be Like No One". The second trailer features Kurt Angle visiting the ruins of the warehouse and finding a pair of his boots among the ashes, which announced Angle as the game's pre-order. The game's Deluxe Edition was also announced, giving players access to the game four days early, along with the season pass and additional in-game content. On July 10, 2017, a Nintendo Switch version was also confirmed. On July 27, 2K Sports announced the Collector's Edition, called the "Cena (Nuff)" edition. The collector's edition revolves around John Cena, commemorating his 15 years in the WWE, and includes a Cena action figure, a piece of the ring mat from his victory at the 2017 Royal Rumble, and an autographed photo from Cena. Unlike previous years, the Collector's Edition included the game's season pass. The Collector's Edition (as well as the Deluxe Edition) has two additional playable versions of Cena (included with ECW One Night Stand 2006 and WrestleMania XXVI attires), as well as Batista and Rob Van Dam as playable characters.

On August 16, 2K and IGN announced the first 47 playable characters, with a roster reveal special hosted by Corey Graves, Renee Young, and Goldust. Two days later, 2K announced that the soundtrack for the game would be curated by The Rock and will feature a mix of classic rock, modern rock, and hip hop. On September 26, 2K announced that for the first time, the PC version of the game will release alongside its console counterparts on October 17. Season pass details were unveiled on September 27, featuring the Accelerator, MyPlayer kick start, New Moves pack, NXT Generation pack, and the Enduring Icons pack. The NXT Generation pack was released on November 21, 2017, while the pre-order and deluxe edition bonus content was available as a separate purchase a week earlier. The New Moves pack was released on December 12, 2017, and the Enduring Icons pack was released on January 16, 2018. On March 23, 2018, a WrestleMania-themed edition of WWE 2K18 was released internationally, which contained all of the characters and downloadable content in addition to exclusive items prior to WrestleMania 34.

=== Roster ===
On June 29, 2017, it was announced that Kurt Angle would be the pre-order bonus character for WWE 2K18, making his first WWE video game appearance since WWE SmackDown vs. Raw 2007. For the third installment in a row, the roster is the largest included in the series with over 200 WWE superstars from the roster. As part of a product placement deal with KFC, WWE 2K18 has Colonel Sanders as a playable character, accessible through the attire templates in the Create-A-Wrestler feature.

== Gameplay ==
Similar to its predecessors, WWE 2K18 is a professional wrestling game and for the first time since WWF SmackDown! Just Bring It, eight wrestlers are able to be in a match at once, instead of six (the Nintendo Switch version only supports six wrestlers in the ring, due to design considerations). The Royal Rumble match has been retooled, with new mechanics, finishers and elimination sequences. A carry system was introduced (which is similar to the Ultimate Control Grapple system introduced in WWE SmackDown vs. Raw 2007), allowing players to pick up or drag their opponent and place them in a specific spot. Thousands of new moves and animations have been added to the game.

=== Game modes ===
Improvements have been made to the creation suite, such as new superstar parts and materials. One such material is a glow effect, which gives players the ability to make hair, clothing, and logos on their created superstars glow. Other new creation suite features include an enhanced highlight system, however the free-roaming camera has been removed when the highlight reel is being used mid-match. Crowd area templates can also be selected in Create-An-Arena, allowing players to select five different templates that have different weapons and objects to use. The Create-A-Match feature, last seen in the 7th-gen version of WWE 2K17 (WWE 2K15 for 8th-gen players), has returned. New to the feature includes the ability to create your own custom matches and save them for use in exhibition mode, Universe, and Online through Private matches. MyCareer now allows backstage free roaming (Last seen in WWE SmackDown vs Raw 2011's Road to WrestleMania mode), with wrestlers creating alliances and enemies, and fighting styles are introduced in the MyCareer mode, letting players choose between eight different fighting styles, each with its own strengths and weaknesses. However mixed gender tag-team matches are not featured in the game and cannot be created using Create-a-Match.

The new "Road To Glory" mode enables players to use their MyPlayer characters to qualify and compete in events, similar to the one found in WWE SuperCard. This mode replaces the 2K Tonight online mode from WWE 2K17.

Universe mode has been improved with a new story system, alongside new cut-scenes, power-rankings, and a goal system.

=== Commentary and graphics ===
WWE 2K18 features a new commentary team of Monday Night Raw's Michael Cole, SmackDown Live's Byron Saxton, and dual branded commentator Corey Graves. Crowd sound is also improved and features authentic crowd chants for entrances and during a match.

== Reception ==
Reception

Aggregate score
Aggregator	Score
Metacritic	(NS) 35/100 (PC) 64/100 (PS4) 66/100 (XONE) 67/100

Review scores
Publication	Score
Destructoid	5/10
Game Informer	6/10
GameSpot	5/10
GamesRadar+	4/5
IGN	7/10 (NS) 3.8/10
Nintendo Life	3/10
Nintendo World Report	3/10

WWE 2K18 received "mixed or average" reviews, according to review aggregator Metacritic. The Nintendo Switch version, however, received "generally unfavourable" reviews. It was heavily criticized for its inevitable glitches, with montages of them posted on YouTube. The technical issues were more severe on the Switch version.

Upon the release of the Nintendo Switch 2, multiple outlets reported that the Nintendo Switch version of the game runs "significantly better" when played on Nintendo Switch 2, with performance much closer to other versions of the game.

== See also ==
- List of licensed wrestling video games
- List of fighting games
- List of video games in the WWE 2K Games series
