= WWF WrestleMania: Steel Cage Challenge =

1992 video game

- Master System cover art featuring (clockwise from left) Bret Hart, Hulk Hogan, "Macho Man" Randy Savage, Papa Shango, Ted Dibiase vs. "Macho Man" Randy Savage, and The Undertaker
- Developers: Sculptured Software (NES); Teeny Weeny Games (Game Gear/SMS)
- Publishers: Acclaim Entertainment (Note: Released under the LJN brand name on the NES, and the Flying Edge brand name on Sega consoles.); MSI Entertainment (TV game)
- Programmer: Ken Moore
- Composers: Paul Webb (NES); Matt Furniss (Game Gear/SMS)
- Platforms: Nintendo Entertainment System; Master System; Game Gear; TV game
- Release: NES: EU: 1992; NA: September 1992; Game Gear: NA: 1993; EU: June 1993; Master System: EU: July 1993; TV game: NA: 2018
- Genres: Wrestling
- Modes: Single-player, multiplayer

WWF WrestleMania: Steel Cage Challenge is a professional wrestling video game based on the World Wrestling Federation (WWF), released in 1992 by Acclaim Entertainment for the Nintendo Entertainment System and in 1993 for the Master System and the Game Gear handheld console. The NES version was subsequently released as a handheld TV game in 2018 under the name WWE WrestleMania: Steel Cage Challenge, with all references to the "WWF" name and logo replaced by "WWE" (and with two changes to the roster). A second update was released in 2025 as a "mini arcade game," with further roster changes.

== Gameplay ==
Papa Shango faces I.R.S. in the game's titular steel cage match.

Modes include One-on-One (regular match and steel cage match variations), Tag Team, WWF Championship (choose one wrestler and defeat all the others to become WWF Champion), and Tag Team Championship (choose two wrestlers and defeat combinations of the rest in a series of tag team matches to become WWF Tag Team Champions).

=== Roster ===
Ten wrestlers are playable. The NES and Sega versions of the game feature Hulk Hogan, Randy Savage, Ted DiBiase, I.R.S., Bret Hart, and The Undertaker. The NES version also has Jake Roberts, Sid Justice, Roddy Piper, and The Mountie. The Sega versions replace those characters with Ric Flair, Papa Shango, Shawn Michaels and Tatanka. The TV game version features the NES roster, but with Ultimate Warrior and Razor Ramon replacing Hulk Hogan and The Mountie respectively. The Mini Arcade version retains Ultimate Warrior and Razor Ramon, however it removes Randy Savage, and instead reinserts Hulk Hogan back into the roster.

Wrestler	NES	Sega (Game Gear/SMS)	TV game	Mini Arcade
Bret Hart	Yes	Yes	Yes	Yes
Hulk Hogan	Yes	Yes	No	Yes
Irwin R. Schyster	Yes	Yes	Yes	Yes
Jake Roberts	Yes	No	Yes	Yes
The Mountie	Yes	No	No	No
Papa Shango	No	Yes	No	No
Randy Savage	Yes	Yes	Yes	No
Razor Ramon	No	No	Yes	Yes
Ric Flair	No	Yes	No	No
Roddy Piper	Yes	No	Yes	Yes
Shawn Michaels	No	Yes	No	No
Sid Justice	Yes	No	Yes	Yes
Tatanka	No	Yes	No	No
Ted DiBiase	Yes	Yes	Yes	Yes
Ultimate Warrior	No	No	Yes	Yes
The Undertaker	Yes	Yes	Yes	Yes

All wrestlers share the same moveset, consisting of standard punches and kicks, grapples (body slam, throw, headbutt), running attacks (flying clothesline, dropkick), a powerslam to a running opponent, ground attacks (stomp, elbow drop) and a move off the turnbuckle. There are no finishing moves. However, this was the first WWF console-based game to feature a steel cage match (cage matches had previously been seen in the arcade game WWF WrestleFest).

== Reception ==
Reception (Game Gear)

Review score
Publication	Score
Sega Master Force	53%

In North America, the NES version sold 360,048 units and grossed $16,479,120 while the Game Gear version sold 75,020 units and grossed $2,879,614, for a total of 435,068 units sold and $19,358,734 revenue.

The Game Gear version of WWF WrestleMania: Steel Cage Challenge received a score of 53% from Sega Master Force.

== See also ==
- List of licensed wrestling video games
- List of fighting games
