= WWF European Rampage Tour =

1992 video game

- Cover art with Randy Savage, Ultimate Warrior, and Bret Hart
- Developer: Arc Developments
- Publisher: Ocean Software
- Platforms: Amiga, Atari ST, Commodore 64, MS-DOS
- Release: 1992
- Genre: Wrestling
- Modes: Single-player, multiplayer

WWF European Rampage Tour is a game based on the World Wrestling Federation (WWF), created by Arc Developments and published in 1992 by Ocean Software for the Amiga, Atari ST, Commodore 64, and MS-DOS. It capitalizes on the success of the previous WWF game for home computers, WWF WrestleMania, and was aimed predominantly at the European markets. It was the last WWF game released strictly for home computers until the release of WWF With Authority! in 2001. The game is based on the real-life WWF European Rampage tours held in early nineties.

== Gameplay ==
One or two players form a tag team choosing from Hulk Hogan, Randy Savage, Ultimate Warrior, and Bret Hart and then must first defeat the tag teams of The Nasty Boys, The Natural Disasters, and Money Inc. three times each (first in The Britannic Arena in London, England, followed by The Deutsche Nationale Arena in Munich, Germany, and finally the Palais Omnisports de Paris-Bercy, France). The final match is a championship bout (which is thus the only one that can't be won via a countout) with The Legion of Doom in New York City's Madison Square Garden.

The Amiga version uses sampled entrance themes and speech. However, the in-game graphics and gameplay are limited. Each wrestler has the same basic wrestling attacks including punches, kicks, dropkicks, backbreakers and powerslams (regular ones, which are very hard to perform, or Gorilla press ones, which are easy to perform but fail to lift The Natural Disasters except by Ultimate Warrior). Unlike its predecessor WWF Wrestlemania, there is no time limit for the matches.

The game also includes a two-player practice mode, however, player 2 is automatically assigned the Nasty Boys team (whose names are incorrectly switched).

=== Commodore 64 version ===
The Commodore 64 version only includes only singles matches. The player must defeat Typhoon from The Natural Disasters, Irwin R. Schyster from Money Inc. and Jerry Sags from The Nasty Boys in various venues before challenging Animal from The Legion of Doom for the championship. A two-player practice mode is also included.

== Reception ==
The game was poorly received. Amiga Reviews rated the Amiga version 18%, stating "WWF is a triumph of presentation over gameplay. The theme tunes and effects glide along with the slick opening titles. But that's it."

== See also ==
- List of licensed professional wrestling video games
