= WWF WrestleMania (1989 video game) =

- North American cover art featuring Hulk Hogan
- Developer: Rare
- Publisher: Acclaim Entertainment
- Director: Tim Stamper
- Designers: Jools Jameson; Tim Stamper
- Artist: Kevin Bayliss
- Composer: David Wise
- Platform: Nintendo Entertainment System
- Release: NA: February 1989; EU: 1989
- Genre: Wrestling
- Modes: Single-player, multiplayer

WWF WrestleMania (named after the annual pay-per-view event) is a Nintendo Entertainment System (NES) video game created by Rare and published by Acclaim Entertainment in 1989. It was the first WWF licensed NES game and the second WWF game overall, the first being MicroLeague Wrestling. WrestleMania also marked the beginning of a long relationship between Acclaim and the WWF, which lasted ten years. Released just months prior to WrestleMania V, it was intended to help build up to that event. The game's title screen features the tagline for WrestleMania III: "Bigger. Better. Badder".

A Game Boy version started development in 1990 but was cancelled. It was developed by Zippo Games and designed by John Pickford. Rare later developed a follow-up game, WWF WrestleMania Challenge. A contemporary VCR board game version, designed by Interactive VCR Games, was also released around the same time, as well as a handheld version.

== Gameplay ==
The game features six wrestlers: Hulk Hogan, André the Giant, "Macho Man" Randy Savage, "The Million Dollar Man" Ted DiBiase, Bam Bam Bigelow and The Honky Tonk Man. All wrestlers possess a limited number of moves, which consist of basic standing punches and kicks, headbutts, a running attack, a move off the turnbuckle (which André the Giant and Bam Bam Bigelow cannot perform), and a bodyslam (which Bam Bam Bigelow and Honky Tonk Man cannot perform). All wrestlers also possess a "back attack" that they can use on an opponent standing behind them (usually a backwards punch). The moves themselves are somewhat tailored to each wrestler (Randy Savage, for example, uses elbow smashes instead of punches, while Bam Bam Bigelow has two running attacks instead of one, and Ted Dibiase uses eye gouges instead of kicks). It is also worth noting that only Hulk Hogan is able to bodyslam the massive André the Giant. The wrestlers cannot leave the ring and can only execute turnbuckle attacks from the bottom two corners. Sometimes, while a wrestler is taking punishment, he will turn red, indicating anger. An "angry" wrestler can inflict more damage than normal while in this state. Occasionally, during a match, an icon will come on screen that a wrestler can pick up to gain health. The icons are unique to each wrestler (for example, Honky Tonk Man's looks like a guitar, André's looks like a massive foot, while Hulk Hogan's looks like a crucifix) and cannot be used interchangeably (wrestlers can only pick up their own icons).

Players can either play a single exhibition match (one player versus the computer or two players head-to-head) or a tournament. In a single-player tournament, the player chooses one wrestler and must defeat the other five in a series of matches to win the championship. In a tournament with two or more player-controlled wrestlers (up to six can play), each wrestler faces every other wrestler once (fifteen total matches). At the end of the tournament, the wrestler with the best record wins the championship. In the event of a tie, the wrestler in the tie who achieved the single fastest victory during the tournament will be declared the winner.

== Reception ==
Reception

Review scores
Publication	Score
Game Zone	88/100
Total!	30%

In North America, the game sold 1,042,408 units and grossed $47,710,212.

== Popular culture ==
A scene in the 2008 film The Wrestler features a fictional NES game entitled Wrestle Jam '88. The fully functioning demo features a style inspired by WWF WrestleMania.

== See also ==
- List of licensed wrestling video games
- List of fighting games
