= WWF WrestleMania Challenge =

1990 video game

- Cover art featuring (clockwise from upper left) Big Boss Man, Hulk Hogan, Ultimate Warrior, "Macho King" Randy Savage and André the Giant
- Developer: Rare
- Publishers: NA/EU: LJN; JP: Hot-B
- Designer: Tim Stamper
- Programmer: Mark Wilson
- Artist: Kev Bayliss
- Composer: David Wise
- Platform: Nintendo Entertainment System
- Release: NA: November 1990; EU: 1991; JP: March 27, 1992
- Genres: Sports (wrestling)
- Modes: Single-player, multiplayer

WWF WrestleMania Challenge is a 1990 professional wrestling video game based on the World Wrestling Federation (WWF), released for the Nintendo Entertainment System by LJN. The game features nine wrestlers: Hulk Hogan, André the Giant, "Macho King" Randy Savage, Ultimate Warrior, Big Boss Man, Brutus Beefcake, "Ravishing" Rick Rude, Jim Duggan, and "Yourself" (a generic character). In a two-player game, both players can choose a differently-shaded version of Yourself, each having a unique theme song.

The game was originally developed under the title WWF Survivor Series. After this release, development of games under the WrestleMania name shifted to Sculptured Software, which developed WWF Super WrestleMania and WWF WrestleMania: Steel Cage Challenge.

== Gameplay ==
Features include fluid gameplay and unique (albeit small) movesets for each wrestler. Matches are presented at a high-angle, isometric view of the ring which includes the wrestlers' stamina bars along the apron. An empty bar will render the player vulnerable to pinfalls.

Modes of play include a one-on-one match, a tag team match, a three-on-three Survivor Series elimination match (in the latter two the player can cause their NPC partner to attack the NPC opponent inside or outside the ring) and a championship mode where the player takes control of "Yourself" and must defeat all of the game's wrestlers to win the championship. Also included is a two player-only tag team championship mode where the players control two "yourself" characters and must defeat the game's wrestlers in a series of tag team matches to become champions.

== Reception ==
In North America, the game sold 161,020 units and grossed $7,865,208.

=== Critical reception ===
Reception

Review score
Publication	Score
GamePro	17/25

== See also ==
- List of licensed wrestling video games
- List of fighting games
