= WWE SuperCard =

2014 video game

- Developer: Cat Daddy Games
- Publisher: 2K
- Producers: Simon Deal (Senior Producer), Nicki Beaudry, Roger Faso
- Designer: Nick Mirkovich
- Programmers: Rahil Momin (Senior Game Programmer), Aleksey Perfilev (Senior Game Programmer), Weston Mitchell, Dane Djala
- Artists: Didzis Beitlers, Courtney Evans, Terry Lo, Dusty Peterson, Nachshon Rubel, Chris Soares, Eli Wolff
- Series: WWE 2K
- Platforms: iOS, Android, Amazon Appstore
- Release: August 14, 2014
- Genre: Digital collectible card game
- Modes: Single-player, multiplayer

WWE SuperCard is a 2014 digital collectible card game featuring WWE Superstars for iOS and Android, and a mobile installment in the WWE video game series, under the WWE 2K banner, developed by Cat Daddy Games and published by 2K. As of 2025, it is also the longest running (official) online WWE mobile game.

== Gameplay ==
=== Modes ===
The game has several game modes: Wild (introduced in Season 3 as a name change for Exhibition), King of the Ring, Road to Glory, People's Champion Challenge (retired after Season 2 but returned in Season 10), Ring Domination (introduced in Season 2), Money in the Bank (introduced in Season 2), Team Battleground (introduced in Season 3), Royal Rumble (introduced in Season 3), Ranked which had its name changed to "War" mode with the launch of Season 4 on November 15, 2017, Elimination Chamber (introduced in Season 4), Women's Royal Rumble (introduced in Season 4), Last Man Standing (introduced in Season 4), Over The Limit (introduced in Season 5; since retired), Giants Unleashed (introduced in Season 5), Team Roadblock (introduced in Season 6; since retired), Clash of Champions (introduced in Season 6) War Games (Introduced in Season 7) Code Breaker (Introduced in Season 7), Team Stomping Grounds (Introduced in Season 7), Survivor (Introduced in Season 8), TLC (Introduced in Season 9), Campaign (Introduced in Season 10), Boom (Introduced in Season 11) and Super Showdown (Introduced in Season 12)

==== Wild Mode ====
In a wild match, the player has to set up a group of four male superstars, two female superstars, and two support cards. The player gets to pick from any cards that are unlocked between seasons 1-10. The player gets to choose from three opponents, which are similar to the player's tier. The game provides the number of matches won and lost by the opponent. After selecting an opponent, the player begins a match against the opponent's deck. All games of Wild are set inside the NXT arena in season 4. In season 3, they would be held in a gym or a bar with WWE logos throughout the venue. Each Wild match features a variety of matches in which the player selects one or two cards with or without a support card suiting to the one or two stats to be compared in the match and that the match is for the male superstars, female superstars, or tag teams. In such a game, there are usually three matches, each carrying one point, which goes to the winning player. A match can end in a tie, in which case both players earn one point each, possibly leading to a tie between the players. In such a case, there is an extra match and its winner wins the whole match. Each win awards the player two picks whereas a loss provides only one pick and a perfect 3–0 victory provides an extra pick which makes a total of three picks.

==== King of the Ring ====
In King of the Ring (KOTR), matches are simulated. The player builds a deck of eight superstars, two female superstars, and two support cards, which determines the player's tier and rewards. Then the AI matches up the player with 14 other players/bots and the player's lineup plays simulated matches with each of the opponent player's squad three times (not consecutively) in a particular order, with each match lasting 10 minutes and a gap of 50 minutes between matches. Half of the players of the deck is active and loses stamina (8 per match) and the other inactive half gains stamina (40 per match). With the decrease in stamina, the stats of a card decrease as well, so the player might use energy cards obtained from the card picks to fill a card's energy bar (players can gather up to 40) and the player might also use one or more of the stat boosts to increase the particular stat(s) of each card in the active part of the deck by 15 percent (players can gather five of each boost) for the next match only. After playing 45 matches, the top eight players move onto the contenders bracket and the quarter finals, where there are two or three consecutive matches between two players of the top eight each in order to find the winner. Players each receive KOTR rewards as per the position 45 minutes after their last matches.

In season 2, KOTR was changed so that the deck consists of seven superstars, three divas, and two support cards. Then the AI matches up the player with 15 other players/bots and the player's lineup plays simulated matches with each of the opponent player's squad three times (not consecutively) in a particular order with each match lasting 10 minutes and a gap of 50 minutes between each match. The full deck is in play, unlike Season 1. The stamina system is the same as in Season 1, except the total number of Energy cards that can be accumulated increased to 25 from 10. After playing 45 matches the top eight players move onto the contenders bracket and the quarter finals, where there are two or three consecutive matches between two players of the top 8 each in order to find the winner. Players each receive KOTR rewards as per the position 45 minutes after their last matches.

In Season 4, KOTR changed again. KOTR in Season 4 splits a total of 32 players into 4 teams of 8 people each with 2 sets of 16 players starting in either a 205 Live or NXT bracket. In season 4 KOTR, there are no more qualifying matches and all players are instead put straight into a contender's bracket where all four groups are displayed. Every time the player and/or some of the player's group members win, the player is rewarded for moving onto the next stage in the bracket and moves up to either the Raw or SmackDown bracket depending on which bracket the player advanced from. Players who came from the 205 Live bracket move up to the SmackDown bracket, while those in the NXT bracket move to the Raw bracket. However, losing players would be knocked out of the bracket and KOTR would end. KOTR in Season 4 takes just over a full day to complete, compared to the two or more days it took to complete in seasons 1–3. Rewards are given according to the player's KOTR tier.

==== People's Champion Challenge ====
In a PCC, players chose one of the two sides available and played to add wins to the superstar's side they chose to earn points. PCC matches were just like Wild Mode matches, but here, the player got only three opponents to choose from with wins awarding points that could be earned by defeating the opponent chosen. Also, players could earn title matches through card picks earned from PCC matches, which, upon use, doubled the points that could be earned by winning against any of the three opponents, but these cards reset the board of cards available for picking once one such card is found. Players earned points to move up in the rankings and, at the end of the event, players were awarded cards on the basis of the winning side and the players' rankings.

On May 21, 2020, WWE SuperCard added a similar event mode as People's Champion Challenge, named Clash of Champions (titled after the pay-per-view of the same name), sharing previous features from People's Champion Challenge such as choosing two different sides, and elements from different events such as Last Man Standing and Giants Unleashed. Like most modes, Clash of Champions has a bout system with a free bout every 15 minutes.

On February 8, 2024, WWE SuperCard brought back People's Champion Challenge with Triple H and The Undertaker being the superstars to choose from.

==== Road to Glory ====
In Road to Glory, the player must construct a team of 16 superstars, 4 female superstars, and 2 support cards. Before playing, players choose their opponents like they would with People's Champion Challenge to earn points. This mode works just like exhibition but with more matches. The mode is split in four rounds where each player is given four random cards. Play works like Wild Mode. After four rounds, the player who wins the most matches is the winner. Depending on the results of the match, the player can earn 3 to 9 draft picks on the board with a rare card or higher or a title match card resetting the board. After earning a certain number of points, the player can earn a card starting with WrestleMania 36 and work their way up to earn a special card that can only be obtained from the event. Like some other modes (i.e. Royal Rumble), this mode uses a bout system in which players can play five matches in a row. The player can earn a free match every 15 minutes or pay for bouts with credits.

==== Ring Domination ====
This mode consists of a deck made of 10 Superstars and 2 Support cards (no female superstars). The mode is played on a 3x3 grid (9 tiles), and the aim is to own the most tiles at the end of bout. Players start with a hand of six cards (and two support cards) dealt randomly from their decks. Placing a card in a tile controls the tile for the player, and the opponent may use the cards' alignment to challenge for a tile. The challenge is a single match between the two cards based on randomly selected attributes, and the winner of the match controls the loser's tile. This goes on until all nine tiles are filled with cards. The player with the most tiles is the winner. This mode is contested player vs AI; the winner receives four picks, and the loser receives two. The picks go towards unveiling a special card. Once the card is fully revealed, the player receives that card. There is a special "Pick Doubler" boost that can be found that doubles the picks received from the next bout (win or lose). There are five free bout slots to start, and a new free bout is available every 15 minutes if a slot is open.

==== Team People's Champion Challenge (discontinued) ====
This is an extension of the normal PK. A team is to be created consisting of four or more members to be eligible in the team PCC. Then there is a pool created of cards from each member. Each hand contains two superstars, one female superstar and one support card. Enhancements may or may not be contributed. When a Team CC starts, Every player has to choose a side, and the team will play for the side which has been chosen the most. But as in PCC, the winning superstar is the reward, irrespective of the team's choice.

The matchlock is like exhibition but each player gets three opponents to choose from with the points that can be earned by defeating the opponent instead of their tiers to determine the opponent's deck's difficulty level. Each deck will be randomly selected from the previously made pool of cards. Also one can earn title matches through card picks earned from PIC matches which upon use, triple the points that can be earned by winning against any of the three opponents but these cards reset the set of cards available for picking once one such card is found. The player earns points to move the team up in the rankings and at the end of the event is awarded cards on the basis of the winning side and the team's ranking.

Campaign Campaign Mode is an always-on, single-player experience that pits the player against a track of opponents that gradually increase in difficulty and intensity. As the player progresses through Campaign mode, the player must come up with crafty solutions to beat different challenges presented to the player along the way.

Campaign Mode is structured in a system of Stages, Bosses, and Maps. At the beginning of the Campaign, the player begins in the Rookie Map. Rookie is the first of three maps– those being Rookie, Amateur, and Pro. In each map, the player encounters 12 Bosses and 84 total Stages. As they complete each stage or boss, the player collects 1-3 Stars depending on their performance in the ring. All available stars in a map must be collected to advance to the next map.

Campaign works off of a variant of WILD Mode, presenting a challenge in each new stage.

== Seasons ==
=== Season 1 ===
On 14 August, 2014, WWE SuperCard officially released on IOS and Android. WWE SuperCard is a battle card game where the player would battle based on stats. The first season had 9 tiers Common, Uncommon, Rare, Super Rare, Ultra Rare, Epic, Legendary, Survivor and WrestleMania.

=== Season 2 ===
Season 2 introduced tokens and multi-charge enhancements to the cards, as well as a new tier, SummerSlam, named for WWE's annual August pay-per-view event. Additionally, the cards will level up skills with a feature called Play Levels. After Season 2 was introduced, Season 1 cards were made ineligible to play against Season 2 cards, additionally, the Fusion Chamber is used to convert higher-levels Season 1 cards into Season 2 cards.

=== Season 3 ===
In Season 3, several new modes were introduced. A Royal Rumble game mode is introduced, with players battling 15 cards against each other. New card tiers, Hardened, Elite and Ultimate, all with cards branded RAW, SmackDown! LIVE and NXT depending on the superstar and which brand they were on after the 2016 WWE brand split, and later, WrestleMania 33 and SummerSlam '17 and a ranked player vs. player mode were added. An emoji feature, referred to as Attitudes, was added to the game as well.

=== Season 4 ===
New Events added to Season 4 include an all-female Elimination Chamber and Women's Royal Rumble events. Live Player vs. Player modes have been merged into weekly leagues, where players can earn points and upgrades heading into the next week's league. New card tiers Beast, Monster, Titan, WrestleMania 34, Goliath, and SummerSlam '18, were made available as well.

Another new mode, Last Man Standing, launched on April 18, 2018, which now means players need to buy coins from the game to stand any chance of getting a card. The mode features increasingly challenging Arenas, and players compete to place on the leaderboard against others.

=== Season 5 ===
Season 5 has brought a completely new layout of the game, with the addition of being able to use multiple fusion chambers at once. In addition to this, three new tiers were added: Gothic, Neon and Shattered. In December, they announced the introduction of a new event, Over The Limit. It debuted on December 11, 2018 with an Elias event card. On April 3, 2019, WrestleMania 35 tier was added, and on June 12, 2019 the Cataclysm tier was added as well. In August 2019, the SummerSlam '19 tier was added.

=== Season 6 ===
More than 250 new cards have been added to the game across seven new tiers: Nightmare, Primal, Vanguard, Royal Rumble, WrestleMania 36, Elemental and Summerslam '20 with an all-new leveling system for Season 6 cards. There's also an all-new Performance Center feature to help players train their cards up faster and helps players play matches in the performance centre. On January 22, 2020 Royal Rumble tier was added, and WrestleMania 36 tier was added on March 25, 2020. Two new event modes were added in May when Women's Giants Unleashed launched on May 7, 2020 alongside Clash of Champions, which was released on May 21, 2020. On June 10, 2020, Elemental tier was added. Also, on August 20, 2020, Summerslam '20 tier was added. It included the debut cards of Santos Escobar, Timothy Thatcher, and Scarlett.

=== Season 7 ===
Over 200 new cards have been added to the game with three tiers; Bio-Mechanical, Swarm, & Behemoth, launched on November 18, 2020. Brand new features such as Styles and Techniques were added to the game to give players an advantage when they play with the new addition to the game. A new currency was launched named "SuperCoins", replacing previous currency such as Team Battleground Points, Money in the Bank Contracts, and League Points. A new solo event mode was launched on December 3, 2020 named WarGames, named after NXT Takeover WarGames match, where usually two teams compete against each other inside a cage. In the event, there are 3 three rounds, in which the player takes control of three rings at once, with the winner scoring the most points and a bonus addition of 20 points. WarGames has similar elements to Giants Unleashed, where the player climbs through the milestone rewards to obtain the event card, and elements of Road to Glory where both event modes have a set of points the player must acquire to obtain the event card. Like most event modes, WarGames has a bout system, with a free bout occurring every 15 minutes. On January 20, 2021, WWE SuperCard launched a new tier named Royal Rumble '21 (titled after the pay-per-view of the same name) with over 150 new cards. Also, New Special Event Cards that have been released are special 3:16 Stone Cold Steve Austin Royal Rumble '21 Cards along with the coming of Royal Rumble '21 Fusion cards. Also, there has been a Legion Of Doom Leak in the Royal Rumble '21 Event Cards. On March 31, 2021, WWE SuperCard launched the WrestleMania 37 tier, along with a "dusting" feature that allows useless cards to be dusted to fill a points meter towards accessing a special draft board with 16 possible picks on a 4-x-4 draft board. Picks on the exclusive board are only at most 3 tiers below a player's Top 8 tier, with one card guaranteed as a pull of their tier, unless the player is WrestleMania 37-WrestleMania 37++, in which case the top cards which can be drawn are Royal Rumble '21. On May 6, 2021, a new event titled CodeBreaker (with similar elements to Last Man Standing, Giants Unleashed, and Clash of Champions) was established, with the first event card being Kane. On June 9, 2021, WWE SuperCard launched the Forged tier, featuring over 70 cards. On August 11, 2021, WWE SuperCard released the SummerSlam '21 tier, with the first event card being The British Bulldog.

=== Season 8 ===
On November 17, 2021, WWE SuperCard launched its eighth season with three new tiers named Mire, Maelstrom, and Valhalla, with the first event card of the season being Roman Reigns. With the new season's launch, followed the new game mode called Survivor (titled after the pay-per-view of the same name), a 10-man elimination tournament similar to the King of the Ring game mode, where a player must overcome 9 players to be declared the Survivor Champion. In the tournament, a player can only win up to 2 losses, as the third loss marks the elimination of a player. On January 26, 2022, WWE SuperCard released the Royal Rumble '22 tier, with the first event card being Bron Breakker. On March 10, 2022, WWE SuperCard released the Road to WrestleMania tier with Ricochet being the event card. On March 30, a new game mode was launched, known as 24/7 Champion Mode. Based on the WWE 24/7 Championship, champions must be able to defend across all challengers, at any time. To become the champion, the player must successfully challenge for the championship. When players are the 24/7 Champion, they will be alerted by a referee icon at any given moment to warn the champion when a player is challenging for the player's championship. Losing the championship results from losing the title to another player or failing to defend the championship on time will lead to being stripped of the 24/7 Championship. Rewards are based on the successful title defenses a player has, the higher amount of victories, the better the rewards are. On June 1, 2022, WWE SuperCard launched the Ronin tier with over 170 cards available, alongside the first event card being Butch. On July 27, 2022, SummerSlam BCE tier was added. Also, on September 21, 2022, Arcane tier was added.

=== Season 9 ===
On November 16, 2022, WWE SuperCard launched its ninth season with three new tiers named Pixel, Extinction and Octane. On January 18, 2023, WWE SuperCard released the Royal Rumble '23 tier. On March 1, 2023, WWE SuperCard released the Battle Pass with rewards earned from the Free Pass or Premium Pass at a price of £19.89. On March 29, 2023, WWE SuperCard released the Wrestlemania 39 tier. On June 1, 2023, WWE SuperCard released the Myth tier. On August 2, 2023, WWE SuperCard released the SummerSlam '23 tier. On September 27, 2023, WWE SuperCard released the Pantheon tier.

=== Season 10 ===
On November 15, 2023, WWE SuperCard launched its tenth season with four new tiers Tempest, Detention, Noir, and Crucible. WWE SuperCard introduced a new mode named Wild Campaign where the player collects stars after every match and collects rewards. WWE SuperCard also introduced player levels that go from Level 1 to 54, with rewards increasing with each level. On December 20, 2023, WWE SuperCard released the Tundra tier. On January 10, 2024, WWE SuperCard released a CM Punk card for the first time. On January 24, 2024, WWE SuperCard released the Royal Rumble '24 tier. On March 27, 2024, WWE SuperCard released the WrestleMania 40 tier. On May 15, 2024, WWE SuperCard released the Enigma tier. On July 31, 2024, WWE SuperCard released the SummerSlam '24 tier. On September 19, 2024, WWE SuperCard released the Inferno tier.

=== Season 11 ===
On November 13, 2024, WWE SuperCard launched its eleventh season with five new tiers Metal, Ink, Invasion, Feral and Legion. WWE SuperCard introduced a new mode named Boom. WWE SuperCard also reset player levels based on what level the player reached in Season 10. On January 29, 2025, WWE SuperCard released the Royal Rumble '25 tier. On March 3, 2025, WWE SuperCard released the Dual tier. On April 16, 2025, WWE SuperCard released the Valor and WrestleMania 41 tiers. On May 30, 2025, WWE SuperCard released the Unhinged tier. On July 31, 2025, WWE SuperCard released the SummerSlam '25 tier. On September 17, 2025, WWE SuperCard released the Eon tier.

=== Season 12 ===
On November 12, 2025, WWE SuperCard launched its twelfth season with four new tiers Void, Ignition, Prize and Adventure. It also introduced a new game mode called Super ShowDown and another that refreshes every 24 hours called Crack the Case, in which players have 4 free guesses to decipher a 4-digit code which unlocks a Money in the Bank style briefcase containing rewards for solving it. In addition, players can earn a special edition card by unlocking a certain number of briefcases in a time span of approximately one month. On December 17, 2025, WWE SuperCard released Static tier. On January 28, 2026, WWE SuperCard released Royal Rumble '26 tier. As of the RR '26 tier update, cards which are combined to make a pro which both singles cards having 100/100 matches played will result in the pro version having 100/100 matches played instead of 0; furthermore, singles cards combined to make a pro which both singles cards have their Variant maximized will result in the pro card having a maximized Variant instead of the previously half completed Variant. On March 4, 2026, WWE SuperCard released Ember tier.

== Tiers/Rarities ==
In WWE SuperCard, there are 100 tiers/rarities.

(As of September 25, 2026)

Tiers/Rarities
Common S1
Uncommon S1
Rare S1
Super Rare S1
Ultra Rare S1
Epic S1
Legendary S1
Survivor S1
WrestleMania S1
Common S2
Uncommon S2
Rare S2
Super Rare S2
Ultra Rare S2
Epic S2
Legendary S2
Survivor S2
WrestleMania S2
SummerSlam
Hardened
Elite
Ultimate
WrestleMania 33
SummerSlam '17
Beast
Monster
Titan
WrestleMania 34
Goliath
SummerSlam '18
Gothic
Neon
Shattered
WrestleMania 35
Cataclysm
SummerSlam '19
Nightmare
Primal
Vanguard
Royal Rumble
WrestleMania 36
Elemental
SummerSlam '20
Bio-Mechanical
Swarm
Behemoth
Royal Rumble '21
WrestleMania 37
Forged
SummerSlam '21
Mire
Maelstrom
Valhalla
Royal Rumble '22
Road to WrestleMania
WrestleMania 38
Ronin
SummerSlam BCE
Arcane
Pixel
Extinction
Octane
Royal Rumble '23
WrestleMania 39
Myth
SummerSlam '23
Pantheon
Tempest
Detention
Noir
Crucible
Tundra
Royal Rumble '24
WrestleMania 40
Enigma
SummerSlam '24
Inferno
Metal
Ink
Invasion
Feral
Legion
Royal Rumble '25
Dual
Valor
WrestleMania 41
Unhinged
SummerSlam '25
Eon
Void
Ignition
Prize
Adventure
Static
Royal Rumble '26
Ember
Rewind
WrestleMania 42
Leviathan
SummerSlam '26
Centurion

== Reception ==
The game has a Metacritic score of 85 based on 7 critic reviews. As of May 2022, the game has been downloaded more than 26 million times.

TouchArcade wrote "For a new IP, WWE SuperCard manages to hang with the best of them. Even without purchasing cards left and right you can still enjoy yourself, which is great news for skeptics or WWE fans".

== See also ==
- List of licensed wrestling video games
- List of fighting games
- NJPW Collection
