= WWE 2K26 =

2026 professional wrestling video game

- Standard edition cover featuring CM Punk
- Developer: Visual Concepts (Note: Nintendo Switch 2 version ported by Shiver Entertainment)
- Publisher: 2K
- Series: WWE 2K
- Platforms: Nintendo Switch 2; PlayStation 5; Windows; Xbox Series X/S
- Release: March 13, 2026
- Genre: Sports
- Modes: Single-player, multiplayer

WWE 2K26 is a 2026 professional wrestling sports video game developed by Visual Concepts and published by 2K. It marks the 26th overall installment of the video game series based on WWE, the 12th game under the WWE 2K banner, and the successor to WWE 2K25. The standard edition was released worldwide on March 13, 2026, while the Attitude Era Edition, the King of Kings Edition, and the Monday Night War Edition was released via early access on March 6, 2026.

== Gameplay ==
Like its predecessor, WWE 2K26 retains an arcade-simulation hybrid gameplay style. The game marks the debut of the Dumpster match and the return of three gimmick match types: the "I Quit" match, the Inferno Match, and the 3 Stages of Hell match. Intergender matches, previously reintroduced in WWE 2K25, were expanded to all core game modes. Environmental interactivity was increased through the addition of stackable tables and new usable objects such as shopping carts and thumbtacks. The core mechanics underwent a significant overhaul, specifically regarding the reversal and stamina systems. The game's audiovisual presentation was also updated to include interactive entrances with controllable pyro and gestures and a new commentary team featuring Booker T and Wade Barrett joining the existing broadcast team, consisting of Michael Cole and Corey Graves, as previous commentator Byron Saxton was removed from the broadcast team for most modes in the game, due to his current role as a backstage reporter. Saxton remains a commentator in Island mode.

The 2K Showcase mode focuses on the career of CM Punk, featuring a narrative voiced by Punk himself that covers both his historical WWE highlights and "Fantasy Warfare" matches against various WWE legends, along with an option to take on a fictional 22 superstar intergender gauntlet match at the hypothetical CM Punkvillon arena as either Punk or AJ Lee against 21 other superstars with a chance to unlock all of the rewards without completing each match in the timeline. The game was also expanded to support additional brands, more wrestlers in matches, and more diverse match types. MyRise returns with a new narrative theme, entitled "The Comeback", and increased post-game replayability, allowing players to continue progression and unlock content after the main storylines conclude with title defenses. Universe Mode integrates the WWE Draft and a new "Universe Creation Wizard". Additionally, the mode features a "Watch Show" spectator option, expanded promo types, and refined Money in the Bank cash-in mechanics. The Island, an online hub introduced in the previous year's entry, features a revamped progression environment and a new "Scrapyard Brawl" area, as well as an option to choose between three "order" factions, consisting of CM Punk's Order of Anarchy, Rhea Ripley's Order of Shadows and Cody Rhodes' Order of Tradition, who in which fight for control of the Island, following the defeat of Roman Reigns at the end of the previous game's Island storyline. For the first time, The Island is available on Windows. MyGM also includes three new managers (Bobby Heenan, Stacy Keibler and the Anonymous General Manager).

The roster has been expanded to feature over 400 playable characters and for the first time in the series, superstars from WWE's sister promotion Lucha Libre AAA Worldwide (AAA) will be included as part of the new Ringside Pass mechanic, due to WWE's acquisition of AAA in April 2025. Also included in the roster is Take-Two Interactive CEO Strauss Zelnick, whose character model was quietly added in an update. The Nintendo Switch 2 version of WWE 2K26 includes platform-specific features designed for the console's hardware. Control options were expanded to include touchscreen and mouse support, specifically allowing for more precise input within the Creation Suite for face and body painting. The game also supports single Joy-Con play for local multiplayer. It incorporates GameShare and GameChat functionality, alongside full support for the Image Uploader and cross-platform Community Creations. Furthermore, the retail version will be released on a Game Key Card instead of having a code-in-a-box, as was the case with WWE 2K25.

== Development ==
On May 15, 2025, while reporting their results for the fourth quarter and 2025 fiscal year, 2K's holding company, Take-Two Interactive, confirmed WWE 2K26 as a title in their future lineup. The gameplay trailer was released on January 30, 2026 during that year's Royal Rumble.

In January 2026, ahead of the January 23 edition of WWE SmackDown, WWE Games shared a video on their social media channels of various superstars being interviewed and asked to name who they think will be the cover star for 2K26, with the caption encouraging fans to tune in, as "one can only imagine what the franchise has in store". During the episode, The Attitude Era Edition of the game was revealed through a teaser trailer featuring clips of Kane, The Rock, Stone Cold Steve Austin, and The Undertaker, among others from the era, although it did not show any gameplay or confirm a release date.

During the January 26, 2026 edition of Saturday Night's Main Event, the Monday Night War edition was confirmed, where it was further revealed that pre-orders for the title will begin to take place on January 30. Two days later, a third edition, The King of Kings Edition—titled after Triple H's nickname—was confirmed on January 26 when he shared a promotional video featuring himself and Paul Heyman to his account on X. During the 2026 Royal Rumble kickoff show on January 30, Michael Cole announced that CM Punk would be the cover athlete for the game's standard edition. This marked the second time Punk had been featured on the cover of a WWE video game, the first being WWE '13 in 2012.

The game's soundtrack features various artists and bands such as Linkin Park, Turnstile, Powerman 5000, Hanumankind, Ecca Vandal, Transplants, Andrew W.K., Bad Omens, Viagra Boys, Gatecreeper, The Warning, The Paradox, Better Lovers, Ho99o9, Jennie, and The Mistakes.

== Release ==
WWE 2K26 was set for worldwide release on March 13, 2026. The Attitude Era Edition, Monday Night War Edition, and King of Kings Edition of the game would be available in early access on March 6. The pre-order bonus included the "Joe Hendry Pack", which includes playable character Joe Hendry, themed attire, and digital items for the MyFACTION and The Island modes. Pre-orders for any edition of the game for PlayStation 5 (PS5), Xbox Series X/S, and Windows includes a digital copy of the standard edition of previous game WWE 2K25. Pre-orders of the "Attitude Era Edition" or the "Monday Night War Edition" on the PS5 or Xbox during the initial pre-order window (January 29 to February 23) include 15,000 VC in WWE 2K26 and 67,500 VC in WWE 2K25.

== Reception ==
Reception

Aggregate scores
| Aggregator | Score |
|---|---|
| Metacritic | (PS5) 80/100 (XSX) 79/100 (PC) 82/100 |
| OpenCritic | 79% recommend |

Review scores
| Publication | Score |
|---|---|
| GameSpot | 8/10 |
| GamesRadar+ | 3.5/5 |
| IGN | 7/10 |
| Push Square | 8/10 |
| Shacknews | 8/10 |

The PlayStation 5, Xbox Series X, and PC reviews of WWE 2K26 all received generally favorable reviews from critics, according to the review aggregation website Metacritic. Fellow review aggregator OpenCritic assessed that the game received strong approval, being recommended by 79% of critics. The game received heavy criticism for its monetization and its usage of Battle Passes (known as the Ringside Pass in the game) that locked previously base game content as well as DLC behind grinding/paying extra. 2K responded by changing the DLC to automatic unlocks and lowered the amount of EXP needed to achieve each level and gave everyone 20 levels for free.
