= WWF Superstars =

1989 video game

- Arcade flyer featuring the game's cast
- Developer: Technōs Japan
- Publisher: Technōs Japan
- Director: Yoshihisa Kishimoto
- Platform: Arcade
- Release: NA: May 1989; JP: October 1989
- Genre: Professional wrestling
- Modes: Single-player, multiplayer

WWF Superstars (Note: Japanese: WWFスーパースターズ, Hepburn: WWF Sūpāsutāzu) is a 1989 wrestling video game developed and published by Technōs Japan for arcades. It is the first WWF arcade game to be released. A series of unrelated games with the same title were released by LJN for the original Game Boy. Technōs followed the game with the release of WWF WrestleFest in 1991.

== Features ==
WWF Superstars features some of the signature moves and trademark mannerisms of the wrestlers in the game. There are also cut scenes featuring Ted DiBiase, André the Giant and Virgil. Mean Gene Okerlund, and Miss Elizabeth make appearances as well. Before the first match, the player's chosen team enters the arena via the "ring cart" seen at WrestleManias III and VI.

== Gameplay ==
Hulk Hogan and the Honky Tonk Man team up in a tag team match against Savage and Duggan.

Players select two wrestlers to form a tag team. The playable wrestlers are Hulk Hogan, "Macho Man" Randy Savage, The Ultimate Warrior, Big Boss Man, "Hacksaw" Jim Duggan, and The Honky Tonk Man. Up to two players can play at once. The players take their team through a series of matches with other tag teams in New York City and then Tokyo.

The game features a basic grappling and attack system. From a grapple, a player can either toss the opponent, throw them into the ropes, or go into a headlock from which two character-specific grapple moves can be performed. Each wrestler also possesses standing strikes, running attacks, running counterattacks, ground attacks, and moves from the top turnbuckle. A referee is present in the ring, but cannot be attacked or otherwise affected by the wrestlers.

It is also possible to brawl outside of the ring, provided the player reenters before a count of 20. There, a table can be picked up and swung at opponents. If both wrestlers go outside the ring at once, their tag team partners automatically jump out to join the fight. Occasionally one of these partners will wander off screen and return wielding a folding chair. Neither the chair nor table can be taken inside the ring.

After three matches are won, players get to challenge the Mega Bucks ("The Million Dollar Man" Ted DiBiase and André the Giant) for the final round. Most grapple moves do not work against André because of his immense size, although two specific grapple moves can be used on him, since they do not require him to be lifted: Honky Tonk Man's noogie and The Big Boss Man's headbutt. The Mega Bucks are not selectable characters, but there are cheats for MAME that allow them to be used (together or separately), the drawback being that if DiBiase or André get a submission victory, the game will think that the player lost. Also, there can sometimes be graphical errors which will make the in-ring opponent disappear.

If the player wins the title match, a newspaper headline heralding the players' tag team as champions is shown. The player is then taken through another series of three matches (one of which will feature DiBiase) in the other city and a final match against DiBiase and André before the game ends.

== Reception ==
In Japan, Game Machine listed WWF Superstars in their November 1, 1989 issue as being the third most successful table arcade unit of the month. In North America, it was the top-grossing software conversion kit on the RePlay arcade charts in January 1990.

== See also ==
- WWF WrestleMania, a home version of this title
- List of licensed wrestling video games
- List of fighting games
