= WWF WrestleFest =

1991 professional wrestling video game

- Arcade flyer featuring the game's cast
- Developer: Technōs Japan
- Publishers: JP/NA: Technōs Japan; JP/EU/AU: Tecmo
- Directors: Yoshihisa Kishimoto; Shinichi Saito
- Producer: Kunio Taki
- Platform: Arcade
- Release: June 1991: NA: June 1991; JP: October 1991; EU: November 1991; AU: 1991
- Genres: Sports, professional wrestling
- Modes: Single-player, multiplayer
- Arcade system: CPU: 68000, Z80; Sound chips: YM2151, MSM6295

WWF WrestleFest (Note: Japanese: WWFレッスルフェスト, Hepburn: WWF Ressuru Fesuto) is a professional wrestling video game developed and released by Technōs Japan for arcades in 1991, featuring stars of the World Wrestling Federation (WWF). The game was distributed by Technōs in Japan and North America, and by Tecmo in Japan, Europe and Australasia. It is the sequel to Technōs' previous WWF game, WWF Superstars. Compared to Superstars, WrestleFest adds a variety of different wrestlers to the roster as well as enhanced graphics and sound. There are more voice samples, including commentary and pre-match introductions by WWF ring announcer Mike McGuirk. The voiced cut scenes featuring Gene Okerlund from Superstars returned as well.

In February 2012, THQ released a remake of the game for iOS featuring both current and former wrestlers, retitled WWE WrestleFest.

== Gameplay ==
Hulk Hogan and Sgt. Slaughter team up against Ultimate Warrior and Big Boss Man.

Just like its predecessor, WrestleFest simulates professional wrestling matches. The game adds support for up to four simultaneous players and the ability to insert more credits into the machine to buy energy. Two modes of play are available. In the new Royal Rumble mode, the player picks one superstar and takes him through a Royal Rumble match. In Saturday Night's Main Event mode, the player must pick two wrestlers to form a tag team and take them through a series of matches, including a title match with the Legion of Doom. In this mode, players can perform numerous double team moves. Additionally, after a team member has been on the apron for a certain length of time, they will "power up", temporarily giving them the ability to win all grapples and inflict more damage than usual.

The game features ten selectable wrestlers. Hulk Hogan, Ultimate Warrior, Ted DiBiase and Big Boss Man return from WWF Superstars. Jake "The Snake" Roberts, Earthquake, Mr. Perfect, Sgt. Slaughter, Demolition Smash, and Demolition Crush, are available as new superstars, with The Legion of Doom (Hawk and Animal) making an appearance as a non-selectable boss tag team champions. Each wrestler has their own signature maneuvers.

== Reception ==
Reception

Review scores
Publication	Score
AllGame	4.5/5
Computer and Video Games	Positive
GameZone	3/5
Sinclair User	88%
Zero	3/5

Award
Publication	Award
Sinclair User	Best Beat'Em Up Game

In North America, RePlay reported WWF WrestleFest to be the second most-popular arcade game of the month in October 1991. It went on to be the highest-grossing arcade conversion kit of 1992 in the United States, according to the Amusement & Music Operators Association (AMOA). In Japan, Game Machine listed WWF WrestleFest on their December 1, 1991 issue as being the third most-popular arcade at the time.

Zero gave the game a 3 out of 5. While critical to the graphics being cartoony, they praised its gameplay. Sinclair User rated the game with an 88% score, citing the game's variety of characters and high replay value. Computer and Video Games also gave the game a positive review, describing the gameplay as enjoyable.

Sinclair User magazine awarded it "Best Beat'Em Up Game" in 1991, along with Konami's Vendetta.

== Follow-up titles ==
WWE WrestleFest
- Developer: THQ
- Publisher: WWE
- Platform: iOS
- Release: NA: February 2012
- Genres: Sports, professional wrestling

THQ released a remake of the game for iOS under the title WWE WrestleFest in February 2012. The remake introduced a roster composed of more contemporary WWE stars such as The Undertaker, John Cena, Randy Orton and Rey Mysterio, along with former performers including The Rock, Stone Cold Steve Austin, Jake Roberts and Randy Savage. In addition to the return of the Saturday Night's Main Event and Royal Rumble game modes, the remake also featured standard one-on-one, tag team, steel cage and gauntlet match types, along with online multiplayer. The game also included "Road to WrestleMania" mode, where the players could go through a series of matches to try to win various WWE titles. A series of downloadable content packs were released for the game, featuring additional wrestlers and arenas. Versions for the PlayStation 3, Xbox 360 and Android were also announced, but never released.

The 2021 title RetroMania Wrestling was heavily inspired by WrestleFest and was also promoted as a successor to the original arcade game.
