= WWE 2K25 =

2025 professional wrestling video game

- Standard edition cover featuring Roman Reigns and Paul Heyman
- Developer: Visual Concepts (Note: Nintendo Switch 2 version ported by Shiver Entertainment)
- Publisher: 2K (Note: Android and iOS version published by Netflix Games.)
- Series: WWE 2K
- Platforms: PlayStation 4; PlayStation 5; Windows; Xbox One; Xbox Series X/S; Nintendo Switch 2; Android; iOS
- Release: PS4, PS5, Windows, Xbox One, Xbox Series X/S; March 14, 2025; Nintendo Switch 2; July 23, 2025; Android, iOS; October 4, 2025
- Genre: Sports
- Modes: Single-player, multiplayer

WWE 2K25 is a 2025 professional wrestling sports video game developed by Visual Concepts and published by 2K. It is the twenty-fifth overall installment of the video game series based on WWE, the eleventh game under the WWE 2K banner, and the successor to WWE 2K24. It was released on March 14, 2025 for PlayStation 4, PlayStation 5, Windows, Xbox One, and Xbox Series X/S, was released on Nintendo Switch 2 on July 23, 2025, and was released on Android and iOS on October 4, 2025 by Netflix Games. It was also the final WWE 2K title to be released for the PlayStation 4 and Xbox One.

The game received generally favorable reviews, with critics praising incremental improvements such as chain wrestling and other additions across its modes, although criticizing its new "The Island" mode (modeled after "The City" from sister franchise NBA 2K) for being underdeveloped and overemphasizing character upgrades purchased via microtransactions. A follow up title, WWE 2K26, was released March 13, 2026.

== Gameplay ==
WWE 2K25 largely builds on the mechanics of its predecessor, including the returning "Chain Wrestling" mechanic, the new "Giant" class of wrestler (which have an additional life bar that must be drained before they are able to take damage), and new gimmick match modes such as "Underground" and "Bloodline Rules" (a no-disqualifications match inspired by the WrestleMania XL night 2 main event, which gives the wrestlers an ability granting up to three run ins who stay in the ring after they have been summoned). 2K25 is the first entry in the WWE 2K franchise to support intergender matches since WWE SmackDown vs. Raw 2009.

The Showcase mode is themed around The Bloodline and the Anoaʻi family, highlighting members such as Rikishi, Roman Reigns, Tamina Snuka, The Usos (Jimmy and Jey), and Yokozuna. MyFaction, MyGM, and Universe mode also make returns, with MyGM adding support for online simulation matches, alongside the addition of eight new managers (Ava, Nick Aldis, Shawn Michaels, Sensational Sherri, Miss Elizabeth, Armando Estrada, Mr. Fuji and CM Punk) and a new brand, NXT Mutiny, a fictional version of NXT, which was under control by Mutiny, as shown in MyRise's Munity storyline, and Universe reinstating support for promos. The MyRise campaign mode, entitled "Mutiny", follows a group of NXT wrestlers, known as "Mutiny", attempting to take over Raw and SmackDown for control of WWE. A new mode known as "The Island", which is exclusive to PS5, Xbox Series X/S and Nintendo Switch 2, is an online PvPvE mode modelled after "The City" from recent NBA 2K games, which takes place in a Samoa-inspired setting and uses players' custom wrestlers.

== Development ==
During the Raw premiere on Netflix on January 6, during a segment with Roman Reigns and Paul Heyman, WWE 2K25 was teased after Reigns told Heyman of his plans of having a massive platform to "acknowledge" the entire world as the "Tribal Chief", following his victory over Solo Sikoa in a Tribal Combat match, on January 27. On that aforementioned date, on an episode of Raw, Heyman revealed that Reigns would be the standard edition's main cover star for WWE 2K25. 2K then released a trailer the following day showcasing gameplay, special edition game covers, and upcoming dates for pre-orders.

On February 6, IGN released the first full gameplay trailer.

The game was announced to have cross-platform play, with the last gen players (including PC) being able to play together and the current gen players being able to play together — but once the game came out players were unable play against players from other systems. The mention of cross-platform play was removed from promotional material, and it never ended up coming to the game.

== Release ==
WWE 2K25 was released on March 14, 2025; pre-order bonuses included a digital copy of WWE 2K24, and five Wyatt Sicks persona cards for MyFaction. Two deluxe versions were also announced: the "Deadman Edition" included the pre-order bonuses and additional content and cosmetics related to The Undertaker, while the "Bloodline Edition" was a superset of the Deadman Edition that includes additional Bloodline and WrestleMania 41-themed content (including the WrestleMania 41 arena), and early access to the game beginning March 7.

On July 1, 2025, 2K announced that a Nintendo Switch 2 version would be released on July 23, 2025, making 2K25 the first mainline WWE game to release on a Nintendo platform since WWE 2K18, as well as the first on a Nintendo platform in general since WWE 2K Battlegrounds. A retail release will include a download code inside instead of a Game Key card.

On October 4, 2025, Netflix released the mobile version, called WWE 2K25: Netflix Edition for Android and iOS, making 2K25 the first mainline WWE game to release on mobile since WWE 2K, which was the mobile version of WWE 2K15.

In October 2025, a John Cena-centric "Farewell Tour" DLC was released in honor of his upcoming retirement from WWE, including new skins based on his "Doctor of Thugonomics" and "Last Real Champion" (WrestleMania 41) gimmicks, Brock Lesnar, and R-Truth's "Ron Cena" alter ego, as well as Farewell Tour T-shirt cosmetics. The game was concurrently reissued in a "Farewell Tour Edition" including this and all existing DLC.

== Reception ==
Reception

Aggregate scores
Aggregator	Score
Metacritic	(PS5) 80/100 (XSXS) 84/100 (NS2) 78/100
OpenCritic	87% recommended (Note: Based on 91 critic reviews.)

Review scores
Publication	Score
Destructoid	8/10
Digital Trends	3.5/5
Game Informer	8.25/10
GameSpot	8/10
GamesRadar+	4/5
Hardcore Gamer	4/5
IGN	8/10
Push Square	8/10
Shacknews	8/10
Video Games Chronicle	4/5
Quest Daily	7.5/10
Game Rant	9/10

WWE 2K25 received "generally favorable reviews", according to review aggregator website Metacritic. On OpenCritic, the game received a "strong" rating according to 87 percent of critics' recommendations.

IGN felt that the game was improved over 2K24, noting that "it looks fantastic, still feels good, and there's a lot of it, including small but welcome updates like intergender matches or bigger updates like the new MyRise and Showcase modes"—with the latter being complimented for presentation improvements (such as in-engine cutscenes for in-match scenes that had used archive footage in 2K24). The Island was considered to be a "cool idea" with possibilities, but was criticised as being "mostly quiet, empty, and boring" in execution, and containing multiplayer PvP fights that were largely pay-to-win and dominated by "whales who will spend inordinate amounts to make their customized wrestlers beasts off the bat."

GameSpot was similarly positive, noting that changes such as chain wrestling allowed matches to play out more like those seen in actual shows, felt that the "Giant" archetype (which was compared to heavily-armored enemies seen in shooter games such as Destiny and The Division) demonstrated Visual Concepts' "keen understanding" of the differences between wrestling, other sports games, and traditional fighting games, and praised Paul Heyman's performance as host of the Showcase mode. It was noted that the MyRise storyline "awkwardly exists with a foot both in and out of kayfabe, telling a story that doesn't make a heck of a lot of sense if you look past the surface", while The Island was criticized as "simply awful" for being underdeveloped and emphasizing upgrades made with microtransactions.

The Academy of Interactive Arts & Sciences nominated WWE 2K25 for "Fighting Game of the Year" at the 29th Annual D.I.C.E. Awards.
