= ECW Hardcore Revolution =

2000 video game

- PlayStation cover featuring Rob Van Dam with the chair kick against Jerry Lynn at Living Dangerously
- Developers: Acclaim Studios Salt Lake City; Crawfish Interactive (GBC)
- Publisher: Acclaim Entertainment
- Director: Rick Dearr
- Designers: Scott Shicoff; Tim Huntsman; Jeff Robinson
- Programmer: Daren Smith
- Artist: David Christenson
- Composers: Andre Hoth; Dean Morrell; Nelson Everhart; Mike Tekulve; Keith Fox
- Platforms: Game Boy Color; Nintendo 64; PlayStation; Dreamcast
- Release: Game Boy Color, Nintendo 64, PlayStation: NA: February 17, 2000; EU: March 3, 2000; Dreamcast: NA: February 29, 2000; EU: March 17, 2000
- Genre: Sports
- Modes: Single-player, multiplayer

ECW Hardcore Revolution is a professional wrestling video game released by Acclaim Entertainment, based on the professional wrestling promotion Extreme Championship Wrestling (ECW). The game was released for the Nintendo 64, PlayStation, Game Boy Color, and Dreamcast in 2000. It was the first wrestling game to be based on ECW, as well as the first professional wrestling video game to receive a Mature rating from the ESRB, although the Game Boy Color version was rated Everyone. Acclaim followed this title with the release of a sequel, ECW Anarchy Rulz, in August 2000.

== Gameplay ==
Gameplay for ECW Hardcore Revolution is identical to WWF Attitude. Much of the content was the same, but with ECW images replacing all WWE owned material. The match rules are also retained.

Two (or more) participants attempt to meet one of the win conditions over their rival/s. They can reduce their opponent's resistance by decreasing their health. This is done by performing successful attacks and reversals.

- Pin - Performing a pin cover on a downed opponent, or using a pinning move, to hold their shoulders down while the referee counts to three. Pin attempts are only valid within the ring. They are automatically voided if interrupted or either player touches the ring ropes.
- Submission - Using a painful hold on a weakened opponent until they give up. These only work under same conditions as pin attempts.
- Count Out - Whenever a player leaves the ring for any reason, the referee begins a silent count to 10. The count resets each time a player leaves the ring. Any players outside of the ring whenever the referee reaches 10 is defeated. It is possible for all players to lose by count out. These rarely happened in ECW.
- TKO - If a player's health meter is completely depleted, they can be eliminated automatically. This option needs to be turned on in utilities.
- Decree of ECW - This is a three-point system that is used if the time limit expires before anyone has met the other win conditions. The first determines who has the most remaining health. If this does not determine a clear winner, then the player with the most health who performed the most successful attacks, taunts and reversals is the winner. If this still does not produce a clear winner, then the player who meets those conditions and has the lowest player number is the winner.
- DQ - This only occurs if a human controlled player wins a versus match after calling for their ally. Their opponent may be awarded the win by disqualification (DQ).

Nearly all of the main characters were performers and staff members involved with ECW during the game's production. Some personalities who had left the company before or during the production were left in as unlockable content. The additional "jobber" characters are loosely based on other ECW or Acclaim staff, or are completely fictional.

The season mode is similar to the one used in WWF Attitude. The player(s) must win matches to move up the rankings before they can challenge for championship titles at pay-per-view events. In 'Versus' career, the player must first challenge for the fictional Acclaim Championship. After clearing the first tier, the player moves on to the ECW Television Championship division, and then the ECW World Heavyweight Championship. The tag team career only allows players to compete for the ECW World Tag Team Championships.

The game features all of the attacks and taunts that appeared in WWF Attitude, with some renamed, as well as some new ones. However, many of the added moves are just duplicates of moves that are already in the game. For example, Danny Doring's finisher "Whambam Thankyou Maam" is identical to the "Double Arm DDT".

One of the unique features is that match commentary is performed by Joey Styles alone. This is one of the very few wrestling video games in existence to use just one commentator.

== Reception ==
Reception

Aggregate score
Aggregator	Score			
Aggregator	Dreamcast	GBC	N64	PS
GameRankings	44%	38%	57%	55%

Review scores
Publication	Score			
Publication	Dreamcast	GBC	N64	PS
AllGame	2/5	1/5	2/5	1/5
CNET Gamecenter	3/10	N/A	N/A	N/A
Electronic Gaming Monthly	N/A	N/A	6.75/10 (Note: Four critics of Electronic Gaming Monthly gave the Nintendo 64 version each a score of 6.5/10, 7.5/10, 5/10, and 8/10.)	N/A
Game Informer	7.75/10	2/10	8/10	8.25/10
GameFan	N/A	N/A	53% (Note: In GameFan's viewpoint of the Nintendo 64 version, three critics gave it each a score of 63, 50, and 47.) (G.N.) 50% (R.M.) 40%	46% (Note: In GameFan's viewpoint of the PlayStation version, three critics gave it each a score of 45, 40, and 53.)
GameRevolution	D+	N/A	N/A	N/A
GameSpot	5.6/10	4.5/10	4.2/10	4.2/10
GameSpy	2/10	N/A	N/A	N/A
Hyper	N/A	N/A	55%	N/A
IGN	6.9/10	3/10	5/10	4/10
N64 Magazine	N/A	N/A	80%	N/A
Next Generation	1/5	N/A	1/5	N/A
Nintendo Power	N/A	N/A	5.9/10	N/A
Official U.S. PlayStation Magazine	N/A	N/A	N/A	1.5/5

The Nintendo 64 and PlayStation versions received mixed reviews, while the Dreamcast and Game Boy Color versions received unfavorable reviews, according to the review aggregation website GameRankings.

Critics praised Joey Styles' commentary, and the use of weapons during the game. However, many reviews criticized Revolution for being a near copy of its predecessors, WWF Attitude and War Zone, and not reflecting ECW's unique style, just covering over everything with ECW wrestlers and themes. Daniel Erickson of NextGen gave the Dreamcast and Nintendo 64 versions negative reviews in two separate issues, calling the latter "One of the few games to inspire active anger and hate. Just having to handle the cart with our bare fingers made us feel dirty" (#63, March 2000); and later calling the former "A blatant insult to the intelligence of wrestling fans and Dreamcast owners" (#65, May 2000).

In one review, Lamchop of GamePro said of the PlayStation version, "If you liked Attitude and you're a big ECW fan, then you'll like ECW Hardcore Revolution—but there's little evolution here. It has a different name, but it's pretty much the same game." (Note: GamePro gave the PlayStation version two 3/5 scores for graphics and sound, 4/5 for control, and 3.5/5 for fun factor in one review.) In another review, Lou Gubrious said of the same console version, "For all of you who liked WWF Attitude and wanted to see an ECW game, this was designed for you. Non-wrestling fans might want to rest their thumbs with a less-complex grappler like WCW Mayhem or the upcoming WWF SmackDown!." (Note: GamePro gave the PlayStation version 4/5 for graphics, 3.5/5 for sound, and two 3/5 scores for control and fun factor in another review.) Jake The Snake said in one review that the Nintendo 64 version "is so much like Attitude, you should stick with the latter (or WWF WrestleMania 2000) unless you're a huge ECW fan or [you] must have every wrestling game that comes along." (Note: GamePro gave the Nintendo 64 version two 4/5 scores for graphics and fun factor, and two 3.5/5 scores for sound and control in one review.) However, The D-Pad Destroyer said of the same console version in another review, "Attitude fans who dig the ECW might want to give this one a look, but if you really want to play ECW wrestlers, then try to create them in Wrestlemania 2000 [sic] or Mayhem. In an age where both wrestling games and wrestling itself are centering on the show behind the sport, Acclaim's difficult and bland engine is showing its age." (Note: GamePro gave the Nintendo 64 version 4/5 for graphics, and three 3.5/5 scores for sound, control, and fun factor in another review.) Later on, Lamchop said that the Dreamcast version "isn't an improvement over Attitude. In fact, it heads in the other direction with less-popular wrestlers and done-this-before gameplay. Only hardcore ECW fans should pick this one up; everybody else should keep their Attitude." (Note: GamePro gave the Dreamcast version 4/5 for graphics, and three 3/5 scores for sound, control, and fun factor.)

The Game Boy Color version was heavily criticized by critics and fans alike. Players complained about sluggish controls, poor sound effects and graphics and glitches. It was rated as one of the two worst GBC games of all time by MobyGames.

After the first week of the game's US release, ECW Hardcore Revolution peaked at No. 2 on NPD Group's weekly PlayStation sales chart. It also peaked at No. 6 on NPD Group's weekly Nintendo 64 sales chart. Overall, the game's versions collectively sold over 600,000 units within a month of its release. Acclaim also noted that ECW Hardcore Revolution was one of the top rental titles in the few weeks after its release.

== Characters ==
This game has up to 55 wrestlers: 51 males and 4 females.

- Amish Roadkill
- Arms Master
- Axl Rotten
- Balls Mahoney
- Beulah McGillicutty (female wrestler)
- Big Sal E. Graziano
- Bill Alfonso
- Brian Santoro
- C.W. Anderson
- Charlie Bruzzese
- Chris Chetti
- Cyrus the Virus
- Dastardly Danny Doring
- Dawn Marie Bytch (female wrestler)
- Excel
- Francine (female wrestler)
- Harry Slash
- Jack Victory
- Jason
- Jazz (female wrestler)
- Jerry Lynn
- Joel Gertner
- Joey Styles
- Judge Jeff Jones
- Justin Credible
- Lance Storm
- Little Guido Maritato
- Little Spike Dudley
- Louie Spicolli
- Mack Daddy
- Mad Goat
- Mike Awesome
- New Jack
- Nova
- Nurse Ratchett
- Raven
- Rhino
- Rob Van Dam
- Ron Buffone
- Sabu
- The Sheik
- Simon Diamond
- Skull
- Sound Guy Randy
- Spanish Angel
- Steve Corino
- Super Crazy
- Taz
- Tommy Dreamer
- Tommy Rich
- Tony Devito
- Tracy Smothers
- Trainer
- Wild Bill
- Yoshihiro Tajiri

== See also ==
- List of licensed wrestling video games
- List of fighting games
