= Attitude Era =

Adult-oriented period of WWF (now WWE) (1997–2002)

The WWF Attitude logo, officially used from November 9, 1997 to May 6, 2002

The Attitude Era was a major era of professional wrestling within the World Wrestling Federation (WWF, now WWE), succeeding the New Generation Era. The Attitude Era was characterized by adult-oriented content, which included increased depicted violence, profanity, and sexual content, as well as disregarding the "good guys versus bad guys" formula in favor of unpredictable and shocking storylines, in a significant shift from the "traditional" and family-friendly output that the WWF had produced up until that point. The Attitude branding officially lasted from November 9, 1997 (Survivor Series 1997) to May 6, 2002 (renaming of WWF to WWE), and was succeeded by the Ruthless Aggression Era.

The era was spearheaded during the Monday Night War when WWF's Raw went head-to-head with rival World Championship Wrestling's (WCW) Nitro in a weekly battle for television ratings. As part of the change, the WWF also rebranded its flagship show (which became Raw Is War), redesigned the arena setups, and later introduced the "scratch" logo and officially referred to and promoted the "Attitude" name. The Attitude Era was a highly successful boom period for the company with television ratings, merchandise sales, and pay-per-view buy rates for the WWF reaching record highs and it also came at a time of a general shift in American television moving away from family-friendly to "edgier" content, with the WWF pushing the limits of what was deemed acceptable for television. Bret Hart, Shawn Michaels, Sycho Sid and Stone Cold Steve Austin were among the wrestlers that ushered in the Attitude Era, with events such as Hart's explicit rant, the formation of D-Generation X and the Montreal Screwjob being key points of evolution to the Attitude format. However, Hart and Sid both left the WWF at the dawn of the era, and Michaels retired soon after.

Steve Austin would go on to become a major superstar of the Attitude Era and was joined by many new stars including The Rock, Triple H, Kane, Mick Foley (in various personas), Chyna and Kurt Angle, whereas The Undertaker continued to be popular as a veteran, and the company's chairman Vince McMahon would form a villainous persona out of himself, involving his real-life family in storylines. The Austin–McMahon feud was one of the longest-running and most prominent rivalries of the era. WWF also signed a number of wrestlers who left WCW during this boom period, including Chris Jericho, Eddie Guerrero, Chris Benoit, and the Big Show. In addition, the WWF Women's Championship was reactivated in September 1998 after years of dormancy, and most of the company's female talent, such as Sable, Sunny and Stacy Keibler during this time period were marketed as sex symbols booked in sexually provocative gimmick matches (e.g., "bra and panties", bikini, lingerie, etc.), whereas prominent female stars such as Chyna, Lita, and Trish Stratus were presented as serious wrestlers. The era also saw the resurgence of tag team wrestling, namely The Hardy Boyz, The Dudley Boyz, and Edge & Christian, who were featured in several destructive, physical and stunt-filled Tables, Ladders and Chairs matches during this era. Distinguished stables that were established in this era include D-Generation X, Nation of Domination, The Corporation, Ministry of Darkness, Corporate Ministry and The Brood, and had developed major rivalries among each other. Also, the Hardcore Championship was established in November 1998, a chaotic division involving no disqualification, falls count anywhere matches that would start ringside and then would be taken outside, with blunt weapons involved.

== Initiation ==
The actual start of the Attitude Era itself is often debated among fans; Vince McMahon's promo on the December 15, 1997 episode of Raw about not being "passé" is usually the latest point in time. WWE themselves retrospectively claim that the start of the era is hard to pinpoint, and have used inconsistent events to categorize the era. In 2017 and 2021 respectively, the WWE released DVD and Blu-ray compilations named 1997 - Dawn of the Attitude and 1996 - Prelude to Attitude, signifying that the era was, in yearly terms, beginning in 1997.

It is generally considered that the start of the Attitude era was gradual rather than immediate, based on different elements: the year 1996 saw the WWF increasing graphic violence and selling sex among its female talent, while the year 1997 saw the major aesthetic makeover, the normalisation of crude language and behavior, and the beginning of dramatised plots. General consensus is that the era (incorporating all these elements) had fully begun during the second half of 1997. In the years following, the Attitude era continued to evolve and experiment with ever more violent and crude content.

=== Background ===
During the New Generation Era of the mid-1990s, the World Wrestling Federation was at a difficult point following the steroid scandal against its chairman Vince McMahon, the loss of some of its stars to rival WCW, and a difficult financial situation. In the Monday Night War, a television ratings battle between WWF's Monday Night Raw and WCW's Monday Nitro, the WCW had the upper hand. The former WWF megastar, Hulk Hogan, had also been enjoying success at WCW as part of the nWo with its distinctly "edgy" nature. This also coincided with societal acceptance of racier television content occurring in the latter half of the 1990s, strongly influenced by NYPD Blue and amplified by The Jerry Springer Show, which had become exceptionally popular in 1997. Kevin Eck wrote in a The Baltimore Sun column in 1997:

The kids of the '80s who grew up rooting for All-American good guys like Hulk Hogan, they say, are now jaded twentysomethings who worship Marilyn Manson, Howard Stern, and Dennis Rodman. They're looking for something more real, more dangerous, the kind of entertainment they can now find in fringe "sports" like Extreme Championship Wrestling [ECW] and The Ultimate Fighting Championship [UFC].

=== Prelude ===
Multiple on-screen moments and elements in 1995 and 1996 have been credited with helping WWF transition from the New Generation Era into the Attitude Era such as the incorporation of mild foul language, reality based angles like Shawn Michaels collapsing on the November 20th edition of RAW, Goldust's introduction, the debut of Mankind, ECW's influence and Diesel transitioning into an anti-authority tweener character, often cited by fans as the spiritual precursor to the rebellious gimmick Stone Cold Steve Austin would later embody.

==== Sex appeal and Goldust ====
In his book, Vince Russo mentions the debut of the character Goldust on October 22, 1995 as a pivotal turning point, due to Goldust's controversial homoerotic undertones. The WWF then begun playing up female sexuality with Sunny, who appeared in sexualized skimpy outfits on and off the ring, including at Royal Rumble, and began to be pushed in other WWF media and suggestive Raw segments. WrestleMania XII also saw the debut on-screen appearances of Sable, who often dressed in suggestive leather outfits, and Marlena (who was also the manager of Goldust). Rather than being serious wrestlers, all three were normally ringside valets and personas, used for sex appeal. Both Sunny and Sable also appeared in Playboy-like suggestive shots for the official RAW Magazine (marketed to "Mature Readers" as opposed to the WWF Magazine) published by the WWF through 1996. Also in that year's SummerSlam pay-per-view, all three of them featured in a bikini contest. Sexualization was also pushed in comedic stunts by Sunny and Marlena in the first couple of episodes of Shotgun Saturday Night.

==== Birth of Austin 3:16 ====
After "Stone Cold" Steve Austin debuted at the WWF, he would go on to win the 1996 King of the Ring tournament by defeating Jake "The Snake" Roberts. In his post-win ad-libbed speech, Austin mocked Roberts' recital of the biblical passage John 3:16 by saying, "You sit there and you thump your Bible, and you say your prayers, and it didn't get you anywhere! Talk about your Psalms, talk about John 3:16... Austin 3:16 says I just whipped your ass!" Austin's rebellious, anti-hero attitude and delivery was well received by crowds, signifying a change in public taste (this was also evident by Sycho Sid's reception as a heel at Survivor Series). The speech is referenced by some fans as being the actual start of the Attitude era, both because of the nature of the speech (which was uncharacteristic for its time) and the fact that Austin would eventually become the biggest star at the peak of the Attitude era, with "Austin 3:16" becoming the major marketing tool for WWF during the era.

==== Pillman and match violence ====
Brian Pillman, who joined the WWF in June 1996, carried over his "Loose Cannon" persona from ECW as a deranged, unpredictable character, and provided segments that would later define the Attitude era. The infamous "Pillman's got a gun" segment on Raw on November 4, 1996, was an uncharacteristically dark angle, and has also been viewed as a key moment of change within the company, although Pillman and the WWF did issue a public apology after the segment, with McMahon admitting at the time that they went too far. Another new uncanny gimmick introduced that year was Mankind (himself also formerly of ECW), who feuded with The Undertaker and fought physically fierce matches with such as the Boiler Room Brawl at SummerSlam, the earliest example of the sort of backstage brawls and hardcore matches that would later become fundamental to the Attitude era. Mankind also used his disturbed persona to invoke unusual violent tactics in his main event match against Shawn Michaels at In Your House 10: Mind Games.

=== Consolidation ===
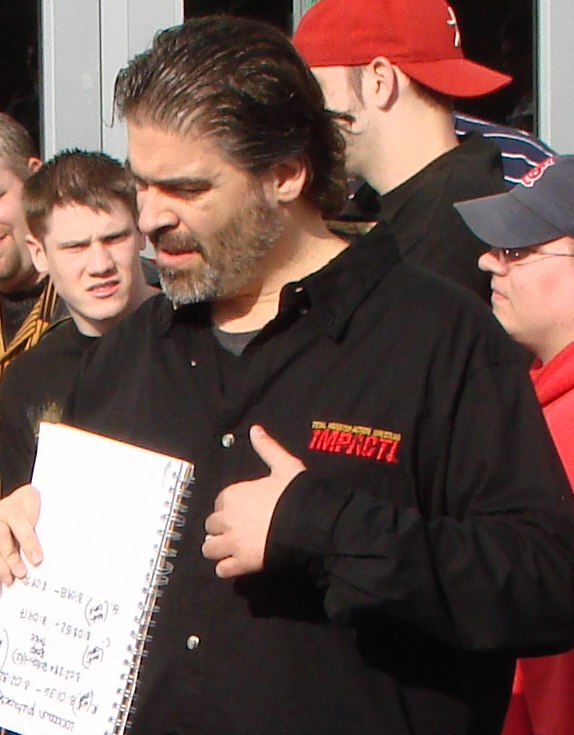
Vince Russo

The company's Raw program continued to struggle for US ratings in the Monday Night War in early 1997. This led to Vince McMahon's full embrace of a new direction that would build the Attitude Era, partly convinced by Vince Russo who then joined the creative writing team for Raw, significantly altering the nature of the wrestling, and Raw's production was completely refreshed to fit the target theme. In an effort to revamp itself, the company began to transition from the "traditional way" wrestling had long been presented, instead opting for a product which "pushed the envelope" according to then-head writer Russo.

The creative side of the product during the era's early stages in 1997 was spearheaded by Russo, who drastically changed the way WWF television was written. Ed Ferrara would later join Russo in June 1998, when he was hired by the WWF. Russo's and Ferrara's booking style has been described as "Crash TV", where they contributed edgy, controversial storylines involving sexual content, profanity, swerves, unexpected heel turns, and worked shoots, as well as short matches, backstage vignettes, shocking angles and levels of depicted violence. Vince McMahon commented in a May 1997 interview that the "taste of the American public changes from time to time" and "If their tastes change, so too will the direction of our company." McMahon had already started a working relationship with hardcore wrestling promotion ECW as early as September 1996, which influenced the Attitude Era.

==== Raw arena rework and Bret's tirade ====
The Raw Is War name was used during this period.

The WWF also refreshed branding and visual production. The March 10, 1997 episode of Raw debuted a new look and theme centered solely around the colors red and black, along with the renaming of Monday Night Raw to Raw Is War (suggested to signify that the WWF was waging "war" with WCW's Monday Nitro) and being extended to two hours, with the second hour dubbed the "War Zone". Production within the arenas also changed significantly: pyrotechnics were utilized for everyone and at the start of every show and lighting effects were altered. The ring rope colors were changed from red, white and blue to monocolor (and the turnbuckles changed from blue to black), and the wrestlers' entrance was redesigned to one featuring a long ramp, while the Titantron video display appeared for the first time, with Sycho Sid being the first wrestler to enter using it. These aesthetic changes would make their way onto other WWF events as well.

One week later, on the March 17 episode (and the week before WrestleMania 13), after losing a steel cage match against Sycho Sid in an attempt to win back the WWF Championship, Bret Hart angrily shoved Vince McMahon to the mat during a post-match interview and went into a profanity-laced tirade. Both the WWF and the USA Network apologized for the language, which included the words "goddamn" and "bullshit", including commentator Jim Ross while on air, and it led to the USA Network introducing a seven-second delay in order to bleep out offensive language. Some fans have referenced Hart's uncensored tirade and marking the start of the Attitude era.

==== WrestleMania and rise of Stone Cold ====
"Stone Cold" Steve Austin began a long-term feud with one of WWF's top superstars, Bret Hart, from late-1996 to mid-1997. They faced each other for the first time at Survivor Series and although Austin lost, the match was well received and it made Austin popular among fans despite being a heel. Their feud then climaxed in a Submission Match at WrestleMania 13, with a rare double-turn, turning Hart (who had been a traditional 'good guy' at the WWF for a long time) into a heel. Austin skyrocketed in public popularity after the Wrestlemania match and he had already become a household name by the middle of 1997. The match has also been cited by some as starting the Attitude era.

In a symbolic moment of the company's change, at the 1997 Slammy Awards, Austin beat up a returning Doink the Clown. Later, a storyline involving Owen Hart and Austin culminated in performing a Stone Cold Stunner on Vince McMahon to a positive crowd response, resulting to Austin being kayfabe arrested on the September 22, 1997 episode of Raw.

==== Darker storylines and DX ====
Darker and more dramatic storylines began to be regularly implemented on WWF programming by mid-1997, such as Paul Bearer's implication that The Undertaker had murdered his own family (which would build on to the debut of Kane). The existing Nation of Domination stable was in quick succession joined by the Disciples of Apocalypse, Los Boricuas and The Truth Commission, which all began feuding with each other in "gang wars" with racial undertones from July 1997. Around the same time began a feud between Goldust and Brian Pillman, where at Ground Zero: In Your House Pillman attempted to "win" Goldust's wife Marlena to use as his personal "sex slave". Kayfabe began to be regularly broken, and the cartoonish gimmicks that had previously been the mainstay of WWF superstars were mostly eliminated by the latter half of 1997.

The D-Generation X stable formed in August 1997, made up of Shawn Michaels, HHH and Chyna, and were noted for their shocking segments and crudeness, such as playing strip poker in the ring (December 8, 1997 episode or Raw) - these elements would define the Attitude era. Their feud with the Hart Foundation, led by Michaels's arch-rival Bret Hart, was notable for being one of the first major heel against heel storylines in the WWF.

==== Bret vs. Shawn, Montreal Screwjob, and logo rework ====
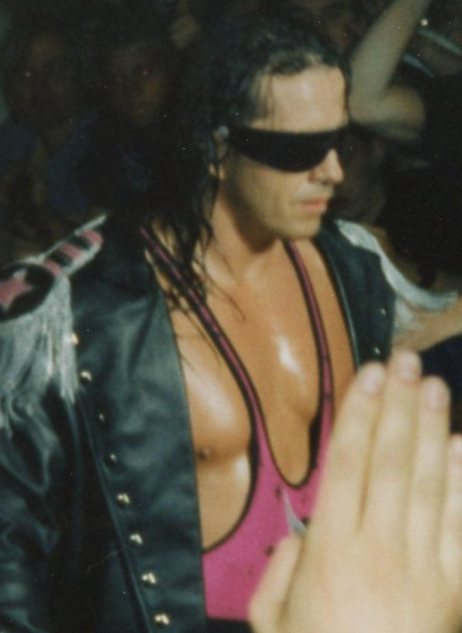
Bret Hart

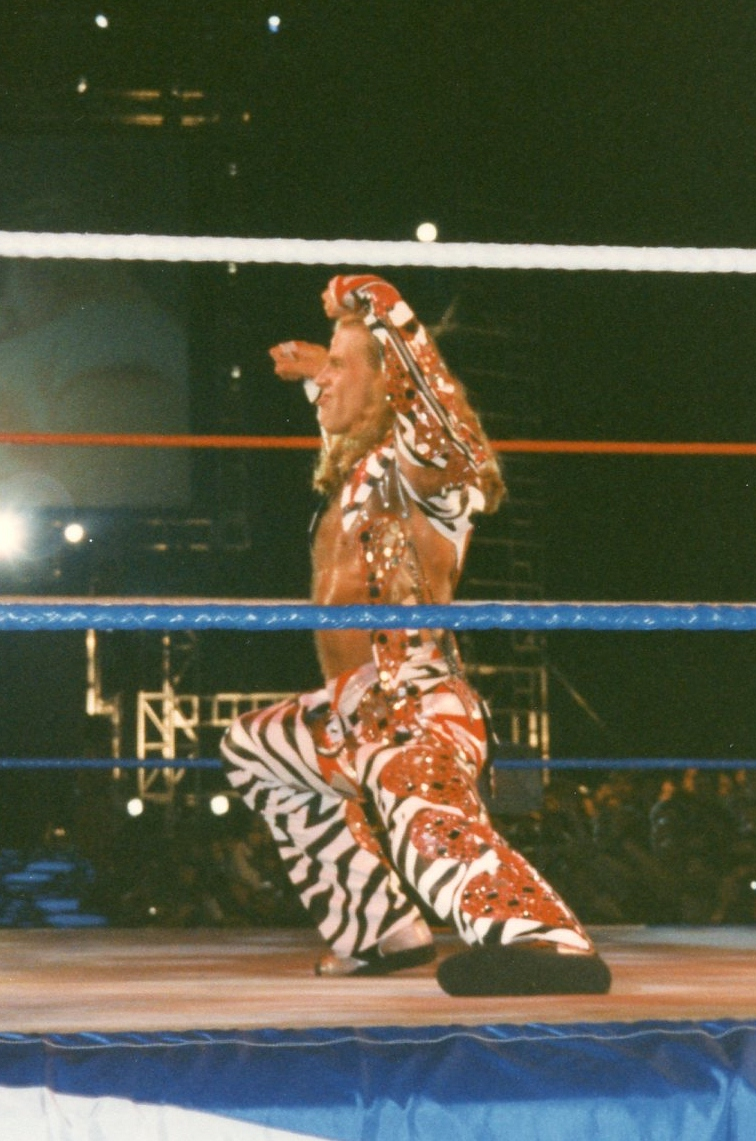
Shawn Michaels in September 1997

Another storyline from 1996 to 1997 was the personal feud between Bret Hart and Shawn Michaels, who had legitimate issues with one another outside of wrestling. The conflict behind the scenes spilled into their on-screen storyline, where both men made deeply personal remarks in interviews and promo segments that were often rooted in these issues. One of the best known incidents was the so-called "Sunny Days" comment on the May 21, 1997 episode of Raw where Michaels seemingly unscripted directed at Hart that he was having a real-life affair with "Sunny" Tammy Sytch.

On November 1, 1997, then-WWF Champion Hart officially signed a contract to work for WCW beginning that December. Notably, Hart was also unhappy with the new "crude" direction that the WWF was taking in its programming. Vince McMahon sought to prevent Hart from leaving the WWF as its champion, allegedly not wanting Hart to potentially appear on WCW television with the WWF Championship, and proposed having Hart lose to Michaels at their scheduled match at Survivor Series on November 9. Hart refused due to his personal issues with Michaels becoming too great, with Bret using his "creative control" clause included in his WWF contract as leverage. Both parties seemingly came to an agreement in which the match would have a disqualification finish – which would not result in a title change – therefore, Hart would retain the championship and either lose or forfeit the title at a later date. However, McMahon, Michaels, and other WWF employees covertly went on to change the outcome of the match without Hart's knowledge.

During the pay-per-view broadcast at Survivor Series, a video package aired immediately before the Hart vs. Michaels match, debuting the "Attitude" promo that included the first instance of the WWF "scratch" logo. This "edgy" design was noticeably different from the existing cartoony yellow and blue themed WWF logo. During the match, Michaels placed Hart in the Sharpshooter, Hart's signature finishing maneuver. McMahon – who was at ringside, a rarity at the time, as he was primarily working as an on-screen commentator – quickly ordered referee Earl Hebner to call for the bell and award Michaels the WWF Championship by submission, despite Hart not submitting. Hart, realizing that he had been the victim of a so-called "screwjob", spit on McMahon, destroyed television equipment, and traced the letters "WCW" in the air with his finger while fans in the arena threw garbage into the ring area and expressed their support for Hart. The incident would go on to be dubbed the Montreal Screwjob. One week later, on Raw, McMahon gave an interview with Jim Ross in which McMahon explained his actions and infamously claimed that "Bret Hart screwed Bret Hart." The WWF successfully went on to parlay fan resentment towards McMahon – whose position as owner of the WWF was rarely acknowledged on-screen prior to the Montreal Screwjob – into creating the "Mr. McMahon" character, a villainous, overbearing boss. McMahon's new heel character would become a major part of the WWF's transition to reality-based storylines, particularly his rivalry with Stone Cold Steve Austin.

The Montreal Screwjob is considered by some as the beginning of the Attitude Era. The scratch logo was gradually rolled out (first appearing on-air on the December 15, 1997 episode of Raw) and had fully replaced the older block WWF logo (such as in the WWF published magazines) by May 1998.

==== Vince McMahon's promo ====
On the December 15, 1997 edition of Raw, McMahon expressed the change into the new era as an evolution towards more contemporary tones in a fourth wall breaking segment denoted as "The Cure For The Common Show". He harkened back to the phrase "sports entertainment", to describe the pairing of athleticism now delving deeper beyond sports mediums in favor of broader spectrums like popular television programs of the time. McMahon discussed the idea of blurring the lines more for fans between the typical hero and villain (or babyface and heel) dynamic which would ring true for popular anti-hero Steve Austin. He referred to the "era of the superhero urging you to say your prayers and eat your vitamins" as passé; as of that time former WWF Champion Hulk Hogan had also transitioned from larger than life superhero into the leader of the villainous faction The New World Order on WCW television. It verbally represented a transition further from the Hulkamania era of the 1980s as well as the "New Generation" period of the early-to-mid-1990s.

McMahon laid out a campaign to continue adapting creatively with the times as a means of furthering the WWF's longevity. He advised parental discretion for parents of younger viewers among an increased viewer base who would now be watching RAW and War Zone, but that no such discretion would be necessary for the morning shows Saturday LiveWire and Sunday Superstars. Near the end of the promo, McMahon added that the new creative direction has "resulted in a huge increase in television viewership", thus implying that the "Attitude" era had already been underway to positive television ratings effect.

==== USA Network ownership change ====
In October 1997, USA Network owners at Seagram agreed to sell the network to media mogul Barry Diller. Diller's purchase of the USA Network was finalized in February 1998, and longtime USA Network managing head Kay Koplovitz would be ousted from the network she founded two months later. Shaun Assael and Mike Mooneyham's book Sex, Lies, and Headlocks: The Real Story of Vince McMahon and World Wrestling Entertainment stated that "the terrain shifted completely under everyone's feet" following Diller's purchase of the USA Network, which began in October 1997, and that Koplovitz was in fact planning to remove WWF programming from the USA Network prior to the purchase.

Following the purchase, the WWF began to dominate cable television ratings with Raw episodes which were not only breaking away from traditional censorship, but that were also showing fans at ringside screaming obscenities, wearing risqué t-shirts, and holding signs that often sported controversial phrases. The USA Network was even reported as showing less remorse than WWF owner Vince McMahon did over a controversial incident on the September 14, 1998 episode of Raw where the wrestler Jacqueline had one of her breasts exposed during an evening gown match, which network spokesman David Schwartz described as "not worse than anything you see on broadcast television at that time of night, such as NYPD Blue." USA Network executive Bonnie Hammer, a protege of Diller who was also one of the few USA Network executives to speak out against the plan to cancel Raw, worked extensively with head writer Vince Russo in reinventing the World Wrestling Federation. In 2022, Russo stated that the USA Network "directly oversaw the WWE product" during he and his creative partner Ed Ferrera's time with the WWF, with Ferrera actually serving as a USA Network consultant and working with Hammer.

== Notable stars ==
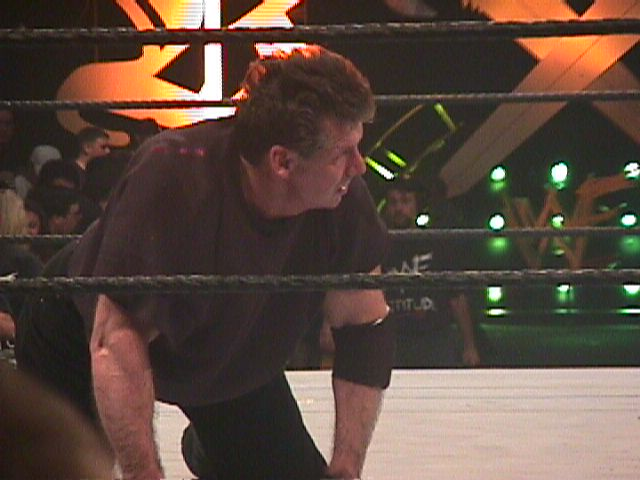
Vince McMahon in 2000. His Mr. McMahon persona was inspired by audience response to the Montreal Screwjob, laying the groundwork for the Attitude Era.

Stone Cold Steve Austin had been a leading figure into the start of the Attitude Era and is considered to be the most prominent superstar throughout the era. The era featured a generation of new wrestlers that would become prominent WWF stars during this time, largely replacing the old guard of the preceding New Generation Era (such as Shawn Michaels, Bret Hart, Diesel, Yokozuna, Razor Ramon, Lex Luger and Doink the Clown), although The Undertaker was a notable exception who would also be prominent in the Attitude Era.

In addition, Vince McMahon himself, the chairman of the WWF, would be a major prominent figure in the Attitude Era as he began competing and feuding for the first time since his first on-screen WWF appearance in 1969. McMahon made his in-ring debut on the April 13, 1998 episode of Raw Is War against Stone Cold.

=== Stone Cold Steve Austin ===
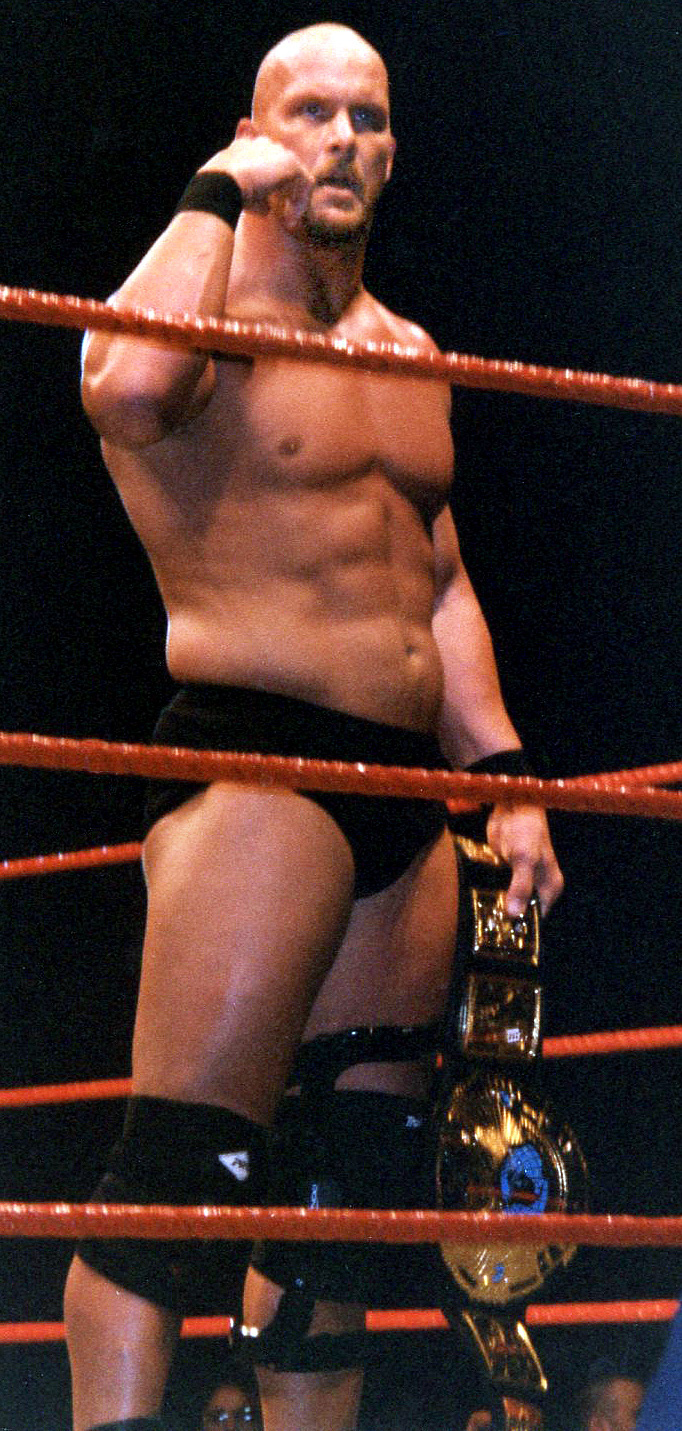
Stone Cold as the WWF Champion in 1999. Austin was widely considered by critics, fans, and the WWF itself to be the face of the Attitude Era.

After Stone Cold Steve Austin won the 1998 Royal Rumble, former heavyweight boxing champion Mike Tyson, who was in attendance at the pay-per-view, made a guest appearance on Raw the following night. Tyson, who at the time was still suspended from boxing, was to be introduced as the "Special Guest Enforcer" referee for the championship match at WrestleMania XIV, but Vince McMahon's presentation of Tyson was abruptly interrupted by Austin, who flipped off Tyson, leading to a brief scuffle. In an interview with Austin, head writer Vince Russo described this moment as the start of the Attitude Era. Over the following weeks, Tyson aligned himself with Michaels, Austin's opponent at WrestleMania, and D-Generation X. At WrestleMania, in the closing moments of the match, Tyson counted Austin's victorious pinfall on Michaels. Tyson was paid $4 million for his role.

Following his crowning as champion, a long-term storyline pitting Austin and McMahon as rivals began, and it proved pivotal in increasing the WWF's revenues from merchandise sales, arena events, and PPV sales, as well as television ratings. Week by week, Austin would regularly have to overcome the odds stacked against him by Mr. McMahon. Austin and McMahon were featured in numerous segments which led to a scheduled match between the duo on April 13, 1998, episode of Raw. Austin and McMahon were going to battle out their differences in an actual match, but the match was declared a no-contest when Mick Foley (Reprising his character Dude Love) interrupted. On that night, Raw defeated Nitro in the television ratings for the first time since June 10, 1996. Austin again wrestled McMahon on February 14, 1999, at St. Valentine's Day Massacre in a steel cage match, which he won when the debuting Big Show accidentally threw him through the cage wall, resulting in Austin earning a WWF title shot at WrestleMania XV, where he defeated The Rock, whom he also defeated in a rematch the following month at Backlash.

Throughout the Austin-McMahon rivalry, McMahon founded two heel factions: The Corporation and The Corporate Ministry. The feud between the two also involved some of the most iconic moments of Austin getting revenge on McMahon, including driving a Zamboni to the ring to attack McMahon; disguising himself as a hospital nurse to ambush McMahon; stealing a cement mixer and filling McMahon's Chevrolet Corvette with cement; and driving to the ring in a beer truck and using a fire hose to spray Vince, Shane McMahon, and The Rock with beer.

At Fully Loaded in 1999, Vince McMahon added a special stipulation to the scheduled first blood match between The Undertaker and Austin for the WWF Championship. The stipulation was that if Austin won, McMahon would kayfabe step away from the WWF, but if Austin lost, he would never receive a shot at the WWF Championship again. Austin won the match, thus leading to Vince temporarily being banned from the WWF. At Survivor Series, Austin was run down by a car driven by a mystery assailant in the parking lot. This was due to Austin needing to take time away from wrestling because of underlying spinal and neck issues caused by his initial injury at SummerSlam in 1997. Austin then underwent spinal fusion surgery by Dr. Lloyd Youngblood. Austin would not be seen on WWF television (aside from a one-off appearance at Backlash 2000) for nine months.

Upon Austin's return at Unforgiven 2000, he confronted and questioned several superstars, hoping to find his assailant. Rikishi would ultimately admit responsibility for the attack on Austin, claiming the assault was done as a favor per the request of Austin's prior rival, The Rock. Austin faced off against Rikishi at No Mercy, the match ending in a no contest. Austin would go on to win the 2001 Royal Rumble match and face The Rock for the WWF Championship in the main event of WrestleMania X-Seven. At WrestleMania, Austin officially turned heel after aligning with his former rival Vince McMahon and defeated The Rock to regain the WWF Championship. During the Invasion storyline, Austin entered a rivalry with Kurt Angle, losing the WWF Championship to Angle at Unforgiven.

=== The Rock ===
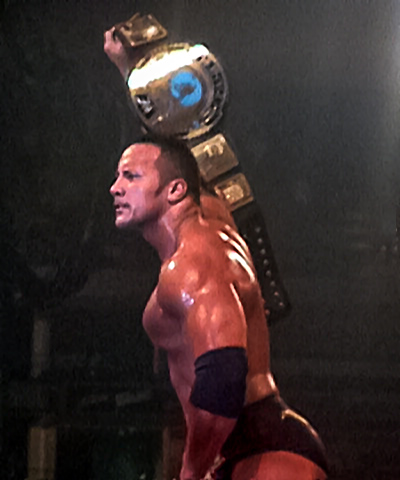
The Rock as the WWF Champion in 2000. Also considered by some to be the face of the Attitude Era.

Dwayne Johnson, a third-generation wrestler, made his debut at the 1996 Survivor Series as "Rocky Maivia", naming himself after his grandfather Peter Maivia and his father Rocky Johnson. Despite being a babyface with an impressive winning streak and an Intercontinental Championship reign, he was frequently met with negative reception from live audiences, such as loud boos, "Rocky sucks!" chants, and even crowd signs that read "Die Rocky Die". Maivia officially turned heel when he joined the Nation of Domination in late 1997 and renamed himself "The Rock". As a member of the Nation of Domination, The Rock won the Intercontinental title for a second time. The Rock eventually overthrew Faarooq to become the leader of the Nation. After the Nation disbanded in late 1998, The Rock began referring to himself as the "People's Champion" and began to receive the support of the audience, which led Vince McMahon and the Corporation to target him. Survivor Series 1998 marked the first PPV headlined by The Rock. During the final match of a tournament against Mankind to crown a new WWF Champion, a double turn occurred with the help of McMahon, similar to the previous year's Survivor Series, revealing that Rock was working with The Corporation all along, leading to The Rock's victory. The Rock officially joined McMahon as the crown jewel of The Corporation, abandoning his previous moniker as "The People's Champion" and declaring himself "The Corporate Champion".

The Rock had a lengthy feud with Mankind, who won the title on an episode of Raw in January 1999. The reign was short-lived. However, The Rock received his rematch at the 1999 Royal Rumble in an I Quit Match. The Rock won the I Quit Match in a controversial fashion and became the WWF Champion again. A rematch, known as "Half-Time Heat", took place during halftime of that year's Super Bowl, which saw Mankind win the match and the title. The Rock would receive another rematch at St. Valentine's Day Massacre, in a last-man-standing match for the chance to headline WrestleMania XV as the WWF Champion. The bout ended in a draw after both men were unable to stand before the ten count. Despite Mankind being the WWF Champion, he gave The Rock one more shot at the title in a ladder match on Raw. This would end up being their final match, which ended again in controversy as the recent acquisition to The Corporation, "The Big Show" Paul Wight interfered and choke-slammed Mankind off the ladder, allowing The Rock to win the WWF championship for the third time, and headline WrestleMania XV. At WrestleMania, The Rock defended the title in a no-disqualification match against Stone Cold Steve Austin. Before the match, WWF Commissioner Shawn Michaels declared The Corporation were to be barred from ringside. Despite this, Vince McMahon interfered anyway attacking Austin and the referee. Giving The Rock an advantage. Mankind would even the odds, assisting Austin by filling in as the final referee, which allowed Austin to defeat The Rock and win the championship. The following month, The Rock would get his revenge by stealing Stone Cold Steve Austin's prized Smoking Skull Belt, which Austin used the previous year as his own personal title. This was the basis for their match at Backlash: In Your House. A rematch of WrestleMania XV, with Shane McMahon as special guest referee. At Backlash, Austin successfully defended the WWF championship, and won back the Smoking Skull Belt.

After Backlash, The Rock was fired from the Corporation by Shane McMahon after both blamed the other for the defeat. The Rock, who was now an enemy of The Corporation once again declared himself the People's Champion and went on a number of small feuds during the latter part of 1999. During this time, The Rock's popularity began to flourish again, and he aligned with his former rival Mankind to create the tag team, The Rock 'n' Sock Connection. In November 1999, The Rock surpassed Stone Cold Steve Austin as the WWF's top babyface star. The team won the WWF Tag Team Championship on an episode of Raw in 1999. After the Rock 'n' Sock connection broke up, The Rock went back into the main event picture of the WWF, battling the likes of Triple H and his stable, the McMahon-Helmsley Regime. During the McMahon-Helmsley storyline in May, The Rock departed brief hiatus from the WWF to film The Mummy Returns as his character, the Scorpion King before he returned to the WWF to face Triple H in a 60-minute Iron man match for the WWF Championship at Judgment Day in May 2000. Late in the Attitude Era, The Rock faced Stone Cold Steve Austin again at WrestleMania X-Seven in the main event match for the WWF Championship. Austin once again defeated The Rock to regain the title and joined forces with his nemesis Mr. McMahon. Later in 2001, upon his return to the company following a brief hiatus, The Rock would defeat Booker T at SummerSlam to win the WCW Championship, which was now part of the WWF following WWF's purchase of WCW earlier that March. Later that year at Survivor Series, The Rock led Team WWF to victory over Team Alliance as part of the Invasion storyline, by being the sole survivor after last eliminating his rival Austin and celebrated the win with Vince McMahon.

=== Mick Foley ===
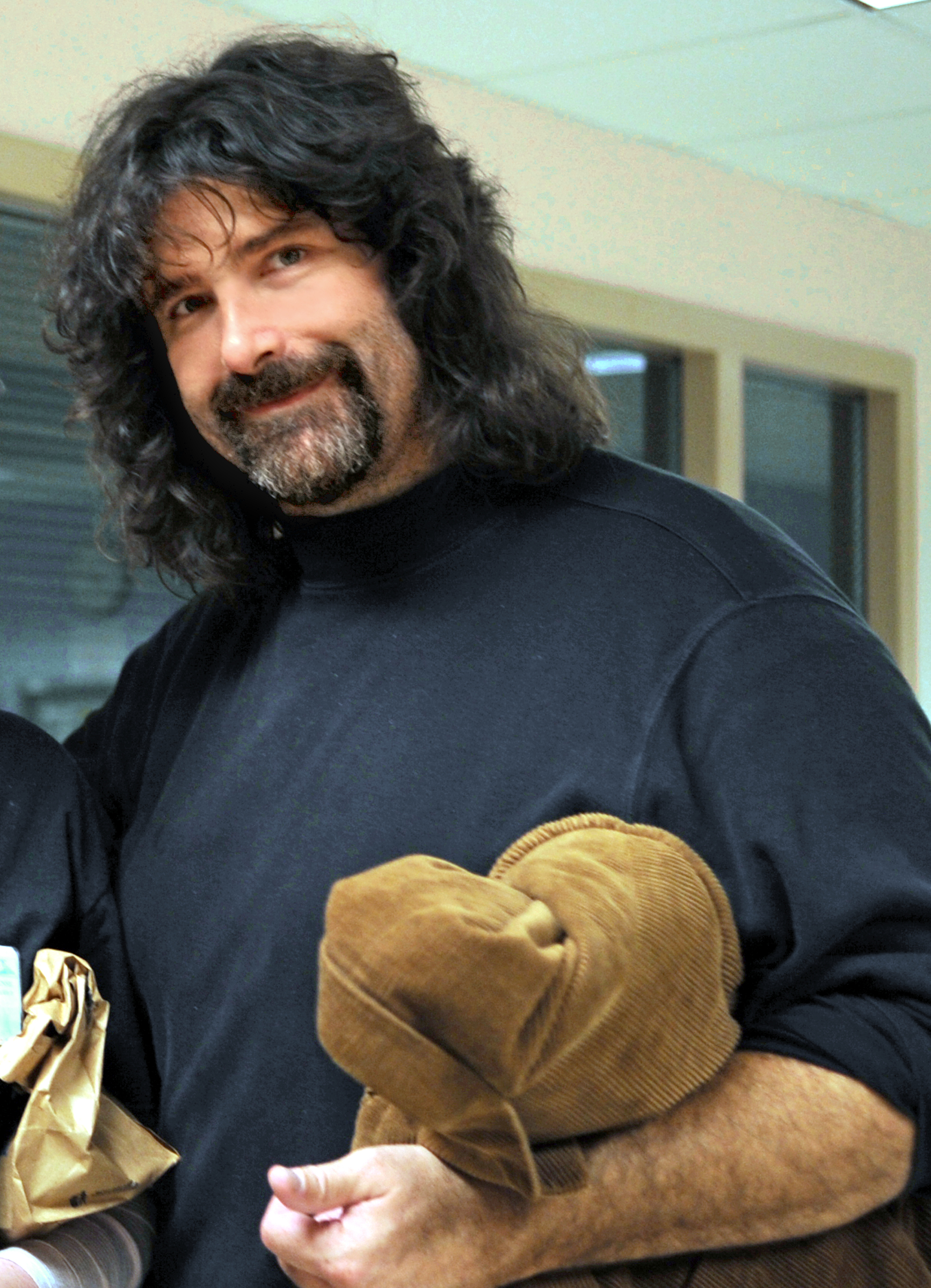
Mick Foley

Mick Foley played three different personas during this era: Mankind, Dude Love, and Cactus Jack. While Mankind was his main WWF persona, and Cactus Jack was previously used in his days in WCW, ECW, Japan, and various independent promotions, Dude Love was inspired by a character Foley created when he and his high school friends participated in backyard wrestling in Long Island, New York. Foley debuted both Dude Love and Cactus Jack in the WWF in mid-1997, while Mankind debuted at Foley's first-ever WWF event on April 1, 1996, during the Raw after WrestleMania XII. Foley's creative versatility allowed him to create distinct characteristics for each character. The 1998 Hell in a Cell match between Mankind and The Undertaker remains one of the most iconic and memorable Hell in a Cell matches to ever take place, with its level of extreme violence and dangerous spots, such as Mankind getting legitimately knocked unconscious and suffering multiple injuries. Though Mankind lost the match, he has been well praised for the brutality he endured during the match.

On the January 4, 1999 edition of Raw, Foley won his first WWF Championship, defeating The Rock with the help of Steve Austin. This match is regarded as a major turning point of the Monday Night War, shifting the ratings permanently in the WWF's favor. The duo fought in an infamous "I quit" match at the 1999 Royal Rumble event. The match was notable for its brutality, in the ending The Rock chased a bloodied Mankind out of the ring and up the walkway while having Mankind handcuffed, hitting him repeatedly with a chair (a total 13 times over the match) until he fell unconscious on the concrete. Finally, Mankind was heard shouting "I quit!" three times in a row; the audio was actually a recording from a promo Mankind made on Heat in the match build up, so Mankind never actually quit, but the Rock was still declared the winner of the match.

Backstage In 2000, Foley reprised his Cactus Jack persona and was involved in a major rivalry with Triple H over the WWF Championship. The duo had a critically acclaimed street fight match at the 2000 Royal Rumble which Triple H won, with the level of brutality displayed by the duo being praised. At No Way Out, Foley lost to Triple H in a Hell in a Cell match, and as per the stipulation, Foley was forced to retire from full-time competition. Despite this Foley competed in the Fatal Four-Way Elimination match main event of WrestleMania 2000 against the Rock, The Big Show and Triple H, which was won by Triple H. Foley would then serve as storyline WWF Commissioner under his real name beginning in the summer of 2000. He lost the position that December after being kayfabe fired onscreen by Mr. McMahon during which he also received a brutal beat down.

=== Triple H ===
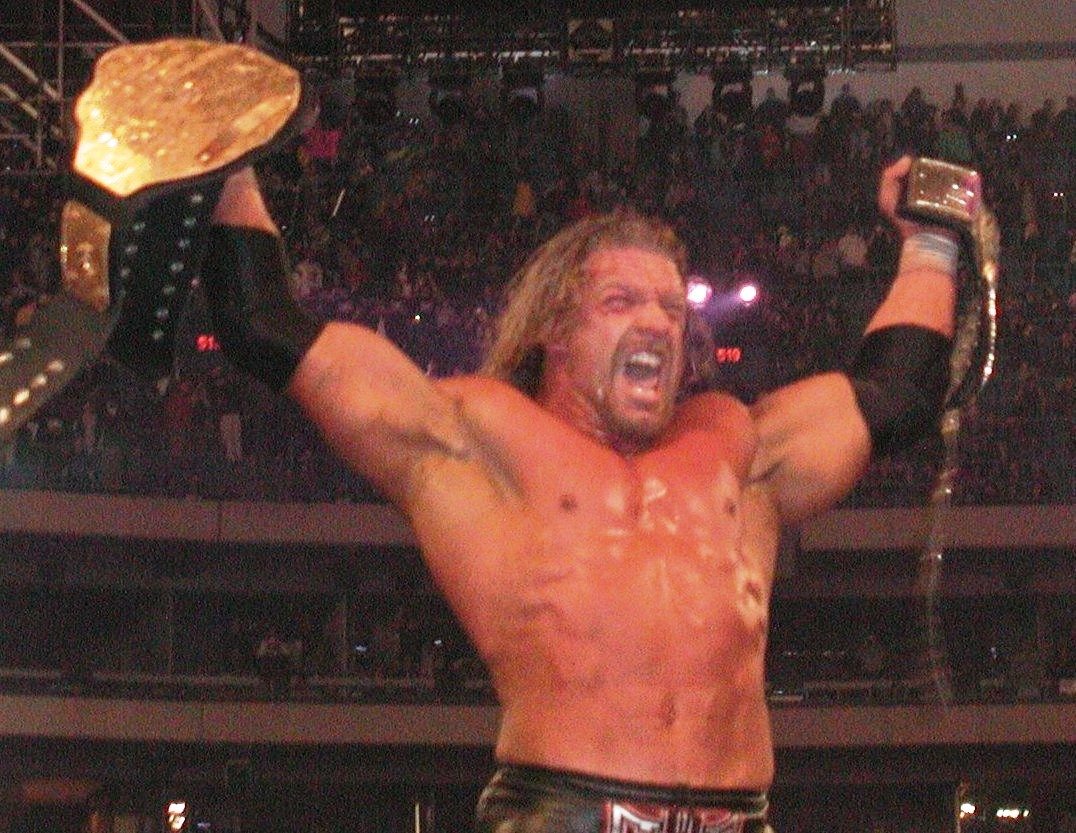
Triple H as the Undisputed WWF Champion at WrestleMania X8

At the start of the Attitude Era, following Shawn Michaels' severe back injury and subsequent retirement from wrestling in 1998, Triple H assumed leadership of D-Generation X. At SummerSlam, Triple H defeated The Rock in a ladder match with the help of fellow D-X member Chyna to win the Intercontinental Championship. At WrestleMania XV, Triple H lost to Kane after Chyna interfered on his behalf and seemingly rejoined D-X. Later on in the night, however, Triple H would betray his long-time friend and fellow D-X member X-Pac by helping Shane McMahon retain the European Championship and joined The Corporation, turning heel in the process. In April, he started moving away from his D-X look, taping his fists for matches, sporting new traditional wrestling trunks, and adopting a shorter hairstyle. His gimmick changed as he fought to earn a WWF Championship opportunity, and Triple H began referring to himself in interviews as "The Game". After failed attempts at winning the championship, Triple H, along with Mankind, challenged then-WWF Champion Stone Cold Steve Austin to a triple threat match at SummerSlam, which featured Jesse "The Body" Ventura as the special guest referee. Mankind won the match and the title by pinning Austin. The following night on Raw, Triple H defeated Mankind to win his first WWF Championship. However, he would lose the WWF Championship to Mr. McMahon on the September 16, 1999, episode of SmackDown! before regaining it at Unforgiven in a Six-Pack Challenge that included British Bulldog, Big Show, Kane, The Rock, and Mankind. He defeated Stone Cold Steve Austin at No Mercy before dropping the title to Big Show at Survivor Series. Triple H then continued his feud with Mr. McMahon by marrying his daughter Stephanie McMahon and defeating McMahon at Armageddon, which saw Stephanie betray Vince. As a result of the feud, an angle with Triple H and Stephanie began, which carried the WWF throughout the next seventeen months; together, they were known as The McMahon-Helmsley Regime.

Triple H participated in the Fatal Four-Way Elimination match main event of WrestleMania 2000 with Stephanie at his corner for the WWF Championship, becoming the first heel to win the main event of WrestleMania. He would continue to feud with The Rock in the following months, which included a 60-minute Iron Man match between the duo at Judgment Day, a match Triple H won. However, Triple H would lose the title to The Rock in a Six-Man Tag Team Elimination Match at that year's King of the Ring. Triple H would then be involved in a love triangle with Kurt Angle and Stephanie before revealing himself to be the man who convinced Rikishi to run over Stone Cold Steve Austin the year prior. At the 2001 Royal Rumble, Triple H lost to Kurt Angle in a WWF Championship match. Triple H would, unfortunately, suffer a severe quadriceps injury during an episode of Raw in May 2001, which would lead him to be out of action for the rest of the year.

=== Chyna ===
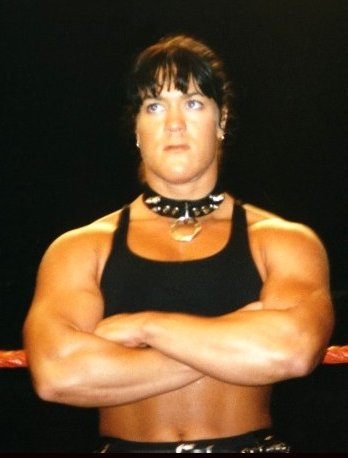
"The 9th Wonder of the World", Chyna in 1997

Chyna made her WWF debut on February 16, 1997, at In Your House 13: Final Four; her character emerged as a plant from a ringside seat, choking Marlena while Goldust was in the ring with Triple H. Her original role in the promotion was as the stoic enforcer/bodyguard for Triple H and later D-Generation X, which was founded by both Triple H and Shawn Michaels. She often helped them cheat to win by physically interfering in matches by executing her trademark low blow to the groin. She was given the ring name "Chyna", an intentionally ironic moniker; fine china is delicate and fragile, a sharp contrast to her character. Backstage, however, the male wrestlers initially hesitated to let a woman be seen overpowering them on television. Despite this, she would become a prominent member of D-Generation X, and besides competing in the women's division, she would regularly compete against male wrestlers in intergender matches.

Chyna being considerably stronger than any other women in the roster participated in several Intergender wrestling matches against mid-card male wrestlers and won the Intercontinental champion twice. She defeated Jeff Jarrett at No Mercy in 1999 to win her first Intercontinental Championship title. Not long after losing the Intercontinental Championship title during her first reign, Chyna became the on-screen girlfriend of the recently debuted Eddie Guerrero. Originally seen as villains, they became fan favorites during the summer of 2000, with Guerrero dubbing her his "Mamacita". They faced Val Venis and Trish Stratus in an intergender tag team match at SummerSlam with the Intercontinental Championship on the line. Chyna won the match, but her second reign ended when she lost the belt two weeks later to Guerrero in a Triple Threat match with Kurt Angle. The two officially split in November 2000 after Chyna, in storyline, was shown footage of Eddie cavorting in the shower with two other women. Chyna left the WWF on November 30, 2001, several months after she had been taken off of television.

=== The Brothers of Destruction (The Undertaker and Kane) ===
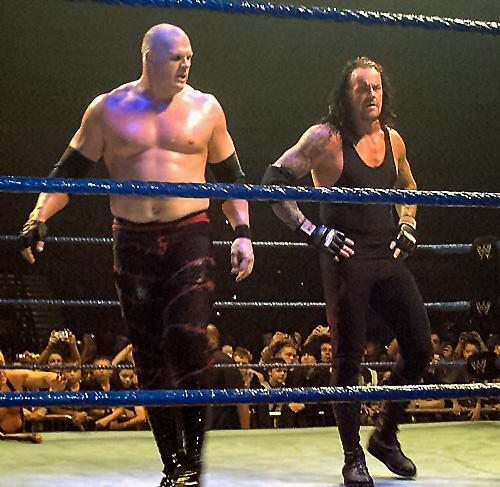
The Undertaker and Kane, known together as "The Brothers of Destruction"

At SummerSlam in 1996, The Undertaker became embroiled in a feud with his former manager Paul Bearer. During the course of their conflict, Bearer threatened The Undertaker with the threat of revealing his "secret", calling him a "murderer", and accusing him of killing his parents and brother. In the weeks that followed on Raw, Bearer revealed that Kane was actually still alive and that Bearer had an affair with The Undertaker's mother, which produced Kane, meaning Bearer was Kane's biological father. Kane officially debuted at Badd Blood: In Your House, interfering in the inaugural Hell in a Cell match between The Undertaker and Shawn Michaels. Following a series of taunts from Bearer and Kane, who cost him the WWF Championship at the Royal Rumble, The Undertaker, who had previously stated that he would never fight his own brother, agreed to face Kane at WrestleMania XIV. The Undertaker won the match at WrestleMania and proceeded to win the first ever Inferno Match the following month at Unforgiven.

Kane then teamed with The Undertaker's rival Mankind, and they won the WWF Tag Team Championship on two occasions. In the interim, Kane would win the WWF Championship from Stone Cold Steve Austin during a First Blood main event match at King of the Ring 1998, which was preceded by a Hell in a Cell match between Mankind and The Undertaker that The Undertaker had won, but Kane lost the title to Austin the following night on Raw. A few weeks later, thanks to the influence of The Undertaker, Kane turned on Mankind. Following the conclusion of this storyline, The Undertaker and Kane united to form a tag team that became known as The Brothers of Destruction. In late 1998, The Undertaker turned on Kane and realigned himself with Paul Bearer, both wrestlers executing a double turn in the process. Now a heel and proclaiming himself as the "Ministry of Darkness", The Undertaker began taking a more macabre and darker persona, claiming that a "plague of evil" was coming to the WWF. During the weeks that followed, he reignited his feud with Stone Cold Steve Austin, whom he blamed for costing him the WWF title. At Rock Bottom: In Your House, Austin defeated The Undertaker in a Buried Alive match with the help of Kane, writing him off of WWF television for a month. As a result, The Corporation had Kane committed to an insane asylum. Kane was then forced to join The Corporation in order to stay out of the insane asylum. He was later betrayed by them and thrown out of the faction. A 12-minute match between The Undertaker and Stone Cold Steve Austin drew a 9.5 rating on June 28, 1999. It stands as one of the highest-rated segment in Raw history. The match was fought for the WWF Championship, and was won by Austin.

The Undertaker and Kane briefly reformed The Brothers of Destruction in the summer of 2000; at this time, The Undertaker had recently taken on the "American Badass" biker persona instead of the satanic character he had portrayed previously. Now faces, the two challenged then-WWF Tag Team Champions Edge and Christian for the titles on an episode of Raw, but due to interference from Kurt Angle, they were disqualified, meaning they didn't win the titles. On the August 14 episode of Raw, The Undertaker faced Chris Benoit in a match where Kane turned heel on The Undertaker by chokeslamming him through the ring, and the two feuded with each other once again. This culminated in a match at SummerSlam, which resulted in a no contest when The Undertaker unmasked Kane, causing him to flee the ring. On the April 19, 2001, episode of SmackDown! The Undertaker and Kane defeated Edge and Christian in a no disqualification tag team match to win the WWF Tag Team Championship.

=== Kurt Angle ===
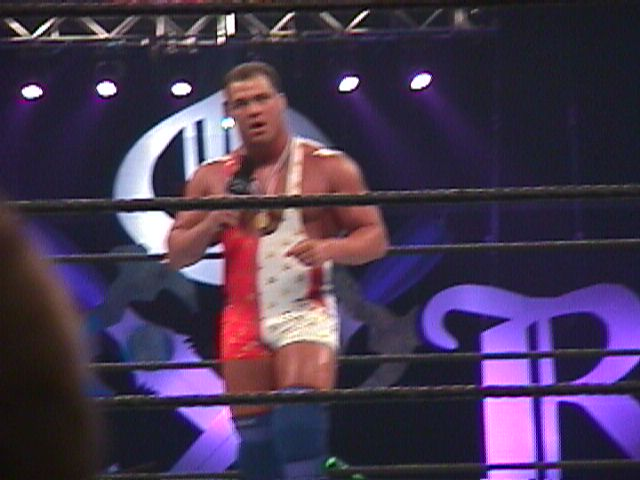
Kurt Angle at the King of the Ring 2000

Kurt Angle, the 1996 Olympic Gold Medalist, debuted at the 1999 Survivor Series as a heel who opposed the society and culture of the Attitude Era. Citing his "three I's"; Intensity, Integrity, and Intelligence, Angle would hypocritically chastise crowds each week to the crowd's disapproval. In his initial push, he remained undefeated for several weeks, eventually losing to the debuting Tazz by passing out at the 2000 Royal Rumble.

Angle would go on to win the European and Intercontinental championships, holding both titles simultaneously and dubbing himself the "Eurocontinental" champion. Angle lost both the Intercontinental and European championships in a two-fall triple threat match to Chris Benoit and Chris Jericho, respectively, without losing a single fall. Angle would go on to win the 2000 King of the Ring tournament and be crowned the 2000 King of the Ring. Angle would then be involved in a love triangle with Triple H and Stephanie McMahon during the summer of 2000, stemming from interactions between Angle and McMahon beginning in December 1999. This would lead to Angle's first PPV main event, where he would face The Rock and Triple H for the WWF Championship at SummerSlam. Following the love triangle, Kurt Angle defeated The Rock to win his first WWF Championship at No Mercy. Kurt Angle successfully defended the WWF Championship in the first and only 6-man Hell in a Cell match at Armageddon that included The Rock, Stone Cold, Triple H, The Undertaker, and Rikishi. In February 2001, Angle would lose the WWF Championship back to The Rock at No Way Out. Later that year at the 2001 King of the Ring event Kurt Angle defeated Shane McMahon in a highly acclaimed Street Fight match notable for its extreme brutality, which included spots like Angle throwing McMahon through glass walls and both men suffering legitimate injuries. Angle has been cited having the greatest rookie year of not only the Attitude Era but in WWE history, quickly becoming a main star. At Unforgiven in 2001, Kurt Angle defeated Stone Cold Steve Austin to win his second WWF Championship.

== Stables ==
=== D-Generation X ===
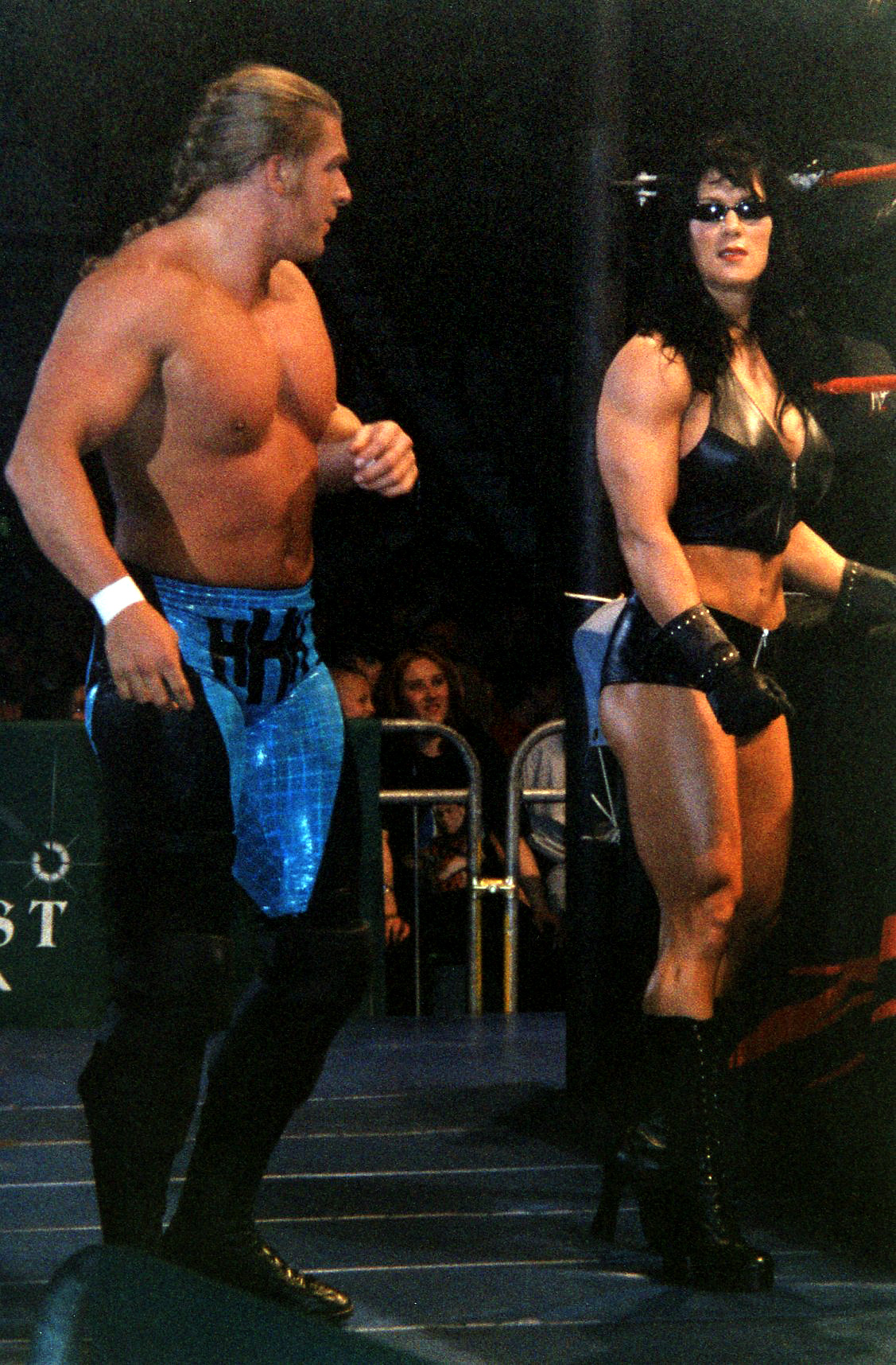
Chyna (right) acted as an enforcer for Triple H (left) and Michaels in 1997, then remained allied with the larger incarnation of the stable until 1999.

D-Generation X officially formed on August 11, 1997, edition of Raw after Hunter Hearst Helmsley, Chyna, and Rick Rude helped Shawn Michaels win his main event match against Mankind. The night after WrestleMania XIV, Shawn Michaels began a four-year hiatus from in-ring wrestling to recuperate from a severe back injury. Triple H cut a promo claiming that he was taking over D-Generation X and had ejected the absent Michaels for "dropping the ball" after losing the WWF Championship the previous night. Triple H would then recruit the New Age Outlaws ("Road Dogg" Jesse James and "Bad Ass" Billy Gunn) and X-Pac. On April 28, 1998, WCW's Nitro event was held at the Norfolk Scope in Norfolk, Virginia, while Raw was held nearby at the Hampton Coliseum in Hampton, Virginia. With the ongoing war between WWF and WCW, DX was sent to initiate an immediate "invasion" of Nitro, driving in an army Jeep and challenging WCW head Eric Bischoff. Soon after, DX appeared at CNN Center (as well as WCW's stand-alone Atlanta offices) to call out WCW owner Ted Turner. The stable's popularity continued to rapidly grow, and they were eventually pushed as antihero fan favorites, much like Stone Cold Steve Austin and The Rock. On the November 6, 2000, episode of Raw, Chyna, Road Dogg, Billy Gunn, and Triple H, as part of D-Generation X, took on The Radicalz (Chris Benoit, Eddie Guerrero, Dean Malenko, and Perry Saturn) in an eight-person tag team match, which DX won. This would be their final match while united in the Era, after which Triple H and Chyna began receiving their own singles pushes while the others fell into the mid and lower cards.

=== The Corporation ===
In 1998, storylines involving Mr. McMahon struggling to maintain order within the WWF led to the creation of a new faction, the Corporation. The Corporation was officially formed on November 16, 1998, when Shane and Vince McMahon, along with Big Boss Man, Sgt. Slaughter, Pat Patterson, Gerald Brisco, and The Rock joined forces. The faction would feud heavily with Stone Cold, D-Generation X, and later the Ministry of Darkness, the latter of which would lead to an eventual merge. The merger would lead to the creation of the Corporate Ministry, a mega-faction led by Shane McMahon and The Undertaker, as well as suffering defections with the creation of the short-lived Union.

=== Ministry of Darkness ===
Upon his return, The Undertaker introduced his Ministry of Darkness, a satanic-themed stable which would consist of The Acolytes (Faarooq and Bradshaw), Mideon, Viscera and The Brood (Edge, Christian, and Gangrel). The storyline continued over the weeks that followed, as The Undertaker announced his intentions of taking over the WWF and claimed he was working for a "higher power". He began a feud with Vince McMahon and his daughter Stephanie, with the Ministry burning The Undertaker's symbol in the McMahon family yard. At Backlash: In Your House, The Undertaker kidnapped Stephanie and attempted to marry her to The Undertaker the next night on Raw by holding a "Black Wedding". The ceremony was successfully ruined by Stone Cold Steve Austin after two attempts by former Corporation members Big Show, and Ken Shamrock failed. The Ministry would later merge with the Corporation, forming the Corporate Ministry, which would be involved with most major storylines until July, when they would disband.

== Women's division ==
=== Original Divas ===
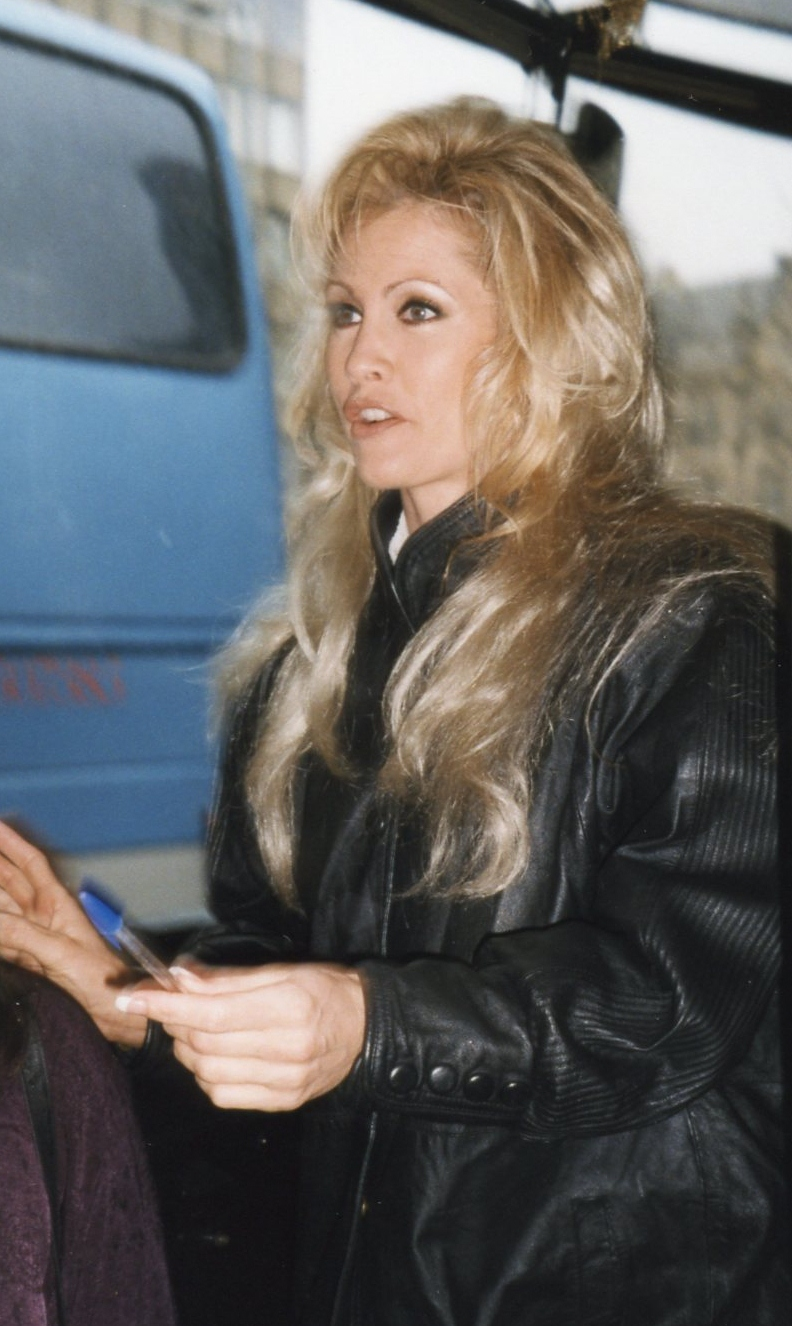
Sable during a WWF tour in England in April 1998. She was the first WWF female wrestler to refer to herself as a Diva.

In August 1995, WWF debuted Tammy Lynn Sytch as "Sunny". According to the Toronto Sun, she was able to use "sex appeal, looks and serious wrestling moves" to become famous beyond wrestling, and was named by AOL as the "most downloaded woman of the year" in 1996. Rena Mero made her WWF debut at WrestleMania XII in March 1996; using the name "Sable", she escorted Hunter Hearst Helmsley to the ring when he faced Ultimate Warrior, and her first major angle involved her then real-life husband "Wildman" Marc Mero. The WWF used both Sunny and Sable in selling sex during 1996, occurring before the Attitude Era and influencing what would later come. Sable quickly eclipsed both her husband and Sunny in popularity, first leading to her becoming an in-ring performer, and later to the reinstatement of the WWF Women's Championship.

Sable would become the first WWF female to refer to herself as a "Diva"; the term would be coined and shortly thereafter became the official title for WWF's female performers. The use of Sable as an on-screen character was increasingly sexual, including competing in the first "bikini contest" against Jacqueline at Fully Loaded: In Your House. Her on-screen popularity resulted in her breaking through into mainstream pop culture, becoming the first wrestler to appear on the cover of Playboy. Sable was considered the "blonde bombshell", the usage of Sable's appealing appearance to draw more male viewers reignited the interest in the women's division and wrestling journalist Dave Meltzer has described her as a "huge ratings draw". Sable later said that it was written into her contract that she was not allowed to take bumps. Even rival WCW's management was worried about Sable's attractiveness being a huge drawing factor for male viewers during that time.

The Sable character would eventually be transitioned into a heel, and soon after the relationship between the WWF and Mero would break down, with Mero filing a $110 million lawsuit, saying that the WWF had become increasingly "obscene, titillating, vulgar and unsafe", and alleged that she was asked to perform in lesbian storylines, as well as being requested to strip on live television. Sable's rise in popularity was repeated by Chyna, who would be featured in a more prominent role; in addition to being prominently featured in legitimate wrestling matches against both women and men, she would also be featured twice on the cover of Playboy, and her autobiography reached number one on The New York Times Best Seller list, the fourth by a wrestler to achieve the feat. Miss Kitty, who was Chyna's manager, notably flashed her breasts during Armageddon 1999, consenting to do in a WWF attempt to attract more 18-34-year-old males.

=== Lita and Trish ===
Lita made her WWF debut as a valet for Essa Rios on the February 13, 2000, episode of Sunday Night Heat, where Rios won the WWF Light Heavyweight Championship from Gillberg. During the match, Lita captured the attention of the fans and viewers by mimicking Rios' moves, notably the moonsault and hurricanrana. Lita eventually left Rios' side and allied with The Hardy Boyz, and the trio formed a stable known as Team Xtreme. As a member of Team Xtreme, Lita developed a more "alternative" image, and her popularity greatly increased.

In June 2000, the trio began a storyline with T & A (Test and Albert), with Lita engaging in a rivalry with their manager, Trish Stratus. Lita also began a concurrent feud with WWF Women's Champion Stephanie McMahon, who was promoted at the time as being one of the biggest stars in the company. On the August 21, 2000 episode of Raw, Lita defeated McMahon for the Women's Championship, her first championship win. McMahon would later describe the moment as an "incredible privilege". In 2001, Stratus and McMahon took part in their own storyline revolving around Stephanie's father Vince; Stratus later noted that the female performers had moved from being on the side of storylines to being a "viable part of the program".

== Defections from WCW ==
=== Chris Jericho ===
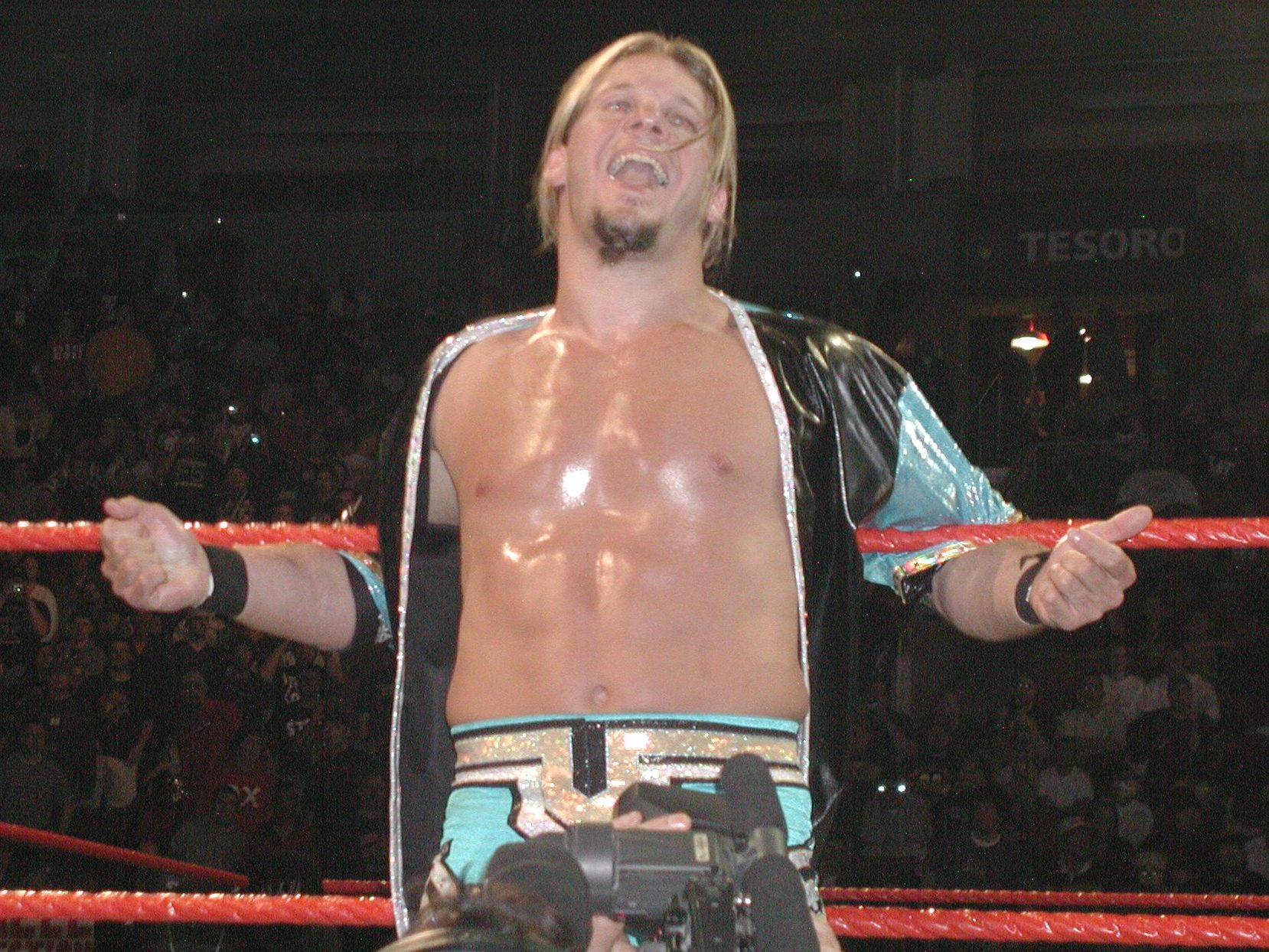
Chris Jericho left WCW for the WWF in 1999

Frustrated over WCW's refusal to allow him to wrestle Goldberg, as well as various other issues, Chris Jericho left WCW and signed with the WWF on June 30, 1999. On the August 9 episode of Raw, he officially made his debut, referring to himself as "Y2J" (a play on the Y2K frenzy) and began feuds with The Rock, Chyna, Kurt Angle and Chris Benoit while capturing the Intercontinental and European championships on several occasions in the era. On the April 17, 2000 episode of Raw, Jericho defeated Triple H to seemingly win the WWF Championship, but the decision was reversed by referee Earl Hebner under pressure from Triple H. Therefore, the company does not officially recognize Jericho's supposed title reign. Jericho continued to feud with Triple H throughout 2000, leading to a Last Man Standing match at Fully Loaded, which Triple H won. Jericho would maintain a prominent spot on the roster, becoming a fixture in both the mid-card and upper-card. Jericho would go on to defeat Stone Cold Steve Austin and The Rock on the same night at Vengeance 2001, becoming the first Undisputed WWF Champion in the process. In the main event of WrestleMania X8, Jericho lost the Undisputed WWF Championship to Triple H.

=== Other notable defectors ===
Many other WCW wrestlers, who were unhappy with the disorganization, backstage environment, and workplace politics of the promotion, jumped ship to the WWF. The first high-profile acquisition was Paul Wight, who had previously wrestled as "The Giant" in WCW since 1995. Wight allowed his WCW contract to expire on February 8, 1999, when Eric Bischoff denied his request for a pay increase. He signed with the WWF the next day and debuted at St. Valentine's Day Massacre: In Your House as "The Big Show" Paul Wight, Mr. McMahon's enforcer in The Corporation. At Survivor Series in November 1999, Big Show defeated The Rock and Triple H in a triple threat match to win the WWF Championship.

In January 2000, Chris Benoit, Eddie Guerrero, Dean Malenko and Perry Saturn left WCW for the WWF. Benoit had just defeated Sid Vicious for the WCW World Heavyweight Championship at Souled Out 2000 on January 17, but the decision was reversed after disputes with WCW management. The quartet made their television debut on the January 31 episode of Raw as audience members and backstage guests of Mick Foley before attacking the New Age Outlaws. They were offered a chance to "win" contracts by defeating members of D-Generation X in a series of three matches. Despite losing all three matches, they were given WWF contracts by Triple H in exchange for betraying Foley. The quartet became known as The Radicalz.

== Increase in violent content ==
=== Hardcore division ===
Brawling in places outside the ring was a staple feature of the Attitude Era, and on November 2, 1998, the Hardcore Championship was introduced when Mr. McMahon gifted Mankind the championship belt. Hardcore matches were no-disqualification, no-count-out, falls count anywhere matches, involving a variety of weapons. Wrestlers would often take their matches outside the ring into other parts of the arena and occasionally outside the arena. Frequent participants in the Hardcore division included Al Snow, Crash Holly, Steve Blackman, and Raven. Raven was the most successful wrestler in this division, winning the championship on 27 separate occasions. Another stipulation was introduced when Crash won the belt, known as the "24/7 rule", meaning the belt was to be defended any place, at any time of day, so long as a referee was present. This rule has allowed the shortest title reigns and quickest title changes in the company's history, and four women have held the Hardcore Championship: Molly Holly (as Mighty Molly), Trish Stratus, Terri Runnels, and one of The Godfather's hos. For the first time, the Hardcore Championship was contested in a ladder match in 2001 at SummerSlam where Rob Van Dam defeated Jeff Hardy. When the Attitude Era ended, the championship was retired and unified with the Intercontinental Championship on August 26, 2002, after Intercontinental Champion Rob Van Dam defeated Hardcore Champion Tommy Dreamer, unifying the titles.

=== Tables, ladders, and chairs matches ===
While members of "The New Brood", The Hardy Boyz faced off against Edge & Christian (the original Brood) in the first-ever tag team ladder match, the final match of the "Terri Invitational Tournament" at No Mercy in October 1999. The Hardys won the match and subsequently the services of Terri Runnels as their manager. During this time, the Dudley Boyz (Bubba Ray and D-Von) debuted in the summer of 1999 following their departure from ECW. They were initially villains and were largely responsible for popularizing the use of wooden tables as weapons in professional wrestling. Bubba Ray, in particular, became notorious for putting women through tables, including Mae Young.

In January 2000, the Dudleys faced off against The Hardy Boyz in the first-ever tag team Table match at the Royal Rumble, which the Hardys won. Eventually, the three teams were brought together in a chaotic triangle ladder match at WrestleMania 2000 for the WWF Tag Team Championship. Edge and Christian won the match and the titles, and this would be the first of several matches involving the three tag teams. Edge and Christian soon developed the "con-chair-to" (a play on the word "concerto") finishing move, which involved the two hitting an opponent's head simultaneously, on opposite sides, with steel chairs (which simulated the clashing of cymbals). This led to then-WWF Commissioner Mick Foley to make the first-ever Tables, Ladders, and Chairs match (TLC) at SummerSlam in August 2000, also won by Edge and Christian. The following year, a second TLC match, dubbed "TLC II", occurred at WrestleMania X-Seven and is widely regarded as one of the greatest wrestling matches of all time. This match, which Edge and Christian yet again won, also featured interference from Rhyno, the lackey of Edge and Christian; Spike Dudley, the half-brother of Bubba Ray and D-Von; and Lita, the stable mate of Matt and Jeff Hardy.

== Reception ==
=== Success ===
At the beginning of the era, when Bret Hart planned his exit from the company, he was reportedly also unhappy with the new direction that the WWF was taking. On November 8, 1997, Vince McMahon responded to WWF fans in an online letter published on his AOL site, where he stated:

In this age of sports-entertainment, the World Wrestling Federation REFUSES to insult its audience in terms of "Baby Faces" and "Heels". In 1997, how many people do you truly know who are strictly "good" guys or "bad" guys? [..] You DEMAND a more sophisticated approach! You DEMAND to be intellectually challenged! You DEMAND a product with ATTITUDE, and as owner of this company--it is my responsibility to give you exactly what you want!

The changes made to create the Attitude Era paid off as it saved the WWF as a company. In 1998, television viewership of Raw Is War doubled. In the ratings war, Raw began matching Nitro. However both companies benefitted from an overall boom in professional wrestling that year, pushing it into mainstream relevance (to levels last seen during the late 1980s) filling up the most watched television shows in the United States, a large increase in PPV sales and a boom in merchandise. Attendance at WWF live events more than doubled, from 1.1 million to 2.5 million, from 1997 to 1999, whereas Raw Is War also became the most watched show on US cable television.

Vince McMahon referred to the revamped wrestling as "storytelling" and that viewers tune in for "entertainment". He also commented, in response to criticism, that wrestling is less violent or sexually suggestive compared to pop culture. Others in the industry called McMahon a "creative genius", praising him for his aggressive and ambitious business style. By 1999, WCW was fading whereas the WWF was continuing to ride the wave of the Attitude Era success. WWF would eventually purchase WCW outright in 2001 and incorporate its properties and talent into the Attitude Era. Wrestlemania 2000 became the highest-grossing non-boxing PPV of all time.

=== Criticism and backlash ===
There was also criticism against the WWF regarding its content and how appropriate it is to children, particularly with wrestling's origins as a family-oriented show. Gimmicks such as The Godfather (a pimp who enlists women in his "whore train") and Val Venis (a pornographic actor), as well as slogans such as the "Suck It" of D-Generation X, were a cause of concern among some parents and others. Eric Bischoff, president of the rival World Championship Wrestling, was not a fan of some of the Attitude WWF content, having said that controversial incidents "advance the idea that pro wrestling is low-brow entertainment, which may dissuade mainstream companies from advertising. ... What (McMahon) is doing is going to further stigmatize the product in terms of entertainment value." WCW's Nitro show did not have such lurid displays of sex. Phil Mushnick had also accused the WWF's content for negative ethnic stereotyping, homophobia and misogyny. Mushnick also wrote, in a January 1999 column, that Raw had turned into "prime-time pornography for children".

WWF programming also became accused by opposers of having been turned into "trash TV". However, the WWF was not alone since there had been a general rise of popularity in trash TV at the time of the Attitude Era. In late 1999, Parents Television Council (PTC) founder L. Brent Bozell III began a campaign to pressure companies to pull advertising from WWF programming, due to the content becoming characterized by "cheap sex, vulgarity and violence of the most sadistic sort". Many Fortune 500 companies had been keen to associate themselves with the WWF due to their transformation into "theater-in-the-round redone as 'roid rage, jam-packed with charismatic, monumental players, prime-time-worthy production values, and labyrinthine plot machinations". Having lost several advertisers for SmackDown, which as a broadcast TV show would de facto adhere to stricter standards compared to cable TV, the campaign forced the WWF to change the content portrayed on their programming, with McMahon saying that there would be "less aggression, less-colorful language, less sexuality", and controversial characters would be appearing less frequently.

The following year, WWF filed a lawsuit against the PTC, claiming they had used threats and lies to drive advertisers away. The PTC accused the WWF of being responsible for several young children's deaths, including that of six-year-old Tiffany Eunick by Lionel Tate, for which Dwayne Johnson received a subpoena to testify in 1998. Shortly before filing the lawsuit, WWF and McMahon had begun a storyline where wrestler Stevie Richards, changed his name to Steven Richards and began attempting to "clean up" the company, forming the "Right to Censor" stable, eventually adding characters previously portraying a pimp (The Godfather) and a porn actor (Val Venis).

In 2001, federal judge Denny Chin threw out a motion put forth by the PTC in an attempt to have the charges dismissed, and the following year the WWF was awarded damages of $3.5 million, and Bozell apologized for the accusations made. In 2001, international broadcaster Channel 4, who aired WWF programming in the United Kingdom, declined to renew their contract, citing the concern of the "increasingly extreme nature" of the programs. This followed Channel 4 being told by the Independent Television Commission earlier in the year that they were wrong to air a violent scene involving a sledgehammer. In Ireland, the Irish Film Classification Office banned 13 home video releases from a possible 70 over a three-year period, with age restrictions on 55 of the 70.

== End of the era ==
=== Departures of Vince Russo, Ed Ferrara, and Chris Kreski ===
On October 3, 1999, Vince Russo and Ed Ferrara abruptly left the WWF and signed with WCW; Russo contends that his reason for leaving the WWF was the result of a dispute with Vince McMahon over the increased workload caused by the introduction of the new SmackDown! broadcast and McMahon's disregard of Russo's family. Vince Russo is credited with inventing the "Crash TV" format of shorter story based TV matches with no matches going into commercial, No matches would go over 8 minutes except a main event, and skit-heavy, personal reality-based television took stories and rivalries beyond the scope of an arena, which led to peak cable television ratings and profitability for the WWF. However, the WCW fanbase, which consisted mainly of rural, older traditional wrestling fans from the Southern States, did not welcome Russo's "Crash TV" formula in their programming and almost entirely stopped watching it altogether. Following the departures of Vince Russo and Ed Ferrara, Chris Kreski would take over the position as head writer of the World Wrestling Federation (WWF). Kreski was later replaced as head writer by Stephanie McMahon following October's No Mercy PPV 2000 event, but remained on the creative team until 2002, when he left to pursue other opportunities.

=== Closure of WCW and ECW ===
In January 2001, AOL Time Warner announced they were to sell WCW to a group of investors called Fusient Media Ventures, with the provision that they would continue television broadcasts on TNT. However, in March, AOL Time Warner announced that they would be ending the broadcasting of professional wrestling across their Turner networks, causing the abrupt end of the sale. Later that week, it was announced that the WWF had purchased the remaining assets and select contracts of WCW from AOL Time Warner for a number reported to be around $7 million, putting an official end to the Monday Night War. Linda McMahon stated that the purchase had great cross-brand potential, and described it as the "perfect creative and business catalyst for our company". Paul Levesque attributed WCW's downfall to a lack of respect, and that WWF would continue to be successful despite the end of the rivalry. The end of WCW was followed in April 2001 by ECW filing for bankruptcy; ushering in the Invasion storyline. In 2003, ECW and its assets were purchased by WWE.

=== WrestleMania X-Seven, Stone Cold's heel turn, and departure of The Rock ===
On April 1, 2001, WrestleMania X-Seven took place and is generally considered as the other main catalyst to the eventual decline of the Attitude Era. The final match of the night was the WWF Championship match between The Rock and Stone Cold Steve Austin, which had a surprise no disqualification stipulation added just minutes before the superstars were introduced. During the match, the two brawled inside and outside of the ring, with both men bleeding after hitting each other with the ring bell. The Rock attempted to place Austin in a Sharpshooter hold, but Austin reversed it into a Sharpshooter of his own. After Rock reached the ropes to force a break, Austin applied the Million Dollar Dream, a submission hold best known from his former gimmick, The Ringmaster. Shortly after, Rock used Austin's own finishing maneuver on Austin by executing a Stunner. Vince McMahon then came to ringside to observe the match. When Rock tried to pin Austin after the People's Elbow, McMahon seized Rock's leg and pulled him off Austin, breaking the pin attempt. After chasing McMahon around the ring, Austin responded by using Rock's signature move, the Rock Bottom. Later, Rock executed a Rock Bottom for a near fall. After Rock attacked McMahon, he was given a Stunner by Austin for a near fall. After Rock kicked out of the Stunner, McMahon handed Austin a steel chair to hit Rock with at Austin's request, revealing that Austin had sided with McMahon, a man he once considered his nemesis. With this, Austin turned heel. Austin attacked him with the steel chair, hitting him sixteen times before pinning him and becoming the new WWF Champion. The show ended with Austin and McMahon shaking hands and sharing beers. Following the April 2, 2001 edition of Raw Is War, The Rock departed on hiatus from the WWF to take time off until he returned to the WWF on July 30, 2001 during the Invasion storyline. The combination of Austin's heel turn, which had a very mixed reception from fans, along with the departure of The Rock and the closing of WCW, effectively ended the boom period.

=== The Invasion and aftermath ===
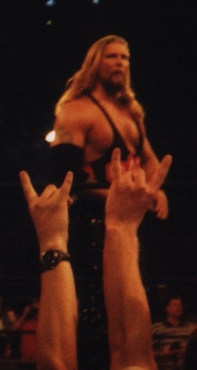
Kevin Nash was a key member of nWo.

In the Invasion storyline, Shane McMahon (kayfabe) acquired World Championship Wrestling (WCW) in March 2001, and WCW personnel invaded WWF. For the first time since the Monday Night War, WWF's purchase of WCW had made a major American inter-promotional feud possible, but the Invasion turned out to be a disappointment to many fans. One main reason would be that many of WCW's big-name stars were still under contract to WCW's old parent company, AOL Time Warner, rather than WCW itself, and their contracts were not included in the purchase of the company. Although these wrestlers could, in theory, choose to sign and appear with the WWF, they instead chose to sit out the duration of their contracts and be financially supported by AOL Time Warner rather than work for the WWF for a low paycheck. These names included Goldberg, Sting, Scott Steiner, Scott Hall, Kevin Nash, Hulk Hogan, and Ric Flair.

On July 9, 2001, the stars of WCW and Extreme Championship Wrestling (acquired by Stephanie McMahon in a related storyline) joined forces, forming The Alliance with WCW owner Shane McMahon and the new owner of ECW Stephanie McMahon leading the charge, with the support and influence of original ECW owner Paul Heyman. At Invasion, Stone Cold Steve Austin turned on the WWF and helped the Alliance win the Inaugural Brawl. At Survivor Series, WWF finally defeated WCW and ECW in a "Winner Takes All" match, and the angle was concluded. In the aftermath of the Invasion angle, WWF made several major changes to their product. Ric Flair returned to the WWF as "co-owner" of the company, feuding with Vince McMahon. Jerry Lawler returned to the company after a nine-month hiatus after his replacement on commentary, Paul Heyman, was fired on-screen by Vince McMahon. Several former Alliance stars were absorbed into the regular WWF roster, such as Booker T, The Hurricane, Lance Storm, and Rob Van Dam. At Vengeance 2001, Chris Jericho went on to unify the WCW Championship and WWF Championship, beating both The Rock and Steve Austin on the same night.

Eventually, Vince McMahon brought back Hollywood Hulk Hogan, Kevin Nash, and Scott Hall to reunite the nWo at the No Way Out pay-per-view in February 2002. However, Hogan proved to be too popular with nostalgic fans yearning for the return of "Hulkamania" and soon turned face at WrestleMania X8 after his classic match with The Rock, which The Rock won. Hulk Hogan would later win the WWF Championship from Triple H at Backlash and become the Attitude Era's final WWF Champion.

=== Raw Is War name change ===
In the aftermath of the September 11 attacks and the upcoming United States invasion of Afghanistan in response weeks later, the WWF changed Raw Is War back to simply Raw on October 1, 2001, to remove the reference to war and to signify that the Monday Night War was indeed over after WWF purchased WCW back in March. As a result, the second hour of War Zone was renamed Raw Zone to coincide with the dropping of the "War" line.

=== Brand extension and WWF draft lottery ===
With an excess of talent employed as a result of having purchased WCW and later ECW, the WWF needed a way to provide exposure for all of its talent. This problem was solved by introducing a "brand extension", with the roster split in half and the talent assigned to either Raw or SmackDown! in a mock draft lottery held on the March 25, 2002, edition of Raw. Wrestlers, commentators, and referees became show-exclusive, and the shows were given separate on-screen General Managers. The brand extension came into effect on April 1, 2002. Later in 2002, after WWE Champion Brock Lesnar announced himself as the exclusive property of the SmackDown! brand and with the creation of the World Heavyweight Championship, all the championships became show-exclusive as well. Additionally, both Raw and SmackDown! began to stage individual bi-monthly pay-per-view events featuring only performers from that brand – only the major four pay-per-views Royal Rumble, WrestleMania, SummerSlam and Survivor Series remained dual-branded. The practice of single-brand pay-per-view events was abandoned following WrestleMania 23. In effect, Raw and SmackDown! were operated as two distinct promotions, with a draft lottery taking place each year to determine which talent was assigned to each brand. The first draft was held to determine the inaugural split rosters, while subsequent drafts were designed to refresh the rosters of each show. This lasted until August 2011, when the rosters were merged, and the Brand Extension was quietly phased out.

=== Rebranding to WWE and the Ruthless Aggression Era ===
On May 6, 2002, the World Wrestling Federation (WWF) rebranded as World Wrestling Entertainment (WWE), after losing a long-running legal dispute with the World Wide Fund for Nature over the use of the "WWF" initialism. WWE altered its "scratch" logo to omit the "F", and also replaced "WWF Attitude" references with "Get the F Out!" references and other slogans referencing "WWE". A month later, on June 10, 2002, Stone Cold Steve Austin failed to appear on that night's episode of Raw and was effectively released from the company; similar events had allegedly taken place in the weeks following WrestleMania X8 stemming from Austin's frustration with his character's direction. Because of the trademark ruling, the company transitioned into its Ruthless Aggression Era on May 6, 2002, and on the June 24 showing of Raw, Vince McMahon officially named the new era as such to motivate the younger roster. The Ruthless Aggression Era featured many elements of the Attitude Era, including similar levels of violence, sexual content, and profanity, whilst placing a greater emphasis on in-ring action.

== Legacy ==
The Attitude Era's success has had a lasting impact. Many consider it the best era of the WWE, or professional wrestling overall, with some fans requesting the WWE to return to the format. On the flip side, others have been critical of the era. Edge, who debuted in 1998, said in a 2014 interview: "The Attitude Era was a lot about the hijinks backstage, and the matches kind of got forgotten about" and "It's looked at with rose colored glasses because the ratings were good, and it was working for obvious reasons, but to me those obvious reasons were characters like Stone Cold, who would then get in and have a long match at a PPV." The "Million Dollar Man" Ted DiBiase said he prefers the PG Era and that while Attitude had good and funny bits, he was not a fan of the "sleazy" content. Commentator Jim Ross said the era had "some embarrassingly bad television" but at the same time "some incredible television that got ratings that were absolutely tremendous."

There has also been criticism for macho sexism produced during this era, albeit one that was familiar in the media during the time of the turn of the century. Stephanie McMahon commented in a documentary that "it was not easy being a woman in that period," referring that the sexiness of female wrestlers was "exploited" during this period. Trish Stratus said that producers would often direct diva matches to be like "catfights" instead of real fighting. In the years after the Attitude Era, female wrestlers received better training, longer matches and more "competition", which became most evident on December 6, 2004 when Trish Stratus and Lita were booked for a high-profile main event match on Raw.

WWE superstar Cody Rhodes said in 2024: "I'm most excited that we no longer have to stand in the shadow of the Attitude Era", referring to the company's recent events such as WrestleMania XL being more successful than in the Attitude Era in numerical terms. Booker T, who wrestled during the Attitude Era from 2001 to 2002, acknowledged its impact and added that while it "was a part of your life and my life", he also stated that "we can't talk about the Attitude Era forever. We need to move past it sooner or later. We're going to have to start talking about this next generation." High levels of violence, sexual content, and profanity were significantly cut back from WWE programming in 2008 when the promotion adapted a more family-friendly format and entered its PG Era, in direct contrast to the Attitude Era; McMahon described the move as having removed the "excess" that was introduced during the Attitude Era.

== Media ==
=== Home video ===
On November 20, 2012, a three-disc documentary set simply entitled The Attitude Era was released on DVD and Blu-ray. The video cover is a collage of WWF Superstars and celebrities of that era, designed as a parody of The Beatles' Sgt. Pepper's Lonely Hearts Club Band album cover. Volume 2 was released in November 2014. Volume 3 was released on August 9, 2016. Volume 4, 1997: Dawn of the Attitude, was released on October 3, 2017. Volume 5, Best of 1996: Prelude to Attitude, was released on November 29, 2021.

=== Video games ===
Many video games were released by WWF based on the Attitude Era, with some of the most notable titles being WWF War Zone, WWF Attitude, WWF WrestleMania 2000, WWF No Mercy, WWF Royal Rumble, WWF SmackDown!, WWF SmackDown! 2: Know Your Role, WWF SmackDown! Just Bring It, WWF Road to WrestleMania, WWF RAW, and WWE WrestleMania X8. The video game WWE '13, which was released in October 2012, paid tribute to the era with its "Attitude Era" mode, which allows the player to re-enact WWF matches and storytelling from SummerSlam in August 1997 to WrestleMania XV in March 1999. Also in WWE '13, there is an "Off Script", including the debut of SmackDown! in April 1999 to the match between Trish Stratus and Lita on Raw in November 2001. The video game WWE 2K14 featured some of the four WrestleMania matches based on the Attitude Era as well, with WrestleMania XIV and WrestleMania XV having previously appeared in WWE Legends of WrestleMania prior to their appearances in WWE '13 and WWE 2K14. The video game WWE 2K16 featured some events of the Attitude Era specifically related to Stone Cold Steve Austin, who was also on the game's cover. On January 23, 2026, 2K Games announced a brand new edition of the "Attitude Era" on the upcoming WWE 2K26 video game with its pre-order on January 30.

=== Music ===
In 1998, the WWF released WWF The Music, Volume 3, which achieved platinum status in the United States, signifying one million sales, while WWF The Music, Volume 4 reached number five in the Canadian Albums Chart in 1999. Following this, WWF and their composer Jim Johnston would collaborate with mainstream hip hop and rock musicians for albums, and Johnston would often hand-pick artists to work with on new theme songs with WWF Aggression album in 2000. In 2001, WWF The Music, Vol. 5 reached number two on the Billboard 200 and number five in the Canadian and UK Albums Chart.

== See also ==
- History of professional wrestling in the United States
- History of WWE
