= ECW Anarchy Rulz (video game) =

2000 video game

- Cover featuring (from left): Justin Credible, Rob Van Dam, The Sandman, Rhino, and Tommy Dreamer
- Developer: Acclaim Studios Salt Lake City
- Publisher: Acclaim Entertainment
- Producer: Troy Leavitt
- Programmer: Scott Pugh
- Artist: Melissa Pardike
- Composers: Andre Hoth; Dean Morrell; Mike Pummell; Mike Tekulve; Keith Fox
- Platforms: PlayStation, Dreamcast
- Release: PlayStation: NA: August 15, 2000; EU: September 1, 2000; Dreamcast: NA: November 28, 2000; EU: February 9, 2001
- Genre: Fighting
- Modes: Single-player, multiplayer

ECW Anarchy Rulz is a professional wrestling video game released by Acclaim Entertainment in 2000 based on Extreme Championship Wrestling (ECW). It was released for the PlayStation and Dreamcast. The last ECW game released, Anarchy Rulz is the sequel to ECW Hardcore Revolution, which was released earlier in the year. Acclaim would later start another wrestling game series with the release of Legends of Wrestling in December 2001.

== Features ==
Financially, ECW Hardcore Revolution was moderately successful, as all of the versions combined had sold over 600,000 copies within the first month of release. The success led Acclaim to quickly commission a sequel. From a critical standpoint however, ECW Hardcore Revolution was disappointingly received due to, among other reasons, the lack of an ECW feel (the game was criticized for being too similar to the earlier WWF Attitude release). Acclaim tried to compensate for this by adding many new match types. Among these are the Table Match, Inferno Match, Dumpster Match, Rage In A Cage, Hate Match, and the Backlot Brawl.

The game featured new control mechanics as well, however these felt very similar to the controls that had been with the series since WWF War Zone. Rounding out the additions is the revamped career mode. There was going to be a Nintendo 64 version of this game but it was cancelled as the console was approaching the end of its life.

This was the last game that was made for ECW before it filed for bankruptcy and was purchased by World Wrestling Entertainment (WWE). Acclaim went on to produce the Legends of Wrestling series. The more recent incarnation of ECW would appear in three games in the WWE Smackdown vs. Raw series (2008–2010).

=== Arenas ===
This game featured five arenas:

- House Stadium - a basic arena that is dark and gray. There are no pyrotechnic or lighting effects during wrestler entrances.
- Brick Stadium - an arena with the stage set often used on ECW television broadcasts and Pay-Per-View events. Entrances sometimes include lighting effects.
- Elks Stadium - an arena loosely based upon the Elks Lodge in Queens, New York. Entrances in this arena may include lighting and pyrotechnic effects.
- ECW Stadium - an arena which features a set that bears a strong resemblance to the ECW Arena in South Philadelphia. Like the Elks Stadium, some entrances will include lighting and pyrotechnic effects.
- Backlot - this space is based on the back lot of a large building. It is a large, concreted area surrounded by fencing and brick walls. There is no ring, meaning that certain moves could not be performed due to a lack of corners or ring ropes. Players can still perform diving attacks from the top of a trash can or fence. There is no commentary either, being replaced with ambient sound effects instead. The crowd is much quieter to simulate them watching the match from inside the building. Various weapons are randomly thrown into the area.

=== Career Mode ===
The career mode returned with two major differences. The fictional Acclaim Title was removed, leaving only two championships in the single-player singles career. This made the mode considerably shorter to play through. The other difference was the addition of a stable career mode.

In each career mode, the player(s) begin at the bottom of the rankings for a championship title. They begin their careers in matches at House show events against weaker opponents. As the player progressed, they began facing an increased caliber and number of opponents at bigger events. While each show was advertised as being in a different city, the difference only depended on the type of show that was scheduled. Each victory moved the player up one ranking place, and a loss moved them down one place. A victory at a pay-per-view event would move them up three ranking places. If the player is at the #1 spot at the time of a pay-per-view event, they would compete for the championship.

Players can save their progress on separate memory card files. However, this will not save any hidden content that has been unlocked by winning pay-per-view or championship matches. These items can only be retained if they save the game in Utilities mode.

In the single-player singles career, the player begins at the lowest rank (#15) for the ECW World Television Championship. If the player manages to win the title, they must defend it in five consecutive matches. Losing any title defense will cost the player the title and move them down to #5 in the rankings. If the player succeeds in all five title defenses, he then moves on to the ECW World Heavyweight Championship division. While competing in this division, the player may compete in a "Battle Royal*" at a pay-per-view. If the player wins this match, they will automatically move to the #1 ranking, but will not get a championship match until the next pay-per-view.

The aim of the tag team career is for the player to have their tag team win the ECW World Tag Team Championship. Each match will either be a tag or tornado rules match. The mode is completed once the player wins the titles, but they can still defend the championship up to 15 times if they wish.

The stable career lets the player control a team of four different characters. They must pick which character(s) will represent them before each match. At the beginning of the mode, the matches are mainly singles and tag matches. As the player progresses, they often become handicap and gauntlet matches. The final match is a Team Rumble. This is the only career mode not to have an associated championship. It ends once the player wins the final Team Rumble.

Each of the three career modes can also be played in multi-player mode. In the tag team and stable careers, players can choose to be allies and work together. If they chose to be rivals, they will often face each other, and will have to take turns when they are not in the same match. The mode ends when a player (or alliance) wins the title. For a multiplayer singles career, the characters skip the ECW World Television Championship and go straight into the ECW World Heavyweight Championship rankings.

=== Belt Tour Mode ===
One of the few features that made the game unique was the un-lockable 'Belt Tour' mode. This consisted of four 'King of the Ring' style tournaments, but could only be played in single-player mode. There was no save function between rounds, so one loss automatically lost the entire tournament. Each mode could have between 0 and 3 added stipulations, depending on game difficulty, tournament selected and progress.

- TV Belt Tour - unlocked when a player won the ECW World Television Championship in 'Career Mode'. The first match would be a normal match, however the semi-finals and finals would also have an added stipulation. Most of the opponents in this mode would be individuals that had never won the ECW World Heavyweight Title in real life.
- Heavyweight Belt Tour - unlocked when a player won the ECW World Heavyweight Championship in 'Career Mode'. The first match would have a special stipulation, with the remaining two matches having as many as three stipulations. A combined 'Iron Man' and Last Man Standing' match is very common. All opponents would be people that had won the ECW World Title in real life, Rob Van Dam or Dusty Rhodes. Completing this mode with different characters on the Hard difficulty setting unlocked new options or characters.
- Tag Team Belt Tour - unlocked when a player won the ECW World Tag Team Championship in 'Career Mode'. There would only be two matches. Both were tag team or tornado matches with at least one added stipulation.
- Toughman Belt Tour - unlocked when a player won the ECW World Heavyweight Championship in a multi-player 'Career Mode'. All three matches would be handicap matches with up to three added stipulations. The first match would be a '1 vs 2' match, with the others being '1 vs 3' matches.

=== Bio Mode ===
In this mode, the player can view each of the 4 alternative costumes of each unlocked character and their attributes. Any titles that the player had earned using that character in 'Career Mode' or 'Belt Tour Mode' are also listed. When viewing a character, the character's theme song plays. The characters are listed in four categories; 'A-M', 'N-Z', 'Jobber' and 'Created'. The last one only becomes available if the player has a created character saved to the same memory card as their main game save.

=== Stables ===
The game also featured stables. These are teams of four characters that can be used in the 'Stable' portion of Career Mode. The 'Impact Players' and 'The Network' were based on actual factions that appeared in ECW. The rest of the default stables were either tag teams with additional members, or just a mixture of stars. Players could also create their own stables, although their options were limited. They could pick four members, a logo, theme music and a team name (maximum of 10 letters including spaces).

=== New / Updated matches ===
Nearly all of the matches, match types and options have returned from ECW Hardcore Revolution. While some new options have been added, others have been updated.

Matches:

- One on Two - this is a 'One on Two' match with the added 'Toughman Match' option from the previous game. This requires the disadvantaged player to defeat both opponents before he can win, but it is now possible to add a third match type option.
- One on Three - as with the 'One on Two' match, the disadvantaged player must beat all three opponents to win. It also allows them to add a third match option.
- VS – in an update to the previous game, Player One only needs to beat 3 opponents in order to win. As before, the other players only need to beat Player One to win.
- Team Rumble – this is the 'Stable Match' from the previous game renamed.
- Hate Match – a match where Player One must face 12 opponents. The match initially begins with Player One against 3 opponents. Once an opponent is defeated, he is replaced with another. Player One must defeat all 12 opponents individually in order to win. If Player One is defeated, only the rivals who are presently in the match are declared winners.
- Tag Tournament – as the name implies, it is a tournament for tag teams, but it is only for four teams, and has only two rounds.

Match options:

- Dumpster Match – a dumpster is placed at the top side of the ring. Opponents can be eliminated by throwing them over the top rope and into the dumpster.
- Table Match – two or four tables are placed at ringside. If any player executes a move close enough to a table, it will break and cause "Extreme" damage to the opponent. A player can also inflict "Extreme" damage to themselves by climbing out of the ring where a table is positioned. The tables cannot be moved and will replenish themselves. It is not necessary to use the table in order to win.
- Rage in a Cage – the ring is replaced with a large cage that fills the arena. While the walls can be climbed, it is not possible to leave this cage. The canvas is much tougher than the ring, so any slams performed on it cause increased damage.
- Backlot Brawl – this match takes place in the truck bay at the back of the arena. The concrete ground causes increased damage, and the area is littered with weapons. Some obstacles may be climbed on. The commentary is replaced with ambient noises.
- Brimstone Match – similar to a 'Battle Royal' but is not restricted to the 4 participants format. The area surrounding the ring is covered with hot coals. To defeat an opponent, the players must throw them out of the ring and unto the coals.

=== Featured music ===
Due to copyright constraints, Acclaim were not allowed to use many of the theme songs used by ECW wrestlers. Instead, they composed similar-sounding themes for the characters, but they were able to secure the rights to four songs which do feature in the game:

- "This is Extreme" by Harry Slash & The Slashtones - this is the main ECW theme, used as the theme song for Paul Heyman, Joey Styles, Joel Gertner, Cyrus, the 'Pure ECW' stable and the 'Commentary' stable.
- "Holy Man" by One Minute Silence - this features as the theme for Dusty Rhodes, Tajiri and Mikey Whipwreck. It is also played at the 'Press Start' screen.
- "Debonnaire" by Dope - this is used as the theme tune for Rhino and the overall game. This was Rhino's actual theme song in ECW.
- "New Jack" - this was a unique track which featured New Jack performing. It was commissioned by New Jack himself to be used as a theme song in ECW, but it never happened. It was intended to be exclusive to the PlayStation format of the game.

=== New moves ===
ECW Hardcore Revolution was heavily criticized for being too similar to WWF Attitude. Many of the moves and taunts appeared in both games, with the former having only a few additional moves. Some moves has simply been renamed (for example, the "Seated Powerbomb" was renamed "Awesome Bomb"). It also featured many duplicate moves that were stored under two different names.

In Anarchy Rulz, there are many unique moves added to the game, with none being removed. Some moves are not assigned to any in-game character or moves set, but can still be applied to user created characters. Selected moves may only be used in certain match types. For example, every corner move with the word "springboard" in the name requires access to regular ring ropes.

The damage system has also been simplified. Each move can only produce one of three different levels of damage intensity. Low damage moves can be performed at any time. Higher damage moves require the player to have earned enough momentum. Performing certain moves on harder surfaces will raise the damage they inflict by one level. If the move causes a table to break in a tables match, it is automatically raised to 'Extreme' (maximum) damage. Finishers and Signature moves cause 'Extreme' damage too, but requires the opponent to have taken a certain amount of damage first. If two players try to execute a move at the same time, the move with the larger "Move Size" gets priority. However, Low damage moves can be used to block some High and Extreme damage move attempts.

== Reception ==
Reception

Aggregate score
Aggregator	Score	
Aggregator	Dreamcast	PS
Metacritic	38/100	43/100

Review scores
Publication	Score	
Publication	Dreamcast	PS
AllGame	1.5/5	2/5
Computer and Video Games	2/10	N/A
Electronic Gaming Monthly	4/10	N/A
Game Informer	3/10	4/10
GameFan	0.1%	N/A
GamePro	N/A	2.5/5
GameRevolution	N/A	D
GameSpot	6.5/10	5.5/10
IGN	N/A	3.8/10
Official U.S. PlayStation Magazine	N/A	1/5

The game received "generally unfavorable reviews" on both platforms according to the review aggregation website Metacritic. However, despite the good graphics, the Dreamcast version was reviewed more negatively than the PlayStation version.

== See also ==
- List of licensed wrestling video games
- List of fighting games
