= WWF Attitude =

1999 professional wrestling video game

- Cover art of WWF Attitude featuring (clockwise from top left) Triple H, Stone Cold Steve Austin, The Undertaker, The Rock, and Mankind
- Developers: Acclaim Studios Salt Lake City; Crawfish Interactive (GBC)
- Publisher: Acclaim Entertainment (Note: Released under the Acclaim Sports label)
- Director: Brett Gow
- Producer: Mike Archer
- Designers: Tim Huntsman; Jeff Robinson
- Programmer: Justin Towns
- Artists: Todd McMullin; Dave Christenson
- Composers: Dean Morrell; Bruce North; Andre Hoth; Roy Wilkins
- Platforms: Game Boy Color, Nintendo 64, PlayStation, Dreamcast
- Release: Game Boy Color: NA: May 24, 1999; EU: June 4, 1999; PlayStation: EU: July 9, 1999; NA: August 5, 1999; Nintendo 64: EU: August 9, 1999; NA: August 31, 1999; Dreamcast: EU: November 5, 1999; NA: November 9, 1999
- Genre: Sports (Fighting)
- Modes: Single-player, multiplayer

WWF Attitude is a professional wrestling video game based on the World Wrestling Federation (WWF, now WWE) released by Acclaim Entertainment in 1999 for the PlayStation and Nintendo 64. A slightly enhanced port of the game was later released for the Dreamcast, as well as a handheld version for the Game Boy Color. The game is named after the WWF's then-current "Attitude" marketing campaign, with the tagline "Get it" also being used on company programming during that period.

The game is the sequel to WWF War Zone and is the last WWF game to be published by Acclaim. The WWF signed a deal with THQ later in 1999, ending a ten-year relationship with Acclaim that began with WWF WrestleMania. Acclaim then signed a deal with Extreme Championship Wrestling (ECW), producing two games using the same game engine, ECW Hardcore Revolution and ECW Anarchy Rulz.

The PlayStation version had been originally scheduled to be released on June 3, 1999, but the release date was pushed back to August 5 due the death of Owen Hart to whom the game is dedicated.

== Gameplay ==
D'Lo Brown, Kane, and Mankind face off in a Triple Threat match.

Gameplay from WWF War Zone was for the most part retained. Players execute wrestling maneuvers by grappling with an opponent then entering a sequence of motions and buttons presses. On-screen life meters indicate how close a wrestler is to defeat, with the meter turning red when a small amount of health is left. The previous edition's "Challenge Mode" was replaced by a Career Mode which allowed a player to wrestle as a WWF superstar. The player first starts wrestling on house shows winning matches to work their way up to RAW, then Pay-Per-View events and eventually getting opportunities to challenge for the European, Intercontinental and WWF championship titles. New match types were also added, including the First Blood and the I Quit Match.

Features added since WWF War Zone include a Create-A-Stable mode and a Pay-Per-View mode, which allows players to set up their own wrestling event - a series of matches, the name of the event, and an arena. The game includes a customizable arena option, including the ability to edit the color of lights, ring ropes, turnbuckles, and logo on the side of the ring. WWF Attitude also features the audio commentary, provided by Shane McMahon and Jerry Lawler.

Create-A-Wrestler mode was expanded with original entrance music, as well as superstar nicknames with unique commentary and crowd chants for each name. Vocals for the original entrance themes were provided by Road Dogg of The New Age Outlaws, a popular wrestler at the time of the game's release who would frequently show off his mic skills during events.

The Game Boy Color version of the game is slightly different from its home console counterparts, using passwords as a way to save a player's progress.

== Development ==
Acclaim added full superstar entrances to the game, improving over the short entrances from War Zone. Match commentary was recorded by Jerry "The King" Lawler and Shane McMahon. Instead of the commentators talking about each of the wrestlers before the match like on War Zone, each wrestler now has a set of pre-match taunts.

Originally, the game was to include fictional jobbers that players would face early on in the Career Mode. For unknown reasons, the fictional jobbers were removed from the game; however, their voices, ring attires, and entrance theme songs remain accessible in the Create-A-Wrestler mode.

In addition, the game's original release date was meant to be March 1999 before getting delayed until June, and then again until its ultimate release in August. Its first planned release date was the time on WWF television when "Dr. Death" Steve Williams was getting a midcard push, where he was managed by a heel Jim Ross. The official strategy guide of WWF Attitude makes mention of this, and "JR's boy" is a chant in the game, referencing the midcard storyline. For many years, players were confused by his inclusion in the game.

Though not playable in the game, Matt and Jeff Hardy provided motion capture for the game.

The intro to the PlayStation and Nintendo 64 versions included a dedication to Owen Hart, who was killed in an abseiling stunt during the Over the Edge pay-per-view on May 23. Hart was featured in the game as a playable character. Although Owen was a "heel" prior to his death, his playable character is a "face", which meant that the crowd would cheer for him instead of booing. His death delayed the PlayStation and Nintendo 64 versions from its initial release of June 1999, likely to remove his Blue Blazer alternative costume as seen in early screenshots from an April 1999 prototype version of the game.

The dedication to Owen was removed from the Dreamcast version because during production, Martha Hart had begun litigation against World Wrestling Federation Entertainment, Inc. and executives, Lewmar Ltd, which provided the abseiling device, the City of Kansas City, Missouri (which owned the Kemper Arena), and WWF employees Bobby Talbert and Matthew Allmen, who were responsible for rigging the abseiling device. However, Owen is still a playable character in this version.

The Dreamcast version was released several months after the PlayStation and Nintendo 64 games, around the same time as THQ's first WWF game WWF WrestleMania 2000 and features improved graphics compared to its PlayStation and Nintendo 64 counterparts, with higher-resolution texture maps and a better animated, less pixelated crowd.

The Game Boy Color version of WWF Attitude (which was released prior to the console versions) featured Sable as a playable character, making her the second active female wrestler on a WWF video game roster and first to appear on a handheld title (Luna Vachon appeared in the console versions of 1994's WWF Raw). The console versions of WWF Attitude featured Sable, Chyna, and Jacqueline as part of the first WWF game roster with multiple active female wrestlers, though all had to be unlocked there.

== Reception ==
Reception

Aggregate score
Aggregator	Score			
Aggregator	Dreamcast	GBC	N64	PS
GameRankings	59%	62%	74%	79%

Review scores
Publication	Score			
Publication	Dreamcast	GBC	N64	PS
AllGame	2.5/5	N/A	3/5	3.5/5
CNET Gamecenter	6/10	N/A	N/A	8/10
Electronic Gaming Monthly	7.25/10 (Note: Four critics of Electronic Gaming Monthly gave the Dreamcast version each a score of 6.5/10, 7.5/10, 8/10, and 7/10.)	4.5/10	8.25/10 (Note: Two critics of Electronic Gaming Monthly gave the Nintendo 64 version each a score of 8/10, and the rest gave it each a score of 8.5/10)	8/10
Game Informer	8.5/10	6.5/10	9.25/10	9/10
GameFan	40%	N/A	N/A	N/A
GameRevolution	B	N/A	N/A	A−
GameSpot	6.8/10	6.1/10	8/10	8.1/10
GameSpy	4.5/10	N/A	N/A	N/A
Hyper	N/A	N/A	68%	N/A
IGN	8/10	N/A	8.7/10	8.3/10
N64 Magazine	N/A	N/A	88%	N/A
Next Generation	1/5	N/A	2/5	N/A
Nintendo Power	N/A	6.3/10	7.4/10	N/A
Official U.S. PlayStation Magazine	N/A	N/A	N/A	4/5

The PlayStation version received favorable reviews, while the rest of the console versions received mixed or average reviews according to review aggregator GameRankings. Daniel Erickson of NextGen gave the Dreamcast and Nintendo 64 versions negative reviews in two separate issues, saying that the latter was "worth a rental for WWF fans, but everyone else should just wait for THQ and EA to take their shots" (#59, November 1999); and later calling the former "a pathetic port – the only reason this game gets one star is that the jewel case was reusable" (#62, February 2000).

The Rookie of GamePro said of the Nintendo 64 version in one review, "If you loved War Zone, you're going to want to grab WWF Attitude. The combination of the huge lineup of wrestlers and excellent gameplay features like the Career mode and create-your-own-pay-per-view event will satisfy any wrestling fan's hunger for topnotch [sic] top-rope action." (Note: GamePro gave the Nintendo 64 version three 4.5/5 scores for graphics, sound, and fun factor, and 4/5 for control in one review.) He also said of the PlayStation version, "If you're a WWF fan, you'll want this game. Its expanded roster of features and wealth of kick-ass wrestling superstars will have you slobber-knockin' and trash-talkin' with your buddies all night long. You smell what The Rock is cookin'?" (Note: GamePro gave the PlayStation version two 4/5 scores for graphics and sound, 3.5/5 for control, and 4.5/5 for fun factor in one review.) The Freshman, however, said in another review that the N64 version's "massive array of options and its long roster of superstars will keep wrestling fans busy for a long time, but its bland graphics and sounds may turn off everyone else. Attitude adds features over War Zone, but it doesn't really make that many improvements. Attitude's got the moves, but it needs to put on more of a show if it's going to go for the title." (Note: GamePro gave the Nintendo 64 version 4.5/5 for graphics, 3/5 for sound, 4/5 for control, and 3.5/5 for fun factor in another review.) In another review of the PlayStation version, The D-Pad Destroyer called it "a decent game with an incredible array of options but with a sore lack of any real personality. Attitude has a great Create-A-Wrestler mode, but eventually you will want to bring your creation into the ring. When it comes to that, WWF fans will have a great time, but the rest will quickly become frustrated. This sequel to War Zone just doesn't have enough attitude." (Note: GamePro gave the PlayStation version two 4/5 scores for graphics and control, and two 3.5/5 scores for sound and fun factor in another review.) The Enforcer later said of the Dreamcast version in one review, "If you own only a Dreamcast and are a diehard wrestling fan, you're gonna want WWF Attitude. If you have either the PlayStation or N64 version, however, you'll be satisfied with a rental." (Note: GamePro gave the Dreamcast version three 4/5 scores for graphics, sound, and fun factor, and 3.5/5 for control in one review.) Scary Larry, however, said of the same console version in another review, "The ultimate wrestling game, one that takes the experience and immerses you totally inside of it, may still be a ways off. But Dreamcast fans will feel cheated out of a winner by this fake looking remake. Hope for Smackdown [sic] on the Dreamcast - Attitude goes flat on you." (The Dreamcast version of WWF SmackDown!, however, was later cancelled.) (Note: GamePro gave the Dreamcast version 4.5 for graphics, and three 3.5/5 scores for sound, control, and fun factor in another review.)

The PlayStation version was also a bestseller in the UK.

== See also ==
- List of licensed wrestling video games
- List of fighting games
- WWE '13 – a later Attitude Era-themed game
