= WWF In Your House (video game) =

1996 video game

- Cover art with Bret Hart, Vader, and Shawn Michaels
- Developer: Sculptured Software
- Publisher: Acclaim Entertainment
- Platforms: PlayStation, Saturn, MS-DOS
- Release: PlayStation: NA: November 21, 1996; EU: December 1996; Saturn: NA: November 23, 1996; EU: 1996; MS-DOS: NA: January 1997
- Genre: Sports
- Modes: Single-player, multiplayer

WWF In Your House is a sports video game released for the PlayStation and Saturn in 1996, then MS-DOS in 1997. Developed by Sculptured Software, it is a follow-up to WWF WrestleMania: The Arcade Game and was published by Acclaim Entertainment, who had previously released WrestleMania for home consoles.

== Gameplay ==
Just like WrestleMania, In Your House is not a wrestling game in the normal sense, as it is heavily influenced by Mortal Kombat. It features digitized sprites of the wrestlers, and many over the top, unrealistic, and magical moves and taunts by the wrestlers. The game also features finishing moves which are performed before the final pin.

Instead of typical wrestling arenas, WWF In Your House featured personalised stages for each individual wrestler, such as a nightclub for Shawn Michaels, Stu Hart's Dungeon for Bret Hart and a crypt for The Undertaker.

The 10 playable wrestlers in the game include Bret Hart, The Undertaker, and Shawn Michaels (all returning from WrestleMania), as well as new additions Owen Hart, British Bulldog, Goldust, Ahmed Johnson, Hunter Hearst Helmsley (who all returned for 1998's WWF WarZone), Vader, and Ultimate Warrior, who was fired prior to release due to contract disputes. In-game commentary is supplied by Vince McMahon and "Mr. Perfect" Curt Hennig.

== Development ==
Early in development, Jeff Jarrett was planned to be part of the roster and was even filmed for the game. When he left the WWF in early 1996 over a contract dispute, his character was scrapped.

== Reception ==
Reception

Review score
Publication	Score
GameSpot	4.5/10 (SAT); 5.9/10 (PS1); 5.6/10 (DOS)

WWF In Your House was a low profile release. At the time Acclaim Entertainment was suffering from financial losses, layoffs, and an investigation by the Securities and Exchange Commission, and was pinning most of its hopes on the Nintendo 64 game Turok: Dinosaur Hunter. Perhaps as a result, WWF In Your House was largely ignored by critics; GamePro only reviewed the PlayStation version, and high-profile gaming publications such as Electronic Gaming Monthly and IGN, and even the official Sega Saturn Magazine, did not review it at all.

GamePro called it "a title full of promise and potential that ultimately gets pinned in its quest for the championship." They particularly criticized that matches are over too quickly, and compared the game unfavorably to Power Move Pro Wrestling, which came out at the same time. Jeff Kitts of GameSpot gave the PlayStation version a 5.9 out of 10. He said the action is solid but overly derivative of Mortal Kombat, and that the selection of modes offers no true variety.

GameSpot's Jeff Gerstmann gave the Saturn version a 4.5 out of 10, calling it "little more than a rehash of the original". Both GamePro and Gerstmann criticized that the gameplay involves little more than pounding the buttons as rapidly as possible, and the style in general is more akin to a fighting game than a true wrestling game. GameSpot's Chris Hudak gave the DOS version a 5.6 out of 10, generally ridiculing the wrestling concept.

== See also ==
- List of licensed wrestling video games
- List of fighting games
