= WWF War Zone =

1998 professional wrestling video game

- Box art picturing Stone Cold Steve Austin in his signature pose
- Developers: Iguana West; Crawfish Interactive(GB) (Note: Additional work by Probe Entertainment)
- Publisher: Acclaim Entertainment (Note: Released under the Acclaim Sports label)
- Producer: Mike Archer
- Designers: Tim Huntsman; Clark Westerman; Richard Reagan; Troy Leavitt; Jeff Robinson; James Daly
- Artist: Jane Bradley
- Composers: Dean Morrell; Mark Ganus; Roy Wilkins; Bob Dayley; Tim Follin (GB)
- Platforms: PlayStation; Nintendo 64; Game Boy
- Release: Game Boy: NA: June 10, 1998; EU: August 28, 1998; PlayStation: NA: July 24, 1998; EU: August 28, 1998; Nintendo 64: NA: August 11, 1998; EU: August 28, 1998
- Genre: Sports (Fighting)
- Modes: Single-player, multiplayer

WWF War Zone is a professional wrestling video game developed by Iguana West and released by Acclaim Entertainment in 1998 for the PlayStation, Nintendo 64, and Game Boy. The game features wrestlers from the World Wrestling Federation (WWF) and was the first graphical 3D game based on the WWF.

Because development of the game began in 1997, it has a number of wrestlers who had already departed the WWF by the time it was released in the summer of 1998, most notably Bret Hart. The game was followed by a sequel, WWF Attitude, released in 1999.

== Gameplay ==
Players can perform each wrestler's signature move, including Steve Austin's "Stone Cold Stunner".

WWF War Zone features a gameplay system in which players must grapple with their opponent and perform a series of presses on the directional pad then a button press to perform wrestling maneuvers. WWF War Zone also features audio commentary provided by Vince McMahon and Jim Ross.

A variety of modes are available. The single player game is highlighted by the "WWF Challenge" mode in which the player selects a character and challenges for WWF titles by beating other wrestlers. Sometimes previously defeated wrestlers will challenge the player to a "Grudge match." These matches will usually be weapons or cage matches. After winning the championship, the player can then defend it against a series of challengers. Various multiplayer options are available such as a free-for-all, two-on-two cage matches, and tornado tag team matches. The game also has a number of unlockable features such as hidden characters. War Zone also includes a training mode in which the player can freely practice the moves of their chosen wrestler. Other gameplay options are also available exclusively in the Nintendo 64 version - gauntlet matches in which players challenge a series of opponents one after the other and Royal Rumble, in which the player must eliminate numerous wrestlers by throwing them over the top rope. Exhibition matches against the computer can also be played, but the computer opponent is always chosen at random.

War Zone also has a create-a-player feature. It allows players to create a custom wrestler, entering a name, customizing various attributes and choosing theme music. Wrestlers of both genders can be created, with various options for skin and muscle tone, as well as body type and in-ring apparel. Individual maneuvers cannot be chosen, though, and an entire set of moves must be copied from one of the game's existing wrestlers.

=== Match types ===
Matches are won when one player meets any of the win conditions within the time limit. They must use a combination of strikes, grapple moves and holds to wear down their opponent's health, thus weakening their resistance to win attempts. Matches can be won by:

- Pin – Using a pin cover while the opponent is lying on his back inside the ring, or using a "Pin" move, to hold an opponent down for a 3 count. Pin attempts are only valid within the ring as long as neither player touches the ring ropes. A third participant can stop a pin attempt by striking either player.
- Submission – Using a "Pain" hold to inflict damage until the opponent gives up. The less remaining health the player has, the less pressure is needed to force a submission. Attempts are only valid within the ring. When a "Pain" hold is applied, players will gradually slide towards the ring ropes. Should either player touch the ropes, the move is released.
- Count out – When either player leaves the ring, voluntarily or otherwise, it will begin a 10 count. Any players who are still outside of the ring when the count reaches 10 will automatically lose. It is possible for all participants to lose at once if they are counted out. The count is restarted each time somebody leaves the ring.
- Decree of Vince McMahon – If the time limit expires, the player with the most remaining health is sometimes declared the winner by default.
- Disqualification – This is a self-inflicted loss. In exhibition "Versus" matches, a player can press a specific button code to call for assistance from another wrestler. However, doing this makes winning impossible. If the advantaged player meets the win conditions, he will still lose by disqualification.

Versus – A regular match which pits 2 players against one another for a preset time limit. Most matches in Career Mode are Versus matches.

Tag Team – These matches feature 2 teams of 2 players facing off. One member of each team is the "legal" (active) player, while the other is inactive on the apron. Players may switch team members at any time using the Tag function. The "illegal" (inactive) partner may assist in the match, but he is limited to 15 seconds of activity at a time. The match ends under normal win conditions involving both legal participants.

Cage – Cage matches see the ring ropes replaced with cage walls. The match can only be won by climbing over a cage wall. Running into a cage wall can cause damage. Players can also perform diving attacks from the top of cage walls. These kinds of matches sometimes appear as Grudge matches in Season Mode.

Weapons – Similar to a Versus match, but the arena is littered with usable weapons. If any object is used or dropped a certain number of times, it will "break" and fade away. Members of the crowd will periodically throw new weapons into the arena. Some larger objects can inflict extra damage if moves are performed on top of them. Pins and submission attempts can also be used outside of the ring. There is no ring-out count. These sometimes feature as Grudge Matches in Career Mode.

Tornado – A tag team match in which all players are "legal" and can participate at the same time. Meeting the win conditions will only eliminate one opponent. To win, the win conditions must be met against both rivals. In order to do a Tornado match, there must be at least two players.

War – A singles match featuring 3 or 4 players. The first player to meet the win conditions over any opponent wins the match.

Royal Rumble (Nintendo 64 only) – Opponents enter in intervals and must be thrown over the top rope to be eliminated. All 16 main characters compete. The last player standing wins.

Gauntlet (Nintendo 64 only) – Exclusive to Player 1; opponents enter one by one in a series of one-on-one matches. If the player loses, the entire match ends.

== Playable characters ==
The game's main roster is composed of 18 wrestlers who were working for the WWF during the game's development, including some from Acclaim's previous WWF title WWF In Your House, such as The Undertaker, Goldust, and Ahmed Johnson. New characters were added, including Stone Cold Steve Austin, Kane, and Ken Shamrock. War Zone also features a number of different factions: D-Generation X is represented by Shawn Michaels and Triple H, while The Nation of Domination is represented by Faarooq and The Rock. Three members of The Hart Foundation were featured: Bret Hart, Owen Hart and The British Bulldog. Both members of The Headbangers (Mosh and Thrasher) were included, as were three of the personas of Mick Foley: Mankind, Cactus Jack, and Dude Love. The latter two were not available at first and needed to be unlocked. Bret Hart and The British Bulldog had departed the WWF in November 1997, following the Montreal Screwjob (Hart and Bulldog would both appear in WCW/nWo Revenge released the same year). Ahmed Johnson left the company in February 1998 and Shawn Michaels temporarily retired in March 1998 after WrestleMania XIV, although he was still contracted with the promotion.

In addition to "Create-A-Wrestler" mode, which allows players to design their own character, there are 3 pre-made characters which can be unlocked. Trainer, who appears in Training Mode, has British Bulldog's moves set. Sue, the belt girl who appears in Season Mode when a championship has been won, has a moves set identical to Bret Hart. Rattlesnake is essentially a fifth attire for Steve Austin, but had maxed out attributes.

There had been rumors of two additional characters, including a second ring-girl, "'Pamela", and one based on Turok, the title character from the Turok: Dinosaur Hunter series. However, these characters could only be made playable via cheat device.

In addition to the main roster and unlockable characters, there are also different attires for each superstar, with some such as Goldust and Stone Cold Steve Austin having more than others.

== Development ==
Early in development, the game was called WWF '98 and featured a different ring and arena. The development team for War Zone consisted of 20 people, 10 each working on the Nintendo 64 and PlayStation versions. Development was begun on the PlayStation as developers waited to receive Nintendo 64 development kits. Space considerations of Nintendo 64 cartridges prevented developers from including the CD-quality audio and full motion video of wrestlers from the PlayStation version. Despite the limited cartridge space, lead programmer Justin Towns (who had previously worked on WWF WrestleMania: The Arcade Game and WWF In Your House for Acclaim) found the Nintendo 64's z-buffering support and the faster speed in creating cartridges over burning CDs to be advantageous during the development process. The game took roughly a year and a half to develop.

Parts of the War Zone game engine were taken from another Acclaim Sports title, NHL Breakaway. One of the developers who worked on Breakaway, John Lund developed the "soft skin" technology that allowed characters to be rendered using models without seam lines. Photos of the actual wrestlers were used to create the "skins" for their models. For the PlayStation version, they used 3D models with more polygons and larger textures. Reduced polygon models and smaller textures were used during four wrestler matches in the PlayStation versions, while the Nintendo 64 used the same models for all matches. Developers found they were able to run the game at up to 640x240 resolution and maintain a constant 30 frames per second. The development team aimed to create a simulation-oriented experience, but with faster gameplay. Motion capture for the game was done by several wrestlers not working for any major professional wrestling promotion, who performed the various moves that were included in the game. Some maneuvers were dropped from the final game due to space and gameplay considerations. WWF announcers Vince McMahon and Jim Ross recorded over an hour's worth of speech for the game's match commentary.

Acclaim stated in early 1998 that the PlayStation version would only support up to two players, reasoning that the installed base for the PlayStation Multitap was too small to justify the additional month of development time needed to put in four-player support. However, by the time of release the PlayStation version did support four players.

The same engine from War Zone would be reused for three follow-up games, ending with the 2000 release ECW Anarchy Rulz.

== Game Boy game ==
A Game Boy version of War Zone developed by Probe Entertainment was released on June 10, 1998. Modes of play include singles, tag team and WWF Challenge. There is also an option to set the difficulty level and length of matches. The game includes some of the wrestlers from the other versions, including Shawn Michaels, Stone Cold Steve Austin, The Undertaker and Kane. All wrestlers share the same moves except for their finishing moves. The Game Boy version of WWF War Zone also omits Bret Hart and the Headbangers.

== Reception ==
Reception

Aggregate score
| Aggregator | Score | | |
| Aggregator | Game Boy | N64 | PS |
|---|---|---|---|
| GameRankings | 52% | 85% | 80% |

Review scores
| Publication | Score | | |
| Publication | Game Boy | N64 | PS |
|---|---|---|---|
| AllGame | N/A | N/A | 4/5 |
| CNET Gamecenter | N/A | 9/10 | 9/10 |
| Consoles + | N/A | 89% | N/A |
| Computer and Video Games | N/A | 3/5 | 3/5 |
| Electronic Gaming Monthly | N/A | 8/10 (Note: In Electronic Gaming Monthly's review of the Nintendo 64 version, one critic gave it a score of 7.5/10, two critics gave it each a score of 8/10, and the other one gave it 8.5/10.) | 7.875/10 |
| Game Informer | N/A | 8.75/10 | 9.5/10 |
| GameRevolution | N/A | A− | A− |
| GameSpot | N/A | 8.7/10 | 8.6/10 |
| Hyper | N/A | 86% | N/A |
| IGN | N/A | 8.5/10 | 8/10 |
| N64 Magazine | N/A | 85% | N/A |
| Next Generation | N/A | N/A | 3/5 |
| Nintendo Power | 5.2/10 | 7.4/10 | N/A |
| Official U.S. PlayStation Magazine | N/A | N/A | 4/5 |
| Entertainment Weekly | N/A | N/A | B |

The Nintendo 64 and PlayStation versions received "favorable" reviews, while the Game Boy version received "mixed" reviews, according to video game review aggregator platform GameRankings.

Jeff Gerstmann of GameSpot complimented the gameplay and graphics and called the Nintendo 64 version the best wrestling game on the system. He called the PlayStation version the "best wrestling package ever released and shouldn't be missed by anyone with even a passing interest in wrestling." IGN's Douglass C. Perry complimented said version's presentation, speed of the gameplay and the in-depth create-a-wrestler mode in his review of the PlayStation version. Perry wrote that the game encompassed everything gamers were looking for in the wrestling game genre. Anthony Baize of AllGame wrote that said version was "able to set itself aside from other games in the genre and offer players some newer, innovative options." Matt Casamassina also praised the game's graphics in his review of the Nintendo 64 version, calling it "the best looking wrestling game ever made." While he faulted the game for its collision detection, static cutscenes and small selection of wrestlers, he recommended the game and anticipated the release of a sequel. Tim Hsu of GameRevolution also offered praised for the N64 version's presentation, multiplayer options and create-a-wrestler mode. However, he expressed disappointment with its limited single-player mode. Nevertheless, he wrote that the game was good enough that it might even appeal to gamers who were not fans of professional wrestling.

Johnny Ballgame of GamePro said that the PlayStation version was "not only the best wrestling game on the PlayStation, it's one of the most fun fighting games[,] period. As D-Generation X might say, 'Two words: Buy it!'" (Note: GamePro gave the PlayStation version three 5/5 scores for graphics, sound, and fun factor, and 4.5/5 for control.) However, Scary Larry said that the Nintendo 64 version "provides the thrills and spills of an all-out street fight, but with much better scripting." (Note: GamePro gave the Nintendo 64 version two 4.5/5 scores for graphics and fun factor, 5/5 for sound, and 4/5 for control.) Next Generation said that the former console version was "largely idiotic fun and especially great in multiplayer mode (up to four with a multitap). But it's the huge wealth of options and detail (including interactive player biographies) that makes the game shine and ultimately a great purchase... if you like professional wrestling."

The PlayStation and Nintendo 64 versions were both finalists by the Academy of Interactive Arts & Sciences for "Console Fighting Game of the Year" during the 2nd Annual Interactive Achievement Awards, which ultimately went to WCW/nWo Revenge. The game was also nominated for Best Nintendo 64 Game at the 1998 CNET Gamecenter Awards, which went to The Legend of Zelda: Ocarina of Time.

The game gained favor with gamers and was a popular rental title in the U.S. for months after its release. The game was also a bestseller in the UK. According to the NPD Group, it was the eighth best-selling video game of 1998 by unit sales. War Zone sold more than 1 million copies within a year of its release. By 2004, it was reported that the PlayStation version specifically sold over 2.2 million copies.

== See also ==
- List of licensed wrestling video games
- List of fighting games
