= John Layfield =

American professional wrestler (born 1966)

John Bradshaw Layfield
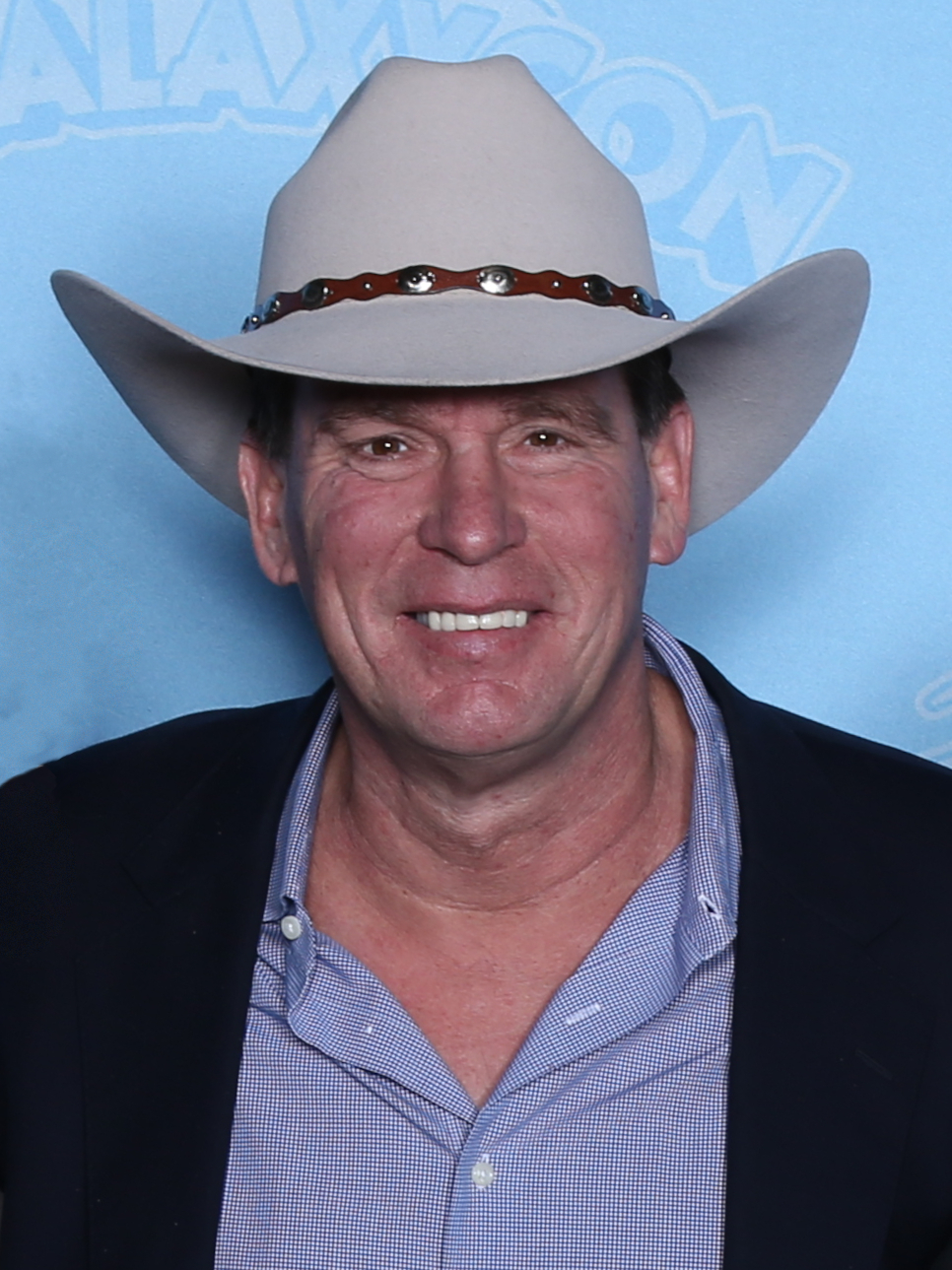
- Layfield in 2022
- Born: John Charles Layfield; November 29, 1966 (age 59); Sweetwater, Texas, U.S.
- Education: Abilene Christian University
- Spouses: Cindy Womack (m. 1994; div. 2003) Meredith Whitney (m. 2005)
- Professional wrestling career
- Ring name(s): Blackjack Bradshaw; Bradshaw; Death Mask; John "Bradshaw" Layfield; JBL; John Hawk; Johnny Hawk; Justin "Hawk" Bradshaw; Vampiro Americano
- Billed height: 6 ft 6 in (198 cm)
- Billed weight: 290 lb (132 kg)
- Billed from: Sweetwater, Texas (as Blackjack Bradshaw); New York City (as John Layfield) "Bradshaw Ranch" in Roscoe, Texas (as Justin "Hawk" Bradshaw)
- Trained by: Black Bart; Brad Rheingans
- Debut: September 23, 1992
- Retired: April 5, 2009
- Football career

No. 61
- Positions: Offensive lineman, Right tackle

Career information
- High school: Sweetwater (TX)
- College: Abilene Christian
- NFL draft: 1990: undrafted

Career history
- Los Angeles Raiders (1990)*; San Antonio Riders (1991)
- * Offseason or practice squad member only

John Charles Layfield (born November 29, 1966), better known by the ring name John "Bradshaw" Layfield, is an American professional wrestling color commentator, retired professional wrestler and former football player. He is signed to WWE, where he is an ambassador and commentator for the company.

Layfield rose to prominence in WWE during its Attitude Era under the ring name Bradshaw, during which time he became a three-time WWF Tag Team Champion with Ron Simmons as part of the Acolytes Protection Agency (APA) or simply the Acolytes, a feared pair of strong and tough mercenaries who, aside from occasionally wrestling and doing "work" for "clients" spent most of their time sitting around in their "office" playing cards, drinking beer, fighting people backstage and then going out to bars and getting into bar fights. In 2004, Simmons retired and the APA separated, and Layfield was rebranded as the heel character JBL— a rough-mannered, brawling, blustering, bad-tempered and bigmouthed Texas elite businessman, driven into the arena by limousine. The gimmick was built off of Layfield's real-life accomplishments as a stock market investor. Later that year, he captured the WWE Championship and held it for 280 days, at the time the longest reign since Diesel’s one year long reign from 1994 to 1995. A month before his in-ring retirement at 2009's WrestleMania 25, he became Intercontinental Champion, which made him the 20th Triple Crown Champion and the 10th Grand Slam Champion in WWE history.

After his retirement, Layfield became an on-air commentator for WWE programming. Layfield was inducted into the 2021 WWE Hall of Fame as a member of the Class of 2020. Layfield is currently a finance commentator and is featured regularly on Fox News and Fox Business. He is also employed by Northeast Securities as its senior vice president. He also currently serves as an English color commentator for WWE's sister promotion Lucha Libre AAA Worldwide (AAA) based in Mexico.

== Early life ==
Layfield was born on November 29, 1966, in Sweetwater, Texas.

== Football career ==
Layfield was a collegiate American football player for Trinity Valley Community College and for Abilene Christian University. At Abilene, Layfield was a two-year starter on the offensive line and was named first-team All-Lone Star Conference as a junior and senior. Layfield signed with the Los Angeles Raiders as an undrafted free agent, but was released before the 1990 season began. Layfield did play in the World League of American Football, starting all 10 games of the 1991 season at right tackle for the San Antonio Riders, wearing jersey number 61. Future Dallas Cowboys head coach Jason Garrett was the quarterback of that team.

== Professional wrestling career ==
=== Early career (1992–1996) ===
Layfield was trained initially by Black Bart and Brad Rheingans. He debuted in September 1992 in the Global Wrestling Federation (GWF) in Texas. His first gimmick was as "John Hawk," storyline cousin of the Windham brothers. He formed the tag team "Texas Mustangs" with Bobby Duncum Jr.; they quickly won the GWF Tag Team Championship from Rough Riders (Black Bart and Johnny Mantell) on November 27 but dropped the titles to The Bad Breed (Ian and Axl Rotten) on January 29, 1993.

In January 1993, Layfield went on his first overseas trip to Japan, wrestling for George and Shunji Takano's Network of Wrestling. Later that same year, he would also wrestle in Mexico for Consejo Mundial de Lucha Libre (CMLL), wrestling under the name "Vampiro Americano" and frequently teamed with Vampiro Canadiense. He would also wrestle for Federacion Internacional de Lucha Libre, where he won its Heavyweight Championship. Hawk won his second GWF Tag Team Championship with Black Bart on December 25, 1993, from Steve Dane and Chaz Taylor, eventually losing them to The Fabulous Freebirds (Jimmy Garvin and Terry Gordy) on June 3, 1994.

In June 1994, he went to Europe and toured Austria and Germany for Otto Wanz's Catch Wrestling Association (CWA) for the remainder of the year. In January 1995, Layfield joined NWA Dallas. He won the NWA North American Heavyweight Championship on January 14, 1995, defeating Kevin Von Erich. Two months later, he lost the NWA North American title to Greg Valentine. He wrestled for NWA Dallas until May 1995.

In June 1995, Layfield returned to Japan, but with NOW recently folded, he went to Genichiro Tenryu's WAR, where he went by the name "Death Mask." From June to December 1995, he wrestled in Austria and Germany for the Catch Wrestling Association, where he won its World Tag Team Championship with Cannonball Grizzly in November 1995. He was set to join Smoky Mountain Wrestling in December 1995, to wrestle Buddy Landel, but this did not happen due to the company closing in November. From December 1995 to February 1996, he performed for the Confederate Wrestling Alliance in Dallas, Texas.

=== World Wrestling Federation/Entertainment/WWE (1995–present) ===
==== Early years (1995–1997) ====
In December 1995, Layfield (as "John Hawk") debuted in the World Wrestling Federation, losing to Savio Vega in a dark match. He made his televised debut on the January 27, 1996, episode of WWF Superstars as "Justin 'Hawk' Bradshaw," defeating Bob Holly. His initial gimmick was that of a rough and tumble Texas cowboy (similar in terms of appearance and character to Stan Hansen), with Uncle Zebakiah as his manager. After victories, he branded his opponents with the symbol "JB" in ink, rather than being seared into the flesh. Bradshaw remained undefeated for three months until a loss to The Undertaker via disqualification on the April 1 episode of Raw. He lost a Caribbean Strap Match to Savio Vega on the September 22, 1996, PPV In Your House 10: Mind Games. The character fizzled out by the end of the year, perhaps remembered only for a feud with Savio Vega and a match with Fatu which he won in eight seconds. Following a handicap match loss to Jesse James on December 9, Bradshaw attacked Zebekiah, who accidentally cost them the match. Afterwards, Bradshaw would work in house shows until February 1997.

==== The New Blackjacks (1997–1998) ====
In February 1997, Layfield paired up with his storyline cousin Barry Windham to form The New Blackjacks, Layfield cut off his long hair and completed with the traditional "Blackjack" handlebar mustaches and short, dyed black hair. They competed in a four-way tag team match at WrestleMania 13, which was won by The Headbangers. They then feuded with The Godwinns. In late 1997 Bradshaw traveled to the United States Wrestling Association (USWA) where he competed as a singles wrestler (without Windham). During his time in the USWA he helped his former manager in the WWF, Dutch Mantel (also known in the WWF as Uncle Zebekiah) defeat Jerry Lawler for the USWA Unified World Heavyweight Championship.

Windham's injuries piled up throughout 1997 and Layfield wrestled only occasionally on TV as Blackjack Bradshaw worked for All Japan Pro Wrestling from November to December of that year. The team disbanded in January 1998. Bradshaw then formed a short-lived alliance with Chainz who just broke away from the Disciples of Apocalypse stable. He earned a shot at the NWA North American Heavyweight Championship against Jeff Jarrett at No Way Out of Texas: In Your House and won by disqualification, but Jarrett retained the title because a title cannot change hands by a disqualification. In 1998, he wrestled as a mid-carder wrestling the likes of Marc Mero at Mayhem in Manchester, Kaientai (Funaki, Dick Togo, and Men's Teioh) with Taka Michinoku in a handicap match at Over the Edge in which Michinoku was pinned. Sometimes teaming with fellow Texan Terry Funk. He defeated Vader in a Falls Count Anywhere Match at Breakdown .

==== Acolytes Protection Agency (1998–2002) ====
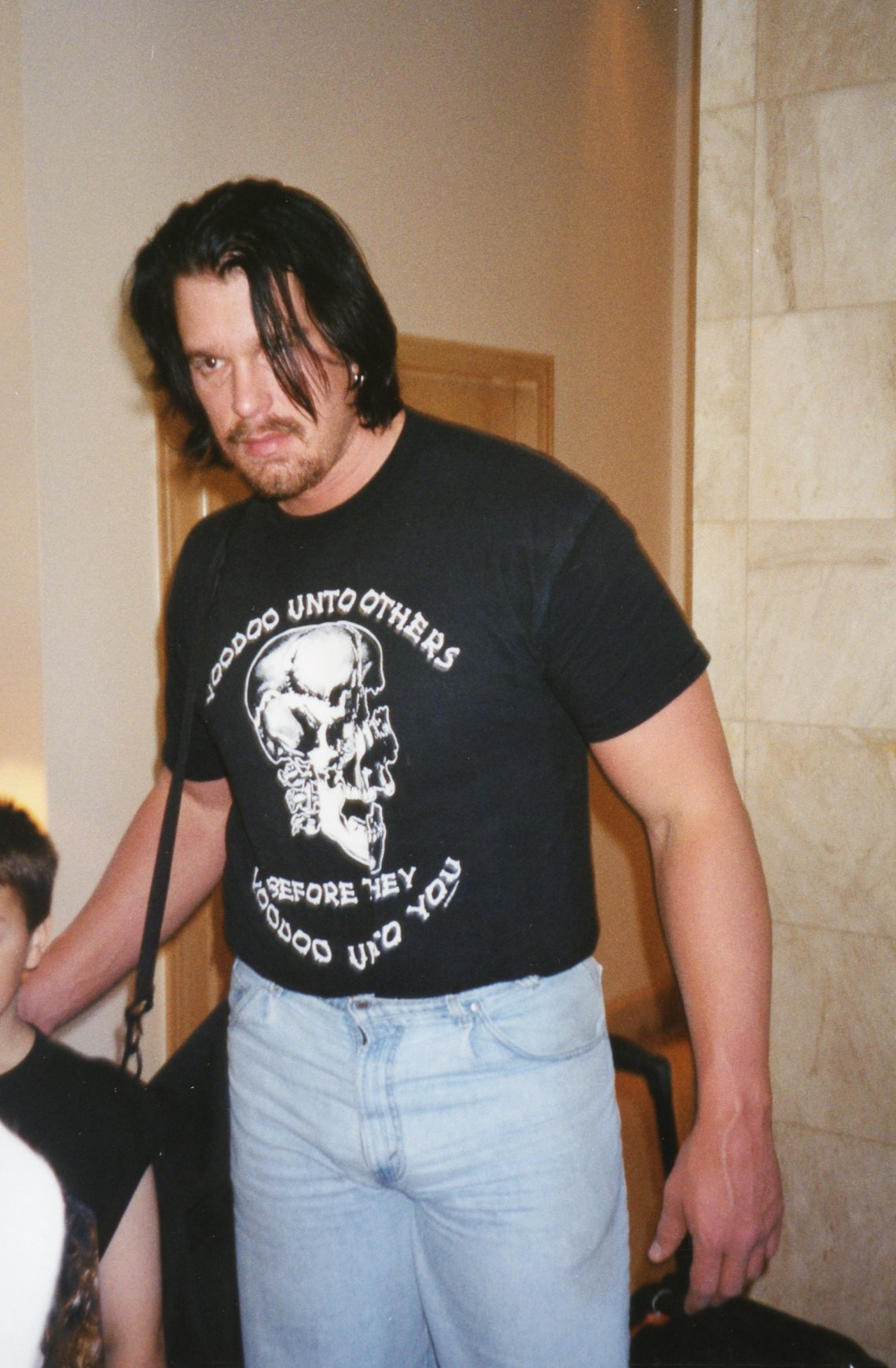
Bradshaw during his time with the Acolytes Protection Agency

On Sunday Night Heat right before Survivor Series 1998, Bradshaw teamed alongside former Nation of Domination leader Faarooq to form the tag team of the Acolytes, managed by the Jackyl. Their main gimmick was that of a dark duo known for their unrepentant savagery against their opponents, occult symbols painted on their chest and the Necronomicon "gate of Yog-Sothoth" pentagram symbol on their black tights. Bradshaw would grow a goatee and let his hair go long. After the Jackyl left the WWF, Faarooq and Bradshaw joined The Undertaker's new Ministry of Darkness. The Ministry went on to feud with the Corporation. As part of the Ministry, Bradshaw feuded with Ken Shamrock. The two stables would soon unite as the Corporate Ministry, but disbanded after Stone Cold Steve Austin defeated the Undertaker at Fully Loaded. When the Undertaker went on hiatus in September, Bradshaw and Faarooq's dark gimmick faded.

On the May 31, 1999, episode of Raw Is War, the Acolytes (still with the Corporate Ministry) won their first WWF Tag Team Championship by defeating Kane and X-Pac. On the July 5 episode of Raw Is War, they dropped the titles to the Hardy Boyz (Matt and Jeff) before defeating the Hardyz and their manager Michael "P.S." Hayes at Fully Loaded for their second WWF Tag Team Championship. On the August 9 episode of Raw Is War, they lost the titles to Kane and X-Pac.

The duo became fan favorites and changed their gimmick to that of cigar-smoking bar brawlers for hire. In jeans and T-shirts, Faarooq and Bradshaw became the Acolytes Protection Agency (APA), with a motto of "because we need beer money." The duo was often seen in the backrooms of arenas with a poker table and later a framed doorway comically in the middle of the often large, open aired hallways, which they insisted anyone who came to speak to them use.

The Acolytes earned a shot at the WWF Tag Title at the Royal Rumble against the New Age Outlaws (Road Dogg and Billy Gunn), but lost the match. Their next shot at the title was at Fully Loaded when they faced Edge and Christian. The Acolytes won the match by disqualification but did not become champions. After unsuccessfully challenging for the tag title in 2000, APA won their third WWF Tag Team Championship on the July 9, 2001, episode of Raw is War by defeating the Dudley Boyz (Bubba Ray and D-Von). On the August 9 episode of SmackDown!, they lost the tag title to Alliance members Diamond Dallas Page and Chris Kanyon.

On the October 22 episode of Raw Is War, Bradshaw defeated The Hurricane to win the WWF European Championship, his first singles title in the WWF. He lost the title to Christian on the November 1 episode of SmackDown!. At No Way Out in 2002, APA won a Tag Team Turmoil match and as a result, they challenged for the tag title at WrestleMania X8 along with Hardys and Dudleys, in a Four Corners Elimination match. The champions Billy and Chuck retained their title.

==== Singles competition (2002–2003) ====
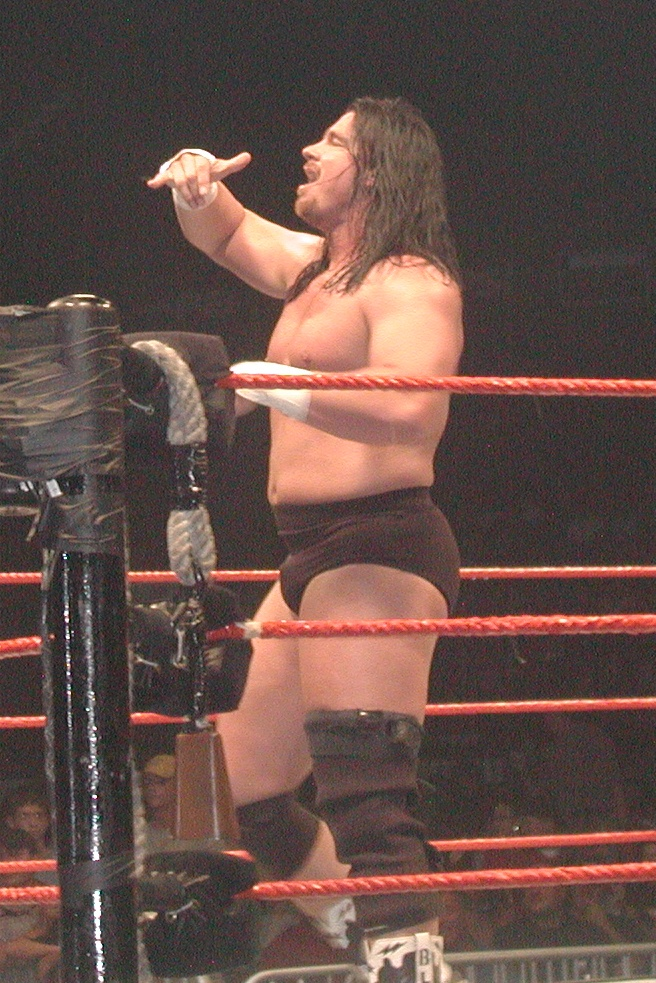
Layfield at a 2002 house show during his time as Bradshaw

Shortly after WrestleMania, Faarooq and Bradshaw split due to the brand extension. Bradshaw was drafted to Raw where his gimmick had an increased emphasis on his Texas roots, which included him carrying a cowbell to the ring and teaming up with fellow Texan Stone Cold Steve Austin. Bradshaw helped Austin in Austin's feud against the nWo, teaming up with him against them and had a brief feud with Scott Hall where he faced Hall at Backlash on April 21 in a losing effort due to interference by X-Pac. Following Austin's walkout on the WWE, Bradshaw joined the hardcore division and won the WWE Hardcore Championship 17 times; his first title win coming over Steven Richards on the June 3 episode of Raw. He renamed the title the Texas Hardcore Championship. It was also during this time that his finishing move was briefly renamed from the "Clothesline From Hell" to the "Clothesline From Texas" or the "Clothesline From Deep in the Heart of Texas." Jim Ross often called the move as such during his commentary, although the name eventually reverted to the original "Clothesline From Hell."

In the hardcore division, Bradshaw feuded and exchanged the title with the likes of Richards, Shawn Stasiak, Raven, Christopher Nowinski, Big Show, Justin Credible, Johnny Stamboli, Crash Holly, Jeff Hardy, and Tommy Dreamer, before the title was unified by WWE Intercontinental Champion Rob Van Dam in August. In September, Bradshaw suffered a torn left biceps at a house show. He was out of action for six months until returning to Ohio Valley Wrestling and then a few weeks later to the active WWE roster.

==== APA reunion (2003–2004) ====
Bradshaw returned on the June 19, 2003, episode of SmackDown!, which saw him and Faarooq saving the Undertaker from the hands of Chuck Palumbo and Johnny Stamboli, reuniting the APA in the process. Bradshaw returned with a new look, cutting his long hair, returning it to its natural color blonde, and going clean shaven. On the June 26 episode of SmackDown!, the APA and the Undertaker defeated Stamboli, Palumbo and Nunzio. At Vengeance on July 27, Bradshaw won a bar room brawl match which featured Faarooq and a variety of mid-card superstars and other WWE employees. The duo lost to The Basham Brothers at No Mercy on October 19.

On the October 30 episode of SmackDown!, the APA defeated Big Show and Brock Lesnar by disqualification after Lesnar attacked Faarooq with a steel chair. On the November 13 episode of SmackDown!, Bradshaw defeated A-Train. At Survivor Series on November 16, Bradshaw was part of Kurt Angle's team, as they faced Brock Lesnar's team in a five-on-five tag team match. Bradshaw managed to eliminate A-Train, before he himself was eliminated by Big Show. His team eventually won the match. Bradshaw was defeated by A-Train on the November 20 episode of SmackDown!, ending their brief feud. At WWE Tribute to the Troops on December 25, the APA defeated The World's Greatest Tag Team.

At the Royal Rumble on January 25, 2004, Bradshaw entered into the Royal Rumble match at entry number 5, but quickly was eliminated by Chris Benoit. At No Way Out on February 15, the APA faced the World's Greatest Tag Team in a losing effort. At WrestleMania XX on March 14, the APA unsuccessfully challenged for the WWE Tag Team Championship in a fatal four-way tag team match. The gimmick continued on-and-off until the March 18 episode of SmackDown! until losing a tag team "You're Fired" match to WWE Tag Team Champions Rikishi and Scotty 2 Hotty for the tag team title. general manager Paul Heyman, frustrated by an insult by the APA, told Faarooq that if he did not win the aforementioned match, then "You're Fired." After the match, Bradshaw led Faarooq back to Heyman's office to state they had not been fired, but had resigned. Then, Heyman cleared up the misunderstanding and pointed out that he said that if they did not win the titles, then he told Faarooq "You're fired." His reason for saying this directly to Faarooq was because it applied only to Faarooq because "WWE Management" still saw a lot of potential in Bradshaw. He left them after telling Bradshaw to think about his own future. Faarooq shouted after Heyman that he was not fired because they (Faarooq and Bradshaw) had quit. Bradshaw, however, hesitated. Faarooq took Bradshaw's hesitation to mean that he would not resign, and so Faarooq promptly disbanded the APA and left. This turned Bradshaw heel. In reality, the WWE had decided to stop using Ron Simmons as an on-air performer due to health issues. He was initially released, but he was later re-hired to work behind the scenes in the WWE under various roles.

==== WWE Champion (2004–2005) ====
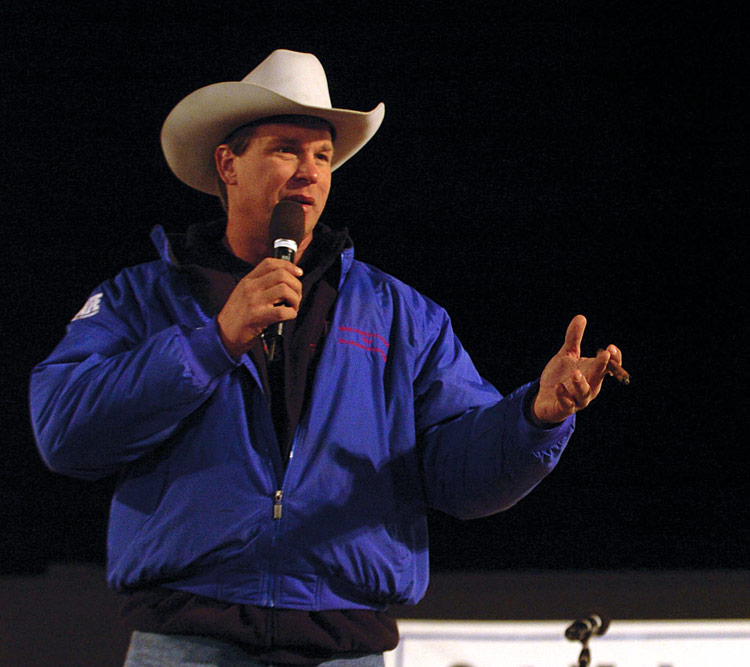
After splitting from Faarooq, Bradshaw rechristened himself as John "Bradshaw" Layfield, an arrogant Texan millionaire

After the on air character of Faarooq disappeared from WWE television, Bradshaw proceeded to take on a J. R. Ewing esque gimmick, complete with a suit, cowboy hat, and tie. Bradshaw began his first main event push as Kurt Angle and Big Show were injured and Brock Lesnar left the company, with someone needed to face the current WWE Champion Eddie Guerrero. Bradshaw began referring to himself as John "Bradshaw" Layfield, or JBL. JBL's finishing move's name was part of the overhaul, becoming the Clothesline from Wall Street until he later changed it back to its original name. JBL's first promo was on the border between Texas and Mexico, where he hunted for incoming illegal immigrants to win a "Great American Award," which granted the winner number one contendership to the WWE Championship. JBL won, thanks to the then-SmackDown! general manager Kurt Angle, and immediately challenged Eddie Guerrero for the title.

At Judgment Day on May 16, JBL defeated Guerrero via disqualification in a match for the WWE Championship, but since a title cannot change hands by disqualification, Guerrero retained the title. JBL won his sole world championship, the WWE Championship from Guerrero in a Texas Bull Rope match at The Great American Bash on June 27. Years later: The Undertaker admits the result was changed by Vince McMahon due to his impassioned "In His Own Words" promo. JBL won a rematch in a steel cage two weeks later on the July 15 episode of SmackDown!, again with Angle's assistance.

After JBL claimed he would not be defending the WWE Championship at SummerSlam on August 15, The Undertaker challenged him for the title. Around this time, JBL hired Orlando Jordan to help him in title matches. At SummerSlam, JBL won the match by disqualification after The Undertaker hit him with the title belt. After the match, The Undertaker chokeslammed JBL through the roof of his limousine. While JBL wore a halo complete with his cowboy hat on top for the next few weeks to sell his "injuries," SmackDown! general manager Theodore Long ultimately booked a Last Ride match for the title at No Mercy on October 3. JBL retained the title with some help from Heidenreich.

Though JBL held the title for many months, most title matches were won controversially. At Survivor Series on November 14, JBL defeated Booker T to retain his WWE Championship by hitting Booker T in the face with the title belt when the referee was knocked out. JBL defeated Eddie Guerrero, The Undertaker, and Booker T in a Fatal Four-Way at Armageddon on December 12 after a run-in by Heidenreich, who incapacitated The Undertaker, allowing JBL to take advantage and hit Booker T with the Clothesline From Hell to get the pinfall victory.

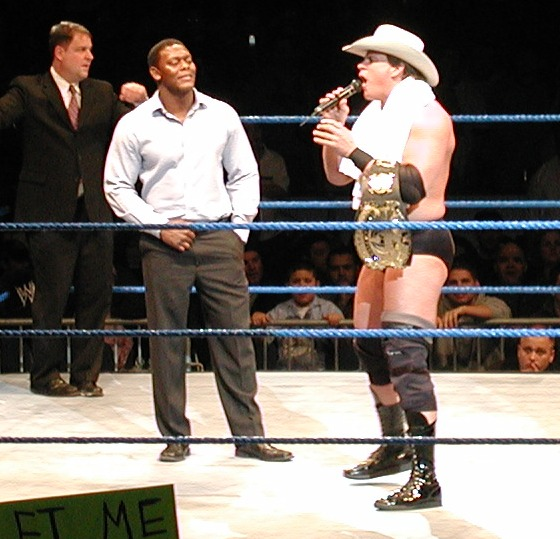
The Cabinet: "Chief of Staff" Orlando Jordan and Layfield, then WWE Champion

During JBL's time as WWE Champion, he employed a stable named "The Cabinet." At its peak, the stable contained Orlando Jordan, who was JBL's "Chief-of-Staff" and Doug and Danny Basham, who were his "Co-Secretaries of Defense" until quitting the Cabinet on the June 16, 2005, episode of SmackDown!. Amy Weber was also a member, being JBL's image consultant, but later left WWE. WWE explained Weber's absence by saying that JBL fired her after an episode of SmackDown! taped in Japan. That episode saw Weber accidentally shoot JBL with a tranquilizer gun. Jordan is the only member not announced to have left the group, though mention of the term cabinet went on hiatus after SummerSlam and Orlando was released from WWE in May 2006.

JBL defended the title at the Royal Rumble on January 30, 2005, against Big Show and Kurt Angle in a Triple Threat match when he pinned Angle after the Clothesline From Hell and against Big Show in a Barbed Wire Steel Cage match at No Way Out on February 20, when Big Show chokeslammed JBL off the top rope through the ring and JBL later crawled out from under the ring apron, winning the match by escape. On the next episode of SmackDown!, JBL had a "Celebration of Excellence" in which he and his Cabinet celebrated the fact that he was the longest-reigning WWE Champion in 10 years, a party which was broken up and ruined by Big Show and newly crowned number one contender John Cena.

JBL lost the WWE Championship to John Cena at WrestleMania 21 on April 3. JBL's unbroken nine-month reign was billed as the longest in a decade, lasting 280 days. On the April 28 episode of SmackDown!, JBL defeated Big Show, Booker T, and Kurt Angle in a fatal four-way elimination match to earn a rematch for the WWE Championship, but lost to Cena at Judgment Day on May 22 in an "I Quit" match.

On June 12, JBL appeared at the WWE-promoted ECW One Night Stand pay-per-view as an anti-ECW "crusader." In the course of the night, he attacked The Blue Meanie in a shoot. WWE capitalized on the situation by resigning Meanie to a short-term contract. On the July 7 episode of SmackDown!, Meanie was reunited with his old The Blue World Order associates Nova and Stevie Richards and he defeated JBL with the help of the World Heavyweight Champion Batista, who was drafted to SmackDown! a few weeks after Cena was drafted to Raw. JBL and Batista then met in a match at The Great American Bash on July 24 for the World Heavyweight Championship. JBL won the match by disqualification, after Batista hit JBL with a steel chair, but since a title does not change hands by disqualification, Batista retained the title. At SummerSlam on August 21, Batista defeated JBL in a No Holds Barred match to retain the World Heavyweight Championship. JBL lost another rematch with Batista on the September 9 episode of SmackDown! in a Texas Bullrope match, ending the feud.

==== United States Champion (2005–2006) ====
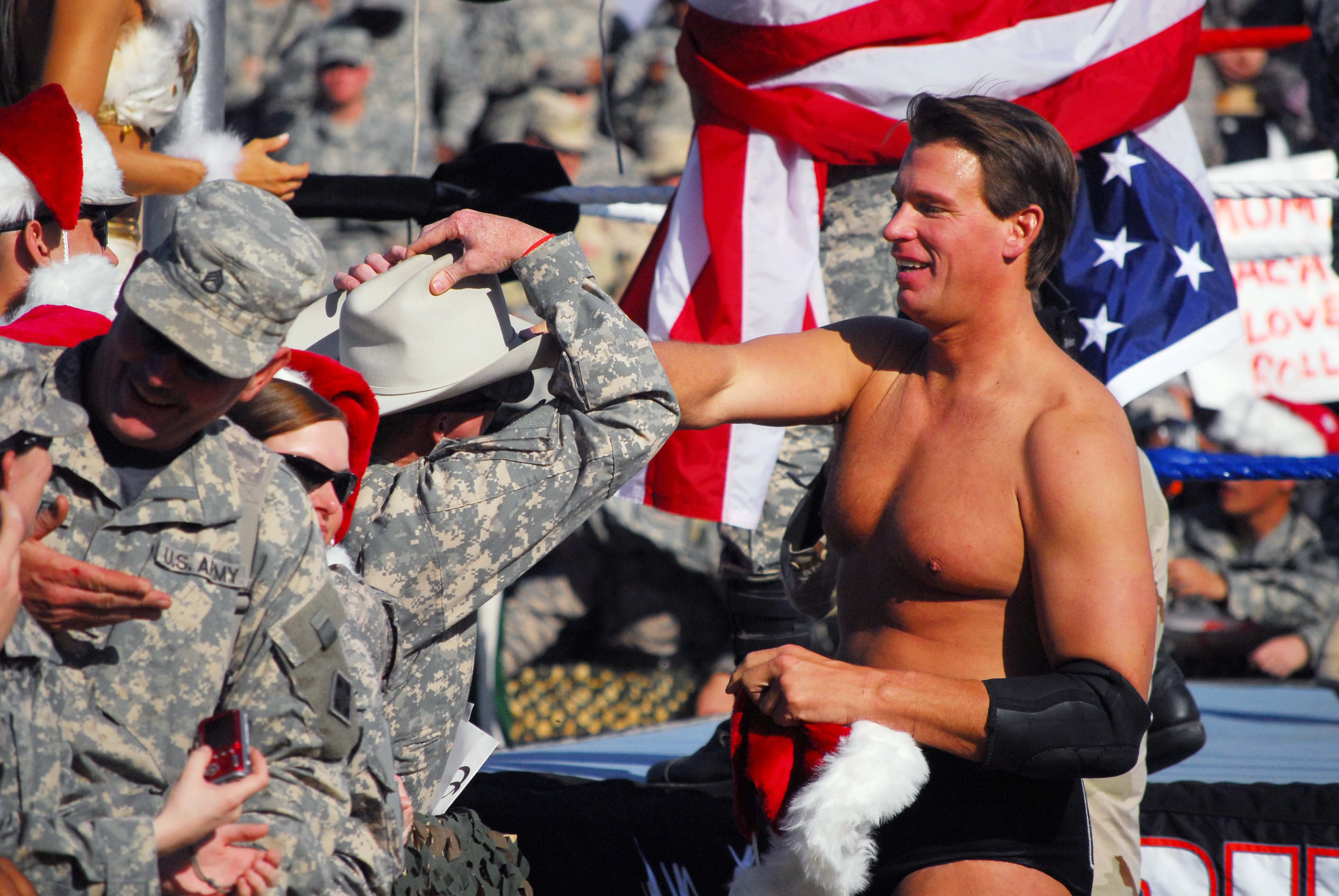
Layfield at Tribute to the Troops

On the September 16 episode of SmackDown!, JBL lost to Rey Mysterio. He hired Jillian Hall to "fix" his career. At No Mercy on October 9, JBL defeated Mysterio in a rematch. JBL started a feud with The Boogeyman who scared him many times. The two had a match at the Royal Rumble on January 29, 2006, which the Boogeyman won. His next opponent was Bobby Lashley, whom JBL defeated at No Way Out on February 19. On the February 24 episode of SmackDown!, he suffered a broken hand at the hands of Chris Benoit in a six-man tag team match, and WWE.com announced that he underwent successful surgery. JBL returned and feuded with Benoit, defeating him for his United States Championship at WrestleMania 22 on April 2. During this time, Jillian Hall remained at the side of JBL until the April 21 episode of SmackDown! when JBL fired Hall, due to a mistake she made during a steel cage rematch between JBL and Benoit the week before as well as her lack of putting together an "appropriate" celebration for him.

JBL, while still United States Champion, challenged for the World Heavyweight Championship. JBL tried to weaken then champion Rey Mysterio in the weeks leading up to his title match as Mysterio faced off against any opponent of JBL's choosing, capitalizing on Mysterio claiming that he was "a man of his word," and would take on anyone. Mysterio was defeated by Mark Henry and squashed by The Great Khali in non-title singles matches before facing Raw's Kane in a match, that went to a no-contest. This was leading to their title match at Judgment Day on May 21, which Mysterio won and retained the title by pinning JBL after a frog splash. On the May 26 episode of SmackDown!, Mysterio turned the tables on JBL, making him take on Bobby Lashley with the United States Championship on the line, and JBL lost the title. Infuriated, JBL went to SmackDown! general manager Theodore Long, telling Long that he wanted a rematch with Mysterio for the World Heavyweight Championship and that if JBL lost, he would quit. When he lost, the crowd at the arena began to sing "Na Na, Hey Hey, Goodbye". JBL later stated that he did not have a formal contract with Long going into the match and that he did not intend to leave SmackDown!. This angle was used to give JBL time off wrestling due to his serious back injury.

==== Commentator and part-time wrestler (2006–2008) ====
At ECW One Night Stand on June 11, JBL announced that he would take Tazz's place as the new color commentator for SmackDown!. He made his debut as a color commentator on the June 16 episode of SmackDown!. JBL noted in a commentary on TheStreet.com that he was retiring from in-ring competition for good. In his final column on the website, JBL wrote, "I have also come to believe that you can't fight father time. A broken back suffered in a match in England, compounded by a herniated and bulged disc, finally made me realize my career as a professional wrestler was over. I since migrated to the color commentary position much in the way that Jesse Ventura did before me."

JBL returned to the ring on November 13 in the main event of a WWE house show in Dublin, Ireland. JBL teamed with Mr. Kennedy and King Booker against The Brothers of Destruction (Kane and The Undertaker), and Batista. On the December 22 episode of SmackDown!, JBL cut a promo berating Theodore Long and cursing out the fans for cheering during the Inferno match at Armageddon on December 17 ("Rome didn't fall because of the gladiators in the ring. Rome fell because of the spectators in the stands.")

On the October 12, 2007, episode of SmackDown!, JBL was announced as one of the options WWE fans would be able to vote for to be the special guest referee at Cyber Sunday on October 28 for the World Heavyweight Championship match between Batista and The Undertaker, but he lost the vote to Stone Cold Steve Austin. At Cyber Sunday, he issued a heated altercation towards those running alongside him, ultimately receiving a Stone Cold Stunner from Austin. After this, he became physical as a color commentator, attacking both Batista and The Undertaker in the middle of a match as revenge after he was speared by Batista and later chokeslammed by The Undertaker after taunting them consecutively, in events leading up to Cyber Sunday. He justified these actions by explaining, "I am retired, not dead" (and that he [Layfield] should be respected).

At Armageddon on December 16, JBL was present at the SmackDown! announcer's table during the WWE Championship match. During this match, Randy Orton whipped a charging Chris Jericho over the announcer table where JBL was situated, and in the heat of the match, Jericho "pushed" JBL out of the way. Minutes later, an infuriated JBL kicked Jericho in the head, leading to a disqualification victory for Jericho meaning that Orton retained the title.

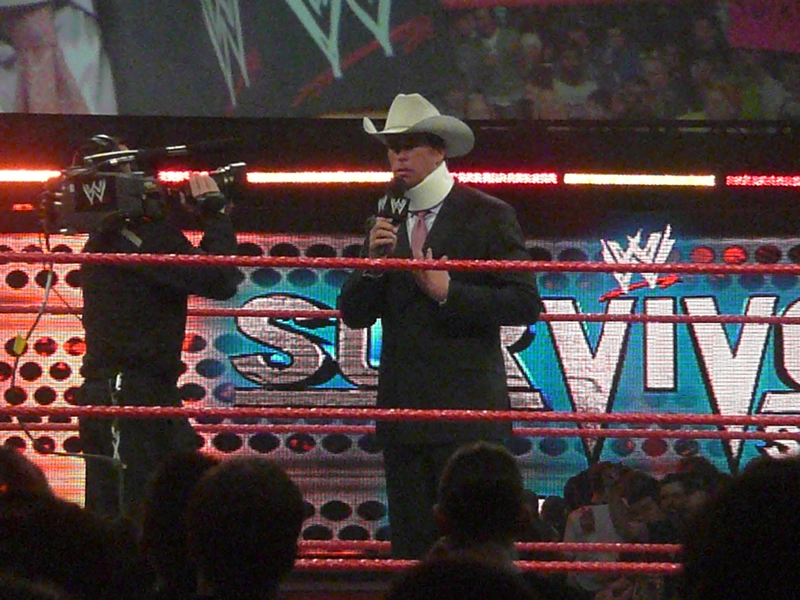
Layfield on Raw in 2008

On the December 17 episode of Raw, JBL announced that he would resume his wrestling career in response to a challenge made by Jericho. On the December 21 episode of SmackDown!, JBL gave his farewell address from SmackDown!, officially marking his return to Raw on December 31. Jericho was disqualified in their match at the Royal Rumble on January 27, 2008, after hitting JBL with a chair. The duo battled in a rematch on the February 11 episode of Raw, which Jericho won.

On February 18 on Raw, JBL interfered in the scheduled steel cage match between Mr. McMahon and his storyline illegitimate son, Hornswoggle. After Vince whipped Hornswoggle with his belt, JBL attacked Finlay from behind and handcuffed him to the top rope. After Mr. McMahon left the ring, JBL proceeded to beat Hornswoggle throwing him against the sides of the cage. JBL later revealed to McMahon that Hornswoggle was Finlay's storyline son, not McMahon's. On March 29, JBL inducted the Brisco Brothers into the WWE Hall of Fame. On March 30, JBL defeated Finlay in a Belfast Brawl at WrestleMania XXIV.

JBL's first championship bid since returning to the ring came by challenging Randy Orton for the WWE Championship and participating in a Fatal Four-Way Elimination match at Backlash on April 27 that also included John Cena and Triple H. JBL was eliminated first in the match by tapping out to Cena's STFU, thus renewing their feud from 2005. Cena defeated JBL at Judgment Day on May 18 and then at One Night Stand on June 1 in a First Blood match. He managed to defeat Cena in a New York City Parking Lot Brawl at The Great American Bash on July 20.

==== Intercontinental Champion and retirement (2008–2009) ====
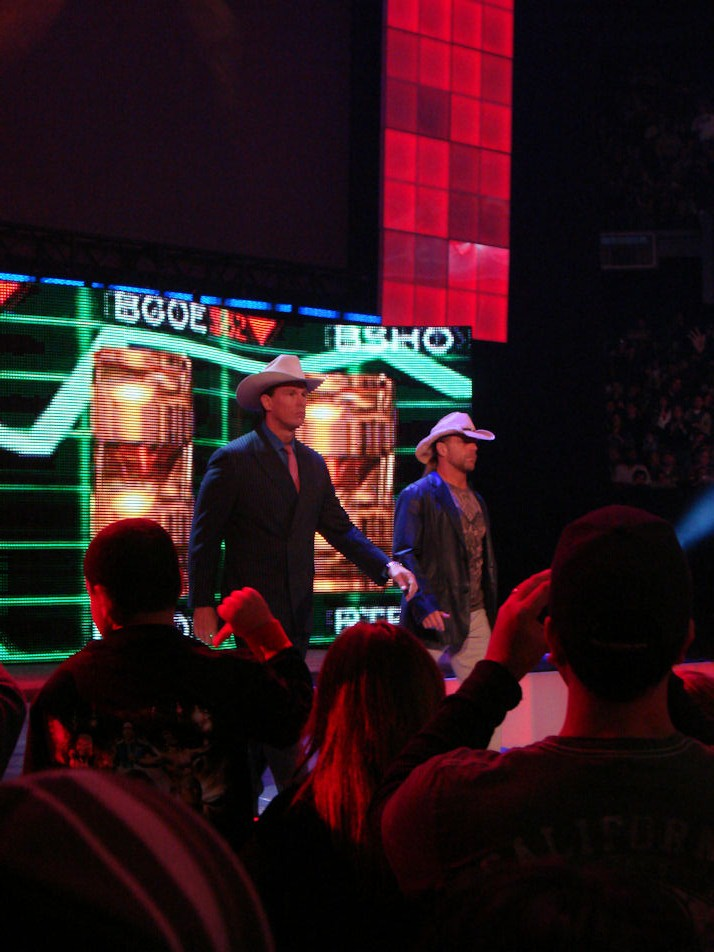
Shawn Michaels and Layfield

JBL's next on-screen rivalry was with CM Punk, the reigning World Heavyweight Champion. During the feud, JBL insulted Punk's straight-edge lifestyle, calling it "boring." On the August 11 edition of Raw, JBL challenged Punk to a contest he claimed that Punk would not be able to win, which was revealed to be an alcohol drinking contest where he challenged Punk to drink a shot of Jack Daniel's whiskey to prove that he would do anything to remain champion. Punk refused, not wanting to risk compromising his beliefs, before throwing the drink in JBL's face. JBL faced Punk for the World Heavyweight Championship at SummerSlam on August 17, which he would lose after Punk hit him with his finishing move, the Go 2 Sleep. On September 7 at Unforgiven, JBL faced Batista, Kane, Rey Mysterio and Chris Jericho (who replaced Punk in the match after he was attacked by Randy Orton) in a Championship Scramble match for the World Heavyweight Championship. Jericho went on to win the match and the World Heavyweight Championship. At No Mercy on October 5, JBL was defeated by Batista in a No. 1 Contender's match for the World Heavyweight Championship.

Throughout late 2008 and early 2009, JBL had a short rivalry with Shawn Michaels. At Survivor Series on November 23, JBL's team faced Michaels' team in a five on five tag team elimination tag team match in which Michaels' team emerged victorious. Michaels had lost his family's personal savings due to the 2008 financial crisis and would later become JBL's employee at Armageddon on December 14. After failing to secure JBL for the World Heavyweight Championship against John Cena at the Royal Rumble on January 25, 2009, Michaels agreed to take part in an "All or Nothing" match at No Way Out on February 15. Michaels won the match at No Way Out, after his wife (who was watching in the audience) punched JBL in the face and Michaels planted the Sweet Chin Music. This ended any employment links between the two with Michaels still receiving the full payment owed to him and end the feud.

On the March 9 episode of Raw, JBL defeated CM Punk to win the Intercontinental Championship, thus becoming the 10th Grand Slam Champion and 20th Triple Crown Champion. He held the title for one month, losing the Intercontinental title at WrestleMania 25 on April 5 against Rey Mysterio in 21 seconds. After the match, he grabbed a microphone and said "I quit!"; the next day he announced his retirement on his WWE Universe blog.

==== Return to commentating (2011–2017) ====
Layfield made his return to WWE on the March 7, 2011, episode of Raw as Michael Cole's choice for special guest referee for his match against Jerry Lawler at WrestleMania XXVII on April 3. He cut a promo claiming he was starting his "journey back to the main event at WrestleMania," before being interrupted by Stone Cold Steve Austin just as he was about to sign the contract. After a brief argument between the two, Austin hit Layfield with the Stone Cold Stunner and signed the contract to be the special guest referee.

On March 31, 2012, Layfield inducted his former tag team partner and real life best friend Ron Simmons into the 2012 WWE Hall of Fame. On July 23 Layfield returned with Simmons at Raw 1000 as the APA, after being called for protection by Lita. After a Clothesline from Hell, Lita defeated Heath Slater, thus turning face for the first time since 2004.

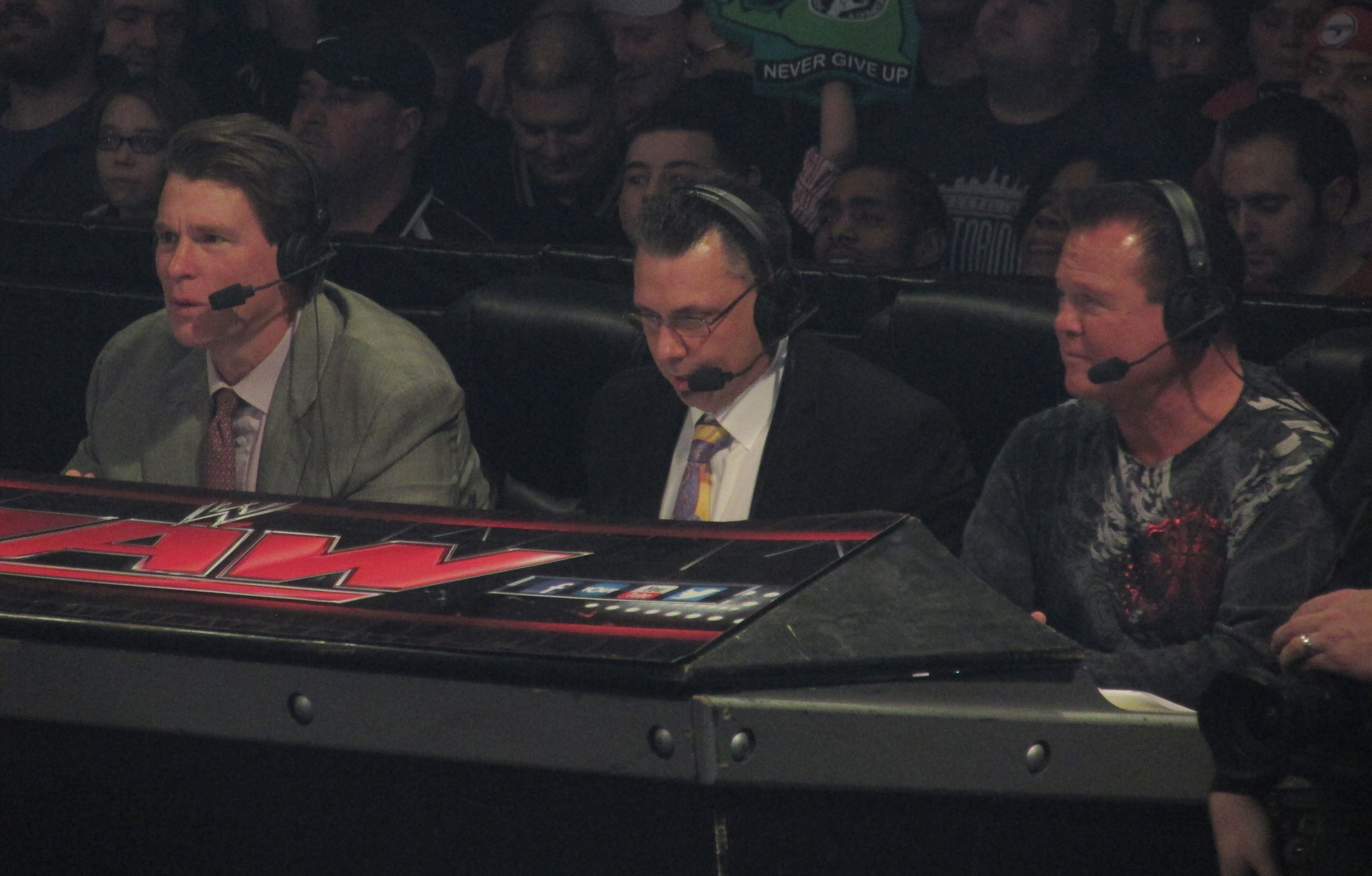
Layfield (left) commentating on Raw with Michael Cole (center) and Jerry Lawler (right) in 2014

Starting at Night of Champions on September 16, Layfield returned to his JBL persona, and sporadically filled in as color commentator, replacing Jerry Lawler, who suffered a legitimate heart attack during the Raw episode preceding Night of Champions. Layfield later re-signed with WWE and returned to the SmackDown broadcast team on a full-time basis, alongside Josh Mathews and eventually Michael Cole. On April 1, 2013, JBL became the third commentator for Raw alongside Michael Cole and Jerry Lawler. JBL was also part of the commentary team at WWE pay-per-views and commentated at WrestleMania 29 on April 7. On September 12, JBL was named commissioner of NXT, replacing Dusty Rhodes. On January 26, 2014, at the Royal Rumble, JBL wrestled in his first WWE match in nearly five years as a surprise entrant in the Royal Rumble match. Having been on commentary the whole broadcast, JBL left the commentator's table when his number (#24) came up. However, JBL was quickly eliminated by Roman Reigns while trying to hand his jacket to Michael Cole and resumed his role as commentator for the rest of the broadcast. In July, JBL was retired as NXT general manager and succeeded by William Regal. On the January 19, 2015, episode of Raw, JBL, along with Ron Simmons (a fellow member of The Acolytes Protection Agency), the New World Order and The New Age Outlaws attacked The Ascension and then, JBL would perform a Clothesline from Hell on Viktor. On the March 30 episode of Raw, JBL, along with Booker T and Michael Cole, were injured by Brock Lesnar after Seth Rollins refused Lesnar his WWE World Heavyweight Championship rematch.

Following the 2016 WWE draft on July 19, WWE announced on their website that JBL would move to the SmackDown commentary team, joining Mauro Ranallo and David Otunga. Layfield returned to his alma mater, Abilene Christian University, a color commentator for two radio broadcasts as the ACU football team faced Houston Baptist University and Stephen F. Austin State University in September 2016. He made his first appearance on the American Sports Network on October 1, 2016, when ACU hosted the University of Central Arkansas. On the January 17 episode of SmackDown Live, JBL saved Jerry Lawler, after Lawler's interview with Dolph Ziggler, who took credit for Lawler's real-life heart attack in September 2012, before Ziggler viciously kicked Lawler's chest and left the ring.

==== Sporadic appearances and WWE Hall of Famer (2017–present) ====
On September 1, 2017, JBL announced that he was stepping away from the SmackDown Live commentary team to focus on humanitarian work in and out of WWE, mainly as a Beyond Sport Global Ambassador. The APA made an appearance at the Raw 25 Years show on January 22, 2018, playing poker with other legends and superstars. Layfield occasionally works on commentary during the Tribute to the Troops events with the latest one occurred on December 4, 2018 (aired on December 20) in Fort Hood.

On March 3, 2020, during WWE Backstage it was officially announced that JBL would be inducted into the WWE Hall of Fame as part of WrestleMania 36 week however the event was postponed due to the COVID-19 pandemic. On November 22, 2020, he made an appearance at Survivor Series during The Undertaker's retirement ceremony. During WrestleMania 37 week, JBL was inducted into the WWE Hall of Fame class of 2020 during the 2021 ceremony following the delay the previous year, he was later a panelist on the WrestleMania 37 kick-off show, and provided commentary in the singles match between Kevin Owens and Sami Zayn.

From October 2022 until February 2023, Layfield worked as the manager of Baron Corbin.

On the November 21, 2023, episode of NXT, JBL announced who will be in the qualifiers for the Iron Survivor Challenge at NXT Deadline.

On December 8, 2023, JBL served as a guest commentator for the 21st annual Tribute to the Troops episode on SmackDown.

On the January 20, 2025, episode of Raw, JBL served as the guest commentator for the match between Rey Mysterio and Kofi Kingston.

=== Non-WWE appearances and Lucha Libre AAA Worldwide (2024–present) ===
Layfield, in his first non-WWE appearance since 1995, as John Layfield, accompanied Nic Nemeth (formerly Dolph Ziggler) to the ring at Lucha Libre AAA Worldwide's Triplemanía XXXII: Mexico City event on August 17, 2024, to defend the AAA Mega Championship, in which Nemeth lost to Alberto El Patrón. During the following weeks, Layfield also appeared at Game Changer Wrestling's Homecoming and Dream On Total Nonstop Action Wrestling's Emergence, Bound for Glory and Genesis, Major League Wrestling's Fightland, and Juggalo Championship Wrestling's Devil's Night.

Beginning in January 2026, Layfield, along with Rey Mysterio, serves as an English color commentator for WWE's sister promotion, Lucha Libre AAA Worldwide, joining Corey Graves as play-by-play commentator

On June 11, 2026, Layfield would return to the ring at OVW 1400 with Cash Flow in a Tornado Tag Team match against Kash Daniel and Dustin Jackson.

== Business career ==
WWE describes Layfield as a "self-made" millionaire. In 2003, Layfield published a book on financial management titled Have More Money Now. He and his wife, then Oppenheimer Holdings' financial analyst Meredith Whitney, were featured in the August 2008 issue of Fortune magazine.

Layfield is the founder of Layfield Energy. In 2008, Layfield Energy launched a drink called MamaJuana Energy. In March 2009, Layfield Energy became the main sponsor and advertiser of Ohio Valley Wrestling, a former WWE developmental promotion based in Louisville, Kentucky.

Layfield has lived full-time in Bermuda since shortly after his retirement from in-ring activity. Feeling confined living in New York City, he spent the summer of 2009 in Bermuda at his wife's encouragement, and the couple soon bought a full-time home there. As he acclimated to Bermuda, he noticed what he called "the almost predominant black-on-black violence that is unfortunately pervasive throughout the local neighborhoods", and in 2011 created the nonprofit organization Beyond Rugby Bermuda, using rugby union to provide young people with an alternative to gangs. The organization is an offshoot of Beyond Sport, a South African nonprofit that uses running for similar purposes; Layfield was introduced to that group's founder when he and his wife visited the country for the 2010 FIFA World Cup. He spends much of his time outside of WWE with the organization, filling duties as varied as celebrity fundraising and mowing the rugby field. Beyond Rugby Bermuda began with six boys; as of February 2017, more than 400 boys and girls were involved. Layfield is now a global ambassador for Beyond Sport alongside figures such as Tony Blair and Desmond Tutu.

In the spring of 2018, Major League Rugby announced that they would start an expansion team in New York City. In this announcement, it was announced that the co-founders of the Rugby New York club would be James Kennedy and Layfield.

== Cable news ==
In 2004, Layfield was hired by CNBC to be a contributor. During a WWE house show in Munich, Germany, early in June 2004, in an attempt to draw heel heat, he gave the crowd several Nazi salutes while goose-stepping around the ring. Such a display is illegal in Germany, and CNBC fired Layfield as a result of the controversy. In an interview with The Washington Post, Layfield explained "I'm a bad guy [on WWE TV]. I'm supposed to incite the crowd. I've done it for decades. I really didn't think anything of [the Nazi salute] – I know how bad it is, I've lived [in Germany]. I've been to Dachau, seen those places where they exterminated millions of Jews. I draw the line between me and my character. That's like saying Anthony Hopkins (who portrays Hannibal Lecter) really enjoys cannibalism."

Layfield left CNBC and was subsequently hired by Fox News and sister network (and CNBC rival) Fox Business as a business commentator.

== Other media ==
In April 2009, following his departure from WWE, Ohio Valley Wrestling owner Danny Davis announced in a press release that Layfield would be color commentator and host for Vyper Fight League, which Layfield would also sponsor with Layfield Energy; however, the company folded the following year.

In November 2012, Layfield started hosting a new show on WWE's YouTube channel alongside Michael Cole and Renee Young called The JBL and Renee Show (formerly known as The JBL Show and The JBL and Cole Show). The series ended in May 2015.

Layfield used to run the website Layfield Report which highlighted a variety of his views and opinions in numerous articles. The site was ended in September 2014.

Layfield has appeared as a playable character in a number of WWE video games. His first appearance as a playable character was in WWF Attitude, as well as being a playable character, in WWF WrestleMania 2000, WWF SmackDown!, WWF No Mercy, WWF SmackDown! 2: Know Your Role, WWF SmackDown! Just Bring It, WWF Road to WrestleMania, WWF Raw, WWE WrestleMania X8, WWE SmackDown! Shut Your Mouth, WWE Crush Hour, WWE Raw 2, WWE SmackDown! vs. Raw, WWE WrestleMania 21, WWE Day of Reckoning 2, WWE SmackDown! vs. Raw 2006, WWE SmackDown vs. Raw 2007, WWE SmackDown vs. Raw 2008, WWE SmackDown vs. Raw 2009, WWE SmackDown vs. Raw 2010, WWE '13, WWE 2K14, WWE 2K15 as DLC, WWE 2K16, WWE 2K17, WWE 2K18, WWE 2K22, WWE 2K23, WWE 2K24, WWE 2K25 and WWE 2K26. Layfield also appears as a commentator for several games, including WWE SmackDown vs Raw 2008, WWE 2K16 and WWE 2K17.

Layfield began broadcasting American football games in 2016, serving as analyst for a pair of Abilene Christian University radio broadcasts and two Southland Conference games televised on American Sports Network. His ASN debut pitted the University of Central Arkansas against Abilene Christian, followed by ACU's matchup at McNeese State University.

In 2021, Layfield began hosting a podcast series with Gerald Brisco.

=== Filmography ===
Year	Title	Role	Notes	Ref.
2012–2015	The JBL and Renee Show	Himself	Web series; main role	
2015–2017	Legends with JBL	Himself (host)	WWE Network series	

== Personal life ==
His parents are Lavelle Layfield, who is a minister, and Mary Layfield.

Layfield married his second wife, Meredith Whitney, on February 11, 2005, in Key West, Florida. He was previously married to Cindy Womack on June 6, 1994, but divorced in 2003.

=== Bullying allegations and hazing ===
Sports Illustrated has said that Layfield "has been accused for years of being a locker room bully," while Deadspin wrote that "backstage tales of Layfield's hazing and bullying have long been legend among hardcore wrestling fans." Dayton Daily News described that "YouTube has dozens of interviews where former performers discuss harassment, bullying and taking real blows from Layfield while wrestling him in supposedly choreographed matches." Le Journal de Montréal listed Mark Henry, Matt Hardy, René Duprée, Daivari, and Ivory, among others, as wrestlers who in interviews described Layfield as a bully. In 2010, The Miz referenced Layfield in an onscreen promo about hazing he faced in the locker room early in his career. Layfield admitted to hazing Miz and said that he did not regret doing so.

In April 2017, WWE commentator Mauro Ranallo took an absence from WWE, which Dave Meltzer reported had been triggered by hostilities with Layfield. The allegations coincided with the release of former WWE ring announcer Justin Roberts' autobiography, in which he alleged that Layfield stole his passport. Layfield denied that he himself stole the passport, but John Morrison subsequently claimed that Layfield encouraged him and Joey Mercury to steal Roberts' passport, which they did not agree to. Angered WWE fans subsequently called on WWE to fire Layfield. On April 22, Newsweek reported that Ranallo and WWE "mutually agreed to part ways," and Ranallo released a statement in which he said his departure had "nothing to do with JBL." Layfield released a statement of his own, stating: "Admittedly, I took part in locker room pranks that existed within the industry years ago. WWE addressed my behavior and I responded accordingly, yet my past is being brought up because of recent unfounded rumors. I apologize if anything I said playing 'the bad guy' on a TV show was misconstrued."

== Championships and accomplishments ==
Layfield is a former WWE Champion

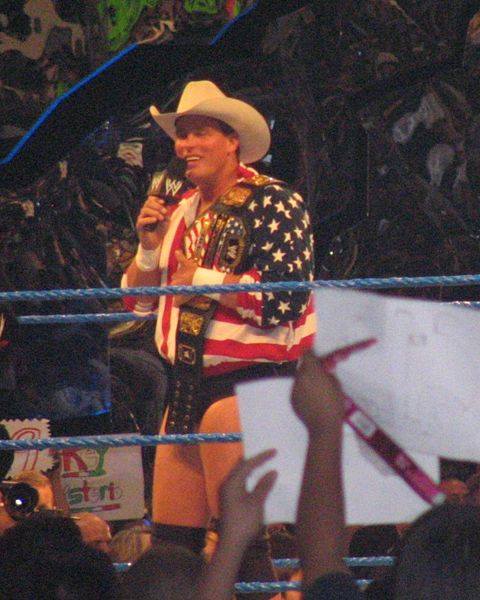
Layfield is a former United States Champion

=== College football ===
- Abilene Christian University
  - 1989 NCAA Division II All–American

=== Professional wrestling ===
- Catch Wrestling Association
  - CWA World Tag Team Championship (1 time) – with Cannonball Grizzly
- Cauliflower Alley Club
  - Iron Mike Mazurki Award (2022)
- Federacion Internacional de Lucha Libre
  - FILL Heavyweight Championship (1 time)
- George Tragos/Lou Thesz Professional Wrestling Hall of Fame
  - Lou Thesz Award (2012)
- Global Wrestling Federation
  - GWF Tag Team Championship (2 times) – with Bobby Duncum Jr. (1) and Black Bart (1)
- Memphis Championship Wrestling
  - MCW Southern Tag Team Championship (1 time) – with Faarooq
- NWA Dallas
  - NWA North American Heavyweight Championship (1 time)
- Ohio Valley Wrestling
  - OVW Southern Tag Team Championship (1 time) – with Ron Simmons
- Pro Wrestling Illustrated
  - Ranked No. 5 of the 500 best singles wrestlers in the PWI 500 in 2005
  - Ranked No. 496 of the best 500 singles wrestlers of all time in the PWI Years in 2003
- United States Wrestling Federation
  - USWF Tag Team Championship (1 time) – with The Equalizer
- WrestleCade Entertainment
  - Top Rope Belts Battle Royale (2025)
- World Wrestling Federation / World Wrestling Entertainment / WWE
  - WWE Championship (1 time)
  - WWE Intercontinental Championship (1 time)
  - WWE United States Championship (1 time)
  - WWE Hardcore Championship (17 times)
  - WWF European Championship (1 time)
  - WWF Tag Team Championship (3 times) – with Faarooq
  - WWE Championship No. 1 Contender's Tournament (April 2005)
  - Race to the Rumble Tournament (2009)
  - Slammy Award (1 time)
    - Favorite Web Show of the Year (2013) – with Michael Cole and Renee Young for The JBL and Cole Show
  - 20th Triple Crown Champion
  - 10th Grand Slam Champion
  - WWE Hall of Fame (Class of 2020)
  - APA Invitational (2003) - with Faarooq
- Wrestling Observer Newsletter
  - Best Gimmick (2004)
  - Worst Television Announcer (2014, 2015)
  - Worst Worked Match of the Year (2002) with Trish Stratus vs. Christopher Nowinski and Jackie Gayda on Raw, July 7
  - Most Disgusting Promotional Tactic (2014) Insulting fans who purchased PPV

== See also ==
- List of gridiron football players who became professional wrestlers
