= WWE WrestleMania X8 (video game) =

2002 video game

- The NTSC cover art featuring Rob Van Dam, Stone Cold Steve Austin and "Hollywood" Hulk Hogan
- Developer: Yuke's
- Publishers: WW: THQ; JP: Yuke's
- Director: Hirofumi Morino
- Designers: Takumi Kon; Shinya Masuda; Shunsuke Katsumata
- Artist: Brian Wanamaker
- Composers: Tomoyuki Hamada; Satoshi Miyashita; Akira Yasumichi; Tenyuu Nakamura
- Platform: GameCube
- Release: NA: June 10, 2002; JP: September 6, 2002; EU: September 27, 2002; AU: October 9, 2002
- Genre: Sports
- Modes: Single-player, multiplayer

WWE WrestleMania X8 is a professional wrestling video game developed by Yuke's and published exclusively to the GameCube by THQ on June 10, 2002. The game is named after the WrestleMania X8 pay-per-view event that was held at the Skydome in Toronto, Canada on March 17, 2002.

The game was originally going to be called WWF WrestleMania X8, however the WWF became WWE on May 6, 2002, as a result of an on-going trademark dispute with the World Wide Fund for Nature. Whilst the external packaging labels this as a "WWE" release, its gameplay and inner contents fully retain all "WWF" logos and references.

== Gameplay ==
WWE WrestleMania X8 features a simple grappling system. Each wrestler has five front grapples, five rear grapples, and miscellaneous grapples, such as an evade and grapple in which a wrestler will dodge and then perform a hold or throw. There are meters based on color for the competitors in a match, and a pin is possible when the player's meter is fully red and their opponent's is fully blue. A large portion of the gameplay revolves around counter moves, with different buttons countering different maneuvers and allow different responses, such as strike and grapple. The game features a wide selection of signature moves used by wrestlers, and all wrestlers in the game have their unique entrances. There are a variety of weapons available, as well as the ability to perform a number of different grapples with them.

The game features a variety of match types, including Standard, Hardcore, Table, Ladder, TLC, Battle Royal, Steel Cage, Hell in a Cell, and Ironman. The number of participants in the match can also be chosen, including a singles match, a tag team match, a handicap match, Triple Threat, Fatal Four-Way, Battle Royal, and Royal Rumble. The Hell in a Cell match features the ability to utilize unique grapples on the walls of the cell, as well as the ability to climb to the roof of the cell and fight atop it, with the option of throwing an opponent through the roof to the mat below.

The game marks the WWE video game debuts of former WCW and ECW wrestlers signed during the Invasion storyline such as Booker T, Rob Van Dam, The Hurricane, and Lance Storm (Diamond Dallas Page, another major figure in the WCW/ECW Alliance and the WWF European Champion entering the namesake pay-per-view, was not included in the game). It was also the first appearance of Hulk Hogan and Ric Flair on a WWF/WWE video game since the 16-bit WWF Royal Rumble game (Hogan was on the Genesis version, while Flair was on the SNES version), as well as the only appearance for Scott Hall as an active WWE wrestler under the nWo gimmick, as he was released from the company prior to the game's release and was thus removed from WWE SmackDown! Shut Your Mouth. In addition, the game features "Rollin'" as The Undertaker's entrance theme music although Fred Durst was not included in the game in contrast to the previous WWF games that featured the song, while some former WCW wrestlers (including the nWo and Booker T) and The Hardy Boyz do not have their proper entrance music.

=== Modes ===
The game features a Path of a Champion mode, a single player mode in which a player can attempt a championship path and make an attempt to win it. The titles offered are the WWF Heavyweight Championship, WWF Intercontinental Championship, WWF European Championship, WWF Light Heavyweight Championship, WWF Hardcore Championship and WWF World Tag Team Championship. There are four difficulties in which to play the mode, and there are a variety of unlockables for winning championships with particular wrestlers.

Another mode in the game is the Battle for the Belts mode, in which a player can go after one of 51 fictional belts, some of which actually resemble real title belts from other promotions, such as the XPW World Heavyweight Championship, the IWGP Heavyweight Championship, the WCW Hardcore Championship, the NWA Worlds Heavyweight Championship, and the AWA World Heavyweight Championship (circa 1970's). Battle for the Belts even has the WWF Women's Championship, as well as the Smoking Skull and Brahma Bull Championships (the latter of which was never actually seen on WWF programming). A player can challenge either the CPU controlled wrestler who holds the belt or another player who has the belt in an attempt to win it. A player can customize the belt by naming it and changing its color. The game also features a Create-A-Wrestler mode in which a wrestler can be created with customized appearance, moves, profile, and a wide variety of other options.

== Development ==
WWE WrestleMania X8 was Yuke's first WWE game on a Nintendo platform, replacing AKI Corporation as the developer for these systems; some former AKI developers were hired by Yuke's to develop a game with gameplay style closer to their titles rather than Yuke's own SmackDown series on PlayStation, while taking advantage of GameCube's graphical capabilities compared to Nintendo 64.

Stone Cold Steve Austin was replaced with The Rock on the cover for the PAL version, and later NTSC releases, due to Austin's walkout following the game's release.

The game had a marketing budget of $3 million.

== Reception ==
Reception

Aggregate score
Aggregator	Score
Metacritic	64/100

Review scores
Publication	Score
Electronic Gaming Monthly	7.83/10
Famitsu	8/10, 8/10, 8/10, 8/10
Game Informer	6.5/10
GamePro	3/5
GameSpot	7.6/10
GameZone	6.1/10
IGN	7/10
NGC Magazine	70%
Nintendo Power	3.4/5
Nintendo World Report	(Powers) 6.5/10 (Orlando) 5.5/10

WWE WrestleMania X8 received "average" reviews according to video game review aggregator Metacritic.

== Sequel ==
The game was succeeded by WWE WrestleMania XIX for the GameCube in 2003.

== See also ==
- List of licensed wrestling video games
- List of fighting games
