= WWE WrestleMania XIX (video game) =

2003 video game

- NTSC cover art featuring Stone Cold Steve Austin, Kurt Angle and The Rock
- Developer: Yuke's
- Publishers: WW: THQ; JP: Yuke's
- Director: Hirofumi Morino
- Producer: Norifumi Hara
- Designers: Shunsuke Katsumata; Takumi Ken
- Programmers: Tatsuhiko Sugimoto; Takanori Morita
- Artists: Brian Wanamaker; Koji Ito
- Platform: GameCube
- Release: NA: September 8, 2003; EU: September 19, 2003; JP: November 7, 2003
- Genre: Sports
- Modes: Single-player, multiplayer

WWE WrestleMania XIX is a professional wrestling video game developed by Yuke's and released for the GameCube by THQ in 2003. Based on the professional wrestling promotion World Wrestling Entertainment (WWE), it is the sequel to WWE WrestleMania X8. The roster consists of around 69 WWE wrestlers between May 2002 and March 2003, as the WWE was beginning to shift its momentum from the Attitude Era into the Ruthless Aggression Era.

Unlike the previous game and other contemporary WWE games, WrestleMania XIX does not feature a conventional story/career mode in which players control a particular wrestler in a series of matches. Instead, the game features "Revenge Mode" a mission-based mode in which players try to achieve certain goals in various locations outside of the ring. Most of the background music of the game was also in the Xbox game WWE Raw 2 and the PlayStation 2 game WWE SmackDown! Here Comes the Pain.

== Revenge Mode ==
In Revenge Mode, players can select any superstar on the roster (except for Stephanie McMahon and Vince McMahon) or a created superstar. The story begins with the player being dragged out of an arena by security guards and literally tossed into the street. Later, the player encounters Stephanie McMahon. Stephanie notices that the player wants revenge on Vince McMahon for firing them, and the player and Stephanie devise a plan to ruin Vince's flagship pay-per-view, WrestleMania. To do this, the player is sent to various locations and must combat workers and wrestlers hired as security (both authentic and created who are generated and unlocked randomly) they encounter in each location, with objectives such as disrupting a construction site, sinking a WWE owned shipment barge, and destroying a mall that was set up for fan festivities.

After the player completes objectives in the perimeter areas, they fight Vince at WrestleMania XIX in a match. If the player wins, Stephanie appears to congratulate the player but immediately regrets the deal, getting speared by Goldberg.

== Reception ==
=== Critic reviews ===
Reception

Aggregate score
| Aggregator | Score |
|---|---|
| Metacritic | 76/100 |

Review scores
| Publication | Score |
|---|---|
| Electronic Gaming Monthly | 7.17/10 |
| Game Informer | 7.75/10 |
| GamePro | 4/5 |
| GameSpot | 7.5/10 |
| GameSpy | 3/5 |
| GameZone | 7.8/10 |
| IGN | 8/10 |
| Nintendo Power | 4/5 |
| Nintendo World Report | 8/10 |
| X-Play | 3/5 |

The game received "generally favorable reviews" according to video game review aggregator Metacritic.

=== Accolades ===
| Distributor: | Category: | Result: |
|---|---|---|
| 2003 Spike Video Game Awards | Best Fighting Game | Nominated |

== Sequel ==
WrestleMania XIX was succeeded by WWE Day of Reckoning in 2004.
