= WWE Tagged Classics =

Professional wrestling direct-to-video series

Cover art of the first Tagged Classics set released in 2004, featuring WrestleMania 1 and 2.

WWE Tagged Classics is a series of two-disc DVD sets produced by former WWE video distributor Silver Vision for retail markets in Region 2 in PAL format. The majority of sets feature a WWF pay-per-view event from one year on one disc, with another disc that featured the same event from the following year, or two consecutive pay-per-view events.

The first Tagged Classics DVD set released was WrestleMania 1 and 2 in 2004 and the last to be released was UK Fan Favourites 1993 & 1995 in 2012.

== History ==
The sets are composed of two WWF events each, which were previously released on VHS. They contain no extras beyond the events (unless an extra was included in the original VHS release of the event, i.e. the original WrestleMania XIV DVD release includes a post-match press conference with Stone Cold Steve Austin and Mike Tyson) up until the release of King of the Ring 1999 & 2000, in which the King of the Ring 2000 disc contained the same extras that the original VHS release did.

Most of the sets in the series are simply re-releases of commercial WWF video tapes; however, they are taken from master WWE source tapes of these releases. The same edits on the ex-WWF tapes (as different from the live broadcast PPV version of the event) are present on these sets. The series includes events such as Royal Rumble, WrestleMania, King of the Ring, SummerSlam and Survivor Series, as well as In Your House pay-per-views that began in 1995. There have also been releases of other shows such as One Night Only and UK Rampage 1991 as well as other original VHS titles.

A limited amount of Tagged Classics were released in the United States, spanning the years 2003-2005 and in Canada; 2002-2005, these sets were not produced by Silver Vision. They included present WWE PPVs 'tagged' together. For example, Royal Rumble and No Way Out 2003.

The Tagged Classics series was discontinued when Silver Vision lost its WWE license at the end of 2012.

== Usage of "WWF" initials and music rights ==
A screenshot from a Tagged Classics release showing the uncensored WWF "scratch" logo.

In August 2001, the World Wrestling Federation (WWF) lost a British High Court trademark dispute made by the World Wide Fund for Nature (WWF), which concerned usage of the "WWF" trademark. In May 2002, the Federation renamed itself to World Wrestling Entertainment (WWE), and ceased use of the "WWF" initials. In April 2003, the Fund lost their British lawsuit trying to prevent WWE from re-releasing legacy video games that still showed “WWF” references in-game. The court ruled censoring these references would be impractical, noting packaging had already been updated to “WWE", and the Fund failed to prove any brand damage. As a consequence, the Tagged Classics DVDs follow the April 2003 ruling, with all "WWF" references preserved in the footage prior to the WWE name change. Only the external packaging and menu screens of the Tagged Classics DVDs display the "WWE" initials. Notably, all WWE Home Video releases emanating from the United States were more cautious and continued to censor "WWF" references, despite the April 2003 British court ruling.

As the Tagged Classics DVDs did not censor the "WWF" initials, they could reuse the original VHS masters, in which also allowed them to use the same music licenses that were granted to the original VHS releases. Notably, WWE DVD re-issues from the United States have been known to alter some music due to licensing issues, such as on the WrestleMania: The Complete Anthology DVD box set, where Demolition's entrance theme is dubbed over with generic production music.

== List of WWE Tagged Classics ==
Below is the complete list of all 84 WWE Tagged Classics released by Silver Vision between 2004 and 2012. The sets are ordered by their release date:

- WrestleMania 1 and 2
- Royal Rumble 1989 & 1990
- WrestleMania 3 and 4
- King of the Ring '93 and '94
- SummerSlam 1988 and 1989
- Royal Rumble 1991 and 1992
- Battle Royal at The Albert Hall · UK Rampage '91
- Survivor Series 1987 and 1988
- In Your House 1 and 2
- Fab Four · One Night Only
- In Your House 13 and 16
- WrestleMania 5 and 6
- King of the Ring '95 and '96
- Royal Rumble 1993 and 1994
- Survivor Series 1989 and 1990
- WrestleMania VII and VIII
- SummerSlam 1990 and 1991
- SummerSlam 1992 and 1993
- Survivor Series 1991 and 1992
- WrestleMania IX and X
- Royal Rumble 1995 and 1996
- King of the Ring 1997 and 1998
- SummerSlam 1994 and 1995
- WrestleMania XI and XII
- Survivor Series 1993 and 1994
- SummerSlam 1996 and 1997
- Survivor Series 1995 and 1996
- Royal Rumble 1997 and 1998
- In Your House 3 and 4
- WrestleMania 13 and XIV
- In Your House 5 and 6
- King of the Ring 1999 & 2000
- In Your House 7 & 8
- SummerSlam 1998 & 1999
- In Your House 9 & 10
- In Your House 14 & 15
- In Your House 11 & 12
- Survivor Series 1997 & 1998
- Royal Rumble 1999 & 2000
- In Your House 17 & 18
- In Your House 19 & 20
- In Your House 21 & 22
- In Your House 23 & 24
- In Your House 25 & 26
- In Your House 27 & 28
- Fully Loaded 1999 & Unforgiven 1999
- No Mercy 1999 & Armageddon 1999
- WrestleMania 2000
- Survivor Series 1999 & Survivor Series 2000
- No Way Out 2000 & Backlash 2000
- Judgment Day 2000 & Fully Loaded 2000
- Royal Rumble 2001 & Royal Rumble 2002
- SummerSlam 2000 & SummerSlam 2001
- Unforgiven 2000 & No Mercy 2000
- Armageddon 2000 & No Way Out 2001
- WrestleMania X-Seven
- Backlash 2001 & Judgment Day 2001
- King of the Ring 2001 & Invasion 2001
- Unforgiven 2001 & No Mercy 2001
- Survivor Series 2001 & Vengeance 2001
- No Way Out 2002 & Backlash 2002
- WrestleMania 15 & Hell Yeah
- WrestleMania X8
- Capital Carnage 1998 & No Mercy 1999
- nWo Back in Black & Big Daddy Cool Diesel & Oozing Machismo Razor Ramon
- Best of Raw Vol. 1 & 2
- Rebellion 2000 & Insurrextion 2001
- WrestleFest 1988 & WrestleFest 1990
- Rebellion 1999 & Insurrextion 2000
- Rebellion 2001 & Insurrextion 2002
- The Year in Review 1993 & 1994
- The Year in Review: 1995 & 1996
- Shawn Michaels Hits from The Heartbreak Kid & Shawn Michaels Heartbreak Express Tour
- U.S. Rampage '91 & '92
- The Rock The People's Champ & The Rock Just Bring It
- Triple H: The Game & That Damn Good
- UK Rampage '92 & '93
- Undertaker: This Is My Yard & Mick Foley: Hard Knocks & Cheap Pops
- Brawl in the Family & Wrestling Grudge Matches
- Hardy Boyz: Leap of Faith & Lita: It Just Feels Right
- Action! & Hardcore
- Austin 3:16: Uncensored · Three Faces of Foley · Chris Jericho: Break Down The Walls · Kurt Angle: It's True, It's True
- Best of Raw: Volumes 1 & 2 (July to October 1996)
- UK Fan Favourites 1993 & 1995
