= WWF trademark dispute =

The WWF trademark dispute was a legal event where the World Wide Fund for Nature (WWF) filed a lawsuit against the World Wrestling Federation (WWF) over the violation of a prior international agreement regarding usage of the "WWF" initials. The Fund had used the "WWF" initialism 18 years prior to the Federation's use.

On April 17, 2000, the Fund commenced proceedings in the High Court of Justice in England against the Federation, citing breaches of their 1994 international agreement, as the Fund was based in Switzerland, and the Federation was based in the United States. The High Court ruled in favor of the Fund on August 10, 2001, and the Court of Appeal upheld their ruling on February 27, 2002. On May 6, 2002, the Federation, despite having an active petition for appeal at the House of Lords, announced their name change to World Wrestling Entertainment (WWE).

On May 16, 2002, WWE chairman Vince McMahon appeared on TSN's Off the Record with Michael Landsberg, stating that wrestling's international expansion in the 1990s, as well as the advent of the Internet, had created unforeseen challenges when the Federation and the Fund initially agreed on the use of the "WWF" initials in 1989.

== The case ==
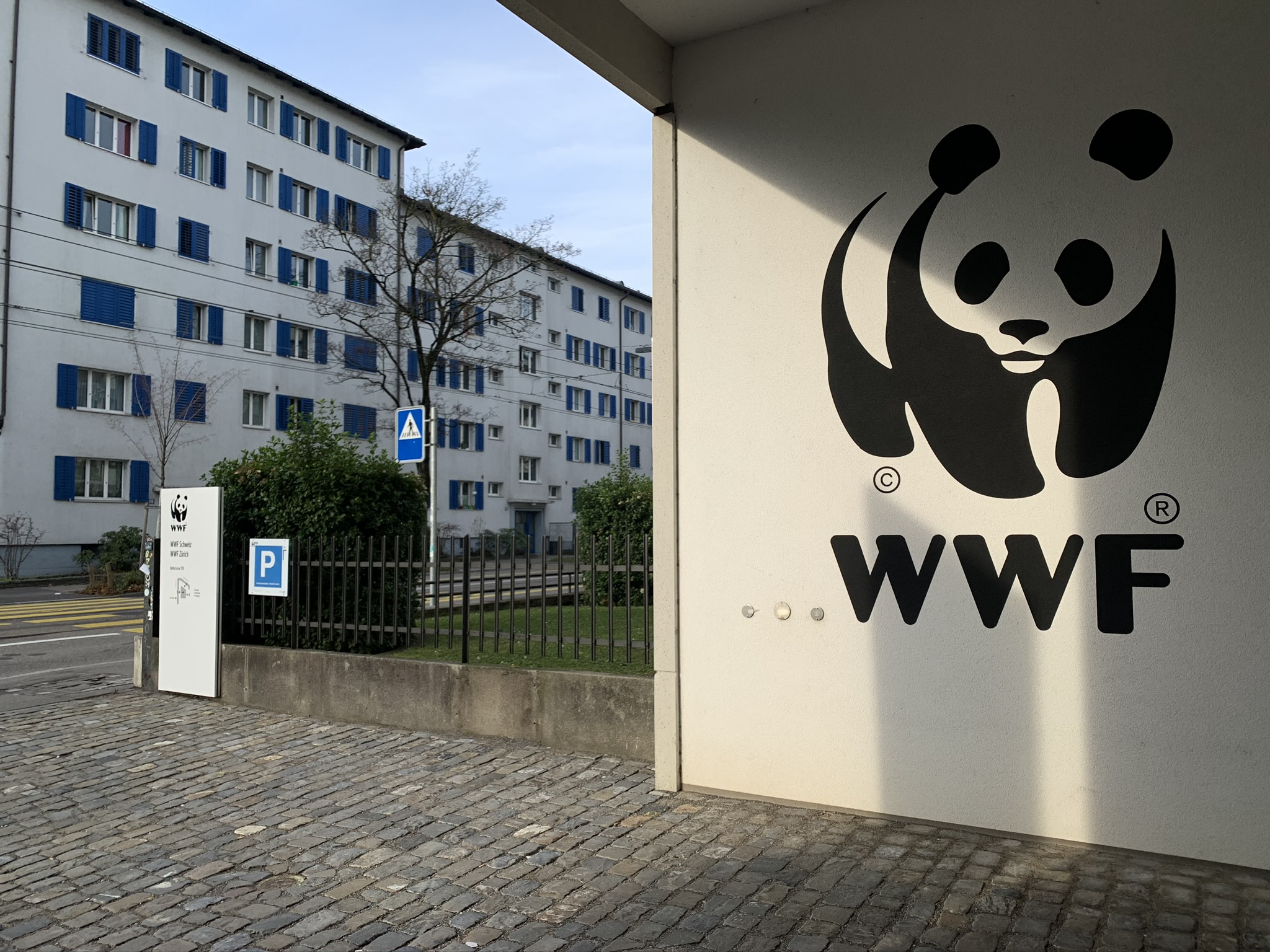
The World Wide Fund for Nature's offices in Zurich, pictured in January 2020. Despite changing its name outside of North America from "World Wildlife Fund" in 1989, the Fund maintain usage of the "WWF" initials.

=== Background ===
The World Wildlife Fund registered the "WWF" initials as a trademark in 1961. Despite changing its name internationally to the World Wide Fund for Nature in 1989, the Fund retained use of the "WWF" initials globally as its logo and in-print, and still referred to itself as the World Wildlife Fund (WWF) in the United States and Canada.

Originally founded as the Capitol Wrestling Corporation (CWC) in 1953, the wrestling promotion changed its name in 1963 to the World Wide Wrestling Federation (WWWF). In 1979, the WWWF rebranded as the World Wrestling Federation (WWF). Initially, the Federation conducted operations only within the United States, and did not venture internationally.

=== Initial 1989 agreement ===
On September 6, 1989, the Fund had filed for extensions of time to oppose a trademark application by the Federation for "WWF", on the grounds of potential confusion with their own registered "WWF" trademark.

On September 12, 1989, the Federation sent a letter to the Fund addressing its federal trademark application for the "WWF" mark in International Class 41 (for wrestling entertainment services). The International Class 41 also includes education, which the Fund were registered in. This marked the beginning of formal discussions between the two parties regarding the use of the "WWF" initials.

On September 26, 1989, both parties reached an agreement that the Federation would not use the "WWF" initials in the Times Roman typeface when the initials appeared alone, without the Federation's logo. In exchange, the Fund agreed not to oppose the Federation's federal trademark registration for "WWF" in Class 41.

=== International dispute and subsequent 1994 agreement ===
By 1993, despite the 1989 agreement, both parties had been involved in further disputes, as the Federation had grown in popularity across Europe. Both the Fund and Federation had contested international trademark applications the other party had made. The Fund obtained an interim injunction against the distributor of the Federation's WWF Magazine in Switzerland, citing trademark infringements.

The WWF "block" logo used by the Federation from 1982 to 1997. This logo was seen to be more readable as "WF", rather than "WWF", so was permitted in the 1994 agreement with the Fund.

On January 20, 1994, the Fund and the Federation formed a new agreement, including that the Federation would stop using the "WWF" initials in printed, written, or visual form in connection with its business, though allowances were made for pre-approved merchandise and publications. The Federation was also prohibited from filing any new trademarks with the "WWF" initials and had to cancel existing registrations, except for those associated with the Federation's WWF “block" logo. The WWF "block" logo was a highly stylised version of the "WWF" initialism, appearing to look more like "WF". The Federation was allowed to occasionally use the initials in verbal contexts, such as referring to the “WWF champion", but was otherwise expected to avoid using them. Other terms included that business partners were required to exclusively refer to the company as the "World Wrestling Federation".

=== Federation's 1997 website and logo violations ===
In September 1996, the Federation registered WWF.com, later launching their website in the summer of 1997. While the website used "World Wrestling Federation" in its title, the use of "WWF" in the domain name was problematic with the Fund. In November 1997, as part of a corporate rebranding strategy, the Federation introduced a new logo at their Survivor Series pay-per-view event, informally referred to as the "scratch" logo. As this logo represented the W's in a different format to that of the previous "block" logo, the Fund felt it more clearly represented the "WWF" initials instead of "WF".

As a result of the previous actions, legal friction between the two entities continued, including various cease and desist letters being sent from the Fund to the Federation and its business partners in the late 1990s. In May 1999, a variation of the WWF "scratch" logo was used for a British Sky Box Office promotional advertisement relating to the WWF No Mercy live pay-per-view event from the Manchester Evening News Arena, splitting the "WW" from the "F" entirely.

The WWF "scratch" logo that was introduced at Survivor Series 1997, without permission of the Fund. This logo was found in court to have violated the 1994 agreement, as the court ruled it displayed itself more as "WWF", than "WF". In May 2002, WWE modified the logo to remove the "F" and just display as "WW".

=== 2001 High Court of Justice ruling ===
On April 17, 2000, the Fund commenced proceedings against the Federation at the High Court of Justice in England, claiming that the Federation had violated the 1994 agreement, particularly with their use of the WWF "scratch" logo, the WWF.com website domain, and other Internet-based endeavors using "WWF". The Federation counterargued that their agreement did not foresee the Internet, and therefore was restrictive and a restraint of trade, and also argued that the "WWF" scratch logo was still more readable as "WF".

On August 10, 2001, the court ruled in favor of the Fund, agreeing that the WWF.com web domain and WWF "scratch" logo had both violated prior intellectual property agreements between the Fund and the Federation. The court found that the Federation had failed to comply with the 1994 agreement since at least 1997. The Federation filed against the decision in England's Court of Appeal on October 1, 2001.

=== 2002 Court of Appeal ruling ===
On February 27, 2002, the Court of Appeal dismissed the Federation's challenge to the High Court of Justice's decision. However, the Federation was granted a stay by the Court of Appeal, this meaning the ruling in August 2001 could be put on hold to allow time for the Federation to seek other appeal options. The Federation announced on the same day that it would petition the House of Lords for an appeal.

“I like WWF. That's who we were, and we were WWWF at one time. But, it was one of those things whereby -- and I haven't conceded defeat yet because it's still under appeal. But, it was a way in which we could move on very quickly with who we are and be done with it. I mean, we've been battling these guys for such a long time and, who knows? Maybe we'll ultimately win. I hope so, but nevertheless we had to move on.”

—Vince McMahon on Byte This!, 7 June 2002

On May 6, 2002, the Federation issued a statement, announcing that it would rebrand from World Wrestling Federation (WWF) to World Wrestling Entertainment (WWE). In the same statement, Linda McMahon, CEO for WWE, said that the rebranding allowed for the company to emphasize its focus on entertainment, and the company also launched its "Get the F Out!" marketing campaign. The former WWF "scratch" logo was amended to omit the "F" (displaying as just "WW"). On 7 June Vince McMahon appeared on WWF web show Byte This!, on which he stated his preference for the WWF name but desire to move on from the situation. On June 10, 2002, the House of Lords officially refused WWE's appeal petition.

From this point, aspects of the 1994 agreement would still be upheld, including the ability for WWE to still be able to use the original WWF "block" logo, and the "World Wrestling Federation" term. However, WWE would be prohibited from using the "WWF" initials, as well as the WWF "scratch" logo introduced at Survivor Series 1997. To prevent further legal disputes, in most cases, WWE censored archival footage by muting spoken references of the "WWF" initials, censoring the former WWF "scratch" logo and any "WWF" typefaces.

“If the Federation wanted to develop a worldwide trade, whether through the Internet or any other means, the letters WWF were a very risky base on which to build it. When it established its website, it was, or should have been, fully aware of that fact. The costs of ‘rebranding’ now, after some five years of development, are entirely attributable to its own decision to take that risk. The scratch logo may be less significant in itself, but it was part of the same strategy. It was likewise a clear breach of the agreement, and the risks were apparent.”

—Excerpt of the ruling

== Subsequent legal proceedings ==
=== 2003 Court of Appeal interactive software ruling ===
On June 10, 2002, THQ and Jakks Pacific released the video game WWE WrestleMania X8 for the Nintendo GameCube. Although the game's title and external packaging featured "WWE" branding, its gameplay featured "WWF" references, as development had been completed prior to the name change. From August 9, 2002, THQ and Jakks Pacific re-released WWF SmackDown! 2: Know Your Role and WWF SmackDown! Just Bring It under various budget labels for the PlayStation and PlayStation 2 consoles. From September 27, 2002, THQ and Jakks Pacific also re-released WWF Raw for Xbox and Microsoft Windows. Whilst these legacy titles were completely unchanged from their original releases (retaining all "WWF" references in their internal content), their external packaging was amended to fully display the "WWE" logo and typefaces.

On November 10, 2002, the Fund secured an injunction from the High Court, preventing WWE, THQ, and Jakks Pacific from distributing any legacy interactive software titles that failed to censor "WWF" references in the gameplay. On April 7, 2003, a three-judge panel in the Court of Appeal overturned the injunction. The court ruled in favor of WWE, THQ and Jakks Pacific, agreeing that modifying the games to censor "WWF" references would be impractical due to the configuration of the software. Additionally, the court noted that the Fund failed to prove any actual harm caused by the releases, especially given that all external packaging at consumer-level had already been updated to reflect the WWE branding. The court ordered the Fund to cover $100,000 in legal costs for WWE, THQ, and Jakks Pacific.

=== 2007 High Court of Justice's damages claim ruling ===
On October 29, 2004, the Fund served a pleading described as "Claim for Damages". On March 23, 2005, Mr Justice Patten gave the Fund permission to amend paragraph 8 of their claim to seek for damages. On February 16, 2006, the Fund sought damages against the WWE in the High Court over the entire dispute. On April 2, 2007, the High Court ruled in favor of WWE. The court found that the Fund's approach constituted an abuse of process due to inconsistent legal strategies and delays in seeking damages. Specifically, the court noted that the Fund had previously sought an injunction without pursuing damages and only later amended their claim to include a financial remedy. This shift was seen as procedurally improper.

Furthermore, the court addressed the Fund's attempt to claim damages based on the "Wrotham Park" principle, which allows for compensation reflecting a hypothetical license fee the defendant would have paid for the unauthorized use. The court concluded that such damages were not appropriate in this case, as the Fund could not demonstrate a direct financial loss from WWE's actions.

== Other events ==
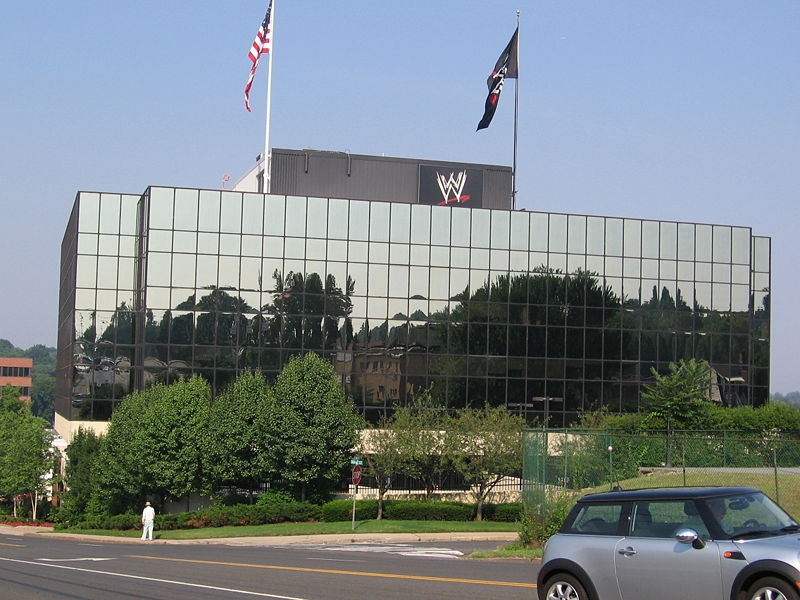
WWE's headquarters in Stamford, Connecticut, pictured in July 2007. Signage displays the amended logo introduced in May 2002, that replaced the former WWF "scratch" logo.

=== Use of "WWF" after the ruling ===
From May 5, 2002, WWF.com acted as a redirect, sending visitors to WWE.com. The scheduled DVD and VHS releases of "WWF" events (such as Backlash and Insurrextion) were issued as-is with "WWF" references fully retained within the footage, but with "WWE" logos on the exterior packaging and used in marketing materials.

The WWF Tough Enough 2 compilation CD released by Geffen Records on May 14, 2002, while having the new "WWE" logo on the cover, was issued as a "WWF" release on the CD spine as it had already been cataloged by Geffen. The New York Stock Exchange ticker symbol remained as "NYSE:WWF" until August 7, 2002, and some championship titles on WWE programming continued to feature the WWF "scratch" logo on them, until they could be redesigned.

Due to WWE's April 2003 victory in the Court of Appeal, the British WWE Tagged Classics DVD re-issues of WWF VHS releases, issued between 2004 and 2012 by third-party distributor Silver Vision, feature pre-2002 content in its uncut, original, uncensored form—fully retaining all references to "WWF". However, exactly as the same as the re-released interactive software, the external packaging at retail strictly uses "WWE" branding.

Throughout the 2000s, the original "WWF" block logo remained used on licensed replica WWE championship titles that were manufactured and sold by Figures Toy Company, as well as occasionally on other forms of merchandise. On November 15, 2010, WWE Raw hosted an "Old School" edition which featured the WWF "block" logo frequently in the program, alongside a range of WWF "block" logo merchandise that was sold at the event and online. However, the event's overhead banners and the ring aprons used "World Wrestling Entertainment". In other instances, such as on John Cena's vintage-themed 2003 "Word Life" merchandise, WWE modified the block logo to remove the "F" entirely.

The compilation music albums WWF Aggression, WWF Forceable Entry, WWF Tough Enough (Music from the Hit Series) and WWF Tough Enough 2 remain listed on digital music stores and music streaming services as legacy "WWF" releases, as they are distributed by record labels such as Sony Music and Universal Music Group, therefore are not controlled by WWE.

=== WWF.com domain lapse ===
On December 1, 2002, the WWF.com web domain name expired. WWE had allowed the domain name to lapse, as there was no legal obligation to transfer the asset to the Fund. The domain was quickly acquired by Frank Baach, who sold it to Gregory Ricks from Texas in 2003, who used the domain for his "Web Wrestling Forum". On November 17, 2006, it was announced that the Fund's attempt to obtain the domain name through ICANN's UDRP system, on the grounds that it was registered in bad faith, was unsuccessful, as Ricks was using the web domain for professional wrestling forum purposes and therefore did not pretend to be affiliated with the Fund.

=== 2012 agreement for archival footage ===
Ahead of the launch of the WWE Network online streaming service, the Fund reached a new agreement with the WWE that would no longer require the promotion to censor WWF "scratch" logos, "WWF" typefaces, or spoken "WWF" references in legacy footage. However, this new agreement would override the 1994 agreement, meaning that WWE would no longer be allowed to reproduce the original WWF "block" logo or the phrase "World Wrestling Federation". The WWE Raw 1000 television special, broadcast on July 23, 2012, included the first television broadcasts of uncensored "WWF" legacy footage.
