= Silver Vision =

British video production and distribution label

Silver Vision (UK) Limited
- Type: Subsidiary
- Industry: Video production Distribution label
- Genre: Professional wrestling
- Founded: 7 July 1990; 36 years ago
- Defunct: 29 July 2014; 12 years ago
- Fate: Dissolved
- Headquarters: The Lighthouse, 1 Aden Road, Enfield, London, England
- Area served: United Kingdom; Europe
- Parent: Clear Vision Limited

Silver Vision Limited was a British video production and distribution label, and a subsidiary of Clear Vision Limited. The company was based in Enfield, London, England. The company is most famous for being the official home video distributor for WWE in Europe from 7 July 1990 to 31 December 2012.

== History ==
In 2004, Silver Vision launched the WWE Tagged Classics DVD range, with each release typically compiling two reissued WWF VHS releases from the 1980s to early 2000s. These releases took advantage of an April 2003 British court ruling, enabling WWE to use the former "WWF" initials in legacy footage, following a prior loss in the WWF trademark dispute.

On 19 September 2012, Silver Vision announced on their website that the partnership between their parent Clear Vision Ltd. and WWE would end on 31 December 2012, with SummerSlam 2012 and nWo: The Revolution being the label's final WWE release. Silver Vision announced they would continue to release WWE DVDs while supplies last. On 19 November 2012, it was announced that FremantleMedia (now Fremantle) would be the new WWE Home Video distributor for the United Kingdom and the rest of Europe. Silver Vision's website sold their last WWE DVDs by June 2013 and after that date, the brand officially was dissolved, with their website redirecting to their parent company Clear Vision afterwards.

In January 2013, Queensway Digital, Clear Vision's parent company, announced they had secured the deal to release Total Nonstop Action Wrestling (TNA) DVDs after losing their WWE license. In December 2013, the company entered administration. On 29 July 2014, the company went under a voluntary strike-off.

The company continued to release film DVDs and sell depleted WWE stock until 2017, when its online store went offline, with its domain soon lapsing.

== Home media ==
Silver Vision released roughly 100 to 200 DVDs in 14 years from 7 July 2000 to 29 July 2014, which are: 1: documentaries about the WWE wrestlers, 2: two ECW documentaries and two PPVs, 3: all of the WWE exclusives and WWE Tagged Classics series.

=== Region 2 DVDs ===
==== Silver Vision Documentaries Exclusive Releases ====
Region 2
DVD Title	Aspect Ratio	Total running time	Release Date
The Rock: The People’s Champ (1 DISC SET)	16:9	143 mins.	April 25, 2000
The Rock: Just Bring It (2 DISC SET)	16:9	255 mins.	October 1, 2002
SILVER VISION PRESENTS Mick Foley: Greatest Hits & Misses - A Life In Wrestling (2 DVD SET)	16:9	389 mins.	January 1, 2008
SILVER VISION - BREAKING THE CODE: BEHIND THE WALLS OF CHRIS JERICHO (3 DVD SET)	16:9	8hrs 52 mins.	November 22, 2010
SILVER VISION PRESENTS THE JOHN CENA EXPERIENCE (3 DVD SET) (Note: There is a FREMANTLE MEDIA ENTERPRISES Edition of the Same DVD as well)	16:9	7hrs 15mins.	January 24, 2011
Shawn Michaels: Heartbreak Kid & Heartbreak Express	16:9	N/A	Jul 11, 2011
Triple H: The Game & That Damn Good	16:9	N/A	Oct 17, 2011
Undertaker: This Is My Yard & Mick Foley: Hard Knocks & Cheap Pops	16:9	N/A	Jan 16, 2012
Hardy Boyz: Leap of Faith & Lita: It Just Feels Right	16:9	N/A	Mar 19, 2012
The Rock: The Epic Journey Of Dwayne The Rock Johnson (3 DVD SET)	16:9	6hrs 54 mins.	April 23, 2012
Austin 3:16 Uncensored, Three Faces of Foley, Chris Jericho: Break Down the Walls & Kurt Angle: Its True, Its True	16:9	252 Minutes	Sep 17, 2012

==== Silver Vision ECW Exclusive Releases ====
Region 2
DVD Title	Aspect Ratio	Total running time	Release Date
SILVER VISION PRESENTS: The RISE + FALL OF ECW (2 DISC DVD)	16:9	366 mins. AKA 6 hours and 5 mins	January 24, 2005
ECW: The Mist Extreme Matches (Double DVD)	16:9	350 mins. AKA 5 hours and 50 Minutes	March 20, 2006
ECW: ONE NIGHT STAND & ECW BARELY LEGAL (2 DISC SET)	16:9	350 mins. AKA 5 hours and 50 Minutes	June 11, 2006

==== WWE DVDs & WWE Tagged Classics Main Series ====
Region 2
DVD Title	Aspect Ratio	Total running time	Release Date
WrestleMania I & II	16:9	232 mins	May 10, 2004
Royal Rumble 1989 & 1990	16:9	283 mins	May 10, 2004
WrestleMania III & IV	16:9	N/A	Jun 7, 2004
King of the Ring 93 & 94	16:9	N/A	Jul 5, 2004
SummerSlam 88 & 89	16:9	N/A	Aug 9, 2004
Royal Rumble 91 & 92	16:9	N/A	Sep 6, 2004
UK Rampage 91 & Battle Royal in the Albert Hall	16:9	N/A	Oct 4, 2004
Survivor Series 87 & 88	16:9	N/A	Nov 1, 2004
In Your House 1 & 2	16:9	N/A	Jan 10, 2005
One Night Only & Fab Four	16:9	N/A	Feb 7, 2005
In Your House 13 & 16	16:9	N/A	Mar 7, 2005
WrestleMania V & VI	16:9	N/A	Apr 4, 2005
SummerSlam 90 & 91	16:9	N/A	May 1, 2005
King of the Ring 95 & 96	16:9	N/A	May 2, 2005
Royal Rumble 93 & 94	16:9	N/A	Jun 6, 2005
Survivor Series 89 & 90	16:9	N/A	Jul 4, 2005
WrestleMania VII & VIII	16:9	N/A	Sep 5, 2005
SummerSlam 92 & 93	16:9	N/A	Oct 3, 2005
Survivor Series 95 & 96	16:9	N/A	Nov 6, 2005
Survivor Series 91 & 92	16:9	N/A	Nov 7, 2005
Royal Rumble 95 & 96	16:9	N/A	Apr 17, 2006
WrestleMania IX & X	16:9	N/A	May 8, 2006
King of the Ring 97 & 98	16:9	N/A	Jun 5, 2006
SummerSlam 94 & 95	16:9	N/A	Jul 3, 2006
WrestleMania XI & XII	16:9	N/A	Aug 7, 2006
Survivor Series 93 & 94	16:9	N/A	Sep 4, 2006
SummerSlam 96 & 97	16:9	N/A	Oct 2, 2006
Royal Rumble 97 & 98	16:9	N/A	Jan 8, 2007
In Your House 3 & 4	16:9	N/A	Feb 5, 2007
WrestleMania XII & XIV	16:9	N/A	Mar 5, 2007
WrestleMania XII & XIV	16:9	N/A	Mar 5, 2007
In Your House 5 & 6	16:9	N/A	Apr 2, 2007
King of the Ring 99 & 00	16:9	N/A	May 21, 2007
In Your House 7 & 8	16:9	N/A	June 4, 2007
In Your House 9 & 10	16:9	N/A	Aug 6, 2007
SummerSlam 1998 & 1999	16:9	5hrs 58 mins	Aug 20, 2007
In Your House 11 & 12	16:9	N/A	Oct 1, 2007
Royal Rumble 99 & 00	16:9	N/A	Jan 1, 2008
Cyber Sunday 2006	16:9	N/A	Jan 1, 2008
Survivor Series 97 & 98	16:9	N/A	Jan 1, 2008
In Your House 14 & 15	16:9	N/A	Jan 7, 2008
Cyber Sunday 2007	16:9	N/A	Feb 18, 2008
In Your House 17 & 18	16:9	N/A	Mar 3, 2008
In Your House 19 & 20	16:9	N/A	Apr 7, 2008
In Your House 21 & 22	16:9	N/A	May 5, 2008
In Your House 23 & 24	16:9	N/A	Jun 2, 2008
In Your House 25 & 26	16:9	N/A	Jul 7, 2008
In Your House 27 & 28	16:9	N/A	Aug 4, 2008
WrestleMania XV & Hell Yeah	16:9	N/A	Sep 1, 2008
Fully Loaded & Unforgiven 99	16:9	N/A	Oct 16, 2008
No Mercy 1999 & Armageddon 1999 (2 DVD SET)	16:9	5hrs 33 mins	Nov 3, 2008
Survivor Series 99 & 00	16:9	N/A	Jan 19, 2009
Cyber Sunday 2008	16:9	N/A	Feb 25, 2009
WrestleMania 2000 (SPECIAL 2 DVD SET)	16:9	440 mins AKA 0VER 7 HOURS!	Mar 16, 2009
No Way Out 2000 & Backlash 2000 (2 DVD SET)	16:9	5hrs 42 Mins	Apr 13, 2009
Judgment Day & Fully Loaded 00	16:9	N/A	May 11, 2009
SummerSlam 00 & 01	16:9	N/A	Jun 8, 2009
Unforgiven & No Mercy 00	16:9	N/A	Jul 13, 2009
Royal Rumble 01 & 02	16:9	N/A	Aug 24, 2009
Armageddon 00 & No Way Out 01	16:9	N/A	Sep 14, 2009
WrestleMania X-Seven (2 DVD SET)	16:9	4hrs and 05 mins	Oct 12, 2009
Backlash & Judgment Day 01	16:9	N/A	Nov 9, 2009
King of the Ring & Invasion 01	16:9	N/A	Jan 18, 2010
Bragging Rights 2009 (UK Edition)	16:9	N/A	Feb 19, 2010
Unforgiven & No Mercy 01	16:9	N/A	Feb 22, 2010
Survivor Series & Vengeance 01	16:9	N/A	Apr 12, 2010
WrestleMania X8 (2 DVD SET)	16:9	3hrs and 41 mins	May 17, 2010
No Way Out & Backlash 02	16:9	N/A	Jun 14, 2010
WrestleMania XXVI	16:9	8hrs 7mins	July 5, 2010
Capital Carnage 98 & No Mercy 99	16:9	N/A	Jul 12, 2010
nWo: Back in Black, Diesel & Razor Ramon	16:9	N/A	Aug 9, 2010
Rebellion 99 & Insurrextion 00	16:9	N/A	Oct 11, 2010
Bragging Rights 2010 (UK Edition)	16:9	N/A	Oct 24, 2010
SUMMERSLAM 2010 (Steelbook Version)	16:9	2 hours and 57 minutes	November 15, 2010
NIGHT OF CHAMPIONS 2010	16:9	2 hours and 46 minutes	January 3, 2011
HELL IN A CELL 2010	16:9	2 hours and 49 minutes	January 11, 2011
Rebellion 00 & Insurrextion 01	16:9	N/A	Feb 21, 2011
Wrestlefest 88 & 90	16:9	N/A	Mar 21, 2011
Rebellion 01 & Insurrextion 02	16:9	N/A	Apr 18, 2011
Year in Review 93 & 94	16:9	N/A	May 16, 2011
US Rampage 91 & 92	16:9	N/A	Aug 29, 2011
Action & Hardcore	16:9	N/A	Sep 26, 2011
UK Rampage 92 & 93	16:9	N/A	Nov 14, 2011
Brawl in the Family & Wrestling Grudge Matches	16:9	N/A	Feb 13, 2012
WRESTLEMANIA XXVIII (3 DVD SET)	16:9	8hrs 18mins	July 30, 2012
1993 UK Fan Favourites/1995 UK Fan Favourites	16:9	4 hours and 19 minutes	12 Nov 2012

==== Silver Vision WWE Best Of and Live Exclusive DVD Releases ====
Region 2
DVD Title	Aspect Ratio	Total running time	Release Date
The Classic Five of 2001	16:9	N/A	Sep 9, 2002
The Classic Five of 2002/2003	16:9	N/A	Oct 6, 2003
Raw: Homecoming 2006	16:9	N/A	2006
Best of Raw & SmackDown Vol. 1 – SmackDown’s Most Memorable Matches	16:9	86 minutes	Apr 3, 2007
Best of Raw & SmackDown Vol. 2 – Raw’s Most Memorable Matches	16:9	86 minutes	2007
Best of Raw & SmackDown Vol. 3 – Cena vs. Edge	16:9	86 mins	2007
Best of Raw & SmackDown Vol. 4 – Return of Batista	16:9	N/A	Oct 8, 2007
Best of Raw & SmackDown Vol. 5 – Batista vs. Undertaker	16:9	N/A	2007
WWE Live in Italy	16:9	N/A	2007
Rey Mysterio: The Biggest Little Man (3 DISC SET)	16:9	8hrs 14mins	Nov 19, 2007
Live in the UK: October 2007	16:9	N/A	Feb 11, 2008
Live in the UK: April 2008	16:9	N/A	Sep 15, 2008
Live in the UK: November 2008	16:9	N/A	Feb 9, 2009
Live in the UK: April 2009	16:9	N/A	Jul 20, 2009
RAW: THE BEST OF 2009 (3 DVD SET)	16:9	8hrs and 39 minutes	April 19, 2010
Live in the UK: November 2009	16:9	N/A	May 3, 2010
Best of WWE Vol. 1 – Rey Mysterio	16:9	N/A	May 28, 2010
Best of WWE Vol. 2 – John Cena	16:9	88 mins	May 28, 2010
Best of WWE Vol. 3 – Batista	16:9	87 mins	May 28, 2010
Best of WWE Vol. 4 – Undertaker	16:9	N/A	May 28, 2010
Best of WWE Vol. 5 – Edge	16:9	N/A	May 28, 2010
Best of WWE Vol. 6 – New & Improved DX	16:9	N/A	May 28, 2010
Best of WWE Vol. 7 – Kane	16:9	N/A	May 28, 2010
Best of WWE Vol. 8 – Undertaker vs. Batista	16:9	N/A	May 28, 2010
Live in the UK: April 2010	16:9	N/A	Jul 18, 2010
BEST PAY-PER-VIEW MATCHES 2009-2010 (3 DVD SET)	16:9	6hrs 56mins	16 Aug. 2010
SMACKDOWN: THE BEST OF 2009-2010 (3 DVD SET)	16:9	7 Hours	January 10, 2011
WRESTLING'S HIGHEST FLYERS (3 DVD SET)	16:9	2 hours and 48 minutes	January 10, 2011
RAW: THE BEST OF 2010 (3 DVD SET)	16:9	7hrs 25mins	Mar 11, 2011
Live in the UK: November 2010	16:9	N/A	Mar 28, 2011
Live in the UK: April 2011	16:9	N/A	Jul 18, 2011
WWE Movie Triple Bill Boxset	16:9	N/A	Oct 3, 2011
WWE 2011 Annual	16:9	N/A	Oct 10, 2011
Live in the UK: November 2011	16:9	N/A	Feb 20, 2012
Live in the UK: April 2012	16:9	N/A	Aug 6, 2012
WWE 2012 Annual	16:9	N/A	Sep 24, 2012
Best of Raw Vol. 1 & 2	16:9	5 hours and 3 minutes	Oct 15, 2012
ROAD TO WRESTLEMANIA - OVER 10 HOURS OF EXPLOSIVE WWE ACTION (4 DVD SET) (WHICH INCLUDES ROYAL RUMBLE 2012 (25TH ANNIVERSARY), ELIMINATION CHAMBER 2012 & WRESTLEMANIA XXVIII AKA WRESTLEMANIA 28)	16:9	10 hrs 54 mins	Nov 5, 2012
