= WWE Raw 2 =

2003 video game

- NTSC cover art, featuring Triple H, Goldberg, and Scott Steiner.
- Developer: Anchor Inc.
- Publisher: THQ
- Director: Kentaro Arai
- Designer: Kentaro Arai
- Platform: Xbox
- Release: NA: September 15, 2003; AU: October 3, 2003; EU: October 10, 2003
- Genres: Sports
- Modes: Single-player, multiplayer

WWE Raw 2 is a professional wrestling video game released for the Xbox console by THQ in 2003, and developed by Tokyo-based company Anchor Inc. It is the sequel to the WWF Raw game that was released in 2002. WWE Raw 2 is the last Raw video game to be released on the Xbox and was succeeded by WWE WrestleMania 21.

== Gameplay ==
For the first time in the series, a season mode is included in the game. It allows players to set up wrestlers, call others out from the locker room, form alliances, and hire managers.

In Create a Superstar mode, users have the ability to choose their character's alignment type and whether he or she is to be a face or heel. The alignments determine who the character's friends and enemies are in the career mode.

Raw 2 also allows players to edit WWE's wrestlers into the way they want them to look similar to the N64 games WWF WrestleMania 2000 and WWF No Mercy. In season mode, alignment cannot be changed, but players can change who likes or dislikes their wrestler through various options. Changing between face and heel can also be done through the options.

The game features several arenas that WWE held events in during 2002 and 2003. There are also arenas based upon each WWE television show.

New match stipulations are included in the game: Hell in a Cell, TLC and Royal Rumble matches are available in Raw 2. The Create an Entrance feature allows the player to use custom music tracks that have been ripped onto their Xbox's hard disk (although this feature is inaccessible when playing the game on the Xbox 360), synchronize two sets of pyrotechnics with taunts or poses, and create an entrance video featuring the player's character performing various wrestling moves. Upon its release, the game was praised for an improved and more current roster. A select few of these abilities returned for WWE '12 and '13.

The game also features Raw and SmackDown referees in the game that the player can choose.

=== Rules ===
If the player is competing in a title match, the belt can be won via disqualification, going against the usual WWE rules. This means that if two superstars are competing for a championship and somebody interferes and causes a disqualification, the winner will become the champion. Divas are able to win heavyweight titles. This is a reflection of WWE programming in that Stephanie McMahon competed for the Undisputed WWF Championship in a triple threat match on Raw in 2002. In the Royal Rumble Match, the rule that a wrestler can exit the ring on their own terms and still not be eliminated, as was seen numerous times in the 2003 event, is recognised in the game. However, under rules that the Royal Rumble is over-the-top-rope, this would only be legal as long as they do not flip over, jump over or step over the top rope. The player would be eliminated if they stayed outside the ring for too long.

=== Season mode ===
To successfully complete a season, it is required to play through 12 months of Raw and SmackDown shows, as well as Pay-per-view events, and finish the season with either the WWE Championship, or the World Heavyweight Championship. Successful seasons earn points, which can be seen in the "Hall of Fame" section of the main menu of the game, which in turn unlocks items of clothing and entrance videos which can later be used in the creation or modification of characters. These items can also be unlocked using the "Steal" action during events in Season Mode. Unlike season modes from the SmackDown series, Raw 2 has no voice overs or text. The odds of receiving title shots, and of successfully completing the various available actions in season mode, are mostly based on the popularity of the character in use. Other factors, such as a character's level of friendliness towards other characters, such as Surprise Attacks, Encouragement, or the use of repetitive call-outs can also affect the odds.

== Reception ==
Reception

Aggregate score
Aggregator	Score
Metacritic	68/100

Review scores
Publication	Score
Electronic Gaming Monthly	4.33/10
Game Informer	7.25/10
GamePro	3/5
GameSpot	6.9/10
GameSpy	2/5
GameZone	8.9/10
IGN	9.1/10
Official Xbox Magazine (US)	6.8/10
TeamXbox	8.8/10
X-Play	3/5
Playboy	63%

The game received "average" reviews according to video game review aggregator Metacritic. Many praised the creation modes, but criticized the gameplay.

== See also ==
- List of professional wrestling video games
- List of fighting games
