= WWF SmackDown! Just Bring It =

2001 professional wrestling video game

- NTSC cover art featuring Spike Dudley, Kurt Angle, the Rock, and Triple H
- Developer: Yuke's
- Publishers: WW: THQ; JP: Yuke's
- Directors: Toshihiko Kitazawa; Taka Chihaya
- Producer: Norifumi Hara
- Designer: Toshihiko Kitazawa
- Programmers: Tokuichi Kitaguchi; Shintaro Matsubara
- Artist: Taka Chihaya
- Composer: Momo Michishita
- Series: SmackDown!
- Platform: PlayStation 2
- Release: EU: November 16, 2001; NA: November 19, 2001; JP: January 24, 2002
- Genre: Sports
- Modes: Single-player, multiplayer

WWF SmackDown! Just Bring It (known in Japan as Exciting Pro Wrestling 3 (エキサイティングプロレス3, Ekisaitingu Puro Resu 3) is a professional wrestling video game developed by Yuke's, and published by THQ for PlayStation 2, and was released in Europe on November 16, 2001, North America on November 19, 2001, and Japan on January 24, 2002.

It is the third game in the WWF SmackDown! series, based on the World Wrestling Federation (WWF) professional wrestling promotion, the sequel to WWF SmackDown! 2: Know Your Role, the first game in the series to be released on the PlayStation 2 console, the last game in the series to be released under the "WWF" initialism and during the Attitude Era, and one of the only games released for sixth-generation consoles under said initialism.

The game was succeeded the following year by WWE SmackDown! Shut Your Mouth, which was released in October 2002.

== Gameplay ==
This was the first game in the SmackDown! series to feature play-by-play commentary, with Michael Cole and Taz featured as the announcers. One improvement in this game is the appearance of six-man tag team matches, as well as six-man and eight-man battle royals. This would be the only game in the series in which players were allowed to have eight players on the screen at once until the release of WWE 2K18. Additionally, this was the first game of the series to give each wrestler two different finishing moves, as well as the first game to allow editing of the in-game wrestlers' move sets. Just Bring It was also the first game in the series to feature authentic, complete ring entrances. The game features several venues from 2000 and 2001, including the arena for Raw Is War and both the original and new arenas for SmackDown! (Ovaltron, including the Sunday Night Heat version, and the Fist stages). However, all pay-per-view arenas (except for WrestleMania X-Seven and Insurrextion) utilize the same arena with different logos on the ring mat, with the arena being based on the design of WrestleMania 2000.

The game's roster was criticised at the time for being heavily outdated, as it was finalized very early in WWF's Invasion angle and prior to the emergence of several former ECW and WCW wrestlers. Whilst William Regal, Raven, Rhyno, Tajiri, Spike Dudley, Jerry Lynn and Molly Holly were all new additions to the game, several stars who had become more prominent on WWF television, such as Rob Van Dam, Booker T, Diamond Dallas Page, the Hurricane, Lance Storm and Mike Awesome were not included, which was also reflected by the inclusion of Fully Loaded 2000 as one of the featured pay-per-view mats instead of Invasion. In addition to these, Limp Bizkit vocalist Fred Durst appears in the game as an agreement with the WWF and THQ which allowed their song "Rollin' (Air Raid Vehicle)" to be included as the Undertaker's then-theme music (it is one of his few game appearances, he also appears in WWF Raw for the Xbox). This is also the only WWF game in which Jerry Lynn appears, as he would be gone from the company within five months of its release. This is also the first WWF game to not feature Chyna due to her departure after Judgment Day months earlier.

A new gameplay addition is the reversal system. Just Bring It utilizes a counter-attack mechanic system that allows almost every move to be countered, as well as allowing some counter-attacks (such as punches) to be re-countered.

=== Game modes ===
Rather than the Season Modes presented in the previous SmackDown! games, Just Bring It instead has a Story Mode. The player is given more control over their wrestler's activities, such as having the ability to choose which WWF title to go after. Throughout Story Mode, the player is able to attain unlockables, including additional superstars, arenas, and match types.

== Release ==
The game ended up selling more than 400,000 units in North America, for which it was added to the Sony Greatest Hits collection for the PlayStation 2 in October 2002, and became THQ's second Greatest Hits game, only bested by Red Faction.

Due to a trademark dispute between the Federation and the World Wildlife Fund over the use of the "WWF" initialism, the Federation changed their name to World Wrestling Entertainment (WWE) in May 2002. Later re-releases of the title for PlayStation's budget range were released with WWE branding on packaging, however the internal contents retained all "WWF" references. This caused a British legal dispute between the WWE and the World Wildlife Fund. WWE won in the Court of Appeal in April 2003 as the court ruled it would have been impractical to have removed the "WWF" references from the game, and the Fund failed to demonstrate any harm caused to their brand.

== Reception ==
Reception

Aggregate score
Aggregator	Score
Metacritic	76/100

Review scores
Publication	Score
AllGame	4/5
Electronic Gaming Monthly	7.67/10
Eurogamer	7/10
Famitsu	29/40
Game Informer	8/10
GamePro	4/5
GameRevolution	B+
GameSpot	8.1/10
GameSpy	85%
GameZone	8/10
IGN	7.8/10
Next Generation	3/5
Official U.S. PlayStation Magazine	3.5/5
BBC Sport	87%
Maxim	8/10

The game received "generally favorable reviews" according to video game review aggregator Metacritic. However, the game's in-game commentary has been criticized for being disjointed and repetitive, with noticeable pauses when calling wrestler or move names. Gary Whitta of Next Generation was positive to the game despite acknowledging its flaws. In Japan, Famitsu gave it a score of 29 out of 40.

It received a "Platinum" sales award from the Entertainment and Leisure Software Publishers Association (ELSPA), indicating sales of at least 300,000 copies in the United Kingdom.

== See also ==
- List of licensed wrestling video games
- List of fighting games
- List of video games in the WWE 2K Games series
