= WWF SmackDown! 2: Know Your Role =

2000 professional wrestling video game

- North American cover art featuring Chris Jericho, The Rock, Triple H, and The Undertaker (Note: The PAL-region cover art retains The Rock and Triple H, but they are featured in different poses. Chyna is also featured on the cover with Triple H.)
- Developer: Yuke's
- Publishers: WW: THQ; JP: Yuke's
- Director: Toshihiko Kitazawa
- Producer: Norifumi Hara
- Designer: Toshihiko Kitazawa
- Artist: Taku Chihaya
- Series: SmackDown!
- Platform: PlayStation
- Release: NA: November 20, 2000; EU: December 1, 2000; JP: January 25, 2001
- Genre: Sports
- Modes: Single-player, multiplayer

WWF SmackDown! 2: Know Your Role, known in Japan as Exciting Pro Wrestling 2 (エキサイティングプロレス2, Ekisaitingu Puro Resu 2), is a professional wrestling video game developed by Yuke's released in North America on November 20, 2000, Europe on December 1, 2000, and Japan on January 25, 2001 on the PlayStation by THQ. It is the sequel to WWF SmackDown!, and the second game in the SmackDown series, itself based on the World Wrestling Federation (WWF, now WWE) professional wrestling promotion.

Know Your Role achieved commercial success, becoming the best-selling combat sports game on a single format (PlayStation) with 3.2 million units sold. The game was succeeded by WWF SmackDown! Just Bring It in November 2001.

== Development ==
Development for WWF SmackDown! 2: Know Your Role began in early March 2000, almost immediately following the completion and release of WWF Smackdown! with Yuke’s transitioning the core team to the sequel to capitalize on the Attitude Era boom, thus the entire development cycle was condensed into around 8 to 9 months. The rapid turnaround was possible because Yuke’s utilized an iterative development process, building directly onto the engine they had just perfected for the first game. In the spring of the same year, the team focused on expanding the roster and adding the technical depth (like the Create-A-Moveset and Create-A-Stable features) that had been cut from the first game due to time constraints. On August 11, 2000, THQ officially announced the game to the public with the game later releasing on November 21, 2000.

This game is an expanded licensed build of The Pro Wrestling 2, a game from the Simple series and a sequel to The Pro Wrestling, as the background music that plays in Know Your Role's Create-A-Superstar mode is a remix to one of the songs that plays during a match in TPW2 having the same lyrics. Also, the timer, pin/ringout counter, and end-of-match messages in TPW2 (albeit with inverted palette) are exactly the same with the World Wrestling Federation logo. The two games were developed essentially side-by-side using the same codebase. The main deference between the titles were SmackDown! 2 acted as the premium version with the high-profile WWF license and The Pro Wrestling 2 was the budget-friendly, generic version. This double-duty development allowed Yuke’s to maximize the utility of their engine, which explains why many technical assets are shared between the two titles.

The expanded Season Mode, which introduced branched storylines and multiplayer support, was notoriously taxing on the PS1 hardware and is often cited as the biggest flaw. While the first SmackDown! was fast and arcade-like, Smackdown! 2 introduced several technical bottlenecks that the aging hardware struggled with. This resulted in the infamous long loading screens for even minor backstage segments because of where the data was located on older optical media like the PS1's CD-ROMs as, for the game, the spiral of data starts from the center and moves outward. In many disc drives, the laser can read data more reliably or even faster at the outer edges of the disc because the physical distance covered in one rotation is greater. By placing a large padding file (the tutorial video from another Yuke's title Evil Zone) at the beginning/middle of the disc's data structure, developers pushed the essential game files—like character models and ring textures—further toward the outer edge. This helped the PS1's aging laser find and load data more consistently, slightly improving load times. Unlike the first game's linear path, SmackDown! 2 featured a living season where every wrestler on the roster were competing in the background. Even when players weren't in a match, the game had to calculate the results of every other match on the card, update rankings, and check for interference or stable triggers. Even if players chose to Skip a match, the game still had to load the menu assets and process the win/loss data, which often took nearly as long as loading a short backstage brawl as the PS1 only had 2MB of Main RAM and 1MB of Video RAM and a data transfer rate of only 300 KB/s. Yuke's pushed the character models further in this title, adding more polygons and larger textures for the Attitude Era attire. Because the CAS system was now part-based rather than template-based, the game had to stitch together individual textures (boots, knee pads, masks, hair) every time a custom wrestler appeared. This required the disc laser to jump to multiple different sectors to find each specific part, increasing the seek time. To make the game feel big, Yuke's included full-motion video for the Titantrons and a larger library of music. Trying to pull high-quality audio, entrance videos, and character models simultaneously caused a chugging effect, causing the music to often cut out or loop awkwardly during transitions since the system was prioritizing gameplay data over audio. Because SmackDown! 2 was one of the first wrestling games to allow 4-player Season Mode, managing four separate player profiles, their individual win/loss records, and their specific alliances meant the game was constantly reading and writing to the Memory Card. On the PS1, Memory Card access was notoriously slow and would often pause all other loading processes until the save/load was complete. Ironically, the loading bar itself became an iconic part of the game's aesthetic. To distract players, Yuke's used high-resolution 2D renders of the superstars (such as The Rock or Triple H) during the wait. However, because these 2D images were also high-quality assets, they required their own amount of loading time.

== Gameplay ==
The Season Mode was heavily modified in this game. Along with removing the pre-season mode that was included in the original, Know Your Role gave more storylines and more matches per show. These changes were given a mixed reaction by fans and critics alike. Wrestlers, wrestling moves, and arenas are unlocked as the player progresses through a season. The Season Mode has multiplayer support, with up to four players playing at once in a Season. Wrestlers such as Shawn Michaels, Stone Cold Steve Austin, Billy Gunn, Mick Foley (including Cactus Jack) and Debra are unlockable characters.

This is also Michael Cole's second appearance as an unlockable character, with his first appearance being in WWF No Mercy. This would be Cole's last appearance as a playable character until WWE '12, where he was included as DLC.

Big Show and Ken Shamrock were initially playable in the game, but they were both removed before release. Big Show had been removed from the promotion's main roster and was sent to Ohio Valley Wrestling, while Shamrock left professional wrestling to return to mixed martial arts competition. Despite this, both characters have been known to randomly appear during a Royal Rumble match (which the player can take control of) and can be used in other modes via a GameShark code, although their names and select screen images were removed.

WWF SmackDown! 2: Know Your Role was the first game in the SmackDown series which introduced the advanced Create-A-Superstar, allowing the player to create a character in greater detail as opposed to just choosing preset mix-and-match templates like the previous game. A unique feature was also included in which players are allowed to assign managers such as Paul Bearer and Tori to different superstars. In addition, more features were added such as Create-A-Moveset, Create-A-Taunt, and Create-A-Stable which allowed up to 4 members.

== Reception ==
Reception

Aggregate score
Aggregator	Score
Metacritic	90/100

Review scores
Publication	Score
CNET Gamecenter	8/10
Computer and Video Games	5/5
Electronic Gaming Monthly	8.83/10 (Note: Two critics of Electronic Gaming Monthly gave the game each a score of 9/10, and the other gave it 8.5/10.)
EP Daily	7.5/10
Famitsu	30/40
Game Informer	9/10
GameRevolution	B+
GameSpot	8.8/10
IGN	8.9/10
Next Generation	3/5
Official U.S. PlayStation Magazine	5/5
X-Play	3/5
The Cincinnati Enquirer	4/5

The game received "universal acclaim" according to video game review aggregator Metacritic. Daniel Erickson of NextGen commended tons of options and multiplayer matches, but was critical to the game's Story mode. In Japan, Famitsu gave it a score of 30 out of 40.

Star Dingo of GamePro praised the selection of wrestlers, matches and new options in the game, such as Anywhere Fall mode, but considered Season mode "tiresome". (Note: GamePro gave the game two 4.5/5 scores for graphics and fun factor, and two 4/5 scores for sound and control in one review.) In another GamePro review, Lamchop commended gameplay, controls, and graphics, but was critical to the Story mode and noted the lack of commentary and wrestler voices. The reviewer called it the best wrestling title for the PlayStation. (Note: GamePro gave the game 5/5 for graphics, 3/5 for sound, 4/5 for control, and 4.5/5 for fun factor in another review.)

The game received a "Platinum" sales award from the Entertainment and Leisure Software Publishers Association (ELSPA), indicating sales of at least 300,000 units in the UK.

The game was nominated for the "Best Sports Game (Alternative)" award at GameSpot's Best and Worst of 2000 Awards, which went to Tony Hawk's Pro Skater 2. It was also a runner-up for the "Best Extreme Sports Game" and "Best Multiplayer Game" awards at the Official U.S. PlayStation Magazine 2000 Editors' Awards, both of which went to SSX and TimeSplitters. The game won the award for Action in Readers' Choice at IGN's Best of 2000 Awards.

After the company changed its name to World Wrestling Entertainment (WWE) in May 2002 due to the WWF trademark dispute, some later reprints of the game (part of Greatest Hits in North America, PlayStation Platinum in Europe, and PSOne Books in Japan) were modified to include the WWE branding on the cover and disc labels, although the in-game "WWF" references remained unchanged.
