= WWF Raw (2002 video game) =

- WWE Raw version cover art featuring The Undertaker, Jeff Hardy, Kane and Triple H
- Developer: Anchor Inc.
- Publishers: WW: THQ; JP: Kadokawa Shoten
- Director: Hiroshi Inukai
- Designer: Kentaro Arai
- Composer: Takayuki Nakamura
- Platforms: Xbox; Microsoft Windows
- Release: Xbox; NA: February 12, 2002; EU: September 27, 2002; JP: October 3, 2002; Microsoft Windows; NA: October 14, 2002; EU: November 1, 2002
- Genre: Sports
- Modes: Single-player, multiplayer

WWF Raw is a professional wrestling video game released on the Xbox and Microsoft Windows by THQ in 2002. It is based on the television series of the same name. It was the first WWF game released on the Xbox and also the last WWF game released on PC until the release of WWE 2K15 12 years later in 2014. It is also the last game released under the WWF name as the World Wrestling Federation changed its name to World Wrestling Entertainment (WWE) in May of that year following a lawsuit.

== Gameplay ==
The game offers the players a wrestling experience with various matches like singles match, tag team match, triple threat, fatal four-way, battle royal and handicap matches. The players can also play various tournaments such as King of the Ring and several title tournaments. They can create their own character as well as their attire, move set and entrance. The game has a weak/strong grapple system and there are two types of grapples: one which is done with normal opponents and other with groggy opponents. The normal grapples do little harm when compared to grapples done when the opponent is stunned. There is a voltage meter which shows the momentum of the wrestlers. Special move, high flying attacks and taunting boost momentum while repeated attacks cost loss in momentum. Finishers can only be applied when the opponent is stunned and the voltage meter is flashing. Excessive use of finisher also cause loss in momentum.

== Development ==
During development, the game was originally called WWF Raw is War, but the title was changed after the WWF shortened the television show's title in October 2001 due to the end of Monday Night War. In Japan, a limited edition was released with a shirt and a figure of The Undertaker or "Hollywood" Hulk Hogan (who does not appear in the game).

=== Release ===
The game was released in North America on February 11, 2002, and in Europe on September 27, 2002. The packaging of the latter renamed the title to WWE Raw, although the game retained all WWF branding.

The game was published in Japan by Kadokawa Shoten in October 2002, and released in a standard edition containing just the game, and a limited edition containing a The Rock T-shirt and one of four action figures from the Jakks Pacific range.

== Reception ==
Reception

Aggregate score
Aggregator	Score	
Aggregator	PC	Xbox
Metacritic	54/100	68/100

Review scores
Publication	Score	
Publication	PC	Xbox
AllGame	N/A	2.5/5
Electronic Gaming Monthly	N/A	6/10
Famitsu	N/A	10/40
Game Informer	N/A	6.5/10
GamePro	N/A	3.5/5
GameRevolution	N/A	C
GameSpot	5.7/10	6.5/10
GameSpy	N/A	85%
GameZone	6/10	7.8/10
IGN	N/A	9.1/10
Official Xbox Magazine (US)	N/A	5.7/10
PC Gamer (US)	73%	N/A

The game received "mixed or average reviews" on both platforms according to video game review aggregator Metacritic. In Japan, Famitsu gave the Xbox version an unfavorably low score of 10 out of 40.

In its first week, the game sold the most units ever for a third-party Xbox game, second only to Halo.

== Sequel ==
A sequel to the game, titled WWE Raw 2, was released in 2003 on the Xbox.

== See also ==
- List of licensed wrestling video games
- List of fighting games
