= Triple H =

American business executive, professional wrestling promoter and wrestler (born 1969)

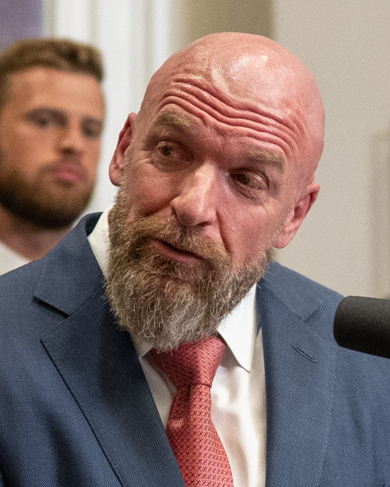
- Levesque in 2025 at the White House
- Born: Paul Michael Levesque; July 27, 1969 (age 57); Nashua, New Hampshire, U.S.
- Occupations: Business executive; professional wrestler; actor
- Years active: 1992–2022 (wrestling); 1998–2017 (acting); 2010–present (business)
- Spouse: Stephanie McMahon (m. 2003)
- Children: 3
- Family: McMahon (Note: Member of the McMahon family via marriage)
- Professional wrestling career
- Ring name(s): Hunter Hearst Helmsley; Jean-Paul Lévesque; Paul Levesque; Paul "Triple H" Levesque; Terra Risin'; Terra Ryzing; Terror Rising; Triple H
- Billed height: 6 ft 4 in (193 cm)
- Billed weight: 255 lb (116 kg)
- Billed from: Boston, Massachusetts; Greenwich, Connecticut; Sainte-Mère-Église, France
- Trained by: Killer Kowalski
- Debut: March 24, 1992
- Retired: April 2, 2022

Signature
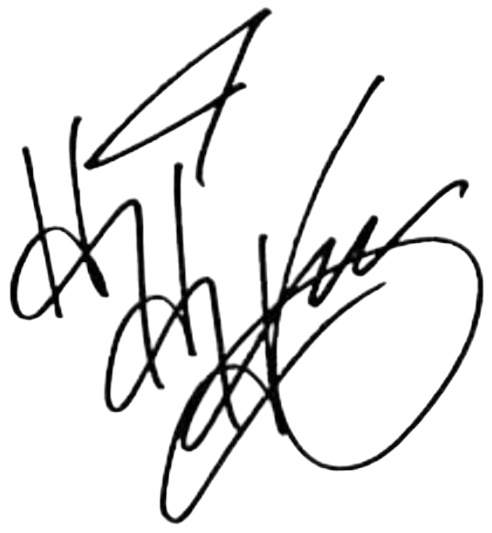

Paul Michael Levesque (/ləˈvɛk/; born July 27, 1969), also known by his ring name Triple H, is an American business executive, professional wrestling promoter, and retired wrestler. He is signed to WWE, where he serves as its chief content officer, its head of creative, and an executive producer.

Levesque began his wrestling career in 1992 under the ring name Terra Ryzing, and gained his first mainstream exposure in World Championship Wrestling (WCW) in 1994, becoming known as Jean-Paul Levesque. In 1995, he signed with the World Wrestling Federation (WWF, now WWE) and became known as Hunter Hearst Helmsley, which was later shortened to Triple H. In WWF, he gained fame during the Attitude Era as a member of The Kliq and co-founder of D-Generation X. Amongst other wrestling accomplishments, he is a 14-time world champion in WWE, having won the WWF/WWE Championship nine times and the World Heavyweight Championship five times, a two-time Royal Rumble winner (2002, 2016), the seventh Triple Crown winner, and second Grand Slam winner. He has headlined multiple WWE pay-per-view events, including its flagship annual event, WrestleMania, seven times. In 2022, he retired from working as an in-ring performer due to health concerns but remains active in an executive role and as an on-screen presence.

Through his marriage to Stephanie McMahon, he is a member of the McMahon family, which held a controlling interest over WWE until its sale to Endeavor in 2023. Levesque was involved with the creation and expansion of WWE's developmental branch, NXT. He was inducted into the WWE Hall of Fame's 2019 class as part of D-Generation X and for his individual career in the class of 2025. Outside of wrestling, he has acted with roles in Blade: Trinity (2004) and The Chaperone (2011).

== Early life ==
Paul Michael Levesque was born in Nashua, New Hampshire, on July 27, 1969. He has a sister named Lynn. His first experience of watching professional wrestling was seeing a match involving Chief Jay Strongbow as a young child, and he took up bodybuilding at the age of 14 because he wanted to look like the professional wrestlers he saw. He graduated in 1987 from Nashua High School, where he played baseball and basketball. He continued to enter bodybuilding competitions and won the 1988 Mr. Teenage New Hampshire competition at the age of 19. While working as the manager of a gym in Nashua, he was introduced to champion powerlifter and professional wrestler Ted Arcidi, who was signed to WWE at the time. After numerous attempts, he persuaded Arcidi to introduce him to professional wrestler Killer Kowalski, who ran a professional wrestling school in Malden, Massachusetts.

== Professional wrestling career ==
=== Training and early career (1990–1993) ===
In early 1990, Levesque began to train as a professional wrestler at Killer Kowalski's school in Malden. His classmates included fellow future WWF wrestlers Chyna, whom he would later date, and Perry Saturn. He made his professional debut under the ring name Terra Ryzing (a play on "terrorizing") in Kowalski's International Wrestling Federation (IWF) on March 24, 1992, defeating Tony Roy. In July 1992, he defeated Mad Dog Richard to win the IWF Heavyweight Championship. Managed by John Rodeo, he wrestled for various promotions on the East Coast independent circuit until 1993.

=== World Championship Wrestling (1994–1995) ===
In early 1994, Levesque signed a one-year contract with World Championship Wrestling (WCW). In his first televised match, he debuted as a heel named Terror Risin', defeating Keith Cole. His ring name was soon modified to Terra Ryzing, For the first few months of his career, he wrestled primarily on WCW Pro, WCW Worldwide, and WCW Saturday Night. On two occasions, he unsuccessfully challenged WCW World Television Champion Larry Zbyszko.

in mid-1994, Levesque adopted the new ring name Jean-Paul Lévesque. This gimmick referred to his real surname's French origins, and he was asked to speak with a French accent as he could not speak French. He began using what would become his popular finishing maneuver, the Pedigree, during this time. He faced Johnny B. Badd in a series of matches for the WCW World Television Championship, and teamed with Paul Roma to repeatedly unsuccessfully challenge WCW World Tag Team Champions Stars and Stripes. Lévesque had a brief feud with Alex Wright, including a pay-per-view on December 27 at Starrcade '94: Triple Threat with Wright pinning him. In December 1994, Lévesque teamed with English wrestler Lord Steven Regal, whose upper class British gimmick was similar to Lévesque's character; in real life, they became close friends, and Regal would serve as his right-hand man behind the scenes in WWE decades later. Levesque left WCW in January 1995 after failing to come to terms on a new contract.

=== World Wrestling Federation / Entertainment / WWE (1995–present) ===
==== Intercontinental Champion (1995–1997) ====
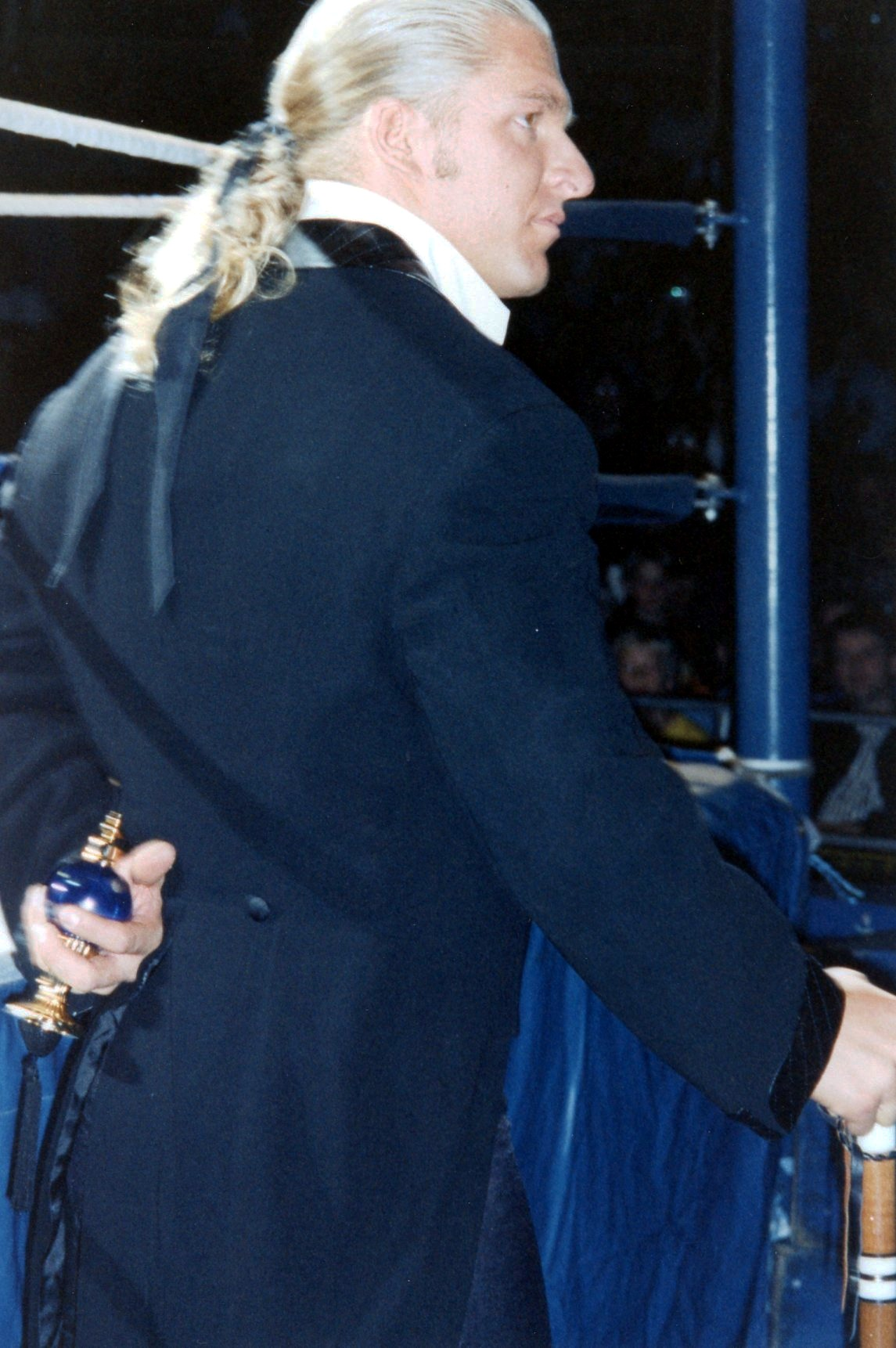
Helmsley wore a tailcoat suit and carried a traditional atomizer perfume bottle to highlight his extreme snobbishness.

In a modified version of his gimmick in WCW, Levesque started his WWF career as a "Connecticut Blueblood". According to Levesque, J. J. Dillon originally gave him the name of Reginald DuPont Helmsley, but Levesque asked for a name to play with the first letters and management ultimately agreed to his suggestion of Hunter Hearst Helmsley. He appeared in taped vignettes, in which he talked about how to use proper etiquette, up until his wrestling debut on the April 30, 1995, episode of Wrestling Challenge defeating Buck Zumhofe. Helmsley made his WWF pay-per-view debut on August 27 at SummerSlam, defeating Bob Holly. Helmsley remained undefeated during the early months of his career, suffering his first pinfall at the hands of The Undertaker in a Survivor Series match at the namesake event. In the fall of 1995, Helmsley began a feud with hog farmer Henry O. Godwinn, whom he defeated in the infamous Hog Pen match on December 17 at In Your House 5: Seasons Beatings.

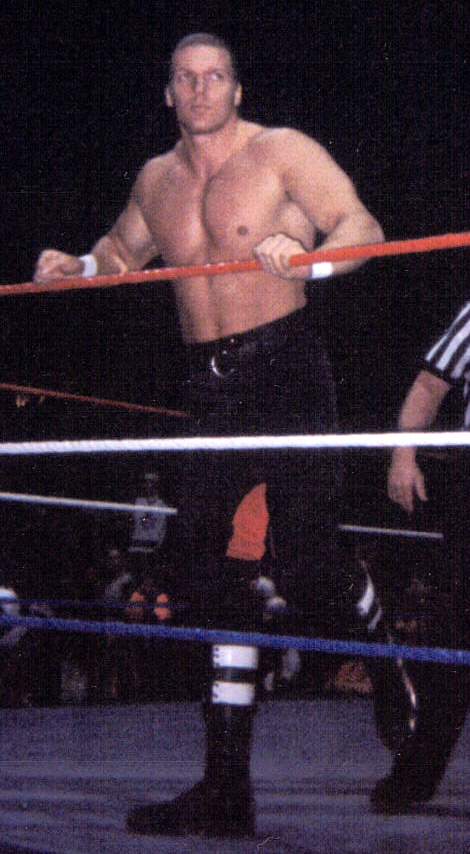
Helmsley in 1996

After being highly promoted in the first few months after his debut, his career stalled during 1996, starting off with a feud with Duke "The Dumpster" Droese following a loss during the Free for All at 1996 Royal Rumble. Up until that event, his angle included appearing on television each week with a different female valet (which included Playboy Playmates Shae Marks and Tylyn John). It was during this time that Helmsley suffered his first loss in singles competition in WWF, against Bret Hart on the March 4 episode of Raw. Sable would become Helmsley's valet at WrestleMania XII on March 31 and after his loss to Ultimate Warrior, as part of the storyline, he took his aggressions out on her. The debuting Marc Mero (her real-life husband) came to her rescue, starting a feud between the two wrestlers.

On June 1, 1996, Hunter appeared on an episode of Superstars in a match against Marty Garner. When he attempted to perform the Pedigree, Garner mistook the maneuver for a double underhook suplex and tried to jump up with the move, causing him to land squarely on top of his head and suffer neck damage. Garner reportedly sued the WWF, eventually settling out of court. However, in 2020, Garner affirmed there was no lawsuit.

He was known backstage as a member of The Kliq (alongside Shawn Michaels, Kevin Nash, Sean Waltman, and Scott Hall), a group known for influencing Vince McMahon and the WWF creative team. It is widely believed that he was scheduled to win the 1996 King of the Ring tournament, but the victory was instead awarded to Stone Cold Steve Austin after the "Curtain Call" incident at Madison Square Garden, in which the Kliq members openly broke character in front of fans after a match to say goodbye to the departing Nash and Hall. Despite the punishment, Helmsley did have success following the incident. Mr. Perfect became his manager and he won the Intercontinental Championship for the first time on October 21 by defeating Marc Mero. When Mr. Perfect left the WWF, his departure was explained to be a result of Helmsley turning his back on his manager as soon as he won the Intercontinental Championship. Helmsley held the title for nearly four months before dropping it to Rocky Maivia on Thursday Raw Thursday, a special episode of Raw that aired on February 13, 1997. For a very brief time, Helmsley was accompanied by Mr. Hughes, who was his storyline bodyguard reminiscent of Ted DiBiase and Virgil. After losing the title, he feuded with Goldust, defeating him on March 23 at WrestleMania 13. During their feud, Chyna debuted as his new bodyguard.

==== D-Generation X (1997–1999) ====
Helmsley was being highlighted again in 1997, winning the 1997 King of the Ring tournament by defeating Mankind in the finals. Later that year, Shawn Michaels, Helmsley, Chyna and Rick Rude formed D-Generation X (DX). This stable became known for pushing the envelope, as Michaels and Helmsley made risqué promos—using the catchphrase "Suck It" and a "crotch chop" hand motion—and sarcastically derided Bret Hart and Canada. By that point, Helmsley had all but dropped the "blueblood snob" gimmick, appearing in T-shirts and leather jackets. During this period, his ring name was shortened to simply Triple H, though he was still called Helmsley from time to time and Hunter for the rest of his career. Even after DX's feud with Hart Foundation storyline ended, he continued to feud with the sole remaining Hart family member Owen over the European Championship, which Helmsley won by "defeating" Michaels after Michaels laid down for him on December 11, which aired on the December 22 episode of Raw is War. Triple H lost the title to Hart after The Artist Formerly Known as Goldust competed against Hart in drag as Triple H on the January 22 episode of Raw is War. Triple H defeated Hart to win his second European Championship on the March 16 episode of Raw is War. At WrestleMania XIV on March 29, Triple H defended the title against Hart in a rematch, with the stipulation that Chyna had to be handcuffed to then-Commissioner Sgt. Slaughter. Triple H won after Chyna threw powder into Slaughter's eyes, momentarily "blinding" him and allowing her to interfere in the match.

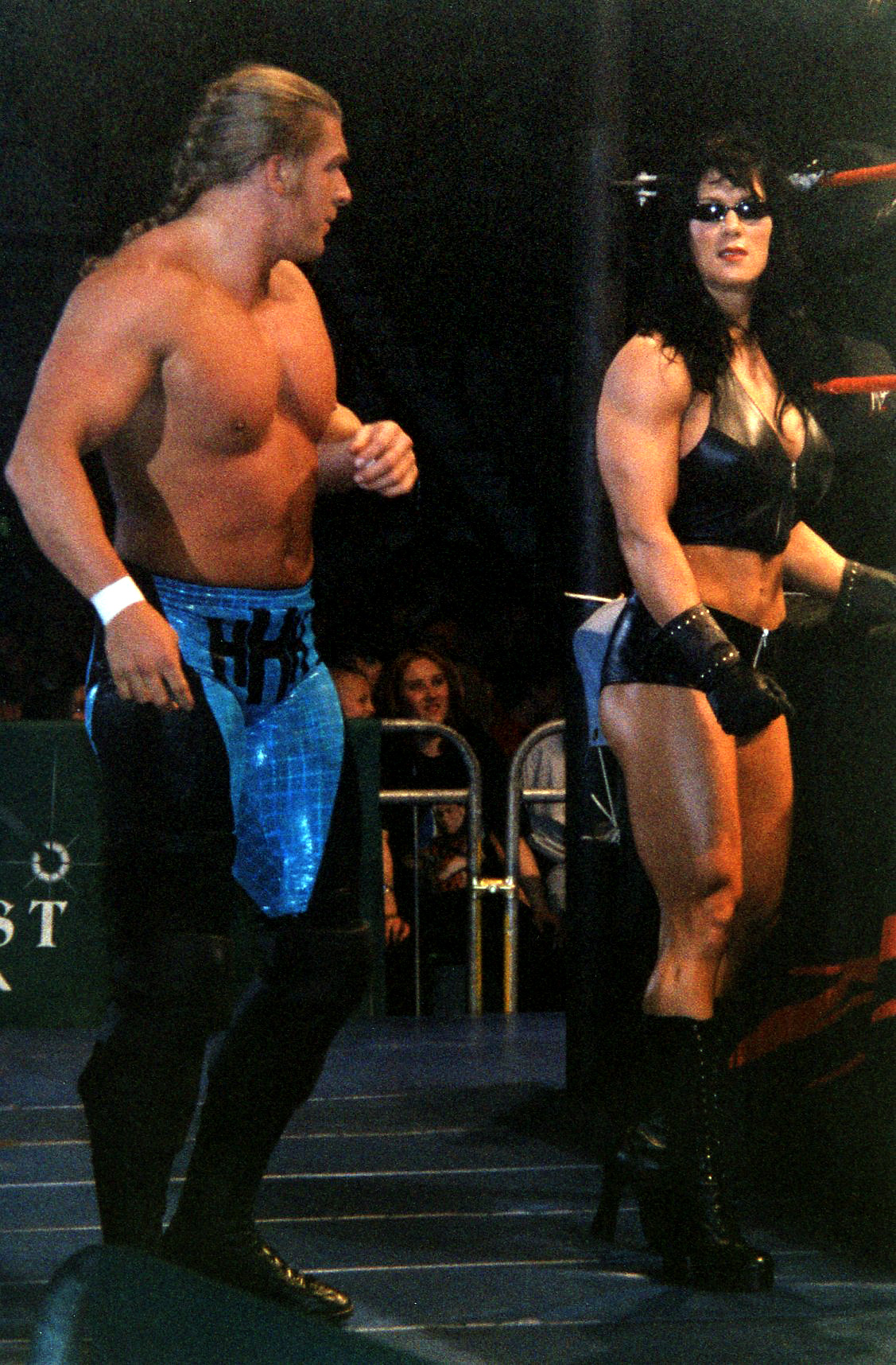
Triple H and then-girlfriend Chyna in April 1999

After WrestleMania, Shawn Michaels was forced into temporary retirement due to a legitimate back injury sustained in January at the Royal Rumble, with Triple H taking over the leadership position in DX, claiming that his now-former associate had "dropped the ball". He introduced the returning X-Pac the night after WrestleMania and joined forces with The New Age Outlaws. As 1998 went along, DX became more popular, turning the group from villains to fan favorites. During this time, he adopted an entrance gimmick of asking the crowd "Are you ready? I said, are you ready?", followed by a parody of rival promotion WCW's ring announcer Michael Buffer's famous catch-phrase, "Let's get ready to rumble", substituting the word "rumble" with the DX slogan, "suck it". Also during this time, Triple H began a feud with the leader of the Nation of Domination and rising WWF villain, The Rock. This storyline rivalry eventually led to a feud over the Intercontinental Championship. As part of the feud, Triple H lost the European Championship to Rock's Nation teammate D-Lo Brown on the July 20 episode of Raw is War. Triple H eventually defeated Rock in a ladder match to win his second Intercontinental Championship on August 30 at SummerSlam. He did not hold the title long, as he was sidelined with a legitimate knee injury. When The Rock won the WWF Championship on November 15 at Survivor Series, the rivalry between the two continued, as DX fought The Corporation stable of which The Rock was the main star and Triple H received a shot at the WWF Championship on the January 25, 1999, Raw is War in an "I Quit" match, but the match ended when Triple H was forced to quit or see his aide Chyna chokeslammed by Kane. This began a new angle for Triple H, as Chyna betrayed him by attacking him after the match and joining The Corporation.

On March 28 at WrestleMania XV, Triple H lost to Kane after Chyna interfered on his behalf and she was thought to have rejoined DX. Later on in the night, he betrayed his long-time friend and fellow DX member X-Pac by helping Shane McMahon retain the European Championship and joined The Corporation, turning heel in the process. In April, he started to move away from his DX look, taping his fists for matches, sporting shorter wrestling trunks, and adopting a shorter hairstyle. His gimmick changed as he fought to earn a WWF Championship opportunity. After failed attempts at winning the championship, Triple H and Mankind challenged then WWF Champion Stone Cold Steve Austin to a triple threat match on August 22 at SummerSlam, which featured Jesse "The Body" Ventura as the special guest referee. Mankind won the match by pinning Austin.

The following night on Raw Is War, Triple H defeated Mankind to win his first WWF Championship. He dropped the WWF Championship to Mr. McMahon on the September 16, 1999, episode of SmackDown! before regaining it on September 26 at Unforgiven in a Six-Pack Challenge that included Davey Boy Smith, Big Show, Kane, The Rock and Mankind. He defeated Stone Cold Steve Austin on October 17 at No Mercy before dropping the title to Big Show on November 14 at Survivor Series. Triple H then continued his feud with Mr. McMahon by marrying his daughter Stephanie McMahon and defeating McMahon on December 12 at Armageddon. As a result of the feud, an angle with Triple H and Stephanie began which carried the WWF throughout the next seventeen months; together they were known as The McMahon-Helmsley Faction.

==== McMahon–Helmsley Era (2000–2001) ====
By January 2000, Triple H had nicknamed himself "The Game" after stating he was above the top of the wrestling world (as in not merely the "best in the game" but in fact "the game" itself) and was nicknamed "The Cerebral Assassin" by Jim Ross. On the January 3 episode of Raw Is War, Triple H defeated Big Show to win his third WWF Championship.

Triple H feuded with Mick Foley in early 2000. On January 23 at the Royal Rumble, Triple H retained the WWF Championship in a Street Fight after performing two Pedigrees on Foley. The feud ended on February 27 at No Way Out inside Hell in a Cell, where Triple H retained the title and forced Foley to retire. Triple H defeated The Rock, Mick Foley and Big Show in a Fatal 4-Way elimination match at WrestleMania 2000 on April 2 to retain the title, but lost it on April 30 at Backlash to The Rock, ending his reign at 118 days. Triple H regained it three weeks later, in an Iron Man match against The Rock on May 21 at Judgment Day, only to lose it back to The Rock on June 25 at King of the Ring. Triple H then entered a storyline with Chris Jericho, who upset Triple H by defeating him for the WWF Championship on the April 17 episode of Raw Is War before the title was returned to Triple H because of a fast count made by referee Earl Hebner, and Jericho's reign is not recognized. Their feud culminated in a Last Man Standing match at Fully Loaded on July 23 which Triple H won. Triple H feuded with Kurt Angle, initially over the WWF Championship, but then as a love triangle between himself, Angle, and Stephanie. Both Triple H and Angle wrestled for the WWF Championship against The Rock on August 27 at SummerSlam, but The Rock retained the title after Angle received a legit concussion during a botched Pedigree on a commentary table by Triple H. The feud culminated at Unforgiven on September 24, where Triple H defeated Angle with a Pedigree after a low blow from McMahon.

After a brief run as a face that saw Triple H defeat Chris Benoit on October 22 at No Mercy, Triple H reverted to his heel persona and restarted his feud with Stone Cold Steve Austin when it emerged that Triple H had paid off Rikishi to run down Austin at Survivor Series, causing him to take a year off. While Triple H said he had done it in order to shield Austin from the WWF Championship and end his career in storyline, Austin's previous neck injuries started bothering him again in reality, forcing him to have surgery. At Survivor Series on November 19, Triple H and Austin had a match that ended when Triple H tried to trick Austin into coming into the parking lot to run him over again, only to have Austin lift his car up with a forklift and flip the car onto its roof 10 feet high. A brutal Three Stages of Hell match between the two at No Way Out on February 25, 2001, saw Triple H defeat Austin 2–1, thus ending their feud. The Three Stages of Hell match received universal acclaim and is widely regarded as one of the most brutal and one of the best professional wrestling match of all times. Triple H also feuded with The Undertaker, who defeated him on April 1 at WrestleMania X-Seven. The night after WrestleMania, Triple H interfered in a steel cage match between Austin (who had just won the WWF Championship) and The Rock where he joined forces with Austin and double teamed on The Rock, forming a tag team called The Two-Man Power Trip. Triple H then defeated Chris Jericho for his third Intercontinental Championship on the April 5 SmackDown!, and won it for a fourth time two weeks later by defeating Jeff Hardy. Triple H then became a world tag team champion by winning the WWF Tag Team Championship for the first time at Backlash on April 29 when he and Austin defeated Kane and The Undertaker in a "Winner Take All" tag team match. As Triple H was still Intercontinental Champion, the win made him a double champion. In doing so, Triple H became the seventh Triple Crown winner and second Grand Slam winner in WWE history.

During the main event of the May 21, 2001, episode of Raw Is War, Triple H suffered a legitimate and career-threatening injury. He and Austin were defending the WWF Tag Team Championship against Chris Jericho and Chris Benoit. At one point, Jericho had Austin trapped in the Walls of Jericho and Triple H ran in to break it up, but just as he did, he suffered a tear in his left quadriceps muscle, causing it to come completely off the bone. Despite Triple H's inability to place any weight on his leg, he was able to complete the match, and even allowed Jericho to put him in the Walls of Jericho, a move that places considerable stress on the quadriceps. Jericho and Benoit won the match and the titles. The tear required an operation, which was performed by orthopedic surgeon Dr. James Andrews. This injury brought an abrupt end to the McMahon-Helmsley Era, as the rigorous rehabilitation process kept Triple H out of action for over eight months, completely missing The Invasion storyline.

==== World Heavyweight Champion and Evolution (2002–2005) ====
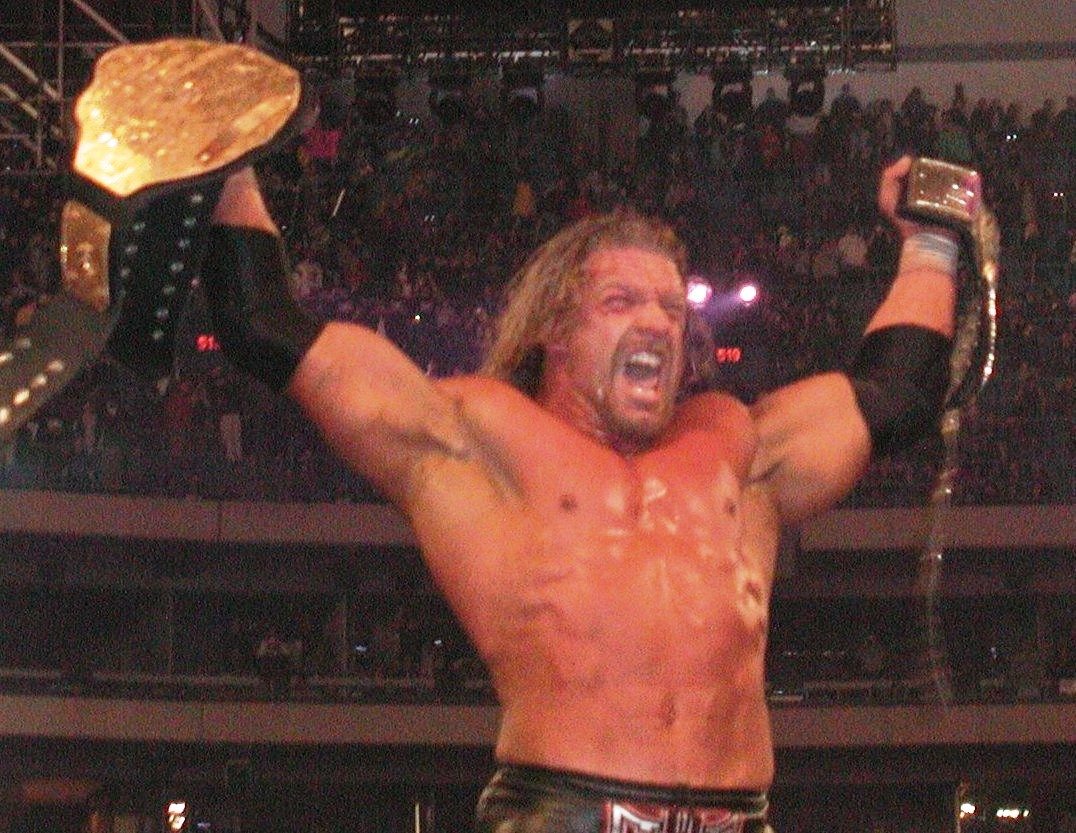
Triple H after he won the Undisputed WWF Championship at WrestleMania X8

Triple H returned to Raw as a face on January 7, 2002, at Madison Square Garden. He won the Royal Rumble on January 20, receiving an Undisputed WWF Championship match on March 17 at WrestleMania X8, where Triple H defeated Chris Jericho for the Undisputed WWF Championship. After holding the title for a month, Triple H lost it to Hollywood Hulk Hogan on April 21 at Backlash. Triple H then became exclusive to the SmackDown! roster due to the WWF draft lottery and continued to feud with Jericho, culminating in a Hell in a Cell match on May 19 at Judgment Day, which Triple H won. On the June 6 episode of SmackDown!, Triple H defeated Hogan in a #1 contender match for the WWE Undisputed Championship at King of the Ring against The Undertaker, but was unsuccessful at King of the Ring on June 23.

In the interim, between the Royal Rumble and WrestleMania, the McMahon-Helmsley Faction was brought to an official on-screen conclusion. By the time he returned, Triple H's on-screen marriage to Stephanie McMahon was faltering, so Stephanie faked a pregnancy in order to get him back on her side. When he learned that it was fake, he dumped her publicly on Raw when they were supposed to renew their wedding vows. Stephanie aligned with Jericho afterward, but she was forced to leave after losing a triple threat match on the March 25 episode of Raw when she was pinned by Triple H. The divorce, and thus the storyline, was finalized on July 21 at Vengeance.

Meanwhile, Shawn Michaels had made his return to WWE and joined the New World Order (nWo). Michaels and Kevin Nash planned to bring Triple H over to Raw in order to put him into the group. Mr. McMahon disbanded the nWo following several backstage complications and brought in Eric Bischoff as the Raw general manager. One of Bischoff's first intentions was to follow up on the nWo's plan and bring Triple H over to the Raw roster. Triple H moved to the Raw brand at Vengeance, reuniting with Michaels, but he turned on Michaels by performing a Pedigree on him during what was supposed to be a DX reunion, turning heel once again. The following week, Triple H smashed Michaels' face into a car window to prove that Michaels was weak. These events led to the beginning of a long storyline rivalry between the former partners and an eventual "Unsanctioned Street Fight" on August 25 at SummerSlam, in which Michaels came out of retirement to win. Triple H then attacked him with a sledgehammer and he was carried from the ring on a stretcher.

Before September 2, 2002, WWE recognized only one world champion, the WWE Undisputed Champion, for both the Raw and SmackDown! brands. After SummerSlam, then WWE Undisputed Champion Brock Lesnar became exclusive to the SmackDown! brand, leaving the Raw brand without a world champion. Raw General Manager Eric Bischoff then awarded Triple H the World Heavyweight Championship, represented by the Big Gold Belt (which previously had been used to represent the NWA World Heavyweight Championship and WCW World Heavyweight Championship), making him the first World Heavyweight Champion. Triple H retained his title against Rob Van Dam on September 22 at Unforgiven when Ric Flair hit Van Dam with a sledgehammer.

In October, Triple H began a controversial feud with Kane, leading to a match at No Mercy in which both Kane's Intercontinental Championship and Triple H's World Heavyweight Championship were at stake. In the weeks preceding the match, Triple H claimed that, several years earlier, Kane had an unrequited relationship with a woman named Katie Vick. He went on to claim that, after Vick was killed in a car crash, Kane (the driver) raped her corpse. Triple H later threatened to show video footage of Kane committing the act in question; the footage that finally aired showed Triple H (dressed as Kane) simulating necrophilia with a mannequin in a casket; Kane's tag team partner The Hurricane responded the following week by showing a video of Triple H (rather, someone wearing a Triple H series of masks) getting an enema. The angle was very unpopular with fans, and was de-emphasized before the title match. Triple H went on to defeat Kane at No Mercy on October 20, unifying the two titles.

Triple H eventually lost the World Heavyweight Championship to Shawn Michaels in the first Elimination Chamber match on November 17 at Survivor Series. He defeated Van Dam on the December 2 episode of Raw to earn a title shot at Armageddon with Michaels as the special guest referee. He regained the title from Michaels in a Three Stages of Hell match at Armageddon on December 15, winning 2–1.

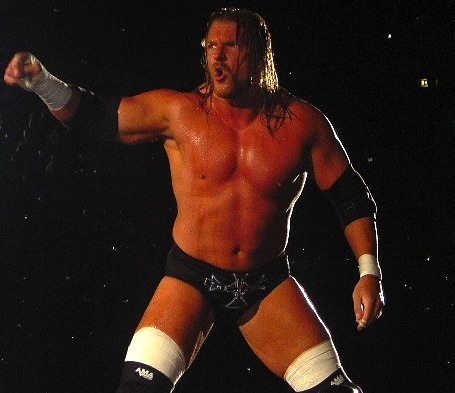
Triple H in April 2005

In February 2003, Triple H formed a stable known as Evolution with Ric Flair, Randy Orton, and Batista. The group was heavily pushed on Raw and the height of their dominance occurred after Armageddon, where every member of Evolution left the event holding a title. Triple H held the World Heavyweight Championship for most of 2003, successfully defending against Booker T on March 30 at WrestleMania XIX in an angle with racist undertones. He lost the title after 280 days on September 21 at Unforgiven to Goldberg, in a match with the stipulation that had Goldberg lost, he would have to retire. After failing to win back the title from Goldberg in a rematch on November 16 at Survivor Series, he finally regained the championship from Goldberg in a triple threat match at Armageddon on December 14, which also involved Kane. Triple H fought Shawn Michaels in a Last Man Standing match on January 25, 2004, at the Royal Rumble to a double countout, so he retained the title as a result. Triple H lost the championship to Chris Benoit on March 14 at WrestleMania XX in a triple threat match also involving Michaels. Triple H was drafted to the SmackDown! brand on the March 22 episode of Raw and failed to capture the WWE Championship from Eddie Guerrero. Triple H was traded back to Raw without competing on SmackDown! and tried to reclaim the World Heavyweight title from Benoit in a WrestleMania rematch against Benoit and Michaels on April 18 at Backlash, but was unsuccessful.

At Bad Blood on June 13, Triple H defeated Michaels in the longest Hell in a Cell match in history, ending their feud. He failed to win the title from Benoit on July 11 at Vengeance and on the July 26 episode of Raw in a 60-Minute Iron Man match after interference from Eugene, whom he defeated on August 15 at SummerSlam. The following night on Raw, Triple H turned on his protège Randy Orton (who became the youngest world champion in WWE history at SummerSlam), expressing jealousy over Orton's title victory. He regained the championship from Orton on September 12 at Unforgiven. Following a triple threat World Heavyweight title defense against Benoit and Edge on the November 29 episode of Raw, the World Heavyweight Championship became vacant for the first time. At New Year's Revolution on January 9, 2005, Triple H won an Elimination Chamber match to regain the World Heavyweight Championship after last eliminating Orton, then retained the title against him on January 30 at the Royal Rumble to end their feud. That same night, his stablemate Batista won the Royal Rumble match, earning a world title match at WrestleMania 21. Tension between the two began in the weeks leading up to the event as Triple H convinced Batista to challenge for the WWE Championship instead of his World Heavyweight Championship. On the February 21 episode of Raw, Batista turned on Triple H and signed a contract to face him for the World Heavyweight Championship at WrestleMania. At WrestleMania on April 3, Triple H lost the championship to Batista, and subsequently lost two rematches on May 1 at Backlash and on June 26 at Vengeance, where Batista became the first man to pin Triple H inside Hell in a Cell. After Vengeance, Triple H took a hiatus from WWE due to suffering from minor neck problems.

After a four-month hiatus, Triple H returned to Raw on October 3, where he and Flair defeated Chris Masters and Carlito. After the match, Triple H turned on Flair by attacking him with a sledgehammer, sparking a feud between the duo. Flair defeated Triple H in a steel cage match on November 1 at Taboo Tuesday for Flair's Intercontinental Championship. Subsequently, Triple H defeated Flair in a non-title Last Man Standing match on November 27 at Survivor Series to end their feud.

==== D-Generation X reunion (2006–2007) ====
Triple H failed to win the Royal Rumble match on January 29, 2006, at the Royal Rumble, but another championship opportunity arose for him in the Road to WrestleMania Tournament, which he won, granting him a match for the WWE Championship at WrestleMania 22 on April 2, where he lost to champion John Cena via submission. On April 30 at Backlash, Triple H was involved in another WWE Championship match, fighting Edge and Cena in a triple threat match, where he lost again. Angered at his loss, a bloodied Triple H used his sledgehammer to attack both Edge and Cena and then performed a number of DX crotch chops. Triple H unsuccessfully attempted to win the WWE title from Cena on numerous occasions, blaming his shortcomings on Vince McMahon, which eventually led to a feud between the McMahons and Triple H.

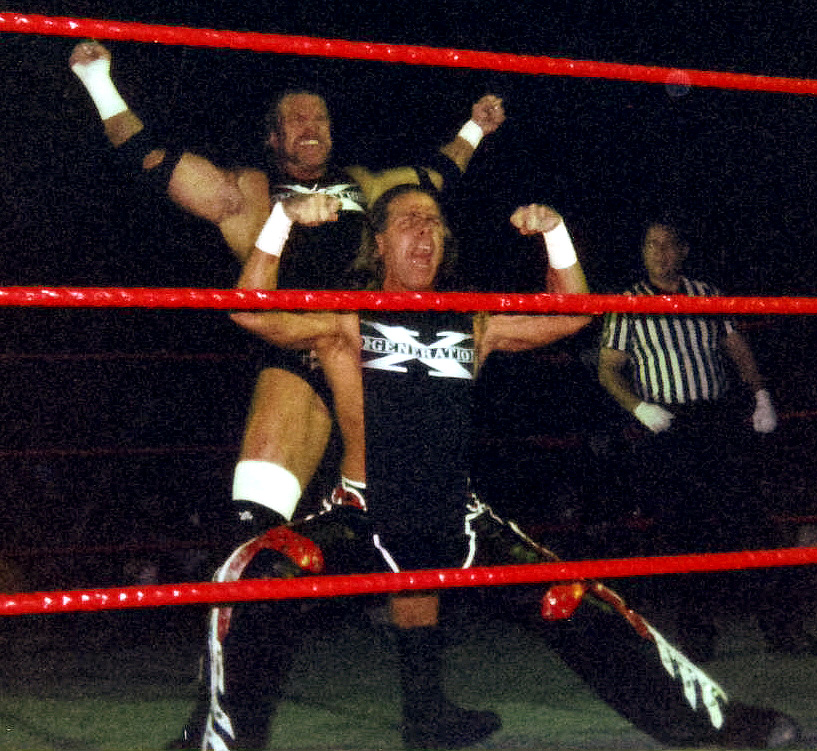
D-X striking their signature pose

Shawn Michaels returned on the June 12 episode of Raw and reunited with Triple H to re-form D-Generation X, turning Triple H face for the first time since 2002. DX defeated The Spirit Squad on June 25 at Vengeance in a 5-on-2 handicap match. They continued their feud with Mr. McMahon, Shane McMahon and The Spirit Squad for several weeks. They then defeated The Spirit Squad again on the July 15, 2006, episode of Saturday Night's Main Event XXXIII in a 5-on-2 elimination match. They then again defeated the McMahons on August 20 at SummerSlam, withstanding the attack of several wrestlers who assaulted them before the match as directed by Mr. McMahon. At Unforgiven on September 17, DX defeated the McMahons and ECW World Champion Big Show in a 3-on-2 handicap Hell in a Cell match. During the match, DX embarrassed Vince by shoving his face in between Big Show's buttocks, and DX won when Triple H broke a sledgehammer over the shoulders of Mr. McMahon after Michaels performed Sweet Chin Music on him.

At Cyber Sunday on November 5, during DX's feud with Rated-RKO (Edge and Randy Orton), special guest referee Eric Bischoff allowed the illegal use of a weapon to give Rated-RKO the win. On November 26 at Survivor Series, DX got their revenge when their team defeated Edge and Orton's team in a clean sweep during their five-on-five elimination match. At New Year's Revolution on January 7, 2007, DX and Rated-RKO fought to a no contest after Triple H suffered a legitimate torn right quadriceps (similar to the one he suffered in 2001 in his other leg) 15 minutes into the match. Surgery was successfully performed two days later by Dr. James Andrews.

==== Multiple WWE Championship reigns (2007–2009) ====
At SummerSlam on August 26, he defeated King Booker in his return match. On October 7 at No Mercy, Triple H was originally scheduled to face Umaga in a singles match. At the start of the night, Triple H challenged newly named WWE Champion Randy Orton, reigniting their feud that had been interrupted following his injury. Triple H won the match, winning his eleventh world championship and sixth WWE Championship, then defended his title against Umaga in his regularly scheduled match after Mr. McMahon declared the match to be for the WWE title. After that, McMahon gave Orton a rematch against Triple H in a Last Man Standing match in the main event, and Triple H lost after an RKO on a broadcast table. Triple H's title reign at No Mercy is the fifth shortest reign in WWE history, only lasting through the duration of the event. After winning the Raw Elimination Chamber match on February 17, 2008, at No Way Out, Triple H gained a WWE Championship match by outlasting five other men, last eliminating Jeff Hardy after a Pedigree on a steel chair. At WrestleMania XXIV on March 30, Orton retained the title in a triple threat match after punting Triple H and pinning John Cena following Triple H's Pedigree on Cena. On April 27 at Backlash, Triple H won the title in a fatal four-way elimination match against Orton, Cena, and John "Bradshaw" Layfield, tying the record for most WWE Championship reigns with The Rock. Triple H retained the title against Orton on May 18 at Judgment Day in a steel cage match and again on June 1 at One Night Stand in a Last Man Standing match. Orton suffered a legitimate collarbone injury during the match, prematurely ending the feud.

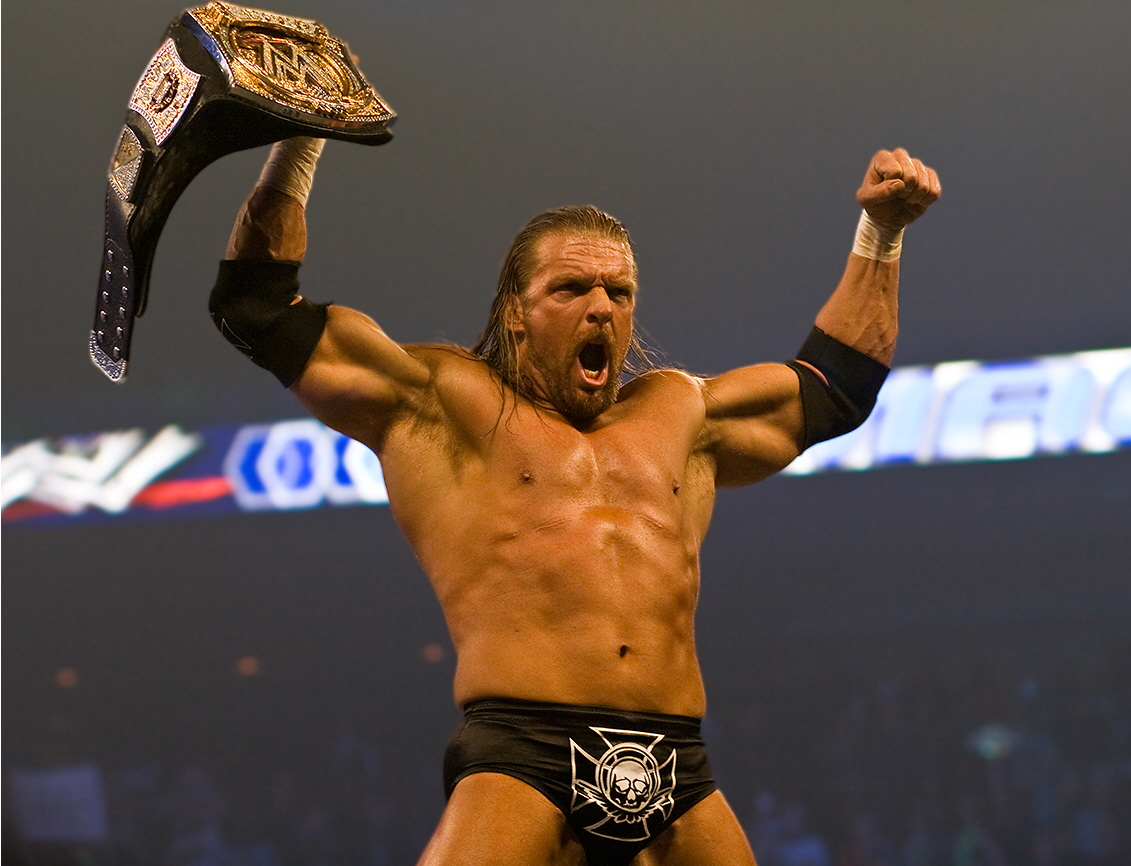
Triple H as WWE Champion in November 2008

On the June 23 episode of Raw, Triple H was drafted to the SmackDown brand as a part of the 2008 WWE draft, in the process making the WWE Championship exclusive to SmackDown. Triple H then went on to defeat John Cena cleanly to retain the WWE Championship on June 29 at Night of Champions. He defended the championship over the summer by defeating the likes of Edge on July 20 at The Great American Bash and The Great Khali on August 17 at SummerSlam, and was the only champion to retain his title at Unforgiven's Championship Scramble matches on September 7. He successfully defended it against Jeff Hardy both on October 5 at No Mercy and Cyber Sunday on October 26.

At Survivor Series on November 23, Triple H was scheduled to defend the title against Vladimir Kozlov and Jeff Hardy, but Hardy was kept out of the match after a scripted attack and injury. During the match, SmackDown general manager Vickie Guerrero announced that Edge had returned and introduced him into the contest. Hardy interfered and hit Triple H with a steel chair meant for Edge, costing him the title after a 210-day reign. After failing to regain the title on December 14 at Armageddon, Triple H entered seventh in the Royal Rumble on January 25, 2009, but was last eliminated by Randy Orton. At No Way Out on February 15, Triple H won the WWE Championship in the SmackDown Elimination Chamber match, setting the record for most reigns at eight. That record stood until 2011 when John Cena won his ninth WWE Championship.

On the February 16 episode of Raw, Triple H made an appearance aiding Stephanie and Shane McMahon, after they were attacked by Orton. On the February 20 episode of SmackDown, Triple H was interviewed by Jim Ross; in the interview, footage was shown highlighting the events that occurred on the February 16 episode of Raw. Ross asked Triple H how he felt seeing that footage, in response, he broke character (after 5 years of marriage) by admitting that Vince McMahon is his father-in-law, that Shane is his brother-in-law, and that Stephanie is his wife, creating a rivalry between Triple H and Orton. On the February 23 episode of Raw, Triple H confronted Orton, before attacking him, Ted DiBiase, and Cody Rhodes (a group known as The Legacy) with a sledgehammer and chasing them from the arena. At WrestleMania 25 on April 5, Triple H defeated Orton to retain the title. On the April 13 episode of Raw, Triple H was drafted back to the Raw brand as part of the 2009 WWE draft, thus bringing the WWE Championship back to Raw. He teamed with Shane McMahon and Batista against Orton and The Legacy in a six-man tag match for the WWE Championship on April 26 at Backlash, which they lost after Orton pinned Triple H. He lost a Three Stages of Hell title match to Orton on June 28 at The Bash. At Night of Champions on July 26, he again lost a title match to Orton in a triple threat match involving John Cena.

==== Third run with D-Generation X (2009–2010) ====
On the August 10 episode of Raw, Triple H met with Michaels at an office cafeteria in Texas where Michaels was working as a chef; throughout the show, Triple H tried to convince Michaels to return to WWE from hiatus. After several incidents (including grease grill burgers on fire and Michaels shouting at a little girl), Michaels agreed to team with Triple H to face The Legacy at SummerSlam, superkicked the girl, and quit his chef job. On the August 17 episode of Raw, Triple H and Michaels officially reunited as DX, but as they were in the process of their in-ring promo, The Legacy attacked them both. Their first match after reuniting was against The Legacy at SummerSlam on August 23, which they won. On September 13 at Breaking Point, they lost to The Legacy in the first ever Submissions Count Anywhere match in WWE history.

At Hell in a Cell on October 4, DX defeated The Legacy in a Hell in a Cell match. DX unsuccessfully challenged John Cena for the WWE Championship in a triple threat match on November 22 at Survivor Series, after which they remained friends and partners. On December 13 at TLC: Tables, Ladders and Chairs, DX defeated Jeri-Show (Chris Jericho and Big Show) to win the Unified WWE Tag Team Championship in a Tables, Ladders, and Chairs match.

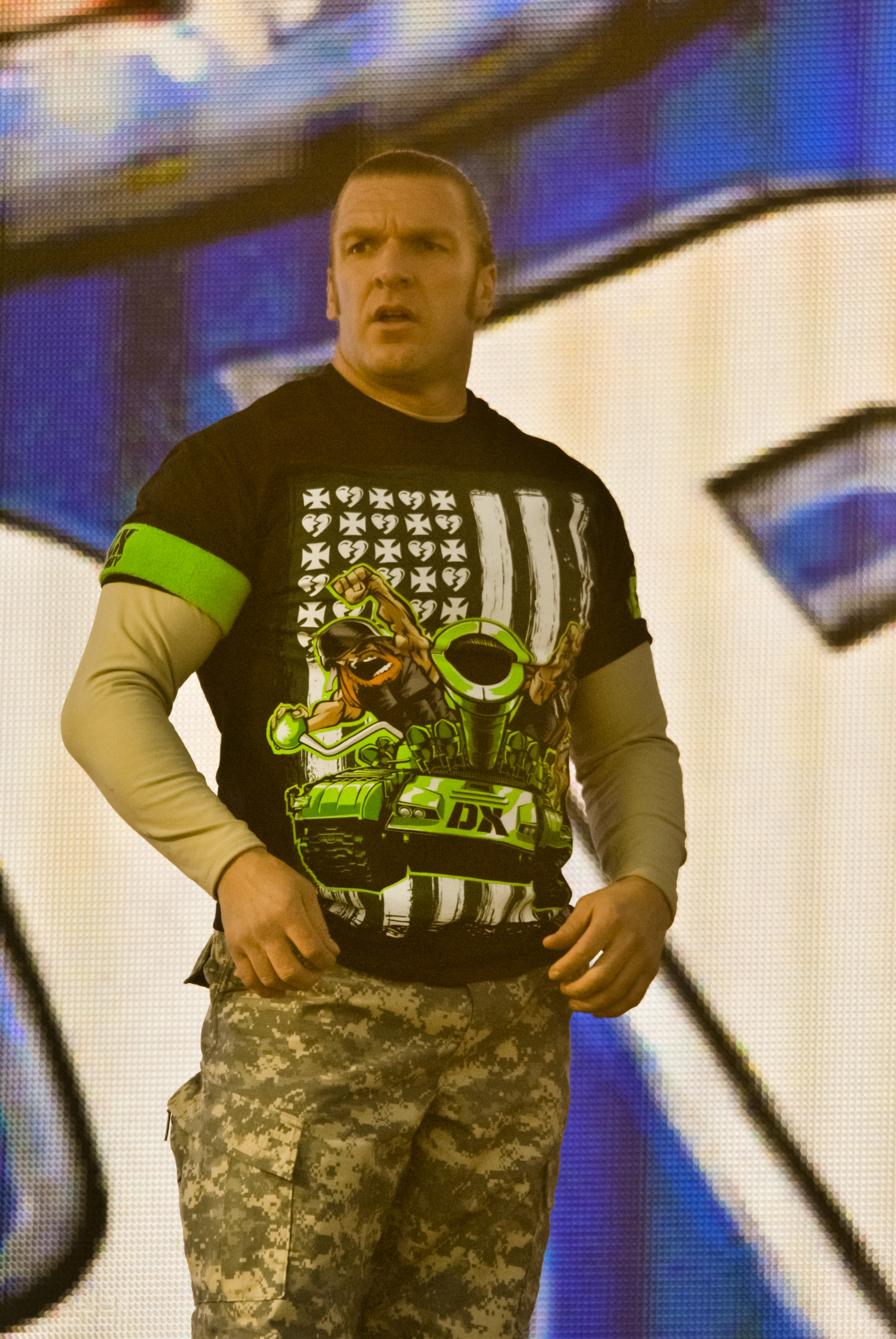
Triple H at the Tribute to the Troops in December 2010

On December 21, Triple H announced that Hornswoggle was the new DX mascot. This came about after Hornswoggle sued DX for emotional and physical distress due to them not allowing him to join DX. After being taken to court where they were ruled guilty by a jury and judge consisting of dwarves, Michaels told Triple H that Hornswoggle could be the mascot. Triple H agreed to it only if the charges were dropped, which Hornswoggle agreed to. On the January 11, 2010, episode of Raw, Mike Tyson, who was the Raw guest host for the night, teamed with Jericho to face DX; at the end of the bout, Tyson turned on Jericho and aligned himself with Triple H and Michaels. On the February 8 episode of Raw, DX lost the Unified Tag Team Championship to ShoMiz (The Miz and Big Show) in a triple threat elimination tag match, also involving The Straight Edge Society (CM Punk and Luke Gallows). On the March 1 episode of Raw, they lost a rematch for the titles in their last televised match before Michaels retired.

On February 21, Triple H eliminated then WWE Champion Sheamus from the Elimination Chamber match, though he did not win the title. Sheamus attacked him weeks later, setting up a match at WrestleMania XXVI on March 28, which Triple H won. Also at WrestleMania, Michaels lost to The Undertaker and was forced to retire. While giving a farewell speech the next night, Sheamus attacked him and set up a rematch at Extreme Rules on April 25. Sheamus attacked Triple H at the start of the show, before later winning the match, after which Triple H took a long hiatus from the WWE. Triple H made an untelevised appearance on October 30 at the WWE Fan Appreciation Event and also at the 2010 Tribute to the Troops.

==== Chief Operating Officer (2011–2013) ====
On the February 21, 2011, episode of Raw, Triple H returned, interrupting the return of The Undertaker and challenging him to a match at WrestleMania XXVII, which later became a No Holds Barred match. A week later, he attacked Sheamus with a Pedigree through a broadcast table in retaliation for Sheamus giving him a ten-month injury. At WrestleMania XXVII on April 3, Triple H lost, which extended The Undertaker's undefeated streak to 19–0; The Undertaker was carried from the ring on a stretcher whereas Triple H left on his own accord.

At the end of the July 18 episode of Raw, Triple H returned on behalf of WWE's board of directors to relieve his father-in-law Vince McMahon of his duties. This was followed by the announcement that he had been assigned to take over as Chief Operating Officer (COO) of the WWE. This was during a storyline where CM Punk had won the WWE Championship and left the company. Though a new champion was crowned, Triple H helped re-sign Punk and upheld both championship reigns. He announced he would referee a match to unify both WWE Championships on August 14 at SummerSlam. Although he counted a pinfall for CM Punk to win, John Cena's leg was on the ropes, which would break the pin. Regardless, Triple H's longtime friend Kevin Nash attacked Punk immediately after the match to allow Alberto Del Rio to become the new champion. Though Nash and Punk demanded a match against each other, Triple H fired Nash for insubordination and booked himself in a No Disqualification match on September 18 at Night of Champions with his position of COO on the line. Triple H defeated Punk at Night of Champions despite interference from John Laurinaitis, Nash, The Miz and R-Truth. After repeated attacks from these wrestlers in various matches, the majority of WWE's on-screen staff gave Triple H a vote of no confidence. Mr. McMahon returned to relieve him of his duties on the October 10 episode of Raw SuperShow, though he remained the COO. Laurinaitis was named interim general manager of Raw, and booked him and Punk in a tag team match against The Miz and R-Truth on October 23 at Vengeance. During the match, Nash once again attacked him (costing Triple H and Punk the match) and did so the following night on the October 24 episode of Raw SuperShow, hospitalizing him (kayfabe). WWE later announced that Triple H had sustained a fractured vertebra, and would be out of action. He returned on December 12, as part of the Slammy Awards. On December 18, he defeated Nash at TLC: Tables, Ladders, and Chairs in sledgehammer ladder match, after attacking him with a sledgehammer.

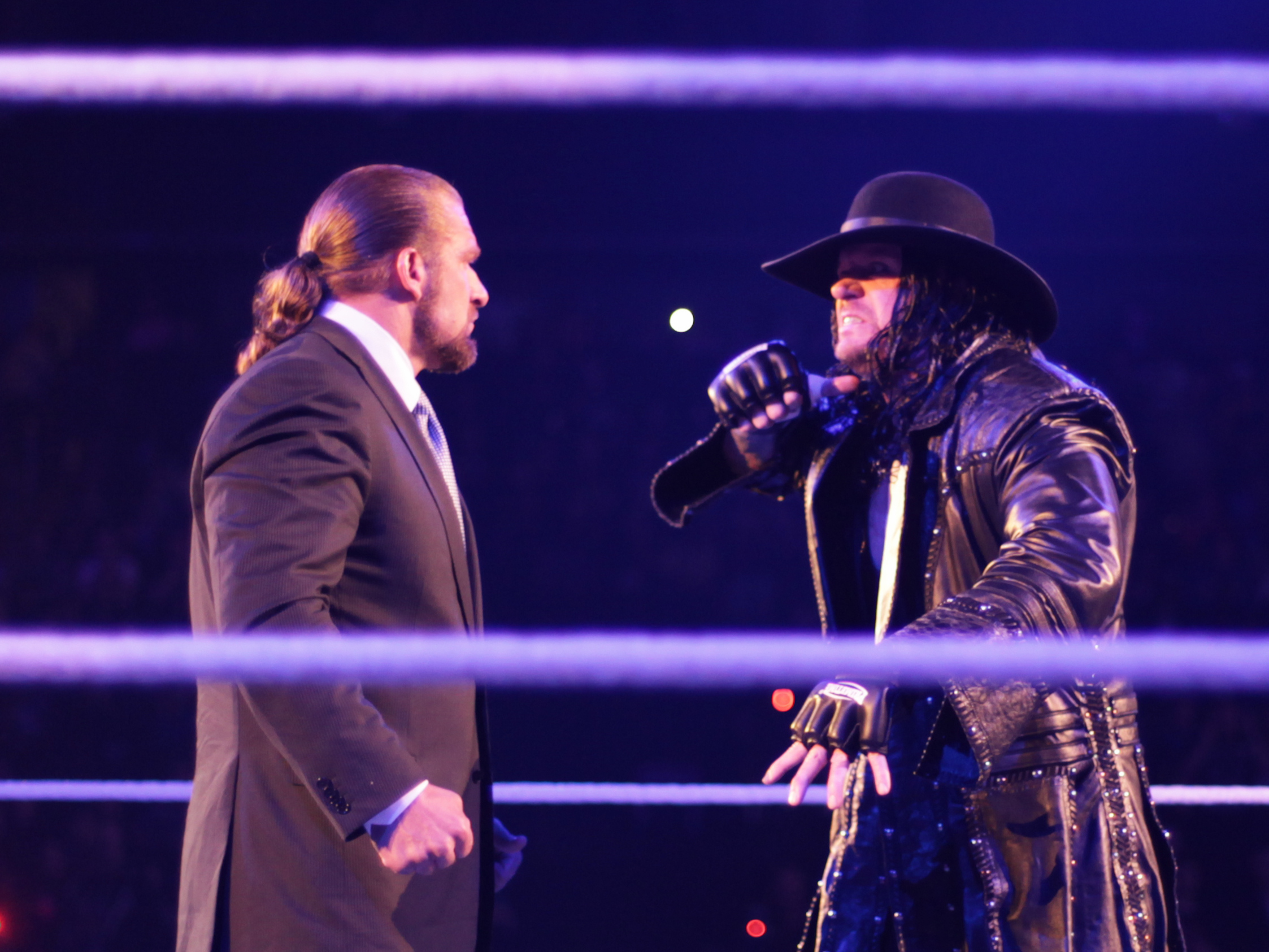
Triple H being taunted by The Undertaker ahead of their second consecutive WrestleMania match

Triple H returned on the January 30, 2012, episode of Raw SuperShow to evaluate Laurinaitis' performance as general manager. Before he could announce the decision, he was interrupted by the returning Undertaker. After initially refusing the rematch as he did not want to tarnish The Undertaker's legacy, Triple H accepted the challenge after being called a coward who lives in Shawn Michaels' shadow, on the condition their rematch be contested inside Hell in a Cell. Triple H went on to lose this match on April 1 at WrestleMania XXVIII.

Triple H returned on the April 30 episode of Raw SuperShow, when he refused to give in to Brock Lesnar's unreasonable contract demands, resulting in Lesnar attacking him and storyline breaking his arm. Upon his return two weeks later, Triple H was confronted by Lesnar's legal representative, Paul Heyman, who announced Lesnar was filing a lawsuit against WWE for breach of contract. After he accosted Heyman, Heyman threatened another lawsuit against Triple H for assault and battery. At No Way Out on June 17, Triple H challenged a non-present Lesnar to a match at SummerSlam, which Heyman refused on Lesnar's behalf the following night on Raw SuperShow. At Raw 1000, Stephanie McMahon goaded Heyman into Triple H's challenge against Lesnar. To anger Triple H, Lesnar broke Michaels's arm on the August 13 episode of Raw. Six days later at SummerSlam, Triple H lost to Lesnar after submitting to the Kimura Lock, breaking his arm again in storyline.

Triple H returned on the February 25, 2013, episode of Raw, brawling with Brock Lesnar after he attempted to attack Mr. McMahon. The brawl resulted in Lesnar having his head legitimately split open and requiring 18 stitches. The following week, Triple H issued a challenge to Lesnar, requesting a rematch with him at WrestleMania 29 on April 7, which Lesnar accepted on the condition that he could choose the stipulation. The following week, after Triple H signed the contract and assaulted Heyman, the stipulation was revealed as No Holds Barred with Triple H's career on the line. Triple H defeated Lesnar after a Pedigree onto the steel steps. On May 19 at Extreme Rules, Triple H lost to Lesnar in a steel cage match after interference from Heyman, and also injured his jaw.

The next night on Raw, Triple H wrestled Heyman's newest client, Curtis Axel. He suffered a storyline concussion and was deemed to have forfeited. Despite being medically cleared to wrestle before the June 3 episode of Raw, Vince and Stephanie McMahon did not allow Triple H to wrestle Axel, citing concerns for his well-being and the safety of his children. In response, Triple H stormed out the arena and vowed to return to the ring the next week on Raw.

==== The Authority (2013–2016) ====
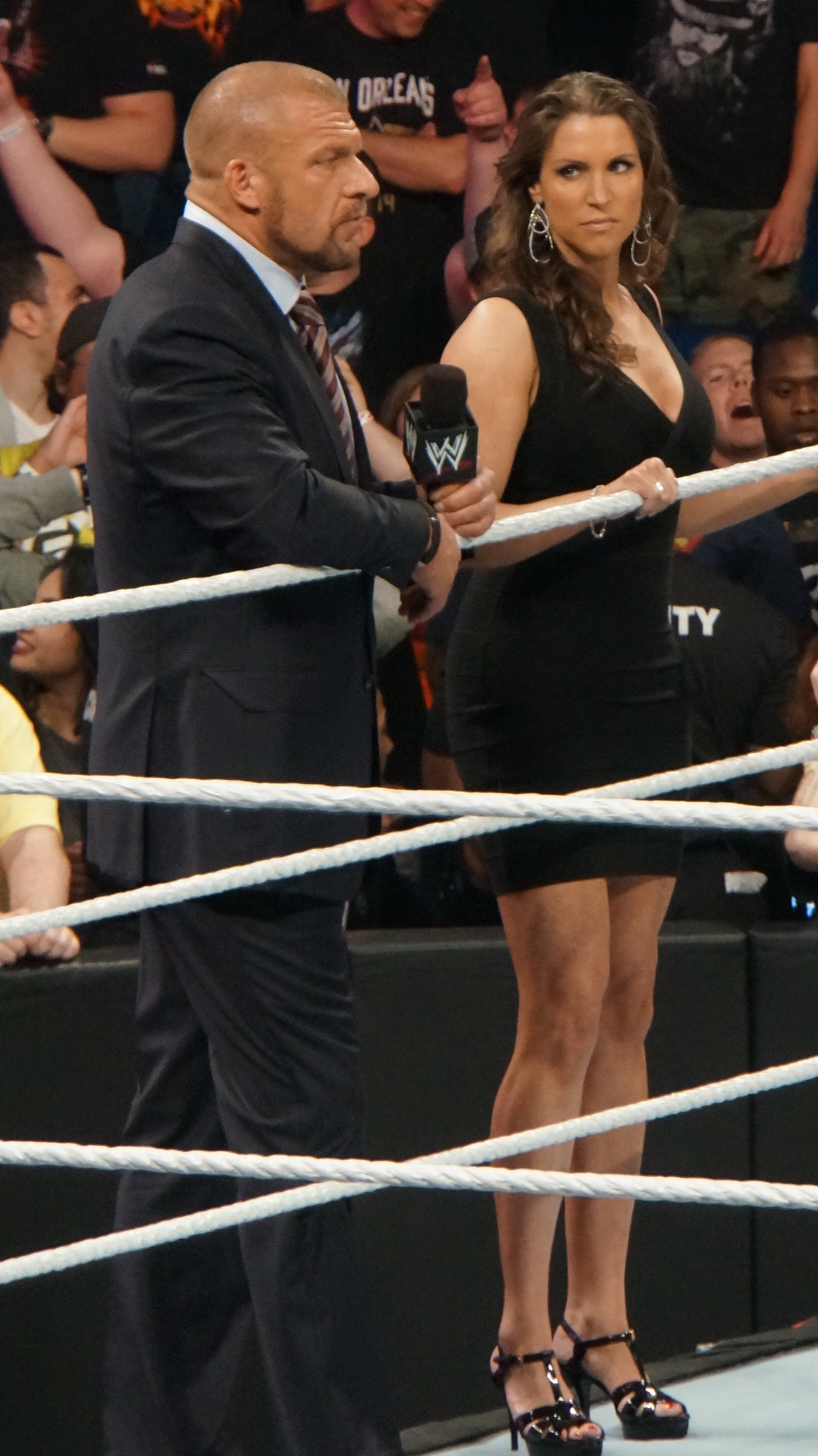
Triple H and Stephanie McMahon as The Authority

On August 18 at SummerSlam, Triple H served as the special guest referee for the WWE Championship match between champion John Cena and Daniel Bryan. After Bryan won the match, Triple H attacked him, allowing Randy Orton to cash in his Money in the Bank contract and win the title, turning heel for the first time since 2006. Along with his wife Stephanie, they subsequently created The Authority, with The Shield (Seth Rollins, Roman Reigns and Dean Ambrose) as his enforcers, Kane as the Director of Operations and Orton as their hand-picked WWE Champion.

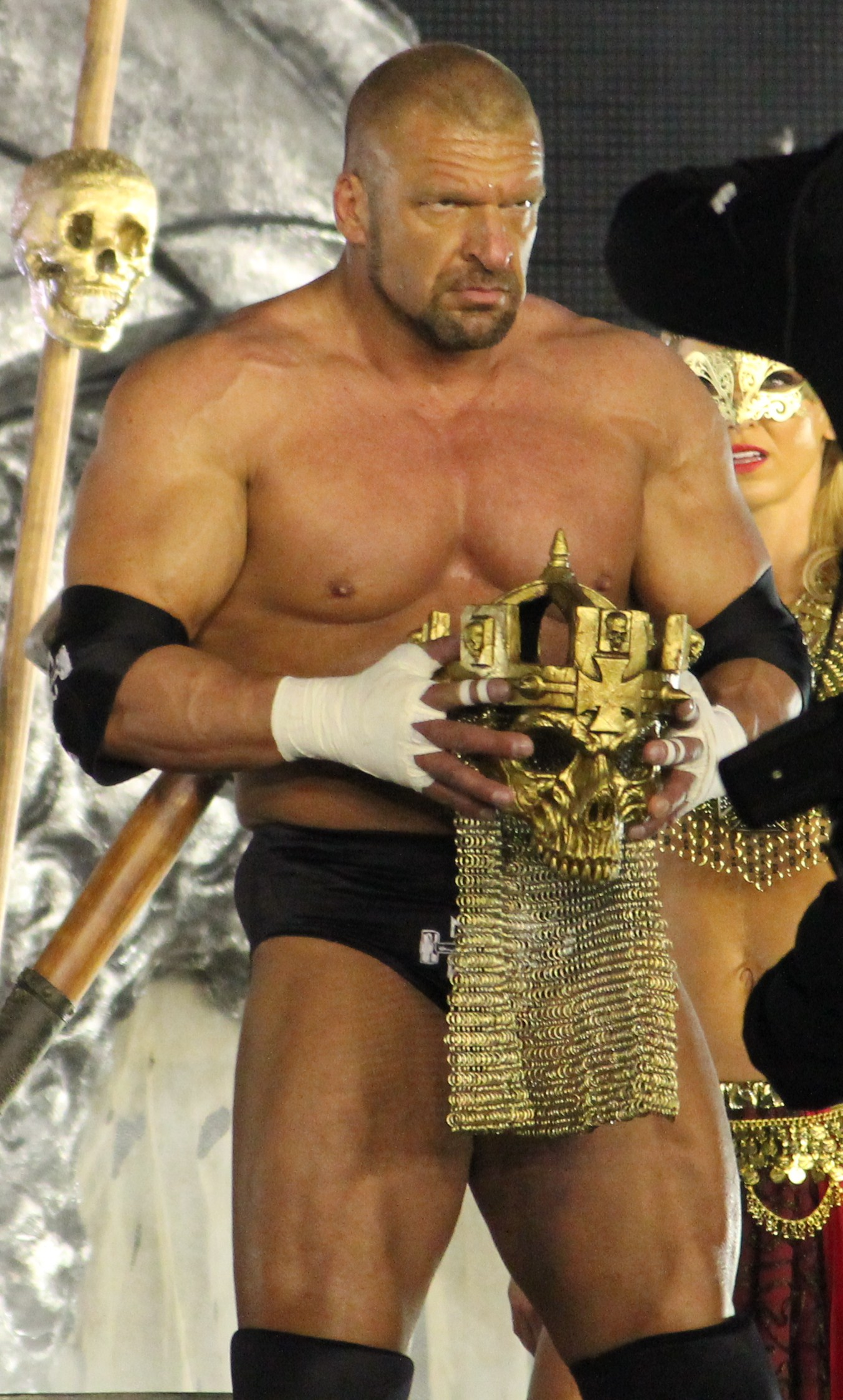
Triple H making his entrance at WrestleMania XXX

At WrestleMania XXX on April 6, 2014, Triple H lost to Bryan, thereby granting Bryan a part in the subsequent WWE World Heavyweight Championship match against Batista and Orton, which Bryan ultimately won. In order to end Bryan's title reign, Triple H re-formed Evolution with Orton and Batista on the April 18 episode of SmackDown, but Bryan remained champion due to The Shield turning on The Authority. Evolution subsequently lost back-to-back matches with The Shield on May 4 at Extreme Rules and on June 1 at Payback. Batista quit WWE on the Raw after Payback after Triple H refused to grant him his shot at the WWE World Heavyweight Championship. Triple H then went to "Plan B", Seth Rollins, who turned on The Shield and rejoined The Authority.

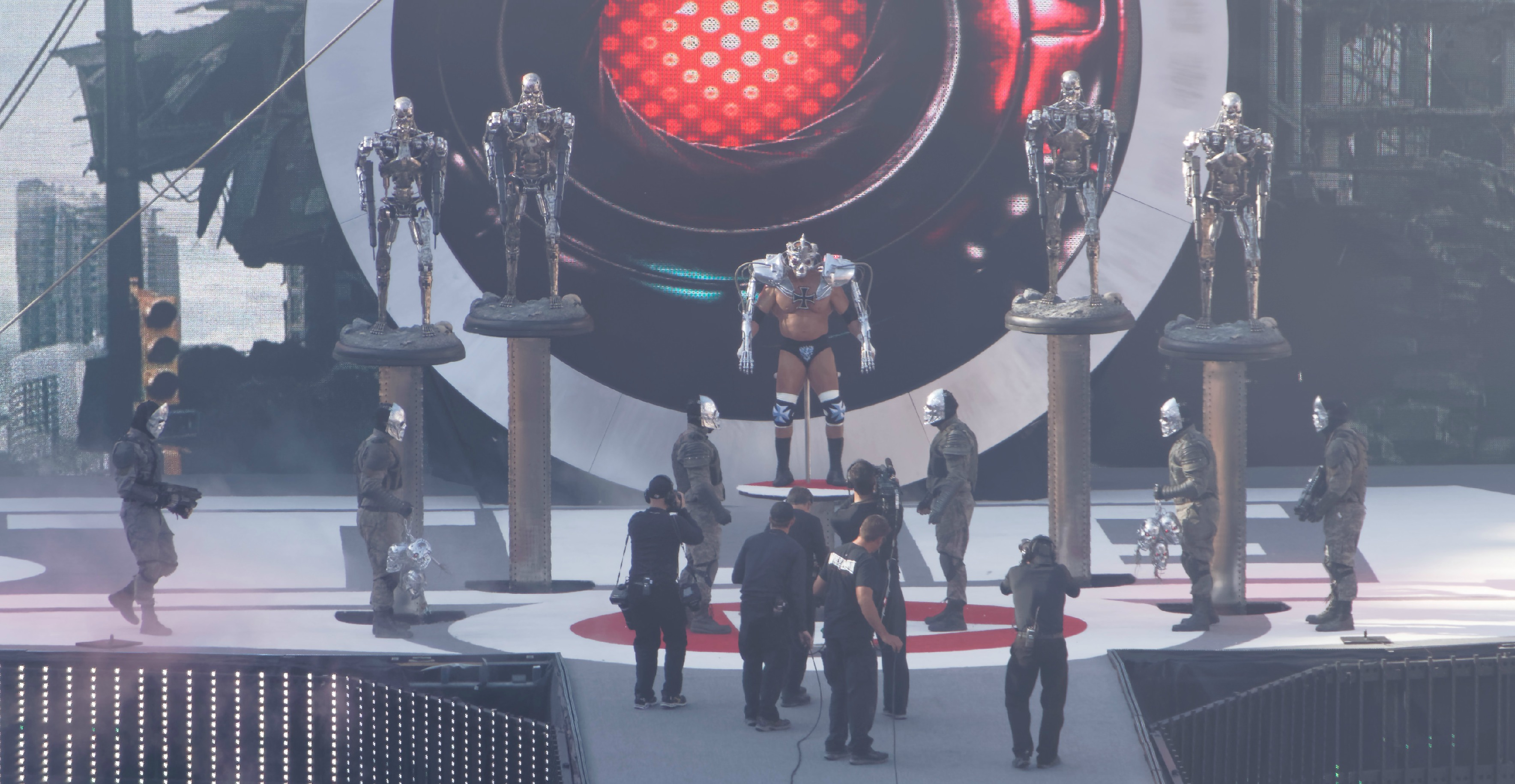
Triple H making his Terminator Genisys inspired entrance at WrestleMania 31

The Authority were briefly removed from power after losing a five-on-five tag team elimination match on November 23 at Survivor Series after Sting made his WWE debut to assist their opponents. However, The Authority were reinstated on the December 29 episode of Raw after Rollins coaxed Cena into reinstating them by holding Edge hostage. Back in power, Triple H began feuding with Sting, whom he defeated in a no disqualification match on March 29, 2015, at WrestleMania 31 after interference from D-Generation X. After his match with Sting, he and Stephanie McMahon were later confronted by The Rock and Ronda Rousey during a promo regarding the record crowd at the event.

The WWE World Heavyweight Championship was vacated after Rollins suffered a legitimate severe knee injury in November 2015 and a tournament to determine a new champion was held at Survivor Series on November 22, which was won by Roman Reigns. Throughout the remainder of 2015, The Authority aligned with Sheamus, who successfully cashed in his Money in the Bank contact immediately after Reigns' victory. After Sheamus defeated Reigns at TLC: Tables, Ladders & Chairs on December 13, Reigns viciously attacked Triple H, which resulted in a storyline injury that took him off television. During this hiatus, Reigns regained the championship from Sheamus on the following episode of Raw.

On January 24, 2016, Triple H made his return during the Royal Rumble match for the WWE World Heavyweight Championship as the unannounced 30th entrant. After eliminating Reigns, he then eliminated Dean Ambrose to secure his second Royal Rumble win and 14th (and final) world championship. He successfully defended the championship against Ambrose on March 12 at Roadblock, but lost it to Reigns in the main event of WrestleMania 32 on April 3, ending his last world championship reign at 70 days. After WrestleMania 32, with The Authority now disbanded, Triple H competed in the WWE Live tour of the United Kingdom in late April before taking a hiatus from WWE television. However, he continued making occasional appearances in an executive role for NXT.

==== Final feuds and retirement (2016–2022) ====
On the August 29 episode of Raw, Triple H made his return by interfering in the main event for the recently vacated and established WWE Universal Championship. Firstly, he attacked rival Roman Reigns with a Pedigree, allowing former Authority stable member Seth Rollins to eliminate him, before attacking Rollins with a Pedigree, allowing Kevin Owens to win the title. This began a feud with Rollins, which culminated in a "non-sanctioned match" at WrestleMania 33 on April 2, 2017, where Rollins defeated Triple H.

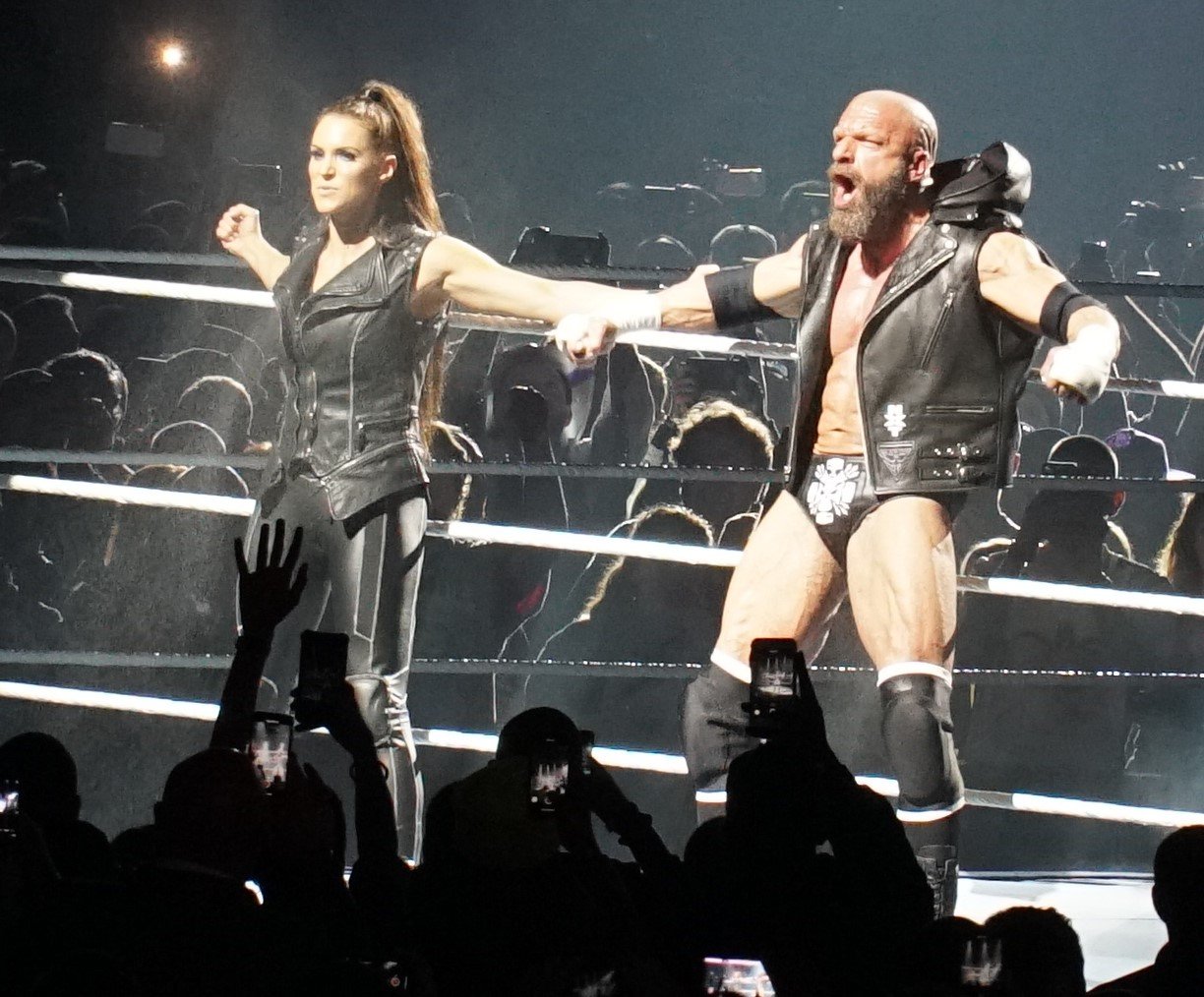
Triple H with his wife Stephanie McMahon at WrestleMania 34

Despite being part of Kurt Angle's Team Raw on November 19 at Survivor Series, Triple H attacked him and caused him to be eliminated in their match against Team SmackDown, and he ultimately got credit for winning the match after he pinned Shane McMahon of Team SmackDown. Angle subsequently joined forces with the debuting Ronda Rousey, and the two defeated Triple H and Stephanie McMahon in a mixed tag match at WrestleMania 34 on April 8, 2018, after Stephanie submitted to Rousey's armbar.

Triple H turned face again for the first time since 2013 and his final feuds were high-profile rematches with wrestlers that he had previously worked with. On April 27 at the Greatest Royal Rumble in Jeddah, Saudi Arabia, John Cena defeated Triple H in the first match ever featured on a Saudi pay-per-view event. He subsequently defeated The Undertaker on October 6 at Super Show-Down in a match that was billed as the "Last Time Ever". His feud with The Undertaker continued into Crown Jewel on November 2, where Shawn Michaels came out of retirement to reform DX with him, in a winning effort against The Brothers of Destruction (The Undertaker and Kane). At WrestleMania 35 on April 7, 2019, Triple H defeated Batista with assistance from Ric Flair in what was Batista's retirement match. His final match on pay-per-view was a loss to Randy Orton at Super ShowDown on June 7. Triple H's final house show match took place on June 29 in Tokyo, Japan, where he and Shinsuke Nakamura defeated Robert Roode and Samoa Joe in a tag team match after Nakamura pinned Roode.

Triple H's appearances became increasingly sporadic and 2020 became the first year in which he did not wrestle a match since the start of his career. However, he continued to make occasional on-screen appearances in non-wrestling roles, including on the April 24 episode of SmackDown, which was dedicated to his 25th anniversary in WWE. The final match of his career took place on the January 11, 2021, episode of Raw when he faced Orton in an "unsanctioned fight", but after Alexa Bliss and "The Fiend" Bray Wyatt got involved, Bliss attacked Orton with a fireball causing the match to end in no-contest.

In September 2021, Triple H suffered from heart failure and an ICD was installed in his chest. Due to his newly discovered heart condition, Triple H announced his retirement from wrestling during an appearance on First Take on March 25, 2022. On April 3, he introduced the second night of WrestleMania 38 as the COO of WWE, subsequently leaving a microphone and his wrestling boots in the ring to signify his official in-ring retirement. He later expressed a sense of being at peace with his forced retirement, stating that he "did everything [he] wanted to do and then some".

==== Post-retirement and corporate roles (2022–present) ====
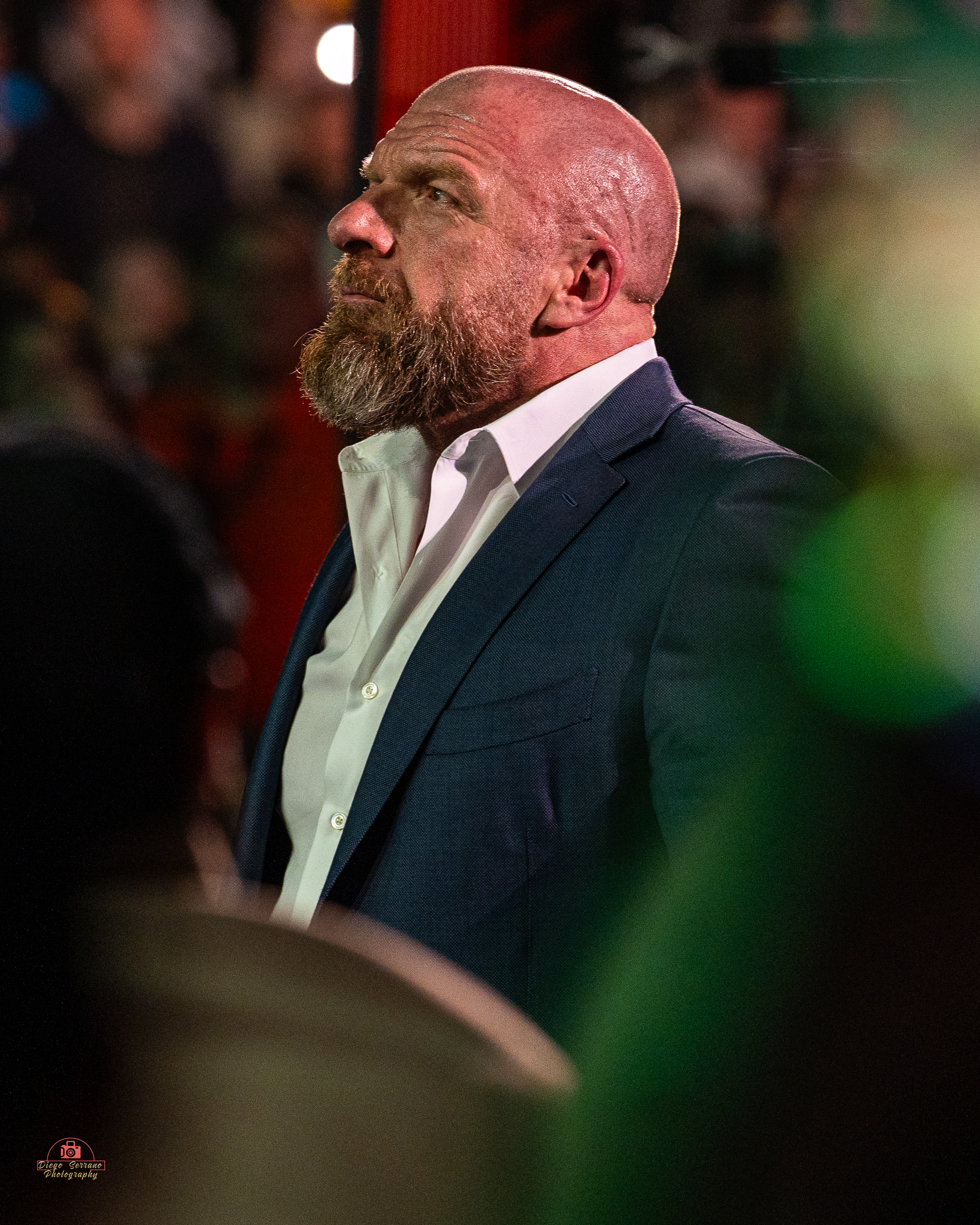
Triple H in April 2024

On September 6, 2022, WWE announced that Levesque had been promoted to chief content officer of the company. Levesque maintained this role after WWE was acquired by Endeavor (now the WME Group) the following year. Since his retirement, he has continued to make appearances at post-show press conferences in his chief content officer role, and in storylines, typically acting as an on-screen authority figure under his real name and ring name.

== Legacy in wrestling ==
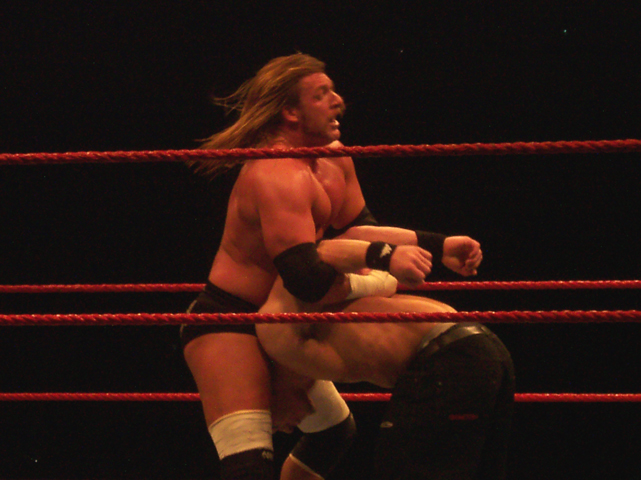
Triple H setting up the Pedigree on John Cena in October 2005

Triple H received acclaim for his work as a villain throughout his career. In 2011, the Pro Wrestling Torch stated that he was "widely regarded as the best wrestler in North America" by 2000. His WrestleMania matches against Chris Benoit and Shawn Michaels at WrestleMania XX, John Cena at WrestleMania 22, Cena and Randy Orton at WrestleMania XXIV, The Undertaker at both WrestleMania XXVII and WrestleMania XXVIII, and Daniel Bryan at WrestleMania XXX have been considered among Triple H's best WrestleMania matches and some of the best matches in WrestleMania history.

Triple H's later career, especially after 2014 during which he was a part-time performer, has been sometimes criticized. Bret Hart commented on Triple H winning the 2016 Royal Rumble match for the WWE World Heavyweight Championship while not wrestling full-time, saying: "I didn't like the decision that Triple H, surprise, put the belt on himself again ... it just showed a real lack of imagination if you ask me." Triple H using his relationship with the McMahon family to continually dominate the spotlight and book himself in high-profile matches has been a subject of criticism since his full-time career ended. After his tag team match along with Michaels against Undertaker and Kane at Crown Jewel in 2018, Wade Keller from Pro Wrestling Torch wrote that Triple H "moves like the trees in Wizard of Oz". Jason Powell from Pro Wrestling Dot Net stated that wrestlers like Triple H, alongside Michaels, Undertaker, and Kane, "need to accept their limitations, stop pretending they belong in main events, and stop acting like being in these main events isn't stealing the spotlight (from newer talent)". Triple H has also been criticized for allegedly abusing his influence within WWE from the early to mid-2000s to have himself inserted into high-profile angles, or to have match or feud finishes changed in his favor.

As the founder and executive producer of NXT since its inception in 2012, Levesque has been widely praised for helping cultivate the brand, recruiting fresh new talent, and helping guide the brand to various levels of success including sold-out shows, increased respect for women's professional wrestling, international expansion, and critically acclaimed matches.

== Business career ==
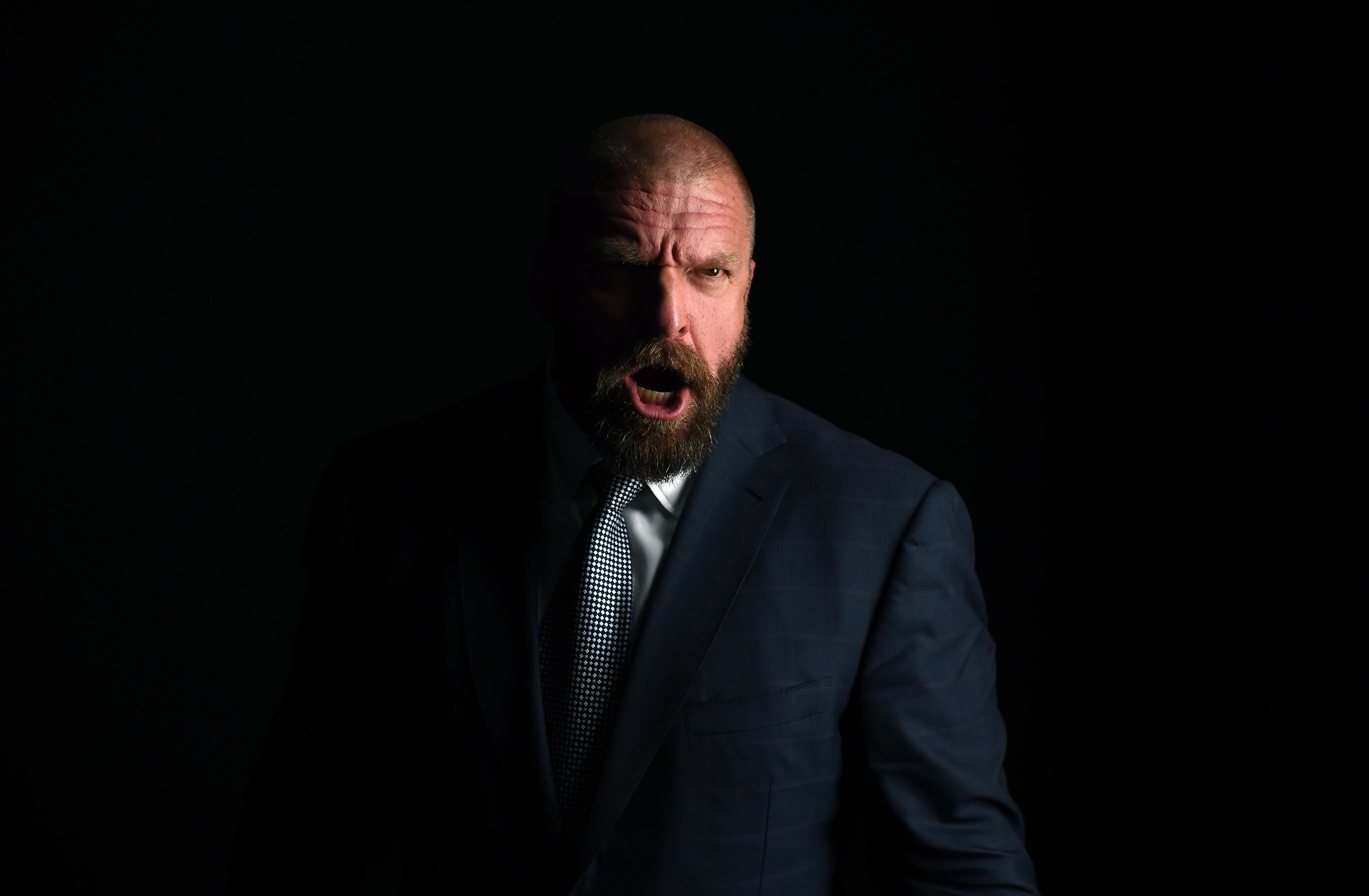
Levesque backstage at the 2017 Web Summit, performing the "Are you ready?" catchphrase, which by this point was associated with NXT

In 2010, Levesque's role in WWE as an Executive Senior Advisor was officially formalized as he was given an office at the company's headquarters in Stamford, Connecticut. He was named Executive Vice-President of Talent and Live Events in 2011. In 2013, his title was elevated to Executive Vice-President of Talent, Live Events, and Creative, which led him to work on storylines with WWE's creative team. That year, he earned a combined salary of approximately $1.5 million from his front office job and as a wrestler. He also owned just over $1.5 million in WWE stock at the time.

In 2020, Levesque was named WWE's Executive Vice-President of Global Talent Strategy and Development. In this role, he oversaw the company's Talent Development department and served as a senior advisor to the CEO for talent strategy. He also founded and executive produced WWE's NXT brand since 2014, though he has not been involved with the brand's "NXT 2.0" overhaul from September 2021 onwards.

On July 22, 2022, WWE promoted Levesque to Executive Vice-President of Talent Relations. Three days later, following the retirement of his father-in-law and WWE CEO Vince McMahon, he was also named Head of WWE Creative. On September 2, he was named chief content officer. This role entails overseeing the company's creative writing, talent relations, live events, talent development, and creative services departments.

On October 15, 2023, it was announced that Endeavor CEO Ari Emanuel had removed McMahon from WWE creative power and tasked Levesque with leading "99.9% of the creative" moving forward.

== Philanthropy ==
In 2014, Levesque and his wife Stephanie created the Connor's Cure cancer fund in honor of Connor "The Crusher" Michalek, a WWE fan who died of cancer at the age of eight, which has now raised nearly $4.5 million to fund research grants and provide family assistance in battling pediatric cancer.

== Personal life ==
From 1996 to 2000, Levesque was in a relationship with fellow wrestler Joan "Chyna" Laurer. What began as an on-screen storyline marriage in 2000 became a real-life romance when Levesque began dating Stephanie McMahon. They were married in Sleepy Hollow, New York, on October 25, 2003. They have three children, born in 2006, 2008, and 2010.

Levesque is an avid fan of Motörhead, who performed three original entrance themes for him over the course of his career, and was good friends with the band's frontman Lemmy until Lemmy's death in December 2015. He sported Lemmy-inspired facial hair during a portion of his career and spoke at Lemmy's funeral on January 9, 2016. He is also a supporter of English football team West Ham United.

In September 2021, WWE reported that Levesque underwent a procedure at Yale New Haven Hospital following a "cardiac event" caused by a genetic heart issue. During an appearance on First Take on March 25, 2022, Levesque gave his first interview since being hospitalized. He revealed that he had viral pneumonia and inflamed lungs, which worsened over time. He said that Stephanie noticed he was coughing up blood, and doctors subsequently discovered fluid in his lungs and around his heart; they informed him that his heart was working at a fraction of its full strength and that he was in a "bad" state of heart failure. He also said there were moments where he thought he would die and confirmed that the event forced his retirement: "I was nose-diving and sort of at the one-yard line of where you don't want to be really, for your family and your future. [...] I will never wrestle again. First of all, I have a defibrillator in my chest, which, you know, probably not a good idea for me to get zapped on live TV."

In 2025, Levesque was appointed to the President's Council on Sports, Fitness, and Nutrition. He serves as the council's vice chair.

== Other media ==
According to the Wrestling Figure Checklist, Levesque had 412 action figures produced of his likeness between the 1990s and 2010s. The majority of these were produced by Jakks Pacific and Mattel, making Levesque one of the most produced wrestlers in history.

In 2004, Levesque released the book Making the Game: Triple H's Approach to a Better Body. It is mostly devoted to bodybuilding advice with some autobiographical information, memoirs, and opinions.

Levesque wrote his own chapter giving advice in entrepreneur Tim Ferriss' 2016 book Tools of Titans. He also wrote a short story for The Amazing Spider-Man #1000 comic book in 2026.

== Filmography ==
=== Film ===
Year	Title	Role	Notes
2004	Blade: Trinity	Jarko Grimwood	
2006	Relative Strangers	Wrestler	Uncredited
2011	The Chaperone	Raymond "Ray Ray" Bradstone	
2011	Inside Out	Arlo "AJ" Jayne	
2014	Scooby-Doo! WrestleMania Mystery	Himself	Voice
2014	WWE Power Series	Himself	
2016	Scooby-Doo! and WWE: Curse of the Speed Demon	Himself	Voice
2017	Surf's Up 2: WaveMania	Hunter	Voice

=== Television ===
Year	Title	Role	Notes
1998	Pacific Blue	Triple H	1 episode
1998	The Drew Carey Show	The Disciplinarian	1 episode
2000	Grown Ups	Cameron Russell	1 episode
2001	The Weakest Link	Himself	1 episode
2001	MADtv	Triple H	1 episode
2005	The Bernie Mac Show	Triple H	1 episode
2009	Robot Chicken	Triple H / Werewolf (voice)	1 episode
2023	Billions	Himself	1 episode

=== Video games ===
Year	Title	Notes
1996	WWF In Your House	Video game debut
1998	WWF War Zone	
1999	WWF Attitude	Cover athlete
1999	WWF WrestleMania 2000	Cover athlete
2000	WWF SmackDown!	
2000	WWF Royal Rumble	Cover athlete
2000	WWF No Mercy	Cover athlete
2000	WWF SmackDown! 2: Know Your Role	Cover athlete
2001	WWF With Authority!	Cover athlete
2001	WWF Betrayal	Cover athlete
2001	WWF Road to WrestleMania	
2001	WWF SmackDown! Just Bring It	Cover athlete
2002	WWF Raw	Cover athlete
2002	WWE WrestleMania X8	
2002	WWE Road to WrestleMania X8	Cover athlete
2002	WWE SmackDown! Shut Your Mouth	Cover athlete
2003	WWE Crush Hour	
2003	WWE WrestleMania XIX	
2003	WWE Raw 2	Cover athlete
2003	WWE SmackDown! Here Comes the Pain	
2004	WWE Day of Reckoning	Cover athlete
2004	WWE Survivor Series	
2004	WWE SmackDown! vs. Raw	
2005	WWE WrestleMania 21	
2005	WWE Aftershock	
2005	WWE Day of Reckoning 2	Cover athlete
2005	WWE SmackDown! vs. Raw 2006	
2006	WWE SmackDown vs. Raw 2007	Cover athlete
2007	WWE SmackDown vs. Raw 2008	
2008	WWE SmackDown vs. Raw 2009	Cover athlete
2009	WWE Legends of WrestleMania	
2009	WWE SmackDown vs. Raw 2010	
2010	WWE SmackDown vs. Raw 2011	
2011	WWE All Stars	
2011	WWE '12	
2012	WWE WrestleFest	
2012	WWE '13	
2013	WWE 2K14	
2014	WWE SuperCard	
2014	WWE 2K15	
2015	WWE Immortals	
2015	WWE 2K	
2015	WWE 2K16	
2016	WWE 2K17	
2017	WWE Champions	
2017	WWE Tap Mania	
2017	WWE 2K18	
2017	WWE Mayhem	
2018	WWE 2K19	
2019	WWE Universe	
2019	WWE 2K20	
2020	WWE 2K Battlegrounds	
2020	WWE Undefeated	
2022	WWE 2K22	
2023	WWE 2K23	
2024	WWE 2K24	
2025	WWE 2K25	
2026	WWE 2K26	

== Bibliography ==
- Making the Game: Triple H's Approach to a Better Body. Paul Levesque; Robert Caprio (2006). WWE Books.
- The Unauthorized History of DX. Triple H; Shawn Michaels; Aaron Williams (2009). WWE Books.

== Championships and accomplishments ==
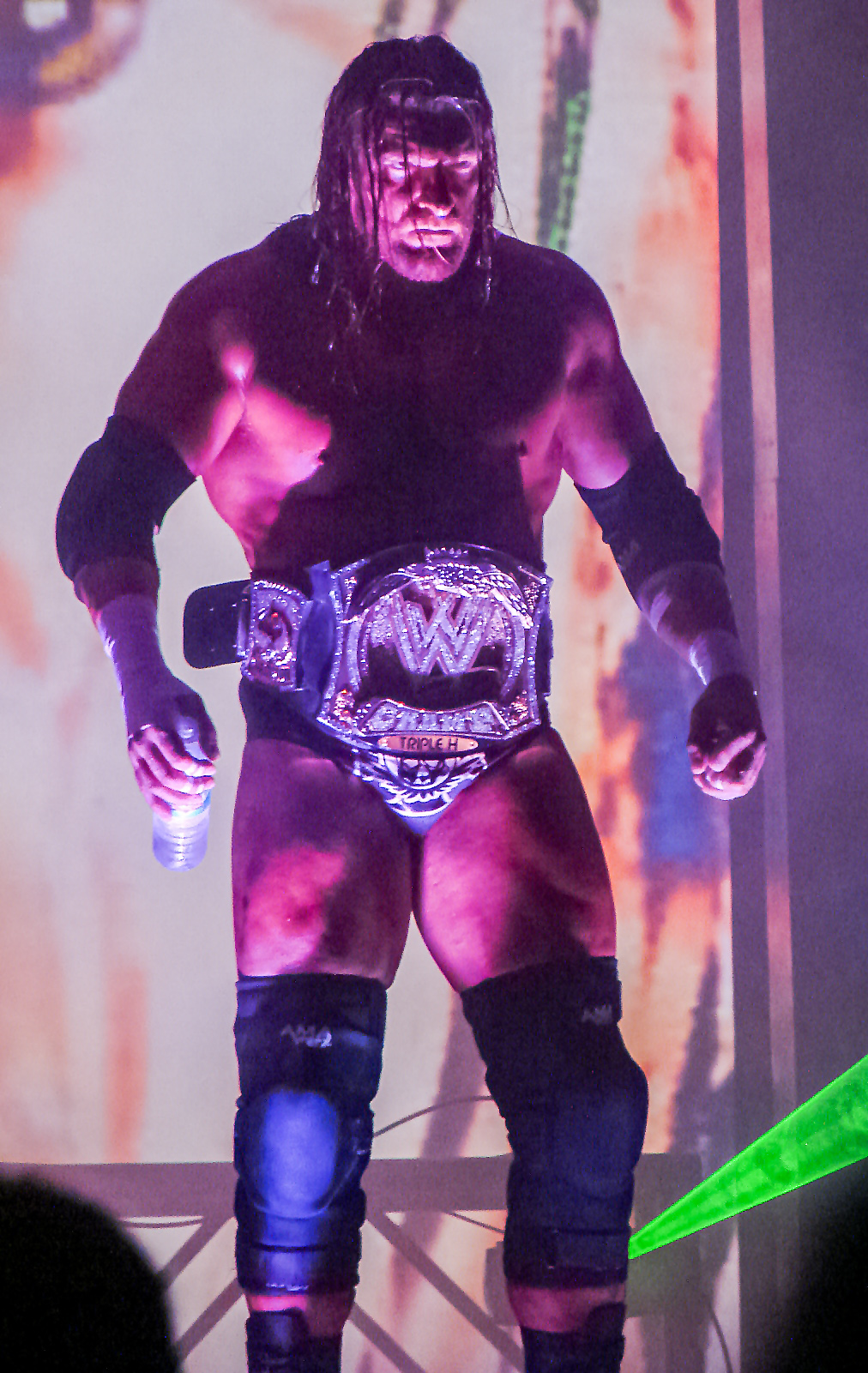
Triple H making his entrance with the WWE Championship, which he has won nine times

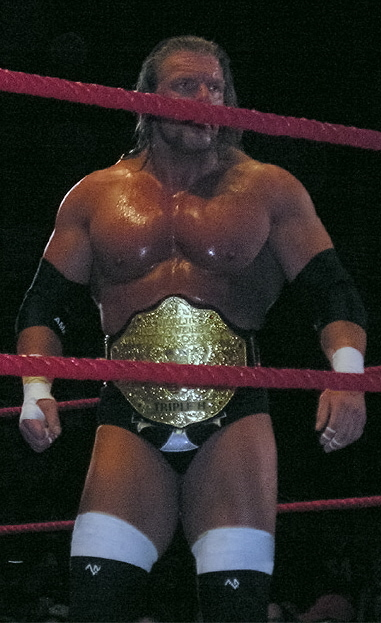
Triple H is also the inaugural and five-time World Heavyweight Champion, making him a 14-time world champion overall in WWE

- The Baltimore Sun
  - Wrestler of the Decade (2010)
- CBS Sports
  - Worst Angle of the Year (2018) with Shawn Michaels vs. The Undertaker and Kane
- International Wrestling Federation
  - IWF Heavyweight Championship (1 time)
  - IWF Tag Team Championship (1 time) - with Perry Saturn
- Pro Wrestling Illustrated
  - Feud of the Year (2000) vs. Kurt Angle
  - Feud of the Year (2004) vs. Chris Benoit
  - Feud of the Year (2009) vs. Randy Orton
  - Feud of the Year (2013) vs. Daniel Bryan – as a member of The Authority
  - Match of the Year (2004) vs. Chris Benoit and Shawn Michaels at WrestleMania XX
  - Match of the Year (2012) vs. The Undertaker in a Hell in a Cell match at WrestleMania XXVIII
  - Most Hated Wrestler of the Decade (2000–2009)
  - Most Hated Wrestler of the Year (2003–2005)
  - Most Hated Wrestler of the Year (2013) – as a member of The Authority
  - Most Hated Wrestler of the Year (2014) – with Stephanie McMahon
  - Wrestler of the Decade (2000–2009)
  - Wrestler of the Year (2008)
  - Ranked No. 1 of the top 500 singles wrestlers in the PWI 500 in 2000 and 2009
  - Ranked No. 139 of the top 500 singles wrestlers of the PWI Years in 2003
- Sports Illustrated
  - Ranked No. 7 of the 20 Greatest WWE Wrestlers Of All Time
- World Wrestling Federation/Entertainment/WWE
  - WWF/WWE Championship (Note: Triple H's fifth reign was as Undisputed WWF Champion. His next three were as simply WWE Champion, while his ninth reign was as WWE World Heavyweight Champion.) (9 times)
  - World Heavyweight Championship (5 times, inaugural)
  - WWF/WWE Intercontinental Championship (5 times)
  - WWF European Championship (2 times)
  - WWE Tag Team Championship (Note: Shawn Michaels and Triple H held the World Tag Team Championship and the WWE Tag Team Championship in tandem, known as the Unified WWE Tag Team Championship.) (1 time) – with Shawn Michaels
  - WWF/World Tag Team Championship (2 times) – with Stone Cold Steve Austin (1) and Shawn Michaels (1)
  - King of the Ring (1997)
  - Royal Rumble (2002, 2016)
  - Road to WrestleMania Tournament (2006)
  - Seventh Triple Crown Champion
  - Second Grand Slam Champion
  - Slammy Award (3 times)
    - Best Hair (1997)
    - OMG Moment of the Year (2011) – The Undertaker kicks out of a Tombstone Piledriver against Triple H at WrestleMania XXVII
    - Match of the Year (2012) – vs. The Undertaker in a Hell in a Cell match at WrestleMania XXVIII
  - WWE Hall of Fame (2 times)
    - Class of 2019 – as a member of D-Generation X
    - Class of 2025 – individually
  - WWE Bronze Statue (2025)
- Wrestling Observer Newsletter
  - Best Booker (2015) with Ryan Ward
  - Best Booker (2023, 2024)
  - Feud of the Year (2000) vs. Mick Foley
  - Feud of the Year (2004) vs. Chris Benoit and Shawn Michaels
  - Feud of the Year (2005) vs. Batista
  - Wrestler of the Year (2000)
  - Most Disgusting Promotional Tactic (2002) Accusing Kane of murder and necrophilia (Katie Vick)
  - Most Overrated (2002–2004, 2009)
  - Readers' Least Favorite Wrestler (2002, 2003)
  - Worst Feud of the Year (2002) vs. Kane
  - Worst Feud of the Year (2006) with Shawn Michaels vs. Vince McMahon and Shane McMahon
  - Worst Feud of the Year (2011) vs. Kevin Nash
  - Worst Feud of the Year (2013) – as member of The Authority vs. Big Show
  - Worst Worked Match of the Year (2003) vs. Scott Steiner at Royal Rumble
  - Worst Worked Match of the Year (2008) vs. Edge and Vladimir Kozlov at Survivor Series
  - Worst Match of the Year (2018) with Shawn Michaels vs The Undertaker and Kane at Crown Jewel
  - Wrestling Observer Newsletter Hall of Fame (Class of 2005)

=== Luchas de Apuestas record ===
Winner (wager)	Loser (wager)	Location	Event	Date	Notes
Triple H (championship)	Kane (mask)	New York, New York	Raw	June 23, 2003	

== Other awards and honors ==
- Boys & Girls Clubs of America
  - Hall of Fame (2017)
- International Sports Hall of Fame
  - Class of 2015
- Loudwire
  - Metal Ambassador of the Decade (2010s)
- Revolver Golden Gods Awards
  - Most Metal Athlete (2013)
- Metal Hammer magazine
  - Metal Hammer's Spirit of Lemmy Award (2016)

== Sources ==
- Levesque, Paul; Caprio, Robert (2010). Making the Game: Triple H's Approach to a Better Body. WWE Books. ISBN 9780743483612.
- Foley, Mick (2000). Have a Nice Day: A Tale of Blood and Sweatsocks. HarperCollins. ISBN 0-06-103101-1.
- PWI Staff (2007). "Pro Wrestling Illustrated presents: 2007 Wrestling almanac & book of facts". Wrestling's historical cards. Kappa Publishing.
- Baer, Randy & R. D. Reynolds (2003). Wrestlecrap: The Very Worst of Pro Wrestling. ECW Press. ISBN 1-55022-584-7.
- Laurer, Joanie (2001). If They Only Knew. ReaganBooks. ISBN 0-06-109895-7.
