= WWE Road to WrestleMania X8 =

2002 video game

- North American cover art featuring Triple H, Rob Van Dam and The Undertaker
- Developer: Natsume Co., Ltd.
- Publisher: THQ
- Platform: Game Boy Advance
- Release: NA: October 22, 2002; EU: October 25, 2002
- Genres: Sports
- Modes: Single-player, multiplayer

WWE Road to WrestleMania X8 is a professional wrestling video game released on the Game Boy Advance handheld console by THQ in 2002, based on WWE's 2002 pay-per-view WrestleMania X8. The game featured improved gameplay and grappling techniques compared to its predecessor. This game was the Game Boy Advance successor to WWF Road to WrestleMania from 2001 and was succeeded by WWE Survivor Series in 2004. It was one of two games named after the event, the other being WWE WrestleMania X8 for the GameCube, released five months prior in June 2002. Of the three WWE games developed by Natsume Co., Ltd. for the Game Boy Advance, WWE Road to WrestleMania X8 was the most successful in regard to both sales and reviews.

== Gameplay ==
With the limited number of buttons on the Game Boy Advance, just "A" and "B", WWE Road to WrestleMania X8 employed a simple approach to simulating wrestling moves. It has been likened to how Fire Pro Wrestling based the actions on timed button pressing and strategy. The combination of a button push and a direction choice when the two wrestlers lock up would result in different wrestling moves and also allowed for moves to be reversed if the timing was right. In addition, characters could climb ropes, perform running moves and pick up weapons. The gameplay was seen as an improvement over the "button mashing" approach of its predecessor WWF Road to WrestleMania.

Reviewers did point out that the game lacked a "Create-a-Wrestler" feature, most likely due to the limited memory of the Game Boy Advance. While the gameplay itself was improved, several reviewers noted that the Artificial Intelligence that controlled the computer opponents was easy and predictable. The AI also had problems during multi-man matches, on occasion attacking their own partner during a game.

== Match types ==
WWE Road to WresteMania X8 features four different game modes, Exhibition, Championship Mode, pay-per-view mode and Gauntlet mode. The Championship allowed a player to play through a WWE "Season" from the day after WrestleMania X-Seven until WrestleMania X8 to challenge for various WWE championships. The pay-per-view mode allowed the player to create a number of matches for a specific WWE PPV to play through. In the Gauntlet mode the player must survive against a set number of opponents, one match at a time. The game allows players to choose standard match options like one versus one, tag team matches as well as options such as lumberjack matches, with other wrestlers around the ring, Hardcore matches where weapons are allowed and even play a fifteen-man version of the Royal Rumble match as well as playing an eight-man King of the Ring tournament. Multiple players could play together, as many a four players if they all have the game cartridge and connect by using the GameLink cable.

The roster for the game included only 15 wrestlers (a reduced number from the previous game's 24): Kurt Angle, Booker T, Edge, Christian, Bubba Ray Dudley, D-Von Dudley, Hulk Hogan, Chris Jericho, Kane, Kevin Nash. Rob Van Dam, The Rock, Triple H, Test and the Undertaker. Of the 15 wrestlers selected for the game only Kevin Nash had not actually wrestled at WrestleMania X8, but did appear on the show as he accompanied Scott Hall (who was released from the company during the game's development) for his match against Stone Cold Steve Austin (who also did not appear in the game, likely due to creative issues that year). Test was not part of the pay-per-view broadcast but did wrestle on the pre-show.

== Visual and audio ==
The gameplay takes place in a "side-to-side" view of the ring from a single, fixed point of view providing a view of the wrestlers themselves and the audience in the background. The digitized sprite characters were described to look like as their onscreen counterparts and that they also move rather "smoothly" as well, thanks to an overall increase in animation.

From an audio standpoint the game featured versions of each wrestler's entrance music and the occasional catch phrase, but no ring commentary during the match. The sound was described as "high-quality as well, with punches, kicks, and slams having a crisp meaty sound" that captures the high-impact world of the WWE.

== Reception ==
Reception

Aggregate score
Aggregator	Score
Metacritic	73/100

Review scores
Publication	Score
Computer and Video Games	8/10
Game Informer	7/10
GameSpot	8.1/10
GameSpy	4/5
GameZone	8/10
IGN	7/10
Nintendo Power	3.2/5

The game received "mixed or average" reviews according to video game review aggregator website Metacritic, based on a total of ten reviews, four of which were positive and six were mixed. Metacritic's user score was slightly better, listed as "generally favorable" with a score of 7.5. GameZone said that the game does a solid job of emulating WWE wrestling while challenging and entertaining the players and rated it as "great".

== See also ==
- List of licensed wrestling video games
- List of fighting games
