= WWE Survivor Series (video game) =

2004 video game

- North American cover art featuring Randy Orton, Eddie Guerrero vs. Rey Mysterio, Shawn Michaels vs. Chris Jericho, Chris Benoit vs. Michaels, Mysterio, John Cena and The Undertaker
- Developer: Natsume Co., Ltd.
- Publisher: THQ
- Platform: Game Boy Advance
- Release: NA: October 21, 2004; EU: November 19, 2004
- Genre: Professional wrestling
- Modes: Single player, multiplayer

WWE Survivor Series is a professional wrestling video game developed by Natsume Co., Ltd. and published by THQ for the Game Boy Advance handheld console. WWE Survivor Series is based on the World Wrestling Entertainment (WWE) annual pay-per-view, Survivor Series. The game is the sequel to Road to WrestleMania X8. WWE Survivor Series was released in North America on October 21, 2004 and in Europe on November 19, 2004, and was also the last WWE video game released for a Nintendo handheld console until WWE SmackDown vs. Raw 2008 for the Nintendo DS in 2007.

With it being two years since the last Game Boy Advance WWE game, the roster is vastly different from previous one and included eight Raw and eight SmackDown! wrestlers. The story mode was changed to accompany the WWE's Brand Extension from 2002, meaning the player could choose a particular brand to get to the top before switching brands to conquer another brand. The story mode was also changed in that winning matches wasn't necessarily the main aim. Instead, the aim was to give out a good match and make matches less one-sided.

== Reception ==
Reception

Aggregate score
Aggregator	Score
Metacritic	55/100

Review scores
Publication	Score
Game Informer	7.5/10
GameSpot	5.6/10
GameZone	4.5/10
IGN	6/10
NGC Magazine	2/5
Nintendo Power	2.1/5

WWE Survivor Series received "mixed" reviews according to video game review aggregator website Metacritic.

== See also ==
- List of licensed wrestling video games
- List of fighting games
