= WWF Road to WrestleMania =

2001 video game

- Cover art featuring Kane, Stone Cold Steve Austin and The Undertaker
- Developer: Natsume Co., Ltd.
- Publisher: THQ
- Director: Shinji Kyogoku
- Producers: Sanders Keel; Iku Mizutani
- Programmers: Daisuke Tanabe; Naoki Tomosada
- Artists: Shuuya Takaoka; Shinji Kyogoku
- Composers: Iku Mizutani; Tetsuari Watanabe
- Platform: Game Boy Advance
- Release: EU: November 16, 2001; NA: November 19, 2001
- Genre: Wrestling
- Modes: Single-player, multiplayer

WWF Road to WrestleMania is a video game released on the Game Boy Advance handheld console by THQ, based on the World Wrestling Federation's pay-per-view of the same name. The game was released in Europe on November 16, 2001, and North America on November 19, 2001. It was the first WWF game to be released on the Game Boy Advance, and the only one released under the WWF name, as the promotion was renamed to WWE in 2002. The main part of the game is the season mode where players have to win matches to get a heavyweight championship title match.

The game was succeeded by WWE Road to WrestleMania X8.

== Gameplay ==
The game features both single-player and multiplayer game modes, with multiplayer being available through the Game Boy Advance Gamelink cable. The single-player game modes have a variety of match types including Exhibition, Gauntlet, Season, King of the Ring, Royal Rumble, Iron Man, and Pay Per View. Due to memory and roster limit restrictions, the Royal Rumble game mode is limited only to a maximum of 24 participants, compared to the average of 30 in its real-life variant. The season mode is incredibly similar to career modes found in other sports and wrestling games alike, which involves the player choosing a wrestler and building their career with the end goal of reaching WrestleMania, WWE's premier event of the year. Every week the player is subjected to various matches against the other competing wrestlers on the roster.

== Reception ==
Reception

Aggregate score
Aggregator	Score
Metacritic	62/100

Review scores
Publication	Score
Computer and Video Games	6/10
GameSpot	7.8/10
GameZone	8/10
IGN	3/10
Nintendo Power	3.2/5

The game received "mixed" reviews according to video game review aggregator website Metacritic, earning an average score of 62 out of 100, based on 7 critics reviews.

Computer and Video Games's staff gave the game a 6/10, criticizing the 2D graphics and the awkward controls, but praised the "cheesy intros" and content, declaring it better than Fire Pro Wrestling, but inferior to the SmackDown games. Nintendo Power's reviews gave it a collective score of 3.2/5.

Conversely, IGN's Nix reviewed the game extremely negatively, referring to it as a "rehash of the GBC game...that got canned for not measuring up last year", and noted the graphics as being "the bare minimum of what the GBA can do...three animations of the Rock Bottom don't cut it", ultimately giving the game a 3/10 score.

== See also ==
- List of licensed wrestling video games
- List of fighting games
